= List of vegans =

Veganism is the abstention from animal products. It can extend to ethical veganism, which avoids or boycotts all products and activities whose production or undertaking is perceived to exploit animals. Examples include abandoning leather, silk, fur, wool, and cosmetics that have been tested on animals, alongside blood sports such as bullfighting, hunting, and fishing. Additionally, environmental veganism involves avoiding animal products due to industrial farming of animals being environmentally damaging and unsustainable.

All the people on this list are reportedly practising a vegan diet, or were at the time of their death.

== List ==
Name	Occupation	Birthplace	Source
Elisa Aaltola	Philosopher	Finland	
Chad Ackerman	Singer-songwriter	United States	
Bryan Adams	Singer-songwriter	Canada	
Carol J. Adams	Writer, animal rights advocate	United States	
Casey Affleck	Actor	United States	
Nasim Aghdam	Activist, mass shooter	Iran	
Akala	Rapper, poet and political activist	United Kingdom	
Al-Ma'arri	Philosopher	Syria	
Rubén Albarrán	Musician	Mexico	
Amos Bronson Alcott	Activist, writer	United States	
Sophie Aldred	Actress and television presenter	United Kingdom	
Allday	Rapper	Australia	
Pelle Almqvist	Musician	Sweden	
Suzy Amis	Actress	United States	
Ben Ammi Ben-Israel	Founder of the Black Hebrew Israelites	United States	
Simon Amstell	Comedian	United Kingdom	
Diana Anaid	Singer-songwriter	Australia	
Austin Aries	Professional wrestler	United States	
Darren Aronofsky	Film director	United States	
Allisyn Ashley Arm	Actress	United States	
Dan Askew	Record label owner	United States	
James Aspey	Fitness trainer	Australia	
Andreas Athanasiou	Ice hockey player	Canada	
Sid Ation	Musician, chef	United Kingdom	
Nava Atlas	Book artist	United States	
Eli Avidar	Politician	Israel	
Cam F. Awesome	Boxer	United States	
Axel	Singer-songwriter	Argentina	
Patrik Baboumian	Strength athlete, former bodybuilder	Iran	
Erykah Badu	Singer-songwriter	United States	
Tom Bailey	Musician	United Kingdom	
Maggie Baird	Actress	United States	
Jonathan Balcombe	Ethologist	United Kingdom	
Matt Ball	Company director	United States	
Kurt Ballou	Musician	United States	
Martin Balluch	Animal rights activist	Austria	
Sam Bankman-Fried	Former CEO of FTX	United States	
Cassandra Bankson	Model	United States	
Travis Barker	Musician	United States	
Neal D. Barnard	Physician	United States	
Thomas Barnett	Musician	United States	
Tyler Bate	Professional wrestler	United Kingdom	
Gene Baur	Activist	United States	
Violett Beane	Actress	United States	
Jona Bechtolt	Musician	United States	
Ed Begley Jr.	Actor	United States	
Conrad Beissel	Christian mystic	Germany	
Marc Bekoff	Ethologist	United States	
Brian Bell	Musician	United States	
Steve Bellamy	Entrepreneur, filmmaker	United States	
Héctor Bellerín	Footballer	Spain	
David Benatar	Philosopher	South Africa	
Mark Benecke	Forensic Biologist	Germany	
Mirco Bergamasco	Rugby player	Italy	
Rynn Berry	Historian	United States	
Steven Best	Philosopher	United States	
Ryan Bethencourt	Scientist, entrepreneur, biohacker	United States	
Mayim Bialik	Actress	United States	
Khaled bin Alwaleed bin Talal	Prince of Saudi Arabia, businessman	Saudi Arabia	
Richie Birkenhead	Musician	United States	
Bethany Black	Comedian	United Kingdom	
Shari Black Velvet	Editor, photographer	United Kingdom	
Linda Blair	Actress	United States	
Alana Blanchard	Professional surfer	United States	
Tia Blanco	Surfer	Puerto Rico	
Bobby Blood	Musician, drummer, filmmaker	United States	
Lisa Bloom	Lawyer	United States	
Bruno Blum	Musician, writer, artist	France	
Bimini Bon-Boulash	Drag queen	United Kingdom	
Will Bonsall	American author, seed saver, veganic farmer	United States	
Cory Booker	Politician	United States	
BOSH!	Food writers	United Kingdom	
Darren Boyd	Actor	United Kingdom	
Mark Mathew Braunstein	Writer	United States	
Brendan Brazier	Athlete	Canada	
Sean Brennan	Musician	United States	
Beau Bridges	Actor	United States	
Dan Briggs	Musician	United States	
Shaun Brisley	Footballer	United Kingdom	
John de Britto	Missionary, martyr, saint	Portugal	
Patrick O. Brown	Biochemist	United States	
Mark Browning	Singer-songwriter	Canada	
Karl Buechner	Musician, singer	United States	
Enrique Bunbury	Musician	Spain	
Avraham Burg	Politician	Israel	
Hunter Burgan	Musician	United States	
Rosie Burgess	Musician	Australia	
Georges Butaud	Individualist anarchist	France	
Geezer Butler	Musician	United Kingdom	
Karyn Calabrese	Chef	United States	
James Cameron	Film director	Canada	
Molly Cameron	Cyclist	United States	
Frieda Rapoport Caplan	Specialty produce entrepreneur	United States	
Capleton	Musician	Jamaica	
Joey Carbstrong	Animal rights activist	Australia	
Kris Carr	Author, wellness activist	United States	
Kristina Carrillo-Bucaram	Writer, activist	United States	
David Carter	American football player	United States	
Daniel P. Carter	Musician, radio DJ	United Kingdom	
Jordi Casamitjana	Animal advocate	United Kingdom	
Richa Chadda	Bollywood actress	India	
Jessica Chastain	Actress	United States	
Cesar Chavez	Farm workers union leader	United States	
Chikezie	Singer	United States	
Chokeules	Rapper	Canada	
George Church	Scientist	United States	
Greg Cipes	Actor	United States	
Geoffrey Claussen	Rabbi	United States	
Scott Cohen	Entrepreneur, manager	United Kingdom	
Kneel Cohn	Musician	United States	
Phil Collen	Musician	United Kingdom	
Pat Condell	Internet personality, former stand-up comedian	Ireland	
Elena Congost	Athlete	Spain	
Annette Conlon	Musician	United States	
Yeng Constantino	Singer-songwriter	Philippines	
Sam Cooke	Model	United Kingdom	
T Cooper	Novelist	United States	
Darren Cordeux	Musician	Australia	
Sam Corlett	Actor	Australia	
Chloe Coscarelli	Chef	United States	
Roger Crab	Ascetic	Kingdom of England	
Sarah-Jane Crawford	Presenter, actress	United Kingdom	
Juli Crockett	Playwright	United States	
James Cromwell	Actor	United States	
Geneva Cruz	Singer, actress	Philippines	
Carlos Cuéllar	Footballer	Spain	
Caro Cult	Actress	Germany	
Alan Cumming	Actor	United Kingdom	
Luke Cummo	MMA fighter	United States	
Cade Cunningham	Basketball player	United States	
Adi Da	Spiritual teacher	United States	
Aaron Dalbec	Musician	United States	
Mac Danzig	MMA fighter	United States	
Angela Davis	Civil rights activist	United States	
Karen Davis	Businesswoman	United States	
Steph Davis	Rock climber	United States	
Camille DeAngelis	Author	United States	
Jan Deckers	Philosopher	United Kingdom	
Thomas Dekker	Actor	United States	
Élise Desaulniers	Journalist	Canada	
Emily Deschanel	Actress	United States	
David Desrosiers	Musician	Canada	
Ted Deutch	Politician	United States	
Kadie Diekmeyer	Animal rights activist, schoolteacher, YouTuber	Canada	
H. Jay Dinshah	Activist	United States	
DJ Qbert	Turntablist	United States	
Anita Dongre	Fashion designer	India	
Alan Donohoe	Musician	United Kingdom	
Josephine Donovan	Professor of English	Philippines	
Michael C. Dorf	Lawyer	United States	
Michael Dorn	Actor	United States	
Dotter	Singer-songwriter	Sweden	
Christofer Drew	Musician	United States	
Janez Drnovšek	Politician	Slovenia	
Meagan Duhamel	Pair skater	Canada	
Amy Dumas	Professional wrestler	United States	
Joan Dunayer	Writer, animal rights advocate	United States	
Pete Dunne	Professional wrestler	United Kingdom	
Joe Duplantier	Musician, producer, animal rights advocate	France	
Jermaine Dupri	Rapper, producer	United States	
Sadie Dupuis	Musician, poet	United States	
Fred Durst	Musician, film director	United States	
Peter Ebdon	Snooker player	United Kingdom	
Peter Egan	Actor	United Kingdom	
Arnold Ehret	Health educator	Germany	
Billie Eilish	Singer-songwriter	United States	
Heather Rae El Moussa	Realtor	United States	
Electroboy	Model	Switzerland	
Kimberly Elise	Actress	United States	
Nathalie Emmanuel	Actress	United Kingdom	
Bryan Erickson	Musician	United States	
Nathaniel Erskine-Smith	Politician, member of Parliament	Canada	
Caldwell Esselstyn	Physician, former rower	United States	
Rip Esselstyn	Health activist and food writer, former firefighter and triathlete	United States	
Jade Esteban Estrada	Humorist	United States	
William Faith	Musician	United States	
Edie Falco	Actress	United States	
Anthony Fantano	Music reviewer	United States	
Kendrick Farris	Weightlifter	United States	
John Feldmann	Musician	United States	
Pamelyn Ferdin	Actress	United States	
Craig Ferguson	Television host	United Kingdom	
Adam Fisher	Musician	United States	
Tony Fletcher	Music journalist	United Kingdom	
Jerome Flynn	Actor	United Kingdom	
Jared Followill	Musician	United States	
Michelle Forbes	Actress	United States	
Tom Ford	Fashion designer, film director	United States	
William Clay Ford Jr.	Businessman	United States	
Erik Foss	Artist and curator	United States	
Gary L. Francione	Lawyer	United States	
Michael Franti	Musician, rapper, poet	United States	
Kathy Freston	Author	United States	
Gal Fridman	Windsurfing Olympic champion	Israel	
Glen E. Friedman	Photographer	United States	
Bruce Friedrich	Nonprofit executive	United States	
Greta Gaard	Professor of English	United States	
Tulsi Gabbard	Politician	United States	
Jackson Galaxy	Cat behaviourist, television personality	United States	
Aidan Gallagher	Actor	United States	
Maneka Gandhi	Politician	India	
Sharon Gannon	Yoga teacher, animal rights advocate	United States	
Anu Garg	Author	India	
Robert Garner	Political theorist	United Kingdom	
Meredith Garretson	Actress	United States	
Josh Garrett	Hiker	United States	
Alexis Gauthier	Chef	France	
Juliet Gellatley	Writer, animal rights activist	United Kingdom	
Juan Genovés	Painter	Spain	
Christen Gerhart	Magician, web host	United States	
Ricky Gervais	Comedian, actor, director, writer	United Kingdom	
Sara Gilbert	Actress	United States	
Tal Gilboa	Animal rights activist	Israel	
Jason Gillespie	Cricketer and coach	Australia	
Lauriane Gilliéron	Model, actress	Switzerland	
Greg Ginn	Musician	United States	
Lewis Gompertz	Animal rights advocate	United Kingdom	
Jane Goodall	Primatologist and anthropologist	United Kingdom	
Berry Gordy	Record producer	United States	
Al Gore	Politician and environmentalist	United States	
Volkert van der Graaf	Convicted murderer	Netherlands	
Laura Jane Grace	Musician	United States	
Derrick Green	Extreme metal vocalist for Sepultura	United States	
Brian Greene	Physicist	United States	
Barney Greenway	Vocalist	United Kingdom	
Michael Greger	Physician	United States	
Aaron Gross	Historian	United States	
Lori Gruen	Philosopher	United States	
Osher Günsberg	Radio and television presenter	Australia	
Lawrence Guy	Football lineman	United States	
Larry Hagman	Actor, director, producer	United States	
Miki Haimovich	Politician	Israel	
John S. Hall	Poet	United States	
Lewis Hamilton	Formula 1 driver	United Kingdom	
Thích Nhất Hạnh	Zen Buddhist monk	Vietnam	
Daryl Hannah	Actress	United States	
Andreas Hänni	Ice hockey player	Switzerland	
Adam Hansen	Cyclist	Australia	
Marieke Hardy	Screenwriter	Australia	
Yuval Noah Harari	Historian	Israel	
Jasmine Harman	Television presenter	United Kingdom	
Stevan Harnad	Cognitive scientist	Hungary	
A. Breeze Harper	Critical race theorist and activist	United States	
Woody Harrelson	Actor	United States	
Ellie Harrison	Artist	United Kingdom	
Robert A de J Hart	Horticulturist	United Kingdom	
Davey Havok	Musician	United States	
Mark Hawthorne	Writer, animal rights advocate	United States	
David Haye	Boxer	United Kingdom	
Chris Hedges	Journalist	United States	
Jerry Heil	Singer-songwriter	Ukraine	
Henry Herbert, 9th Earl of Pembroke	Peer and courtier	United Kingdom	
Alex Hershaft	Animal rights activist	Poland	
Paul Higgins	Actor	United Kingdom	
Felix Hnat	Animal rights activist	Austria	
Douglas Hofstadter	Cognitive scientist	United States	
Kim Hollingsworth	Equestrian, former prostitute	Australia	
Elizabeth Holmes	CEO and founder, Theranos	United States	
Gary Holt	Musician	United States	
Zoë Pastelle Holthuizen	Actress	Switzerland	
Mark Hoppus	Musician	United States	
Dean Howell	Footballer	United Kingdom	
Makini Howell	Chef and restaurateur	United States	
Nell Hudson	Actress, author and musician	United Kingdom	
Andy Hurley	Musician, drummer	United States	
Emma Hurst	Politician, psychologist, bodybuilder	Australia	
Ildjarn	Musician	Norway	
Im Soo-jung	Actress	South Korea	
Don Imus	Radio host	United States	
Kyrie Irving	Basketball player	United States	
Harish Iyer	Activist	India	
George Jacobs	Educator	United States	
Elgin James	Filmmaker, musician	United States	
Pandie James	Writer, actress, film producer	New Zealand	
Cathy Jamieson	Politician	United Kingdom	
Vidyut Jammwal	Actor, martial artist	India	
Famke Janssen	Actress	Netherlands	
Bryant Jennings	Boxer	United States	
Penn Jillette	Magician, television personality	United States	
Jme	MC	United Kingdom	
Inge Johansson	Musician	Sweden	
John 5	Musician	United States	
Eric Johnson	American football player	United States	
Jackie Johnson	Comedian	United States	
Kuntal Joisher	Mountaineer	India	
Pattrice Jones	Ecofeminist writer, educator and activist	United States	
Maurice Jones-Drew	American football player	United States	
John Joseph	Singer	United States	
Elijah Joy	Chef	United States	
Melanie Joy	Social psychologist	United States	
Scott Jurek	Runner	United States	
Jyrki 69	Musician	Finland	
Timur Kacharava	Activist, musician	Soviet Union	
Colin Kaepernick	American football player	United States	
Gerlinde Kaltenbrunner	Mountaineer	Austria	
Avery Yale Kamila	American journalist, vegan columnist, community organizer	United States	
Tony Kanal	Musician	United States	
Myq Kaplan	Actor	United States	
Gilad Kariv	Politician	Israel	
Casey Kasem	DJ, music historian, radio personality, voice actor	United States	
Tonya Kay	Dancer, actress	United States	
Matt Kean	Musician	United Kingdom	
Asa Keisar	Jewish scholar	Israel	
Shannon Keith	Lawyer	United States	
Wade Keller	Sports writer	United States	
Lisa Kemmerer	Philosopher	United States	
Ibram X. Kendi	Author, activist	United States	
Chaka Khan	Musician	United States	
Aamir Khan	Actor	India	
Marti Kheel	Academic	United States	
Allison Kilkenny	Journalist	United States	
Jamie Kilstein	Comedian	United States	
Coretta Scott King	Author	United States	
Dexter King	Activist	United States	
John King	Author	United Kingdom	
Shaun King	Writer, civil rights activist	United States	
John Kinsella	Poet	Australia	
Daniel Kish	Educator	United States	
Michael Klaper	Physician	United States	
Aph Ko	Activist, writer, digital media producer	United States	
Aviv Kochavi	Soldier	Israel	
Kathy Kolla	Film director	United States	
Misato Komatsubara	Ice dancer	Japan	
Bryan Konietzko	Animation director	United States	
Kristin Kontrol	Musician	United States	
Christine Korsgaard	Philosopher	United States	
Sarah Kramer	Food writer	Canada	
Lenny Kravitz	Musician	United States	
Kripparrian	Streamer	Canada	
Dennis Kucinich	Politician	United States	
Elizabeth Kucinich	Company director	United States	
Will Kymlicka	Philosopher	Canada	
Mon Laferte	Singer-songwriter	Chile	
Andy Lally	Race car driver	United States	
Gulu Lalvani	Entrepreneur	India	
William Lambe	Physician	United Kingdom	
Charles Lane	Transcendentalist	United Kingdom	
Czesław Lang	Road racing cyclist	Poland	
Ladule Lako LoSarah	Footballer	United States	
k.d. lang	Singer-songwriter	Canada	
Gill Langley	Scientist	United Kingdom	
Adam Lanza	None known, mass murderer	United States	
Georges Laraque	Ice hockey player	Canada	
Preacher Lawson	Comedian	United States	
Sandra Lawson	Rabbi	United States	
Mandy Lee	Musician	United States	
Ronnie Lee	Animal rights activist	United Kingdom	
Carol Leifer	Comedian	United States	
Amelie Lens	DJ	Belgium	
Ted Leo	Singer-songwriter	United States	
Curtis Lepore	Actor, musician	United States	
Isa Leshko	Photographer	United States	
Jason P. Lester	Athlete	United States	
Carl Lewis	Athlete	United States	
Naomi Lewis	Writer	United Kingdom	
Jessie Mei Li	Actress	United Kingdom	
Chris Liebing	DJ, music producer, radio host	Germany	
David Life	Yoga teacher	United States	
Bob Linden	Radio producer	United States	
Cody Linley	Actor	United States	
Andrew Linzey	Theologian	United Kingdom	
Eric Litman	Entrepreneur	United States	
Gregg Lowe	Actor	United Kingdom	
Howard Lyman	Farmer	United States	
Evanna Lynch	Actress	Ireland	
Dennis Lyxzén	Musician	Sweden	
Peter Machajdík	Composer	Slovakia	
Lee Mack	Comedian	United Kingdom	
Macka B	Musician	United Kingdom	
Ian MacKaye	Singer-songwriter	United States	
Oceana Mackenzie	Rock climber	Germany	
Stu Mackenzie	Musician, singer-songwriter	Australia	
John Mackey	Businessman	United States	
Rachel MacNair	Sociologist	United States	
Mickey Madden	Musician	United States	
Mikey Madison	Actress	United States	
Tobey Maguire	Actor	United States	
Mallrat	Musician	Australia	
Jeff Mangum	Musician	United States	
Damien Mander	Conservationist	Australia	
Reed Mangels	Dietitian	United States	
Jesse Zook Mann	Film producer, director	United States	
Keith Mann	Animal rights activist	United Kingdom	
Kate Mara	Actress	United States	
Rooney Mara	Actress	United States	
Jenna Marbles	Comedian	United States	
Jeff Marek	Sports commentator	Canada	
Adrian Mariappa	Footballer	Jamaica	
Brit Marling	Actress, screenwriter	United States	
Ramona Marquez	Actress	United Kingdom	
Johnny Marr	Musician	United Kingdom	
Liz Marshall	Filmmaker	Canada	
Russell Martin	Footballer	United Kingdom	
Richard Marx	Singer-songwriter	United States	
Jeanne Mas	Singer, actress	France	
Fred Mascherino	Musician	United States	
Jeffrey Moussaieff Masson	Writer	United States	
Mathematics	Hip hop producer, DJ	United States	
Dan Mathews	Businessman	United States	
Matisyahu	Singer-songwriter	United States	
Peter Max	Artist	United States	
Brian May	Musician, astrophysicist, author	United Kingdom	
Chris Mayne	Australian rules footballer	Australia	
Jo-Anne McArthur	Photographer	Canada	
Jenny McCarthy	Model	United States	
Kerry McCarthy	Politician	United Kingdom	
Dave McClain	Musician, drummer	United States	
Lauren McCrostie	Actress	United Kingdom	
John A. McDougall	Physician and author	United States	
Lindsay McDougall	Musician, radio presenter	Australia	
JaVale McGee	Basketball player	United States	
Jane McGonigal	Game designer	United States	
Nellie McKay	Singer-songwriter	United States	
Tracye McQuirter	Cookbook author and vegan activist	United States	
Taj McWilliams-Franklin	Basketball player	United States	
Alex Megos	Rock climber	Germany	
Erica Meier	Animal rights activist	United States	
Luísa Mell	Actress	Brazil	
Merzbow	Musician	Japan	
Izabella Miko	Actress	Poland	
Tomo Miličević	Musician	United States	
Ed Miller	Author	United States	
Heather Mills	Businesswoman	United Kingdom	
Zillah Minx	Musician, film director	United Kingdom	
Morgan Mitchell	Runner	Australia	
Moby	Musician	United States	
Siue Moffat	Chocolatier, film archivist	Canada	
Daniella Monet	Actress	United States	
Ray Monk	Biographer, philosopher	United Kingdom	
Jack Monroe	Food writer, activist	United Kingdom	
Shaun Monson	Film director	United States	
Demi Moore	Actress	United States	
Victoria Moran	Writer, animal rights advocate	United States	
Gaby Moreno	Singer-songwriter	Guatemala	
Alex Morgan	Footballer	United States	
Derrick Morgan	American football player	United States	
Diane Morgan	Actress, comedian, writer	United Kingdom	
Joseph Morgan	Actor	United Kingdom	
Jim Morris	Bodybuilder	United States	
Morrissey	Singer-songwriter	United Kingdom	
Toby Morse	Musician	United States	
Isa Chandra Moskowitz	Chef	United States	
Carrie-Anne Moss	Actress	Canada	
Markos Moulitsas	Political blogger	United States	
Anthony Mullally	Rugby player	United Kingdom	
Will Munro	Artist	Australia	
Leilani Munter	Race car driver	United States	
Simone Murphy	Model	United Kingdom	
Mutabaruka	Poet	Jamaica	
Mýa	Singer, actress	United States	
Bif Naked	Musician	Canada	
Kate Nash	Musician and actor	United Kingdom	
Daniel Negreanu	Professional poker player	Canada	
Petra Němcová	Supermodel	Czech Republic	
Ingrid Newkirk	Animal rights activist	United Kingdom	
G. F. Newman	Writer, television producer	United Kingdom	
Cam Newton	Former american football quarterback	United States	
Pat Neshek	Baseball player	United States	
Nessa	Radio and TV personality	United States	
David Nibert	Sociologist	United States	
Heather Nicholson	Animal rights activist	United Kingdom	
Jayde Nicole	Model	Canada	
Fumi Nikaido	Actress	Japan	
Nominjin	Singer-songwriter	Mongolia	
Nothing,Nowhere	Musician	United States	
N.O.R.E.	Rapper	United States	
Jack Norris	President of Vegan Outreach	United States	
Tig Notaro	Stand-up comedian, writer, actress	United States	
Terri Nunn	Singer, actress	United States	
Finneas O'Connell	Musician	United States	
Fiona Oakes	Marathon runner, animal rights advocate	United Kingdom	
Peggy Oki	Skateboarder, animal rights activist	United States	
Ellen Oléria	Singer-songwriter, actress	Brazil	
Renee Olstead	Singer, actress	United States	
Andrew O'Neill	Comedian	United Kingdom	
Lauren Ornelas	Animal rights activist, founder of Food Empowerment Project	United States	
Lisette Oropesa	Operatic soprano	United States	
Esther Ouwehand	Politician	Netherlands	
Ovidie	Porn director and actress, journalist, writer	France	
P Money	Rapper	United Kingdom	
Wayne Pacelle	Former President and CEO, Humane Society of the United States	United States	
Anthony Padilla	Internet personality, comedian, filmmaker, actor	United States	
Alex Pacheco	Co-founder of PETA	United States	
Chris Packham	Naturalist, TV presenter, author	United Kingdom	
Elliot Page	Actor	Canada	
Carl Palmer	Musician, drummer	United Kingdom	
Teresa Palmer	Actress, model	Australia	
Francis of Paola	Mendicant friar	Italy	
Alan Park	Comedian	Canada	
Sara Pascoe	Comedian	United Kingdom	
Robert Paterson	Composer	United States	
Marcus Patrick	Actor	United Kingdom	
Colleen Patrick-Goudreau	Author	United States	
Alexandra Paul	Actress	United States	
Steve Pavlina	Self-help author	United States	
David Pearce	Philosopher	United Kingdom	
Robin Pecknold	Singer-songwriter	United States	
Paul Peress	Musician, drummer, composer	United States	
Sebastián Pérez Cardona	Footballer	Colombia	
Linda Perry	Musician	United States	
Doro Pesch	Singer-songwriter	Germany	
JJ Peters	Musician	United States	
Mille Petrozza	Musician	Germany	
Madelaine Petsch	Actress	United States	
Norm Phelps	Writer, animal rights advocate	United States	
Jill Phipps	Animal rights activist	United Kingdom	
Joaquin Phoenix	Actor	United States	
Rain Phoenix	Actress	United States	
River Phoenix	Actor	United States	
Summer Phoenix	Actress	United States	
Jessica Pierce	Bioethicist and writer	United States	
Rachel Pilkington	Actress	Ireland	
Piggy D.	Musician	United States	
Pedro Piquero	Classical pianist and Buddhist Zen teacher	Spain	
Dav Pilkey	Author	United States	
Steve Pilot	Model, author, fitness trainer, vegan nutritionist	Germany	
Dan Piraro	Cartoonist	United States	
Jonathan Pollak	Activist, anarchist	Israel	
Zack Polanski	Politician	United Kingdom	
Eva Pope	Actress	United Kingdom	
Natalie Portman	Actress	Israel	
Franka Potente	Actress	Germany	
Chad Price	Singer	United States	
Princess Superstar	Musician	United States	
Joe Principe	Musician	United States	
Promoe	Rapper	Sweden	
Spencer Pumpelly	Race car driver	United States	
Pablo Puyol	Actor, dancer, singer	Spain	
Maggie Q	Actress, model	United States	
Linnea Quigley	Actress	United States	
Robin Quivers	Talk-show host	United States	
Gideon Raff	Film and television director	Israel	
Bella Ramsey	Actor	United Kingdom	
Kangana Ranaut	Actress	India	
Randy Randall	Musician	United States	
Romesh Ranganathan	Comedian	United Kingdom	
Russ Rankin	Musician	United States	
Kiran Rao	Film producer, screenwriter and director	India	
Raury	Musician	United States	
Jacy Reese Anthis	Writer, social scientist	United States	
Tom Regan	Philosopher	United States	
Marco Antonio Regil	Actor, television personality, game show host	Mexico	
Hubertus Regout	Actor	Belgium	
Rezo	YouTuber	Germany	
Matthieu Ricard	Buddhist monk	France	
Santino Rice	Fashion designer	United States	
Dawn Richard	Singer-songwriter, actress	United States	
Dakota Blue Richards	Actress	United Kingdom	
Monica Richards	Musician	United States	
Kane Richardson	Cricketer	Australia	
Calu Rivero	Actress, model, designer	Argentina	
John Robb	Musician	United Kingdom	
John Robbins	Author	United States	
Neil Robertson	Snooker player	Australia	
Neil Robinson	Footballer	United Kingdom	
Rikki Rockett	Musician, drummer	United States	
Tommy Giles Rogers Jr.	Musician	United States	
Yishai Romanoff	Musician	United States	
Ruby Rose	Model, actress	Australia	
David Rosen	Rabbi	Ireland	
Kirsten Rosenberg	Singer	United States	
Alex Ross Perry	Film director, actor	United States	
Share Ross	Musician	United States	
Portia de Rossi	Actress	Australia	
Bubby Rossman	Baseball player	United States	
Simchah Roth	Rabbi	Israel	
RZA	Rapper, actor, filmmaker and record producer	United States	
Zack Sabre Jr.	Professional wrestler	United Kingdom	
Sadha	Actress	India	
John Salley	Professional basketball player, talk show host	United States	
Daniel Andreas San Diego	Domestic terrorist, animal liberationist	United States	
Alejandro Sanz	Musician	Spain	
Peter Sarsgaard	Actor	United States	
Anuradha Sawhney	Animal rights activist, former head of PETA India	India	
Adam Schiff	Politician	United States	
Rebecca Schiffman	Singer-songwriter	United States	
Miyoko Schinner	Entrepreneur	United States	
John Schneider	Actor	United States	
Richard H. Schwartz	Mathematician	United States	
Mike Scott	Musician	United Kingdom	
Carl Scully	Former politician	Australia	
Matthew Scully	Journalist	United States	
Daniel Sea	Actor	United States	
Trent Seven	Professional wrestler	United Kingdom	
Alfredo Sfeir	Economist, spiritual leader	Chile	
Roxy Shahidi	Actress	United Kingdom	
Paul Shapiro	Businessman	United States	
Ryan Shapiro	FOIA researcher, animal rights activist	United States	
Ori Shavit	Animal-rights activist	Israel	
Cindy Sheehan	Anti-war activist	United States	
Mallika Sherawat	Actress	India	
Taran Noah Smith	Actor	United States	
Peter Siddle	Cricketer	Australia	
Sie7e	Singer-songwriter	Puerto Rico	
Alicia Silverstone	Actress	United States	
Billy Simmonds	Bodybuilder, entrepreneur	Australia	
Russell Simmons	Entrepreneur	United States	
Sam Simon	Television director	United States	
Sadie Sink	Actress	United States	
Atanas Skatov	Mountaineer	Bulgaria	
Heather Small	Singer-songwriter	United Kingdom	
Chris Smalling	Footballer	United Kingdom	
Kevin Smith	Filmmaker, comedian	United States	
Lucious Smith	Former NFL player, fitness trainer	United States	
Soko	Musician, actress	France	
Sóley	Musician	Iceland	
Alex Somers	Visual artist, musician	United States	
Graeme Souness	Footballer	United Kingdom	
Benjamin Spock	Pediatrician	United States	
Dean Allen Spunt	Musician	United States	
Sylwia Spurek	Politician	Poland	
Oliver Stark	Actor	United Kingdom	
Skylar Stecker	Singer-songwriter, actress	United States	
Joanne Stepaniak	Food writer	United States	
Sarah Stewart	Wheelchair basketball player	Australia	
stic.man	Rapper	United States	
Biz Stone	Entrepreneur	United States	
Gene Stone	Author	United States	
Lynda Stoner	Actress	Australia	
Salim Stoudamire	Basketball player	United States	
David Straitjacket	Escape artist	United Kingdom	
Belinda Stronach	Businesswoman	Canada	
Tara Strong	Voice actress	Canada	
George Stroumboulopoulos	Television and radio personality	Canada	
William John Sullivan	Software freedom activist	United States	
Peter Sunde	Businessman	Sweden	
Kurt Sutter	Filmmaker	United States	
Mena Suvari	Actress	United States	
Ember Swift	Singer-songwriter	Canada	
Oliver Sykes	Musician	United Kingdom	
David Sztybel	Ethicist	Canada	
Ayesha Takia	Actress	India	
Tommy Tallarico	Composer	United States	
Jacques Tardi	Cartoonist	France	
Vernon Tava	Politician	New Zealand	
Astra Taylor	Filmmaker, writer, musician	United States	
Sunaura Taylor	Painter, writer and activist	United States	
Ed Templeton	Skateboarder	United States	
Chloe Temtchine	Singer-songwriter	United States	
Bryant Terry	Chef	United States	
Thamarai	Poet, lyricist	India	
Marianne Thieme	Politician	Netherlands	
David Thrussell	Musician	Australia	
Greta Thunberg	Climate activist	Sweden	
Tigerlily	DJ	Australia	
Nadya Tolokonnikova	Political activist, artist	Soviet Union	
Bernard Tomic	Professional tennis player	Australia	
Ellora Torchia	Actress	United Kingdom	
Uyara Torrente	Musician	Brazil	
Bob Torres	Sociologist	United States	
Lauren Toyota	Television personality	Canada	
Russell Thacher Trall	Physician	United States	
Will Travers	Animal rights activist	United Kingdom	
Lauren Tsai	Illustrator, model, actress	United States	
Gregg Turkington	Comedian	Australia	
Andrew Tyler	Journalist	United Kingdom	
UltraMantis Black	Professional wrestler	United States	
Jean Ure	Writer	United Kingdom	
Mike Vallely	Skateboarder, musician, actor	United States	
Floris van den Berg	Philosopher and author	Netherlands	
Katarina Van Derham	Model	Slovakia	
Christine Vardaros	Cyclist	United States	
Sergio Vega	Musician	United States	
Jaci Velasquez	Singer-songwriter	United States	
Jane Velez-Mitchell	Author	United States	
Dirk Verbeuren	Musician, Drummer	Belgium	
Meredith Vieira	Journalist	United States	
Natalia Villaveces	TV host, writer, producer	Colombia	
Dale Vince	Businessman	United Kingdom	
Kyle Vincent	Singer-songwriter	United States	
Michelle Visage	Television host	United States	
Yolandi Visser	Singer-songwriter, rapper	South Africa	
Doyle Wolfgang von Frankenstein	Musician	United States	
Alexey Voyevoda	Bobsledder	Soviet Union	
Paul Waggoner	Musician	United States	
Vanessa Wagner	Pianist	France	
Louise Wallis	DJ, animal rights activist	United States	
Patty Walters	Musician, YouTuber	United States	
Bill Ward	Musician, drummer	United Kingdom	
Donald Watson	Teacher	United Kingdom	
Paul Watson	Conservationist	Canada	
Maik Weichert	Musician	Germany	
Jona Weinhofen	Musician	Australia	
Paul Wesley	Actor	United States	
Billy West	Voice actor	United States	
Griff Whalen	American football player	United States	
Mike White	Scriptwriter	United States	
Persia White	Actress	United States	
Alissa White-Gluz	Singer-songwriter	Canada	
Lauren Wildbolz	Food activist	Switzerland	
James Wilks	MMA fighter	United States	
will.i.am	Rapper	United States	
Kim A. Williams	Cardiologist	United States	
Ricky Williams	American football player	United States	
Saul Williams	Musician	United States	
Vanessa Estelle Williams	Actress	United States	
Spice Williams-Crosby	Actress	United States	
Chris Williamson	Politician	United Kingdom	
Steven Wilson	Musician	United Kingdom	
Josh Wink	DJ	United States	
Nathan Winograd	Author	United States	
Lisa Winter	Engineer, roboticist, and television personality	United States	
Ed Winters	Author, animal rights activist, educator, YouTuber	United Kingdom	
DeWanda Wise	Actress	United States	
David Wolfe	Author, entrepreneur, raw foodist	United States	
Philip Wollen	Businessman	Australia	
Stevie Wonder	Musician, singer	United States	
Laura Wright	Academic	United States	
Gretchen Wyler	Actress	United States	
Steve Wynn	Entrepreneur	United States	
Jon Wynne-Tyson	Publisher	United Kingdom	
Xenoyr	Singer-songwriter, artist	Australia	
Shmuly Yanklowitz	Activist, writer	United States	
Roger Yates	Sociologist	United Kingdom	
Adam Yauch	Musician	United States	
James Yorkston	Musician	United Kingdom	
Bellamy Young	Actress, producer	United States	
Peter Daniel Young	Animal rights activist	United States	
Gary Yourofsky	Animal rights activist	United States	
Sophie Zaïkowska	Individualist anarchist	France	
Adam Zampa	Cricketer	Australia	
Tamar Zandberg	Politician	Israel	
Sami Zayn	Professional wrestler	Canada	
Benjamin Zephaniah	Poet	United Kingdom	
Michael Zigomanis	Ice hockey player	Canada	
Nick Zinner	Musician, photographer	United States	
Rob Zombie	Musician	United States	
Sheri Moon Zombie	Actress	United States	
Mortimer Zuckerman	Entrepreneur	Canada	

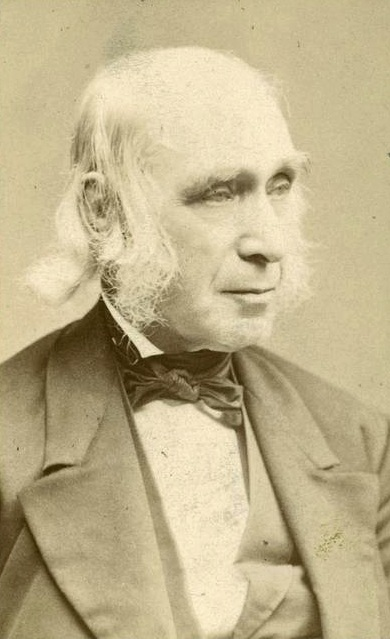
Amos Bronson Alcott, American teacher and activist

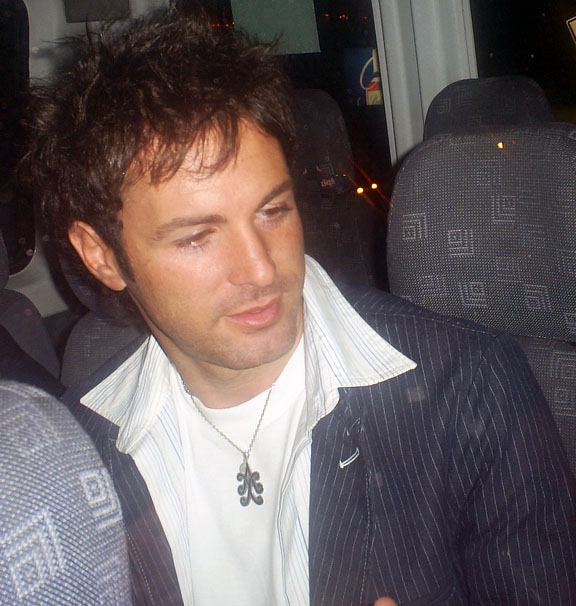
Axel, Argentine singer-songwriter

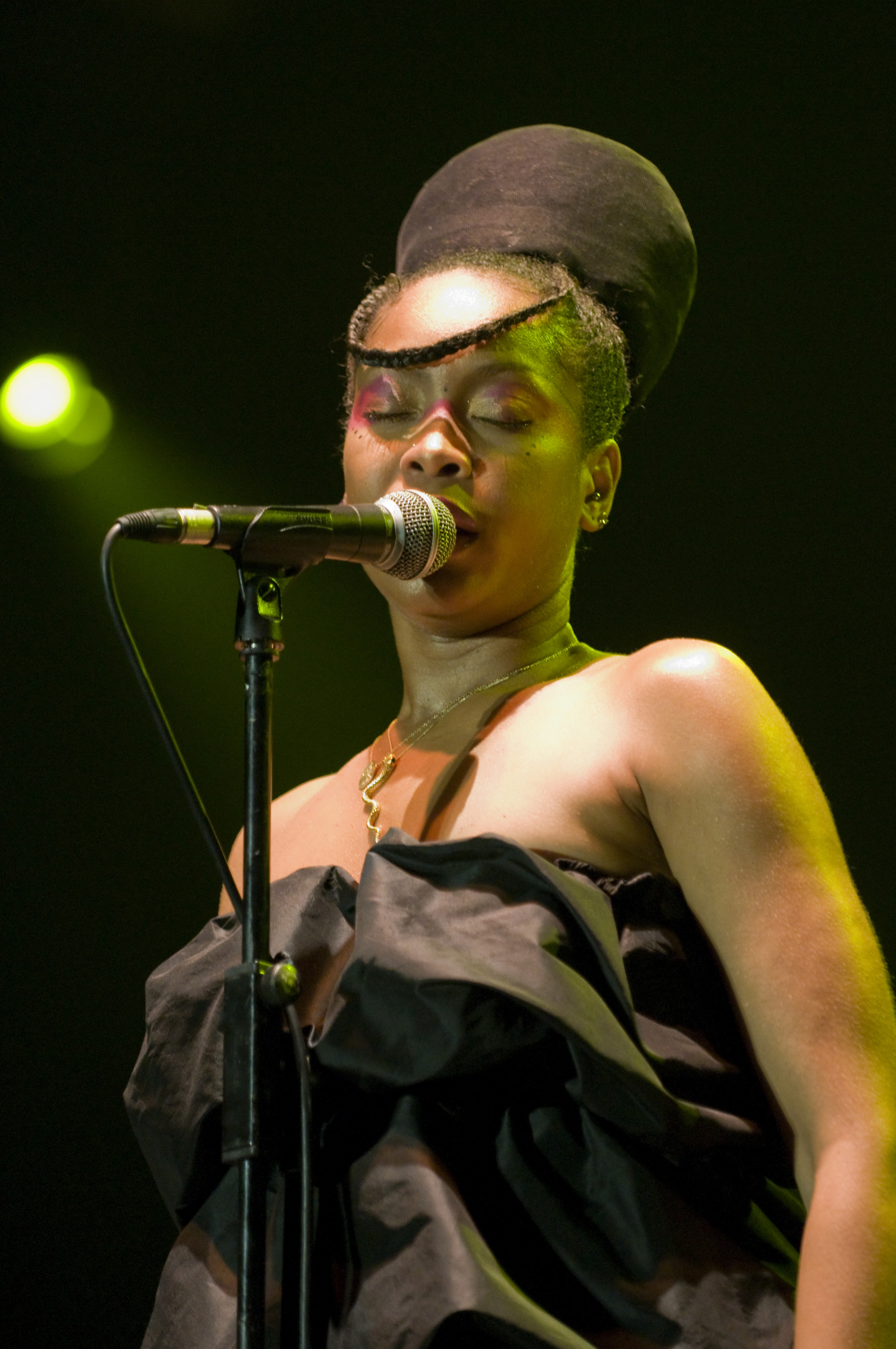
Erykah Badu, American singer-songwriter

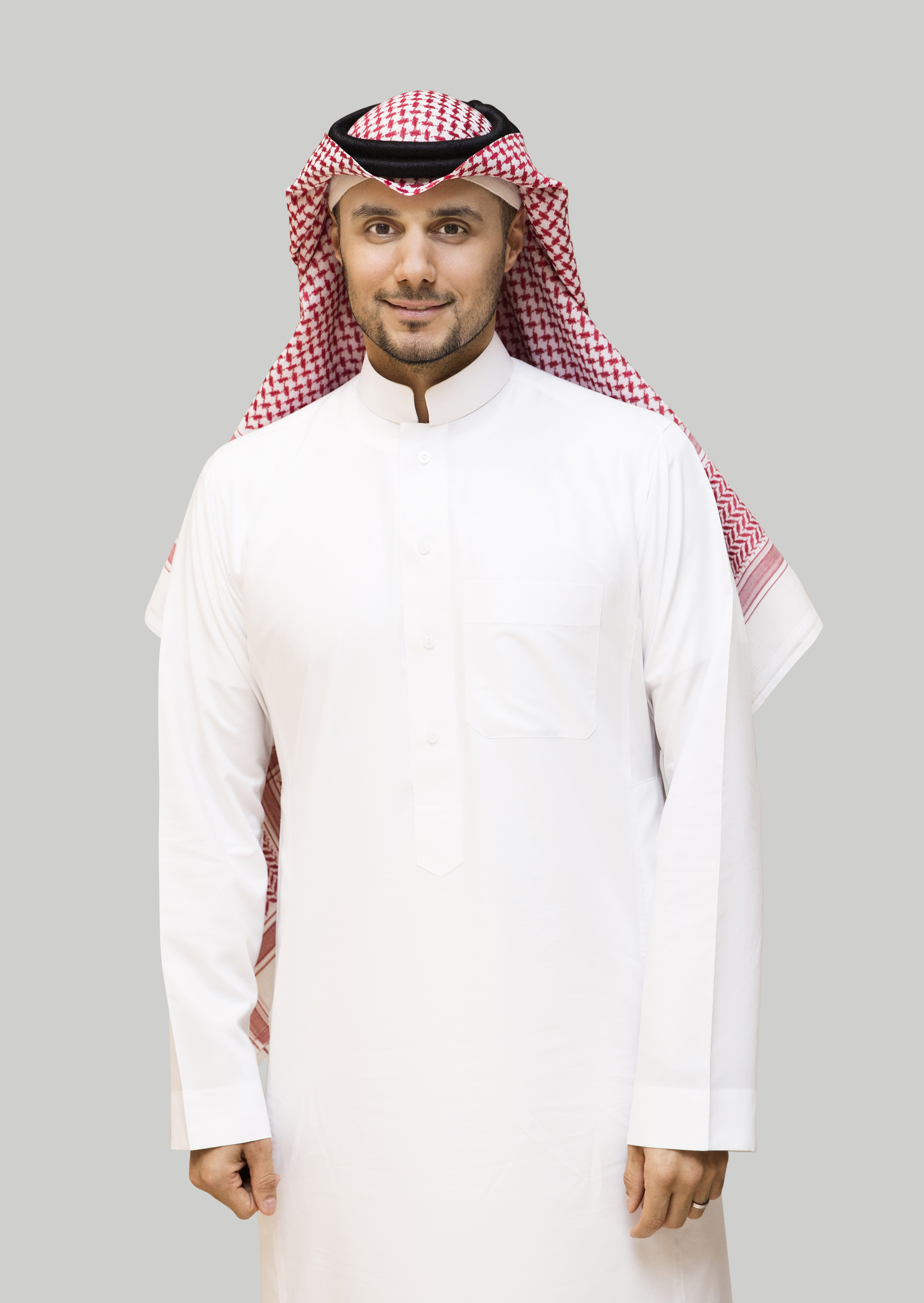
Khaled bin Alwaleed bin Talal, Prince of Saudi Arabia and businessman

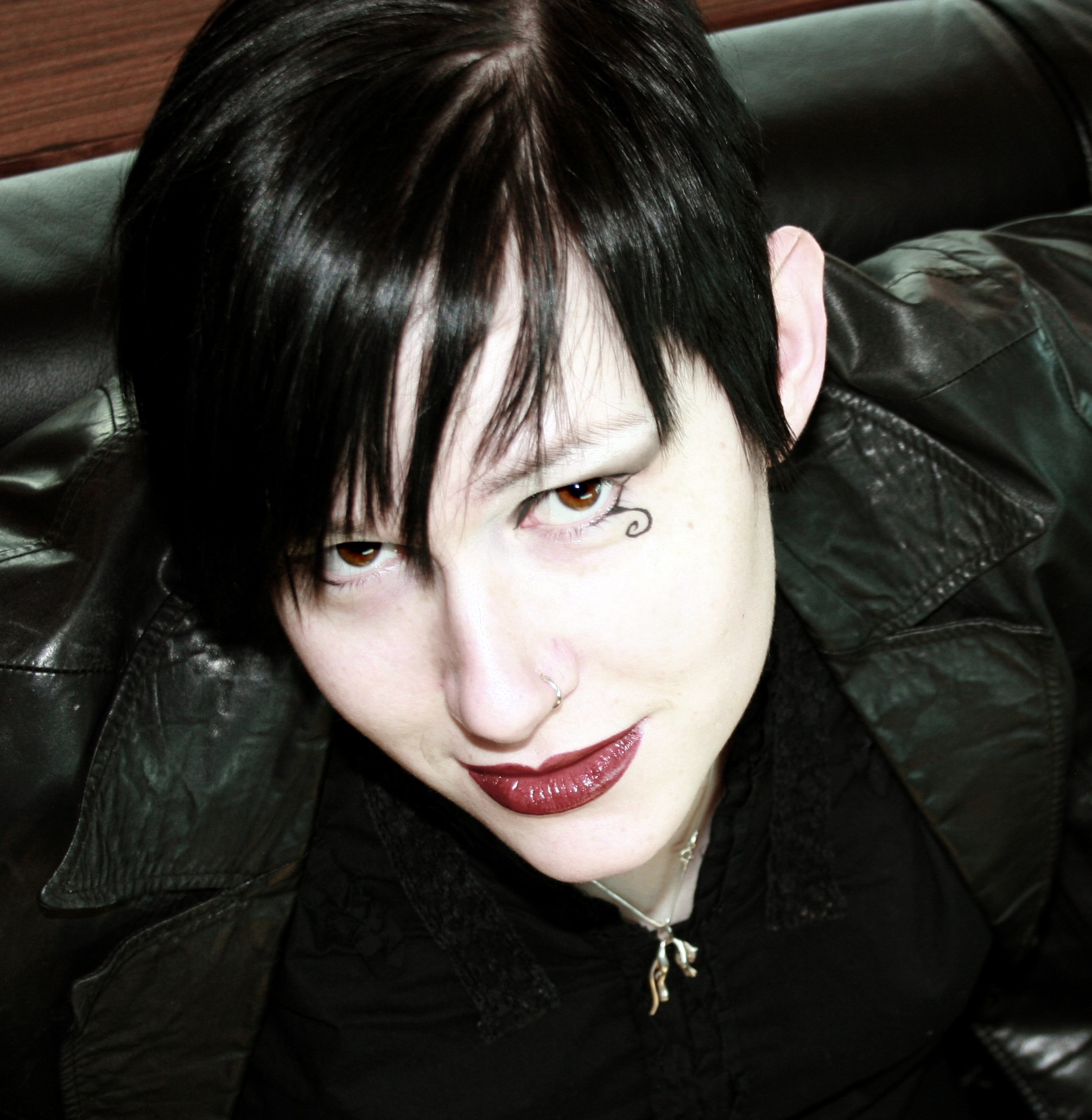
Bethany Black, British comedian

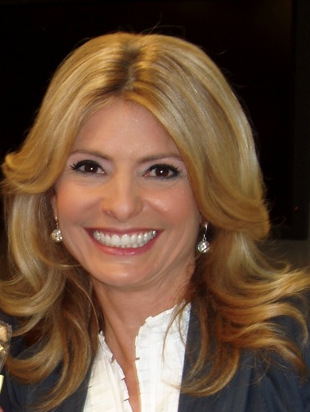
Lisa Bloom, American attorney

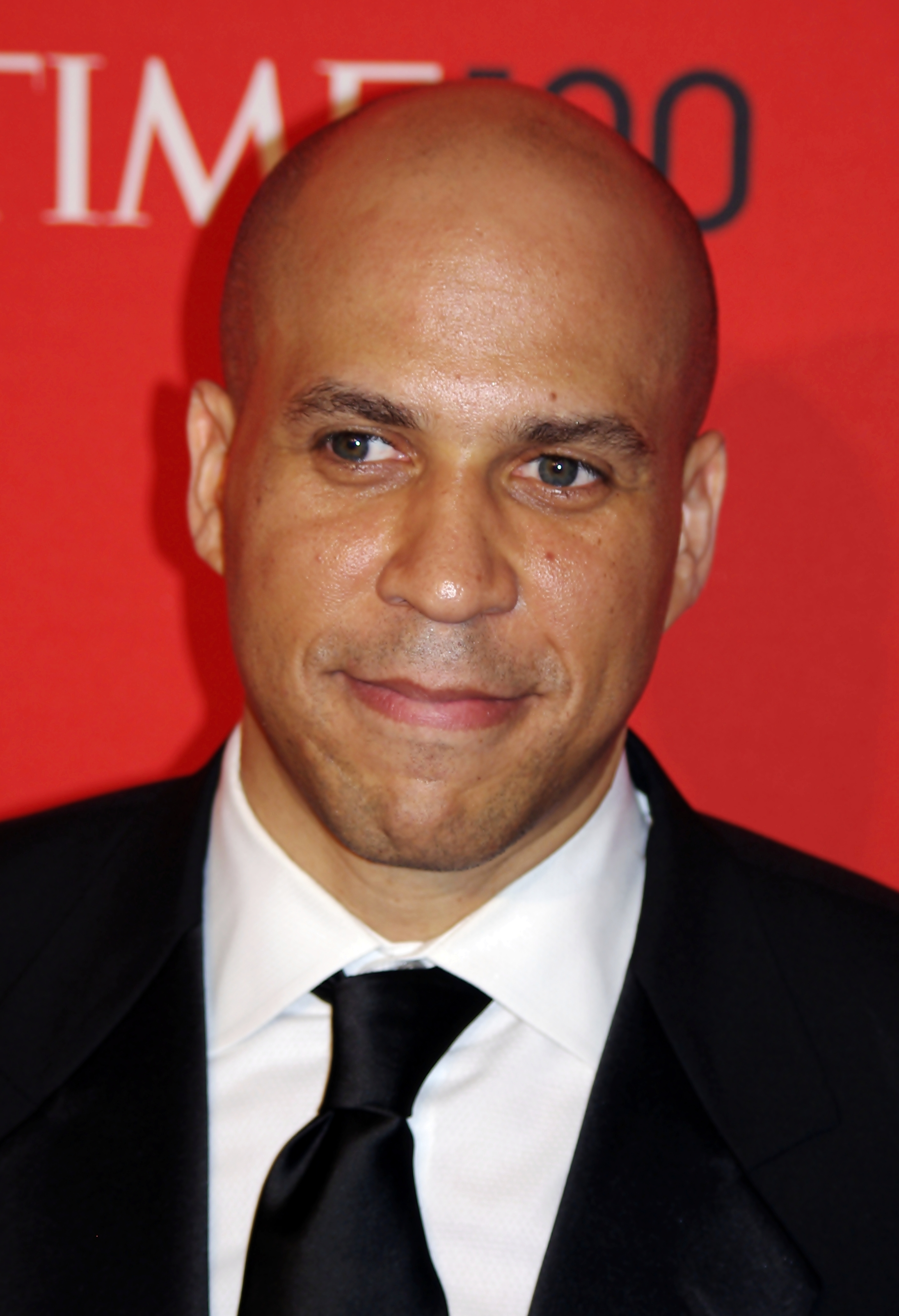
Cory Booker, US Senator (NJ)

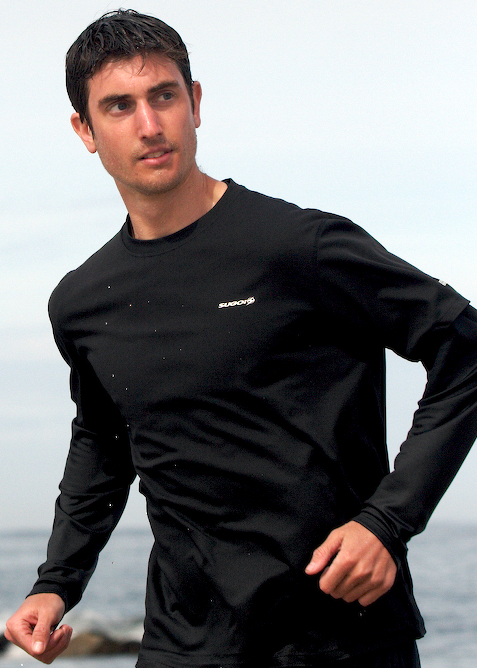
Brendan Brazier, Canadian triathlete

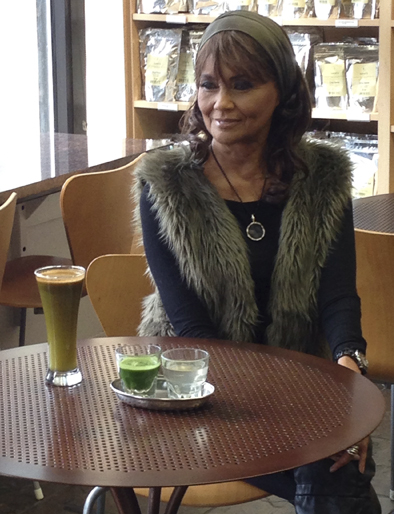
Karyn Calabrese, American chef

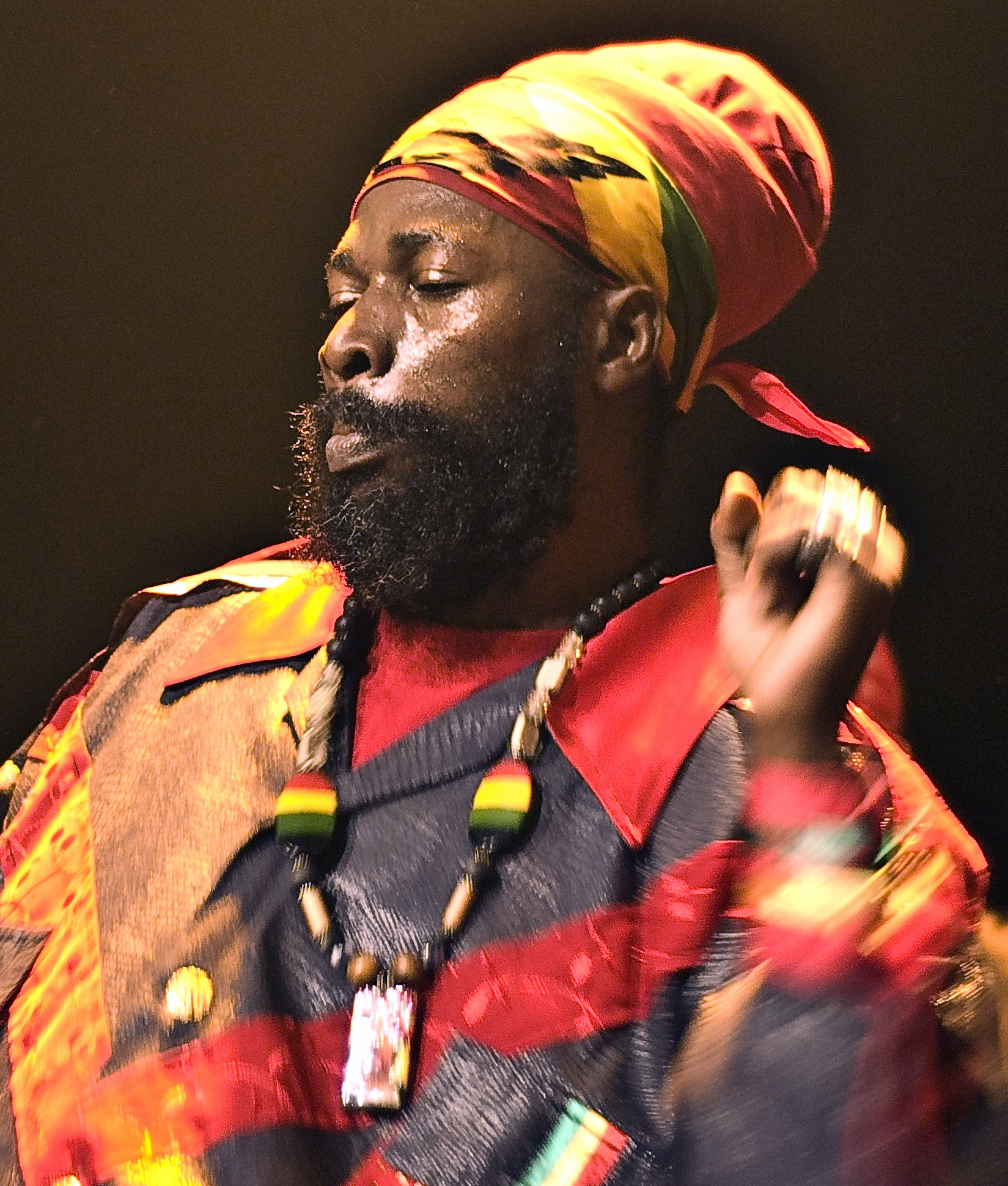
Capleton, Jamaican musician

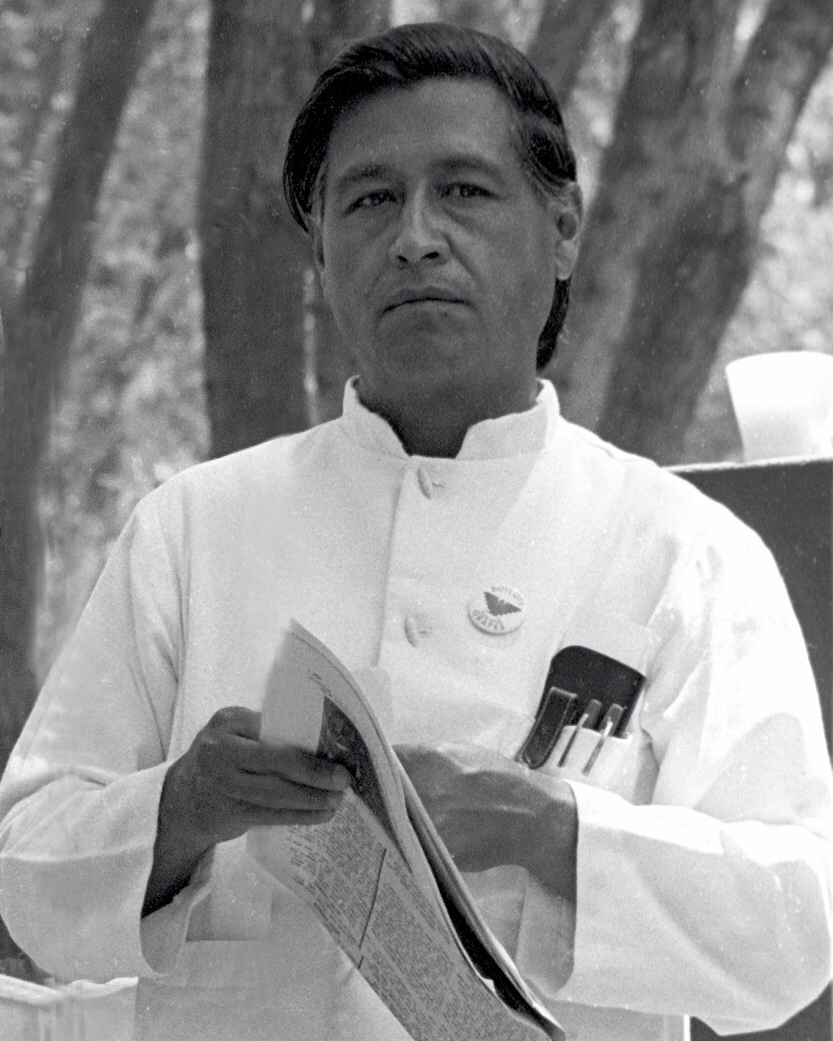
Cesar Chavez, American civil rights activist

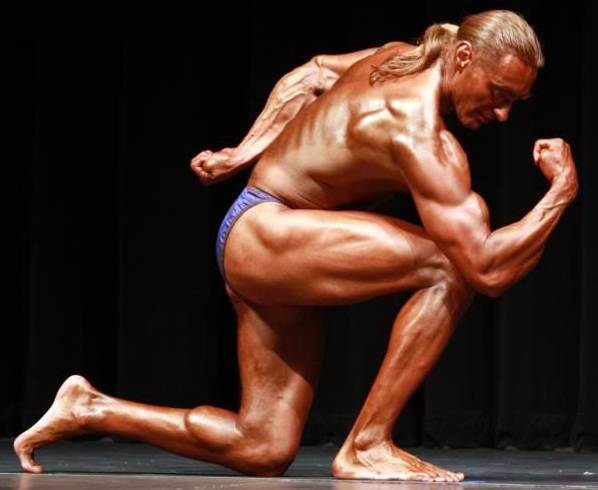
Robert Cheeke, American bodybuilder

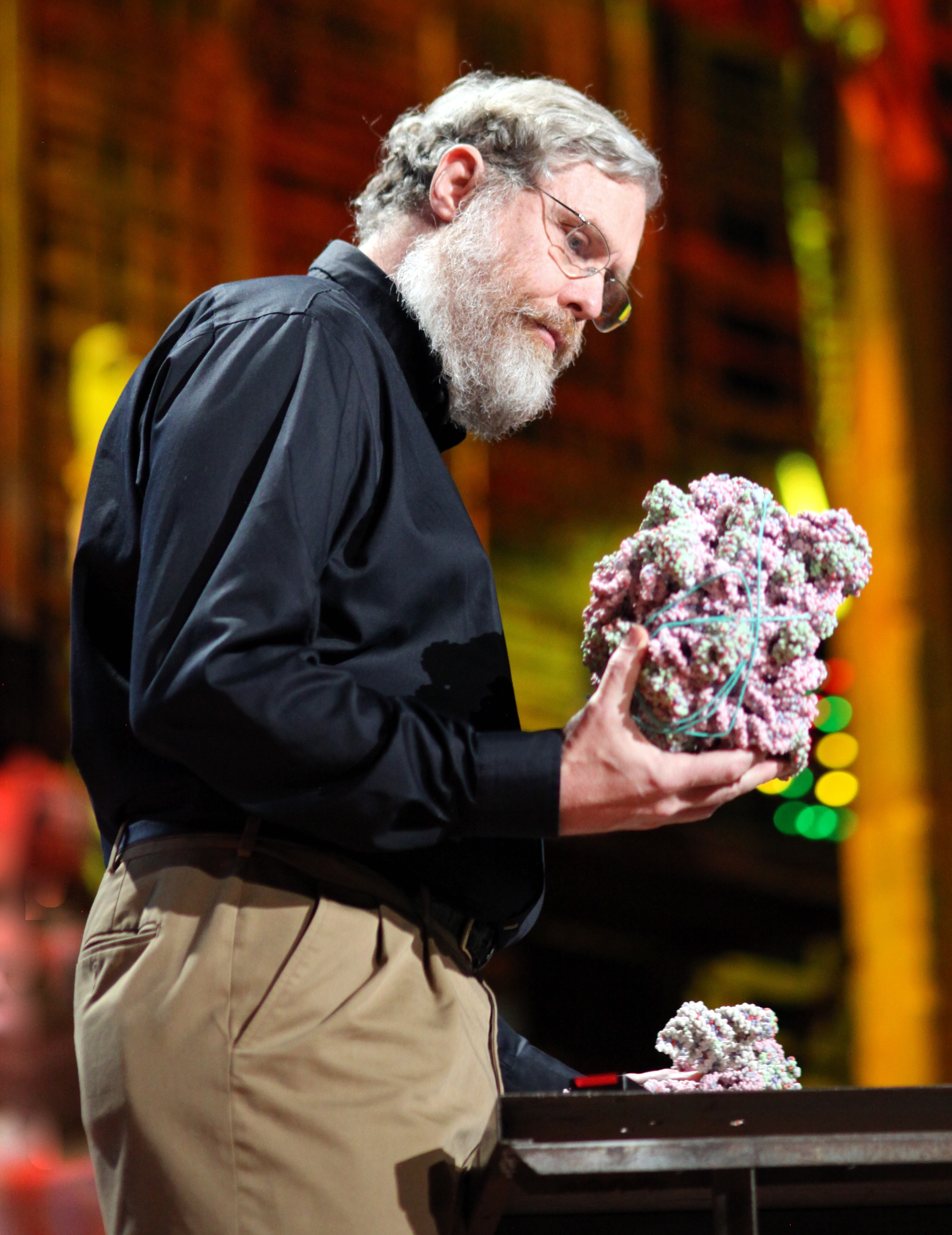
George M. Church, American geneticist

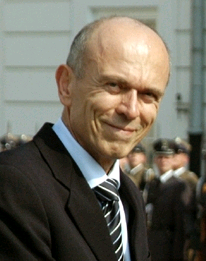
Janez Drnovšek, 2nd president of Slovenia

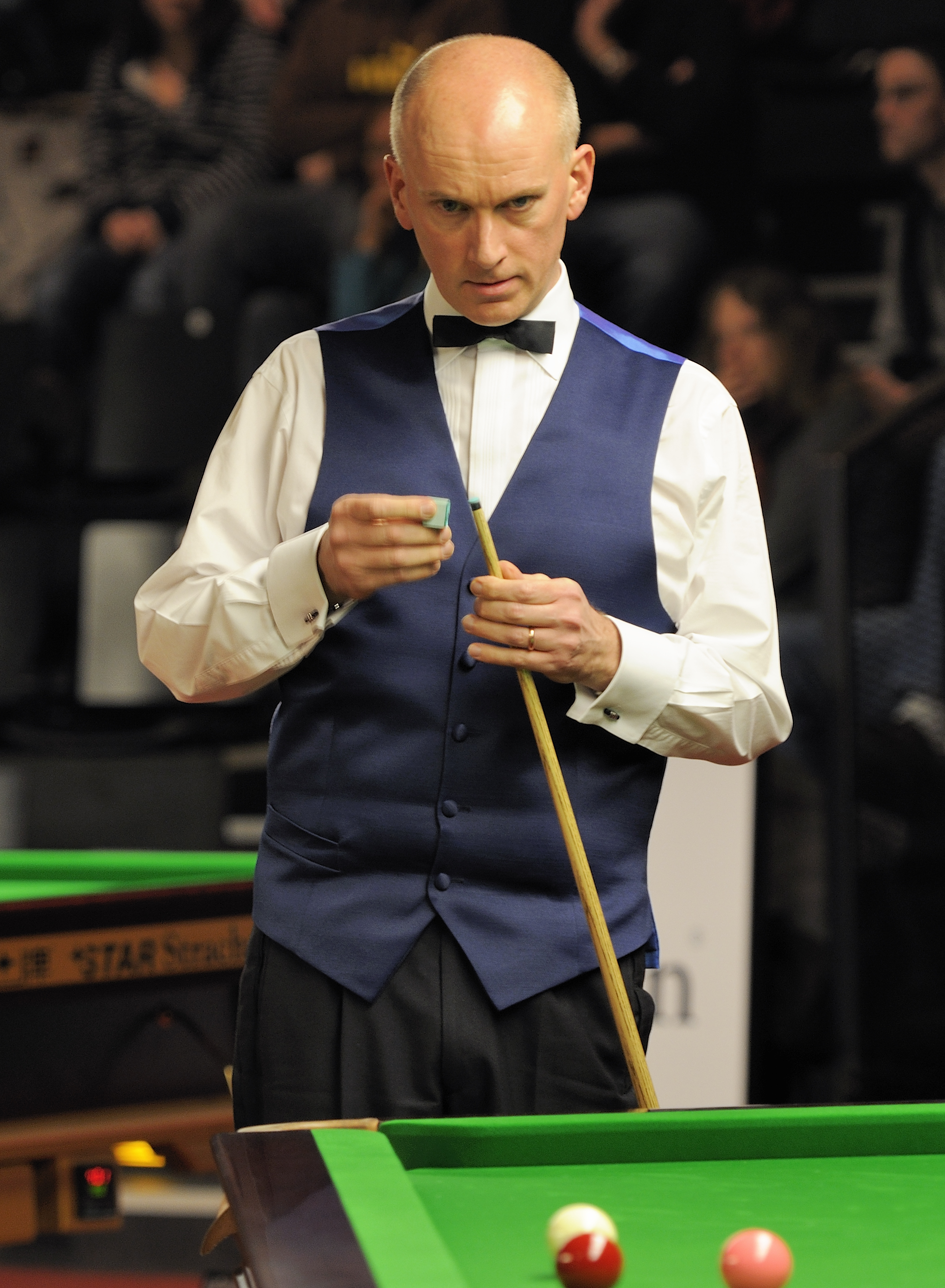
Peter Ebdon, British snooker player

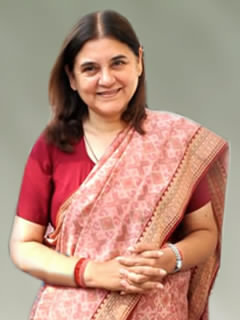
Maneka Gandhi, Indian politician

Al Gore, former US Vice President

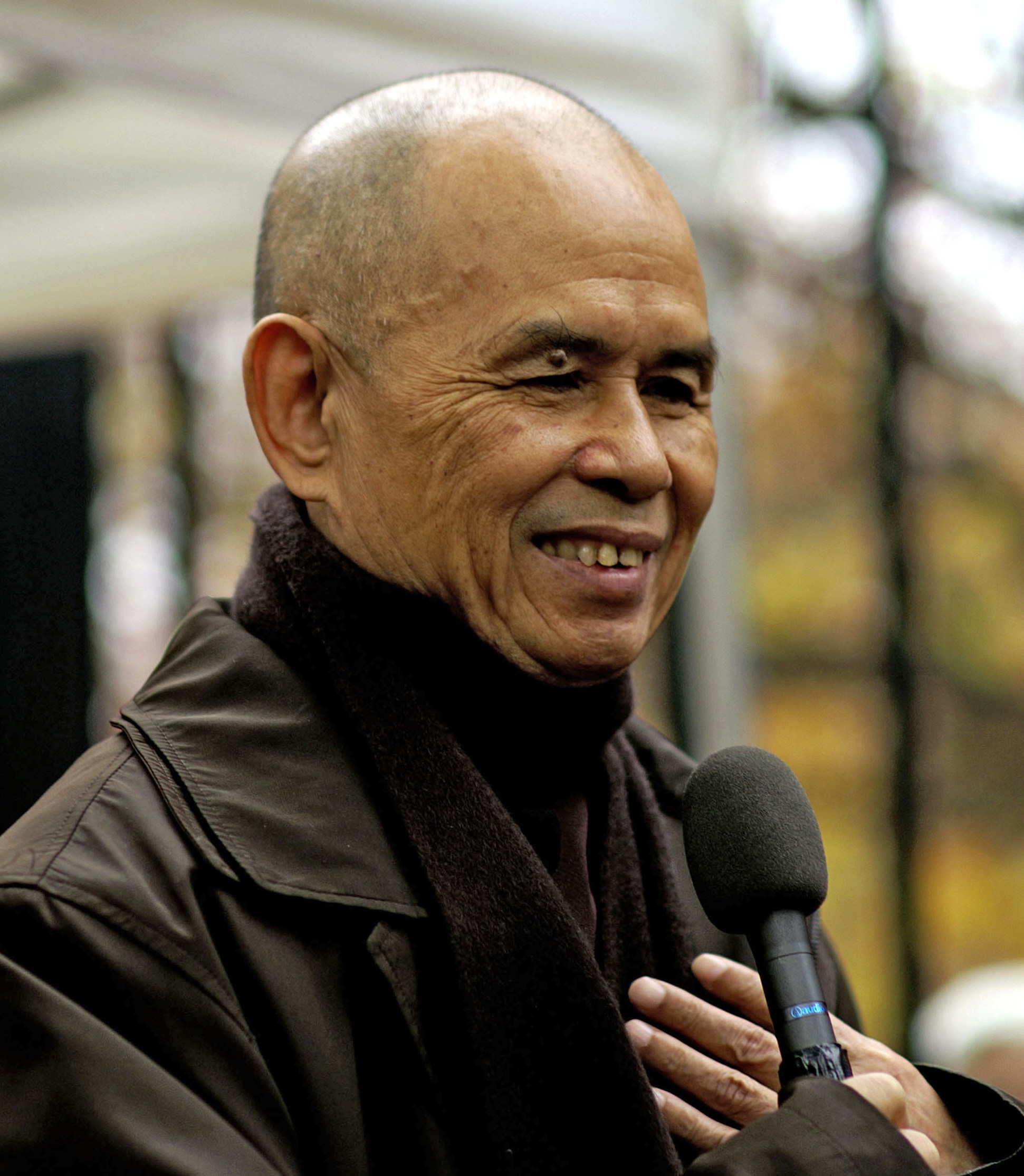
Thích Nhất Hạnh, Vietnamese Buddhist monk

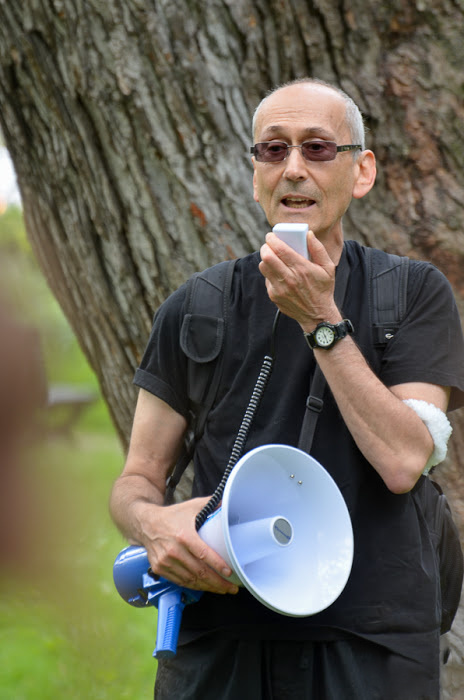
Stevan Harnad, Canadian scientist & activist

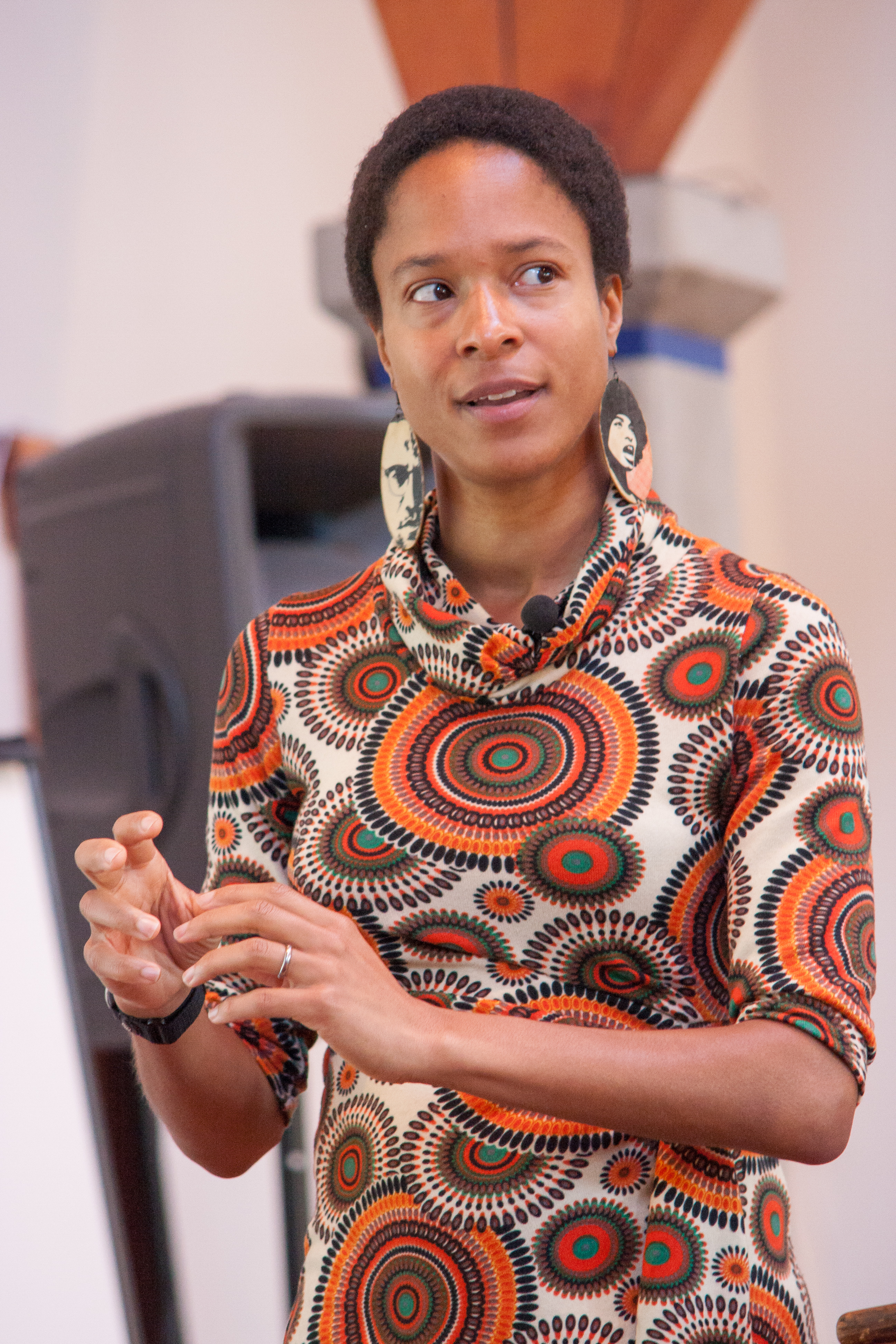
A. Breeze Harper, American academic and activist

Ellie Harrison, British artist

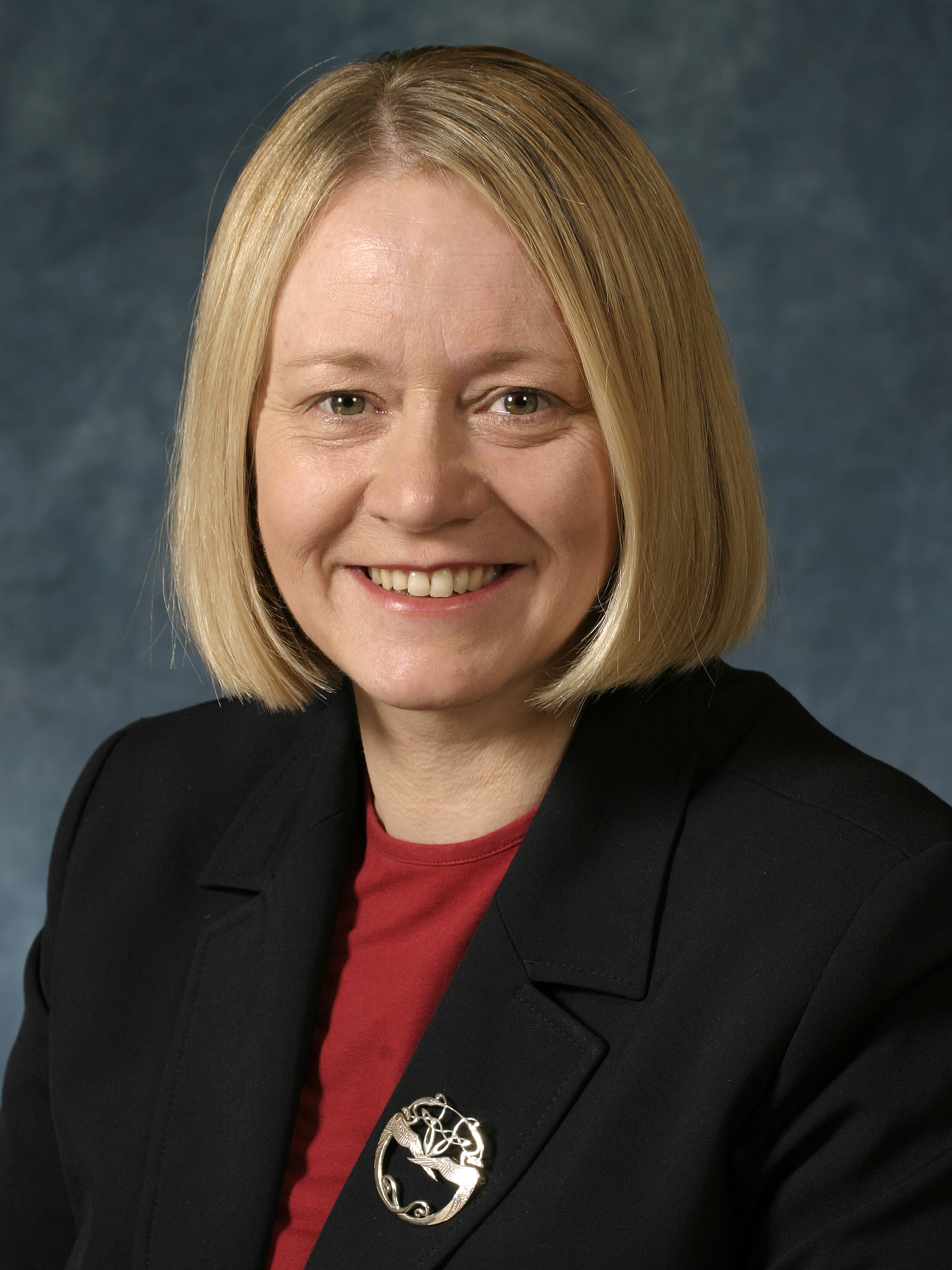
Cathy Jamieson, Scottish politician

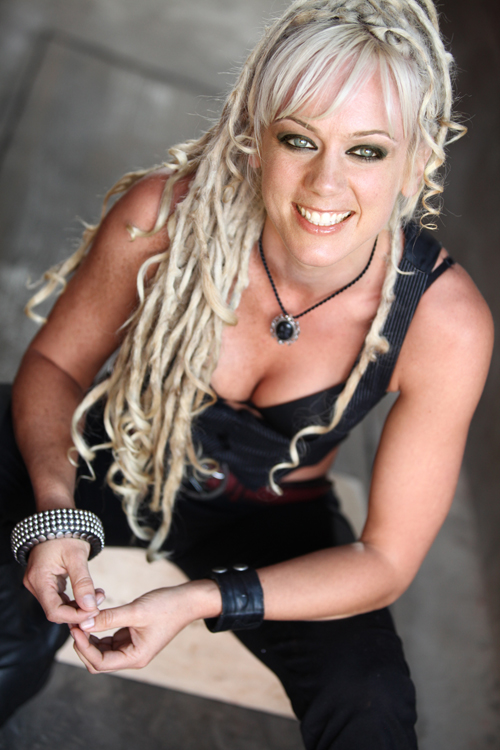
Tonya Kay, American dancer

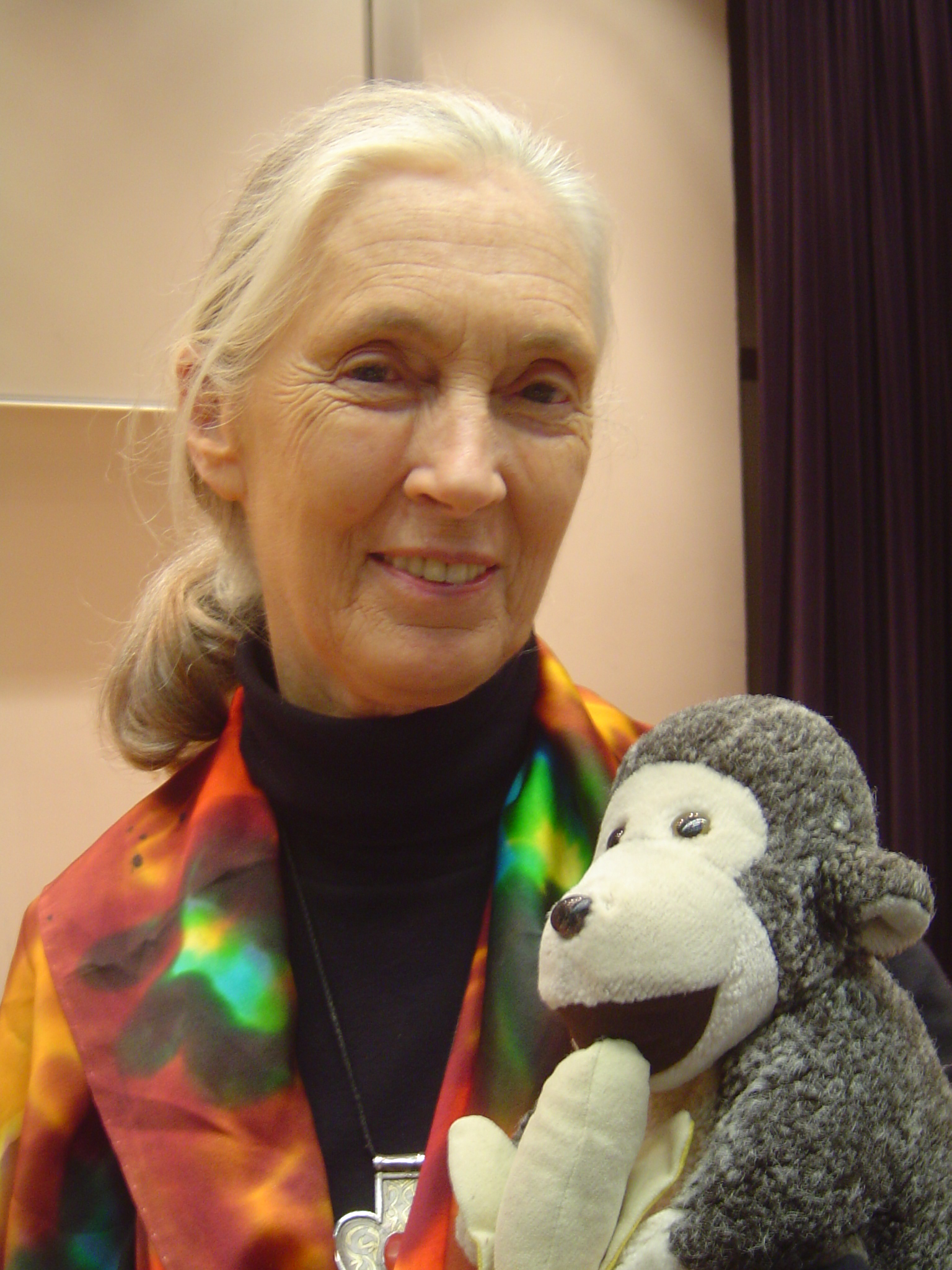
Jane Goodall, British primatologist

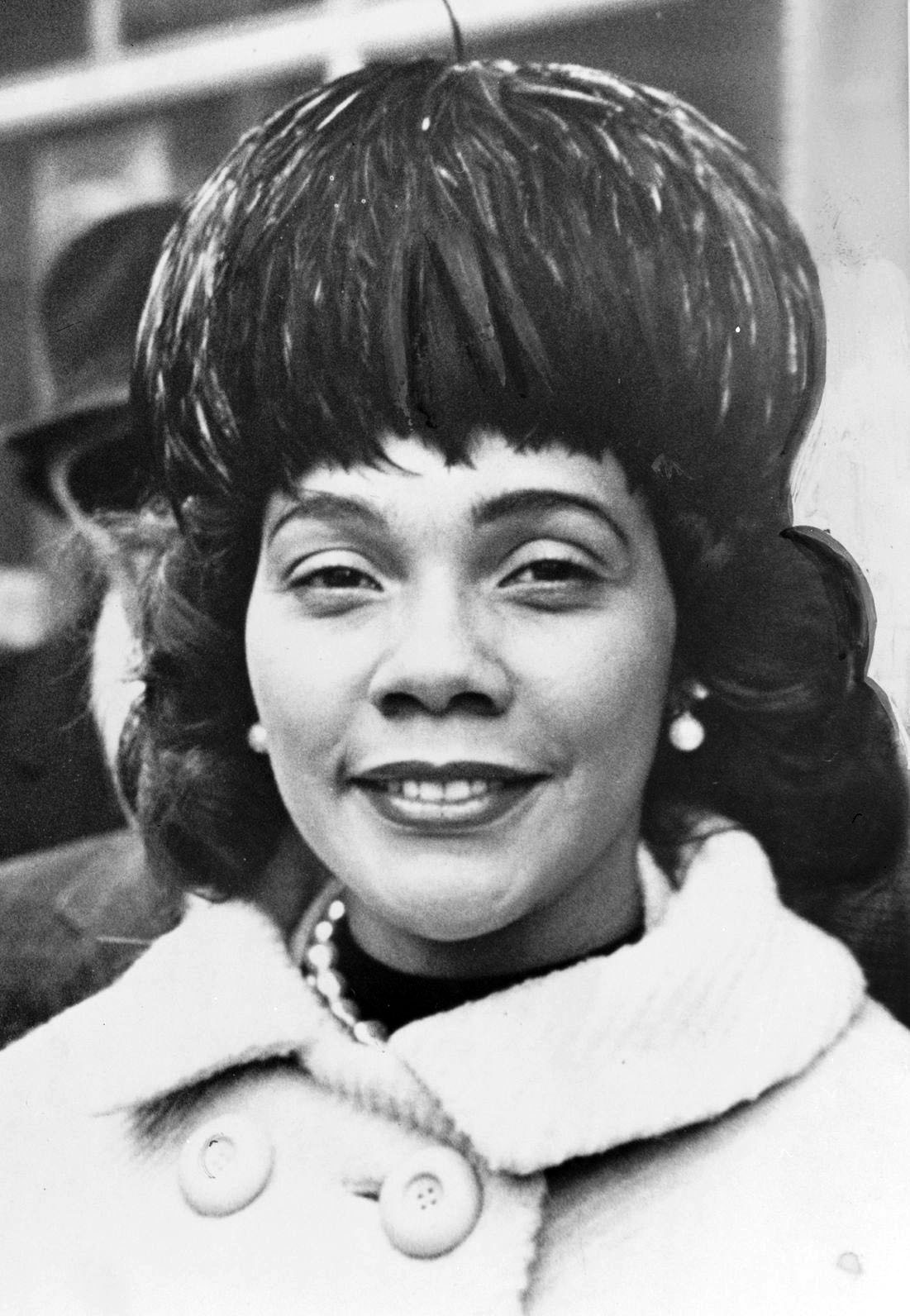
Coretta Scott King, American civil rights activist

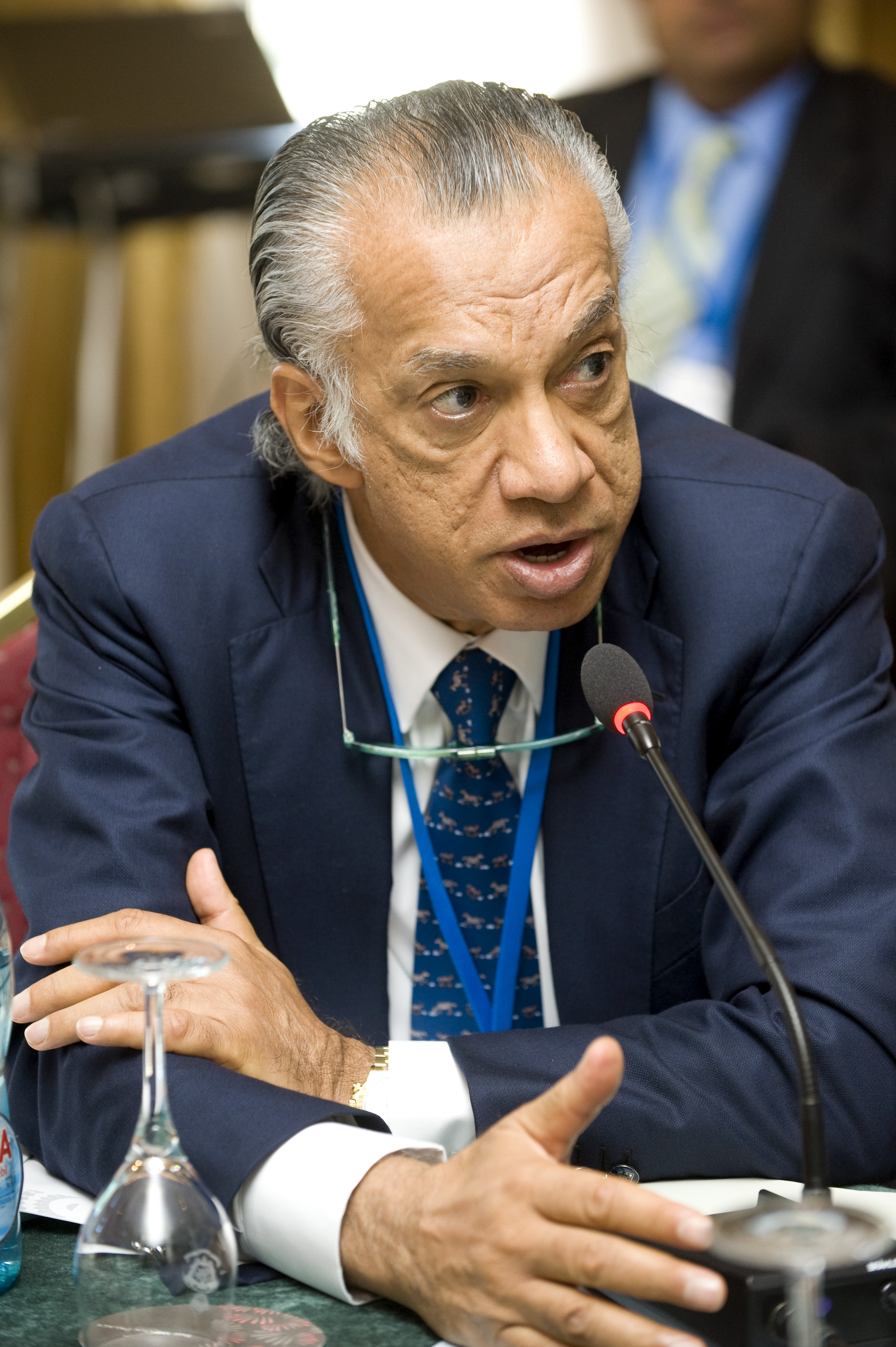
Gulu Lalvani, Indian businessman

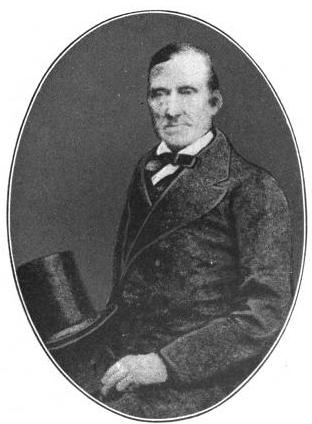
Charles Lane, English-American transcendentalist

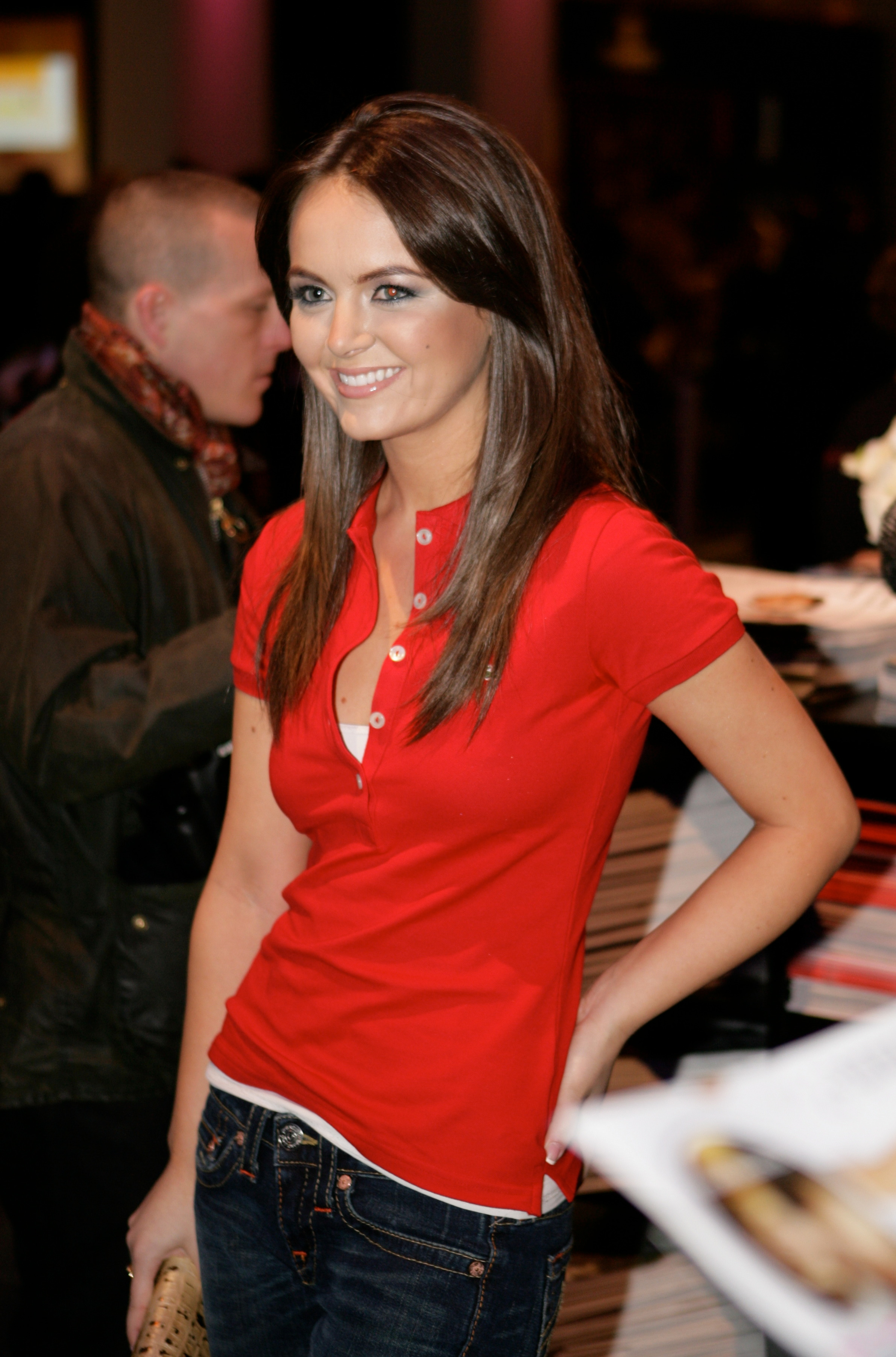
Nicole Lapin, American news anchor

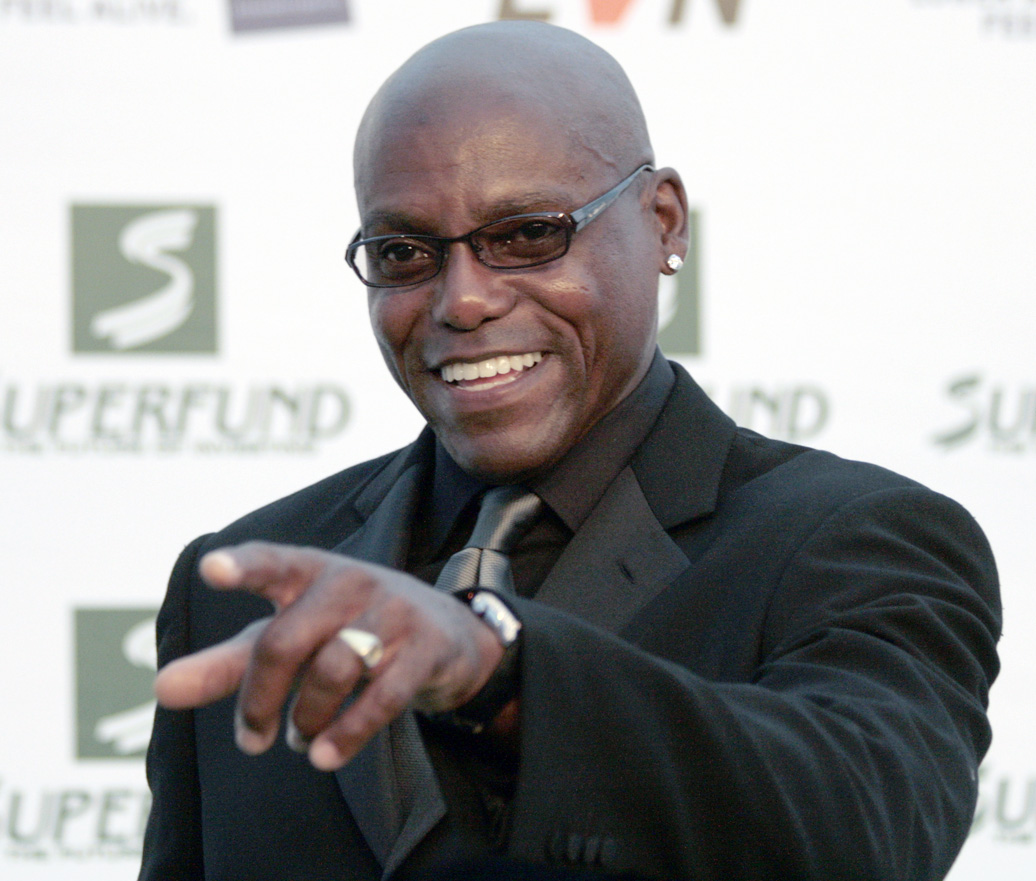
Carl Lewis, American athlete

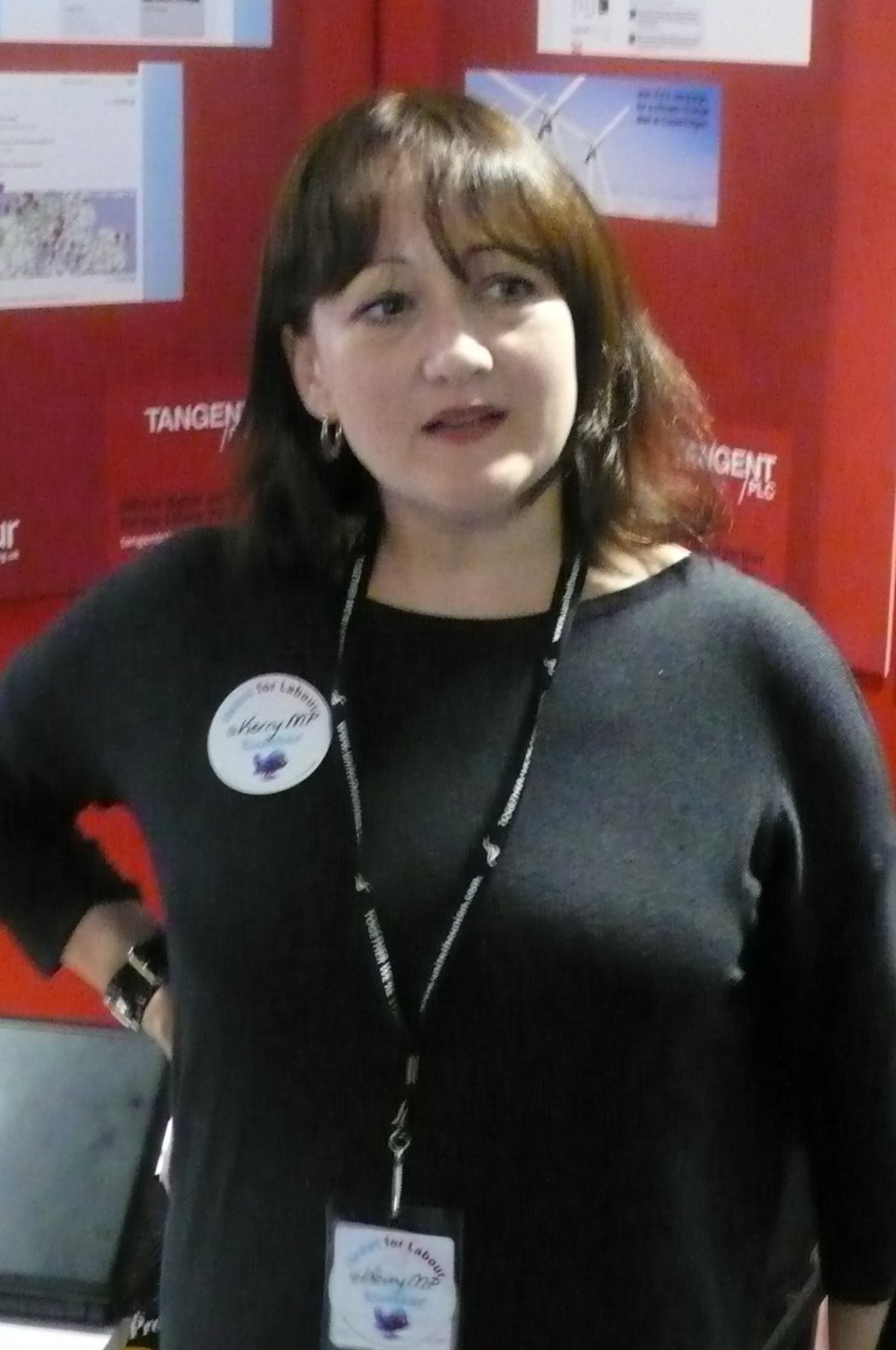
Kerry McCarthy, British politician

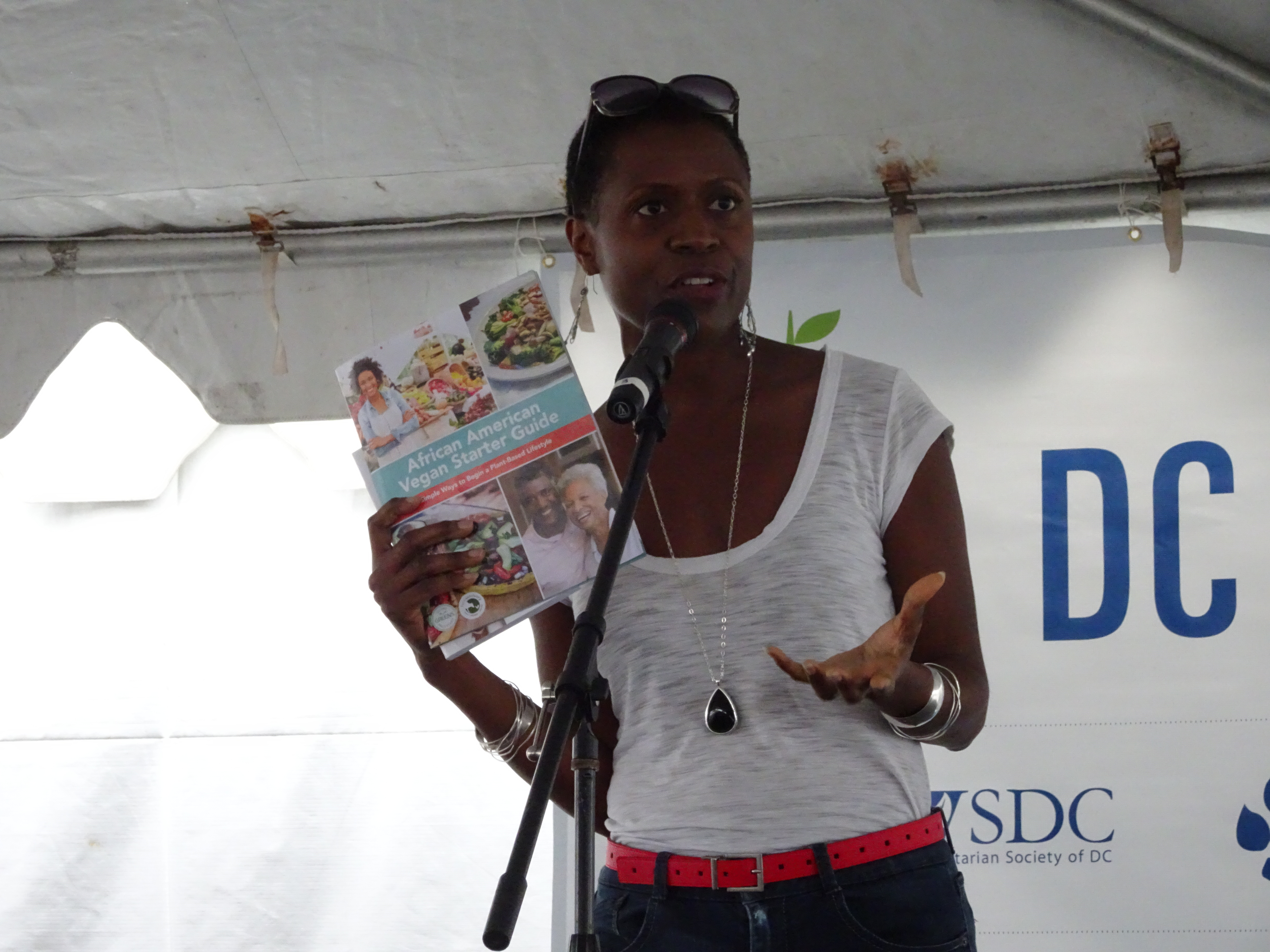
Tracye McQuirter, Vegan Activist

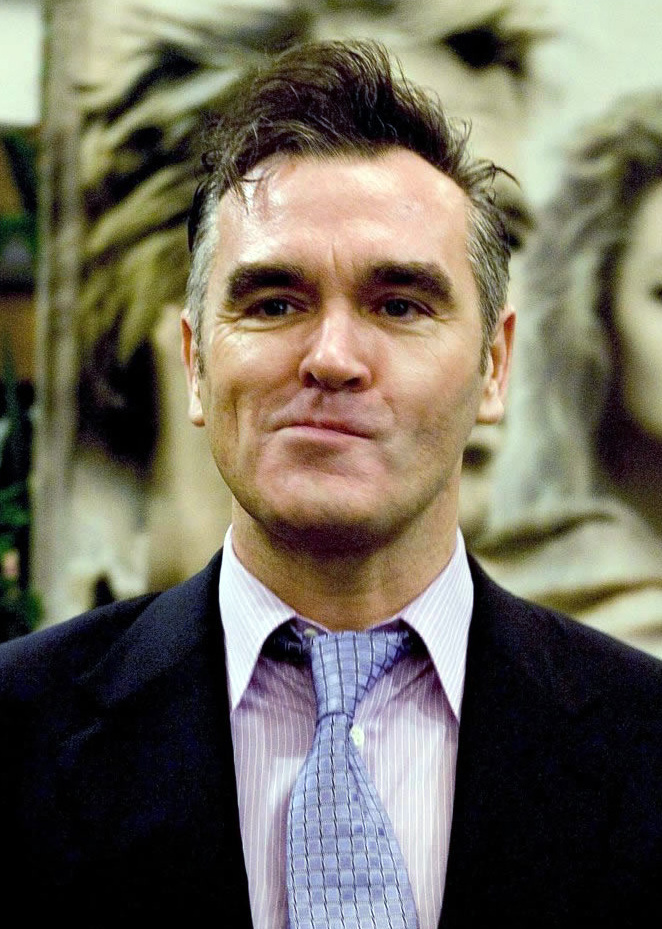
Morrissey, a British singer-songwriter

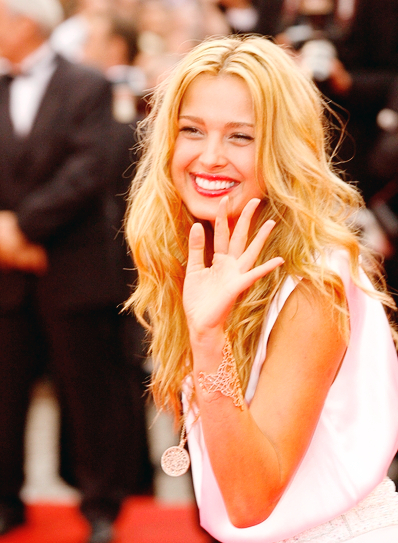
Petra Němcová, Czech model

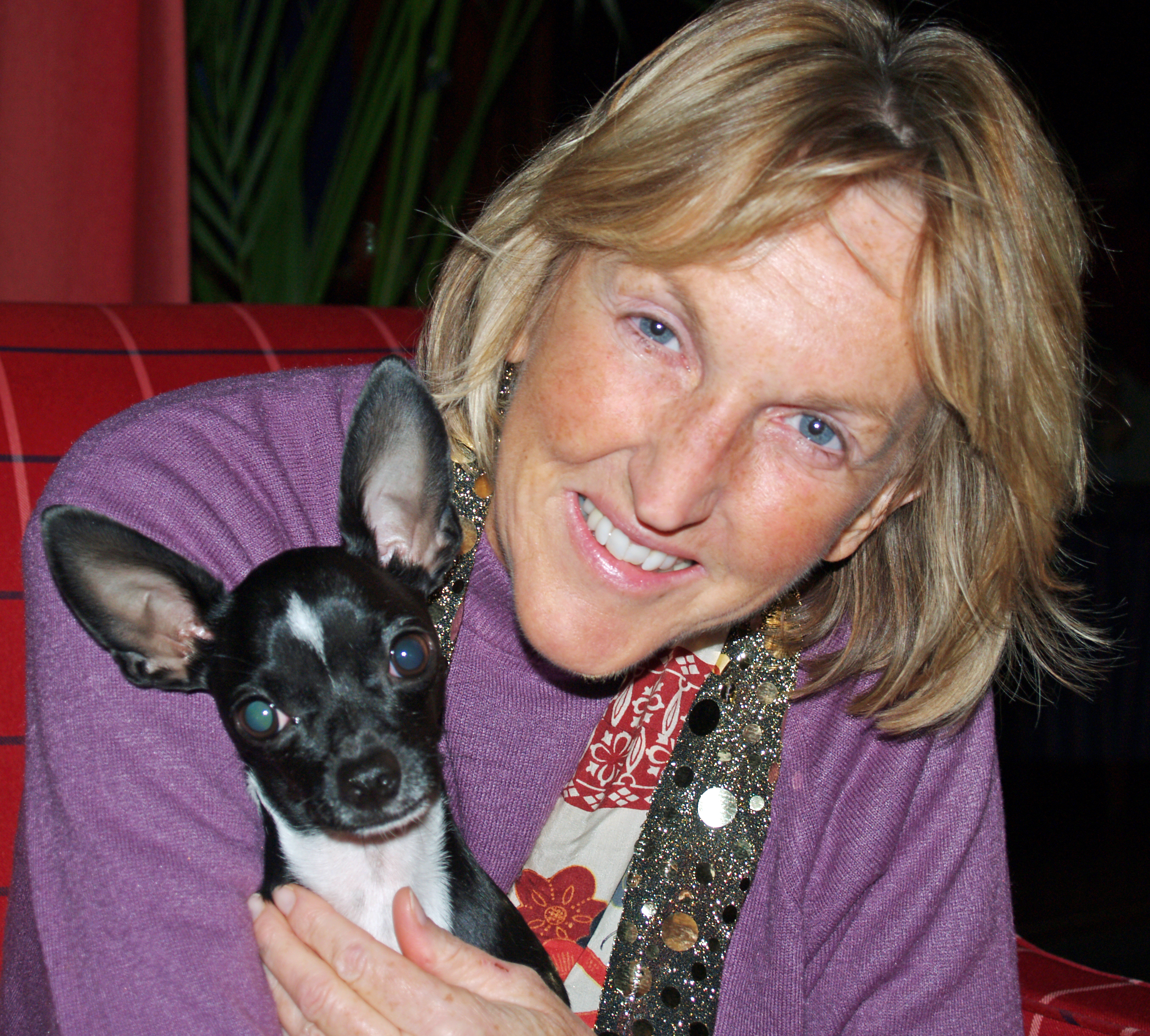
Ingrid Newkirk, British president of People for the Ethical Treatment of Animals

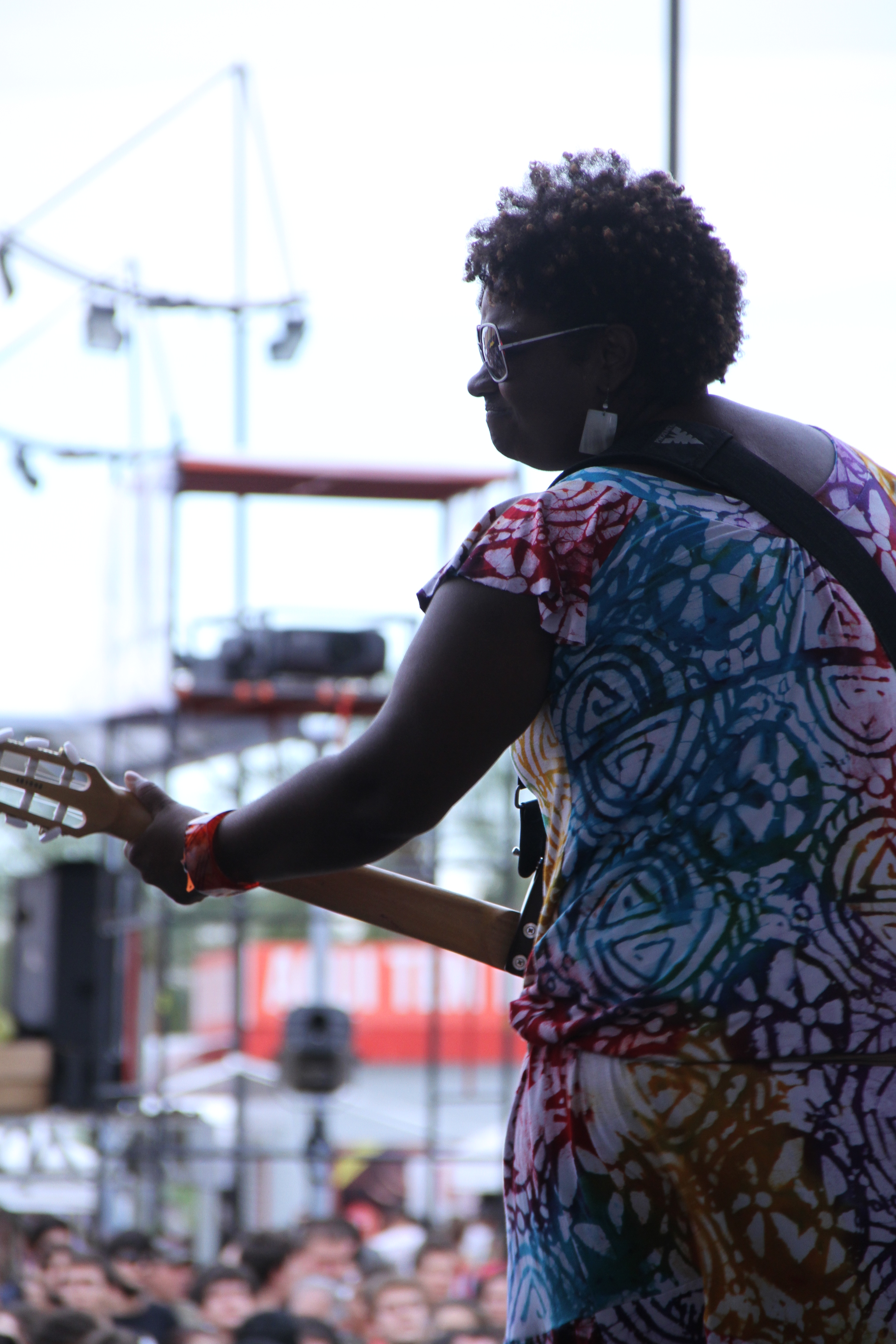
Ellen Oléria, Brazilian singer-songwriter

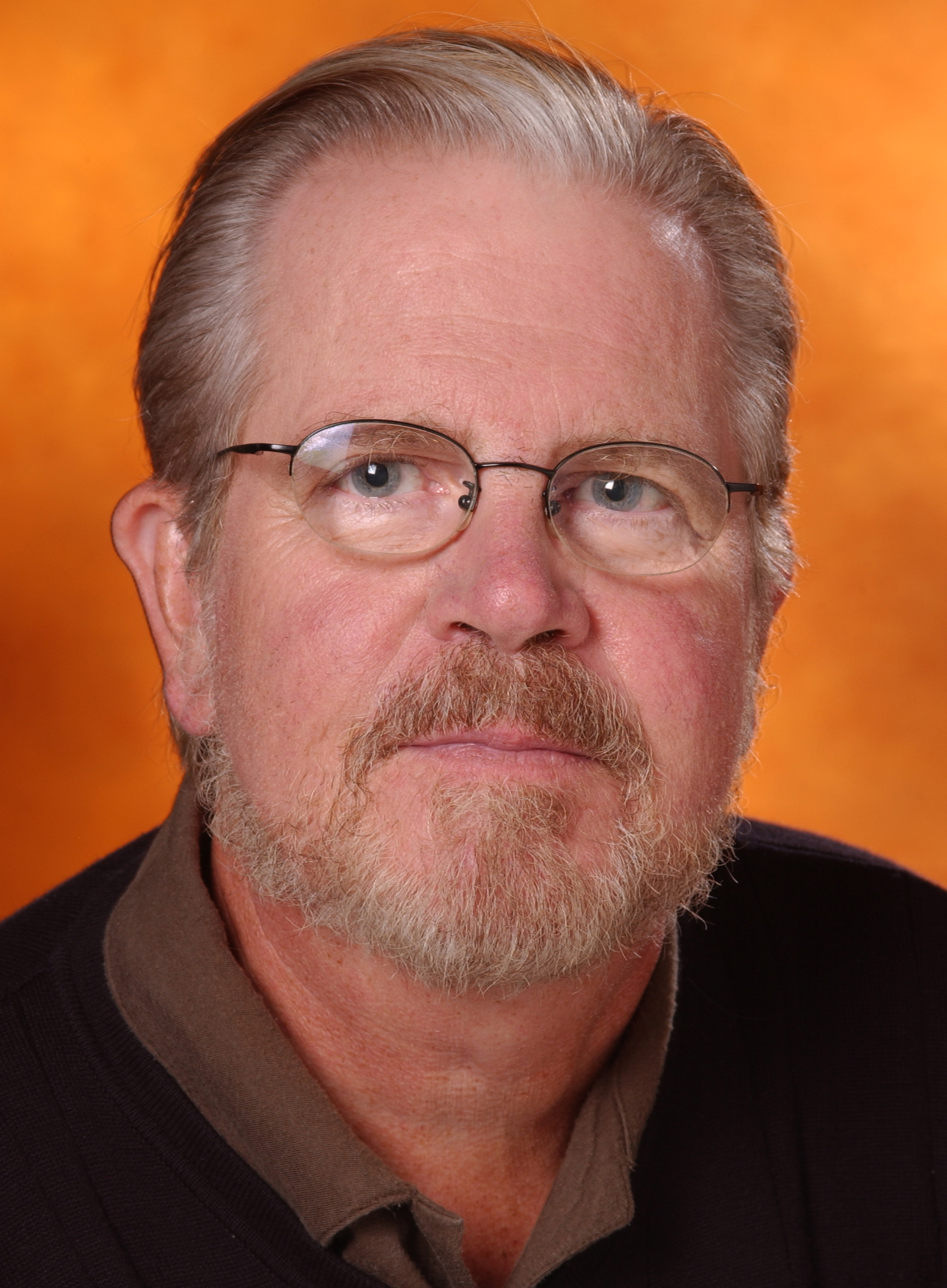
Tom Regan, American philosopher specializing in animal rights

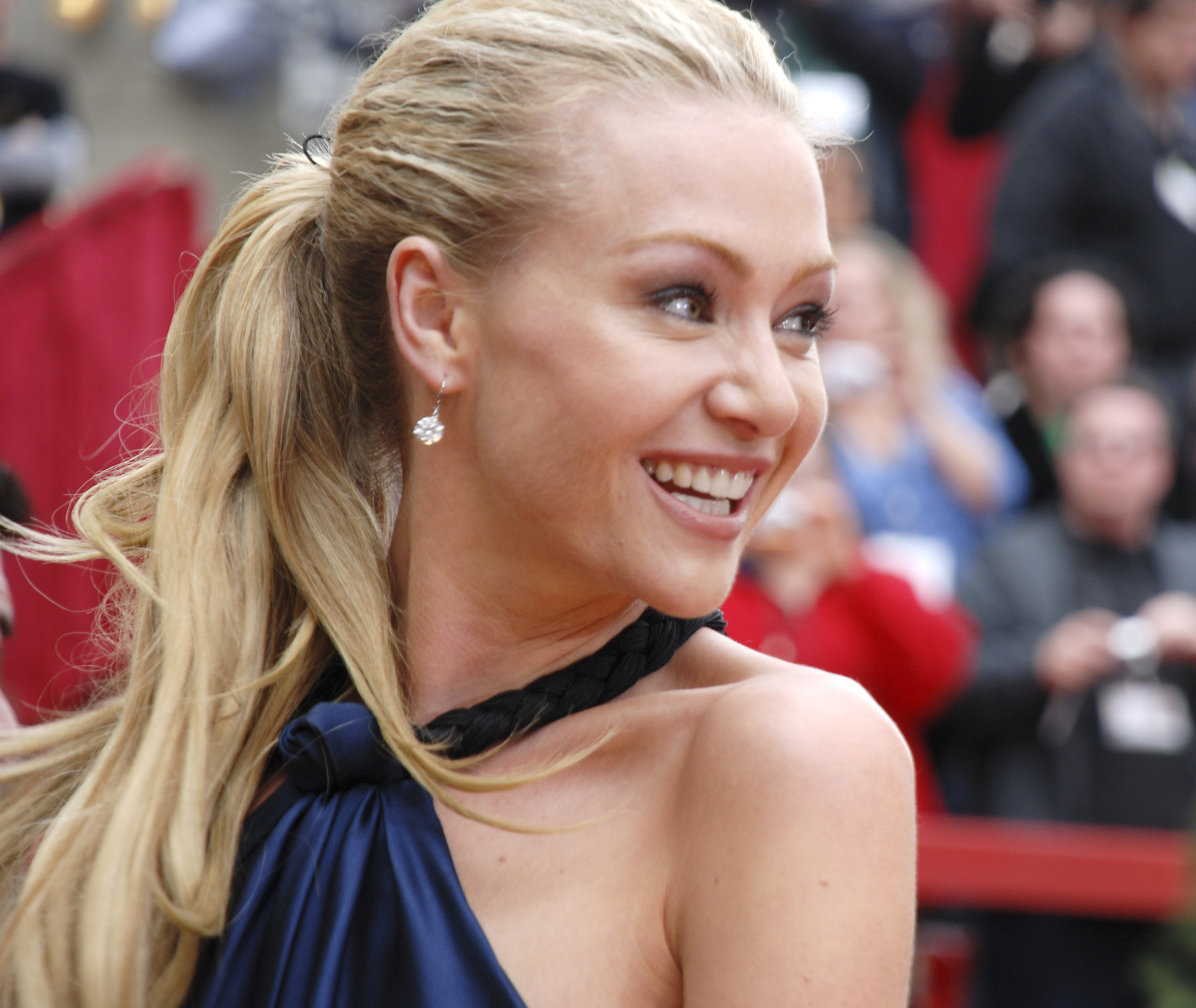
Portia de Rossi, Australian actress

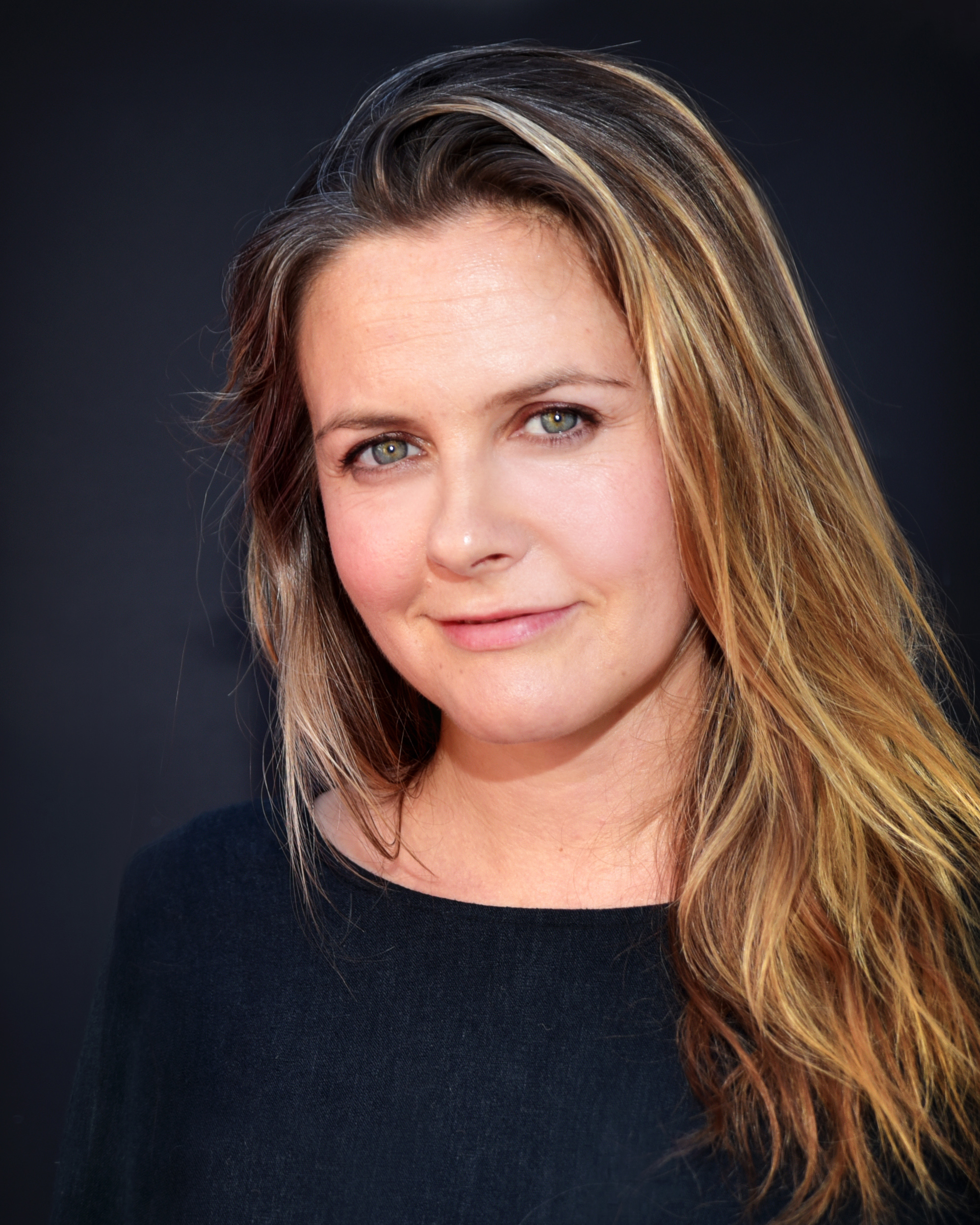
Alicia Silverstone, American actress

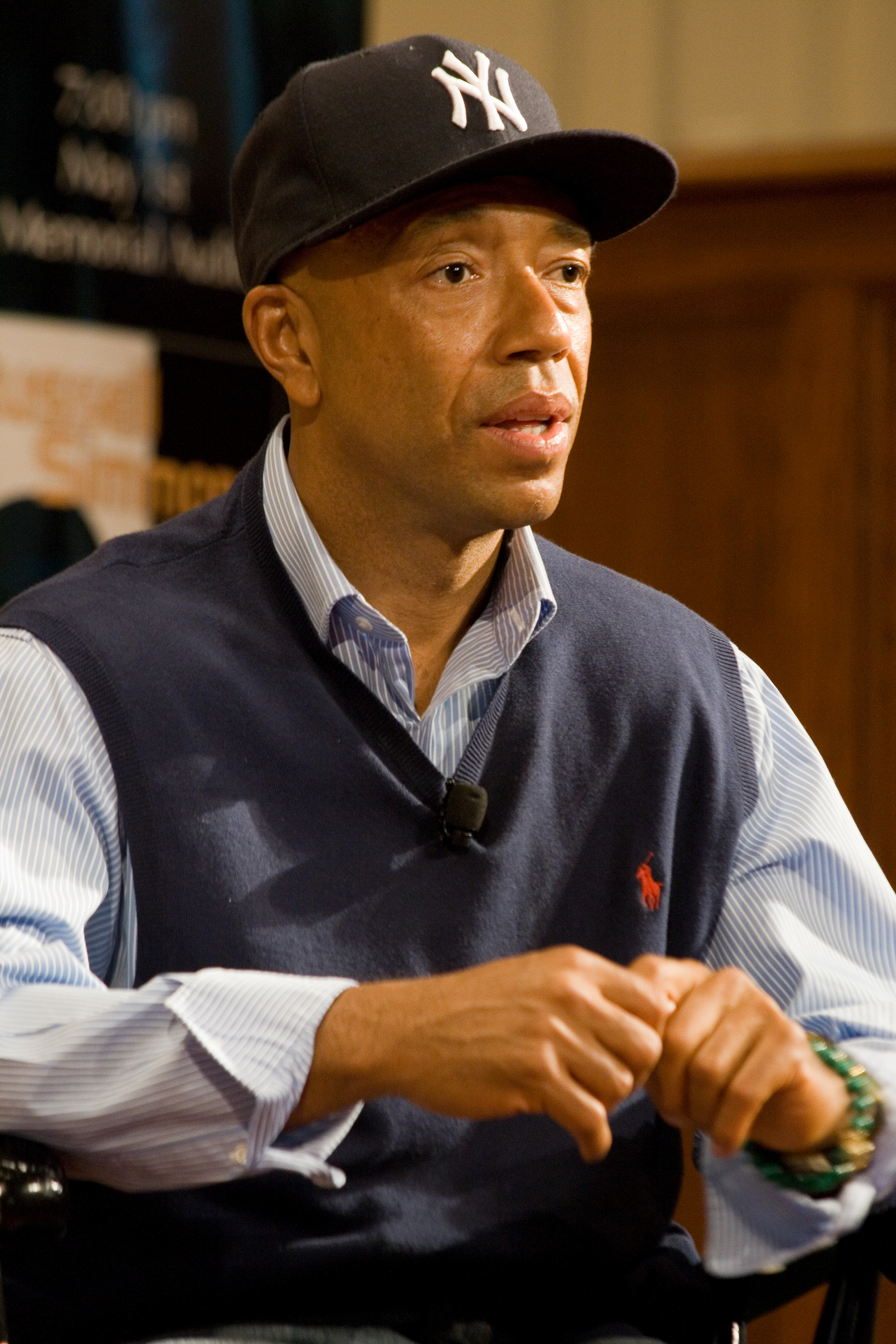
Russell Simmons, American entrepreneur

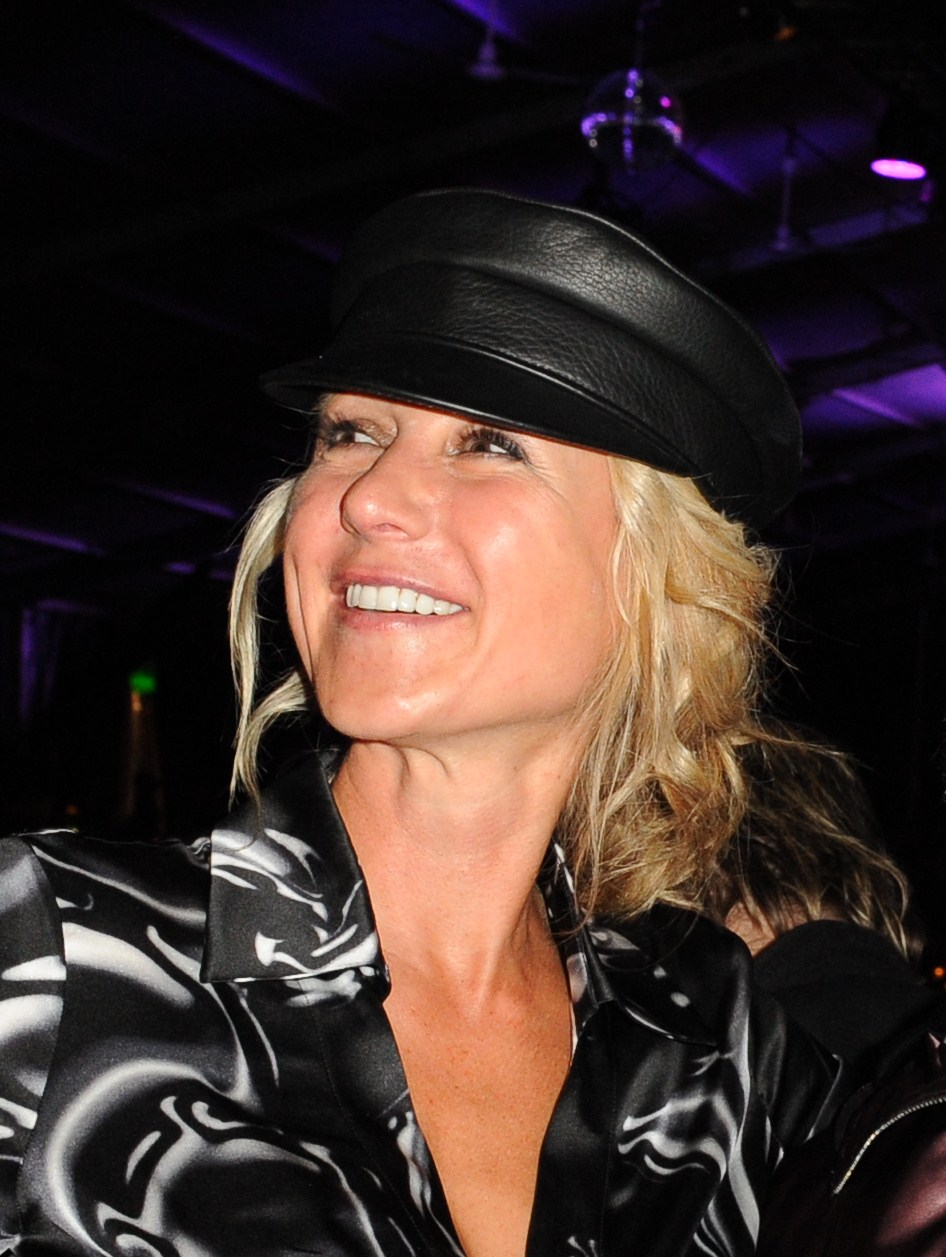
Belinda Stronach, Canadian businesswoman

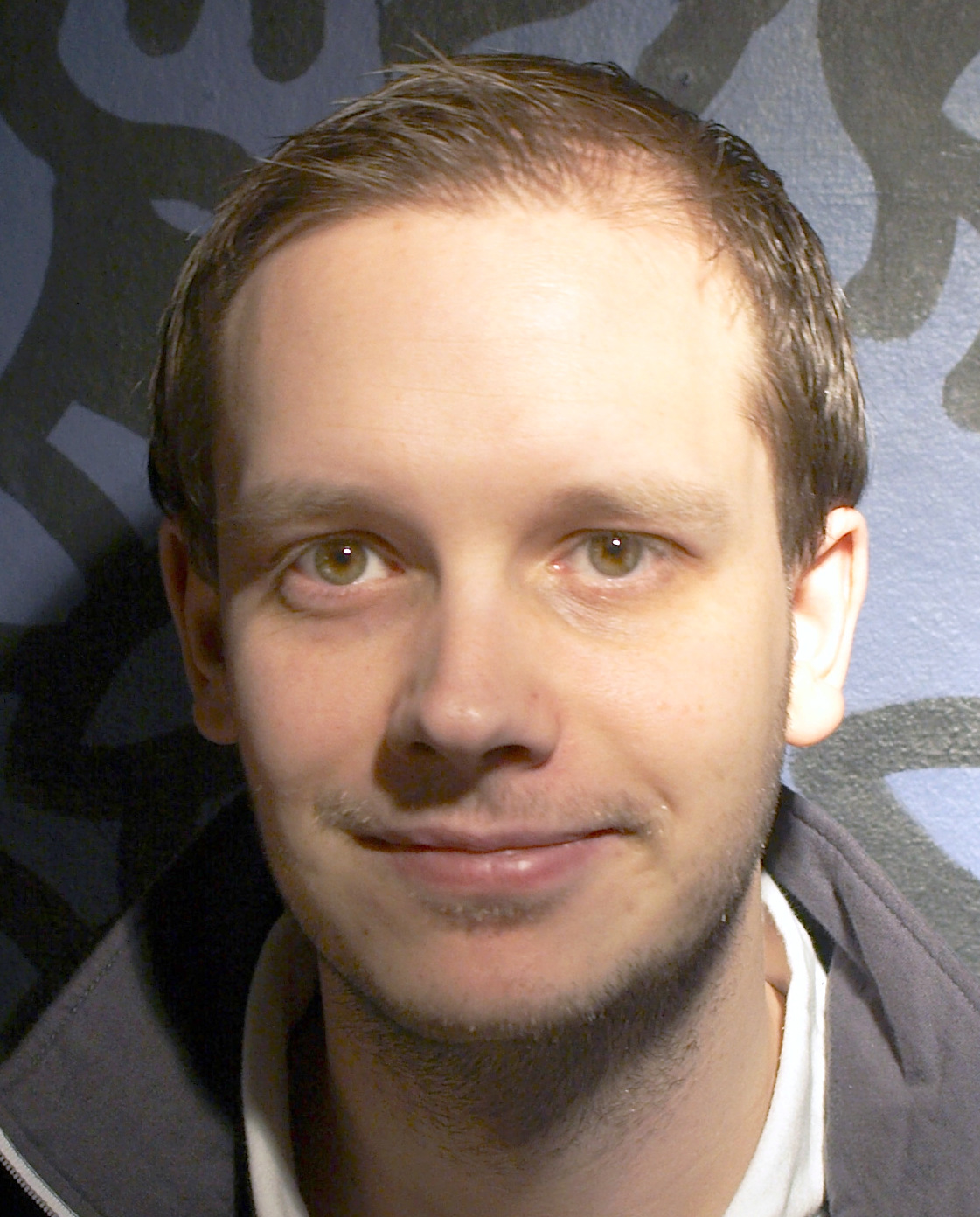
Peter Sunde, Swedish co-founder of The Pirate Bay

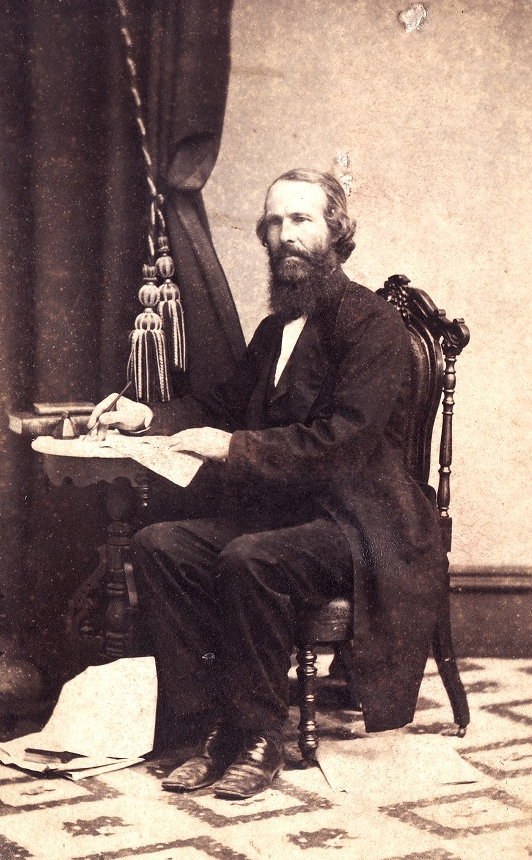
Russell Thacher Trall, American physician

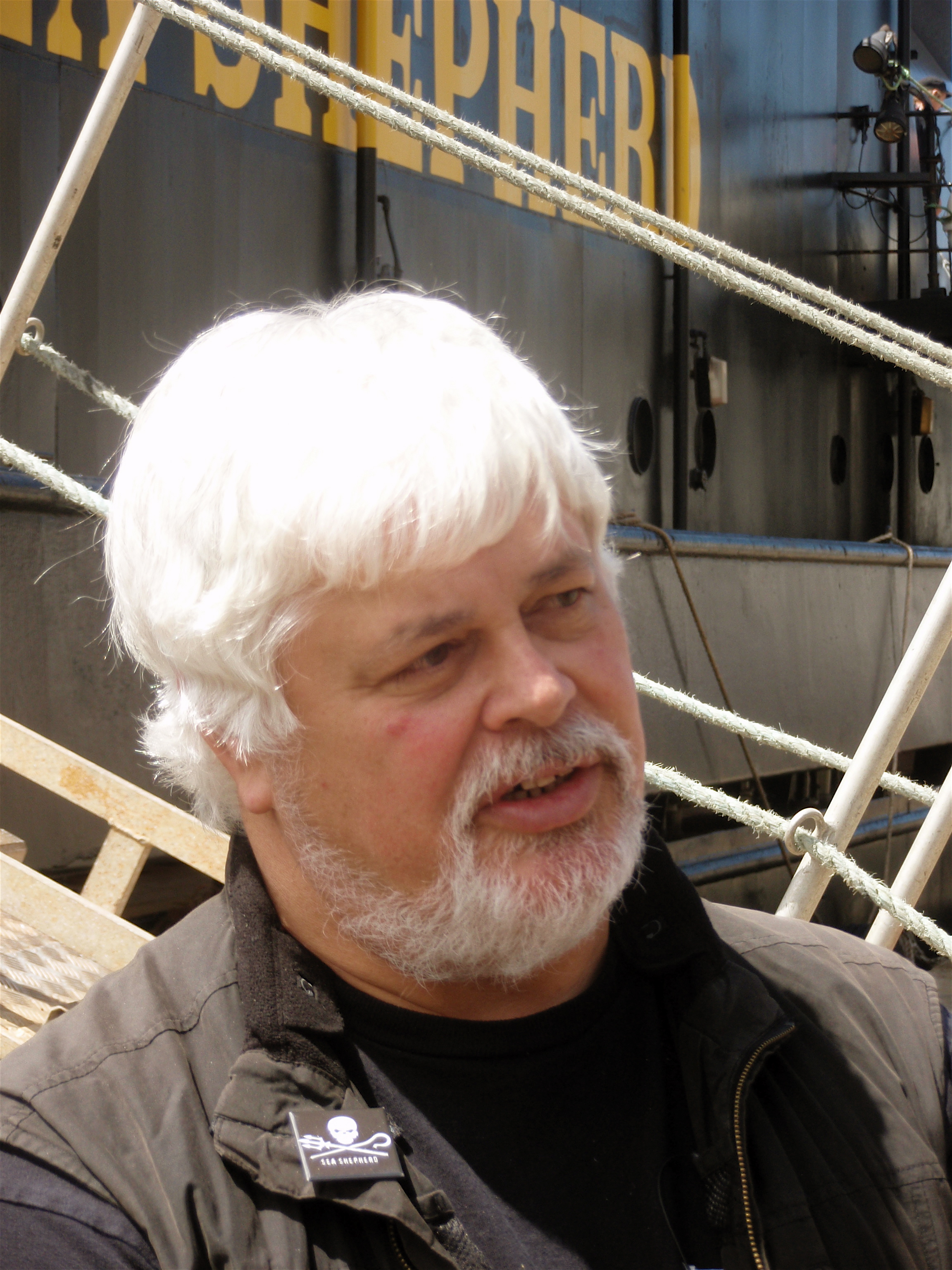
Paul Watson, Canadian president of the Sea Shepherd Conservation Society

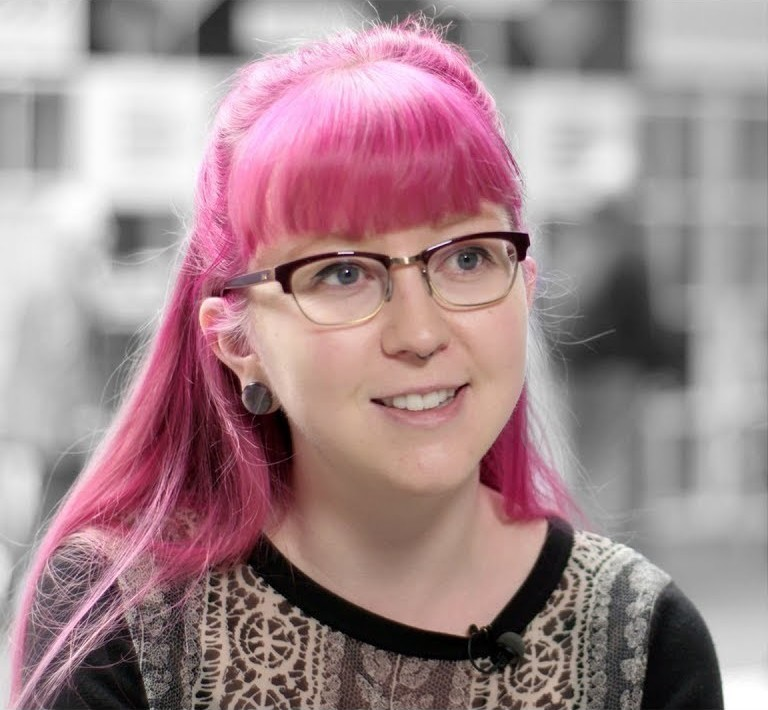
Lisa Winter, engineer, roboticist, and television personality

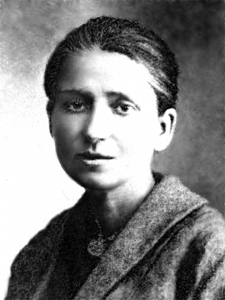
Sophie Zaïkowska, French individualist anarchist

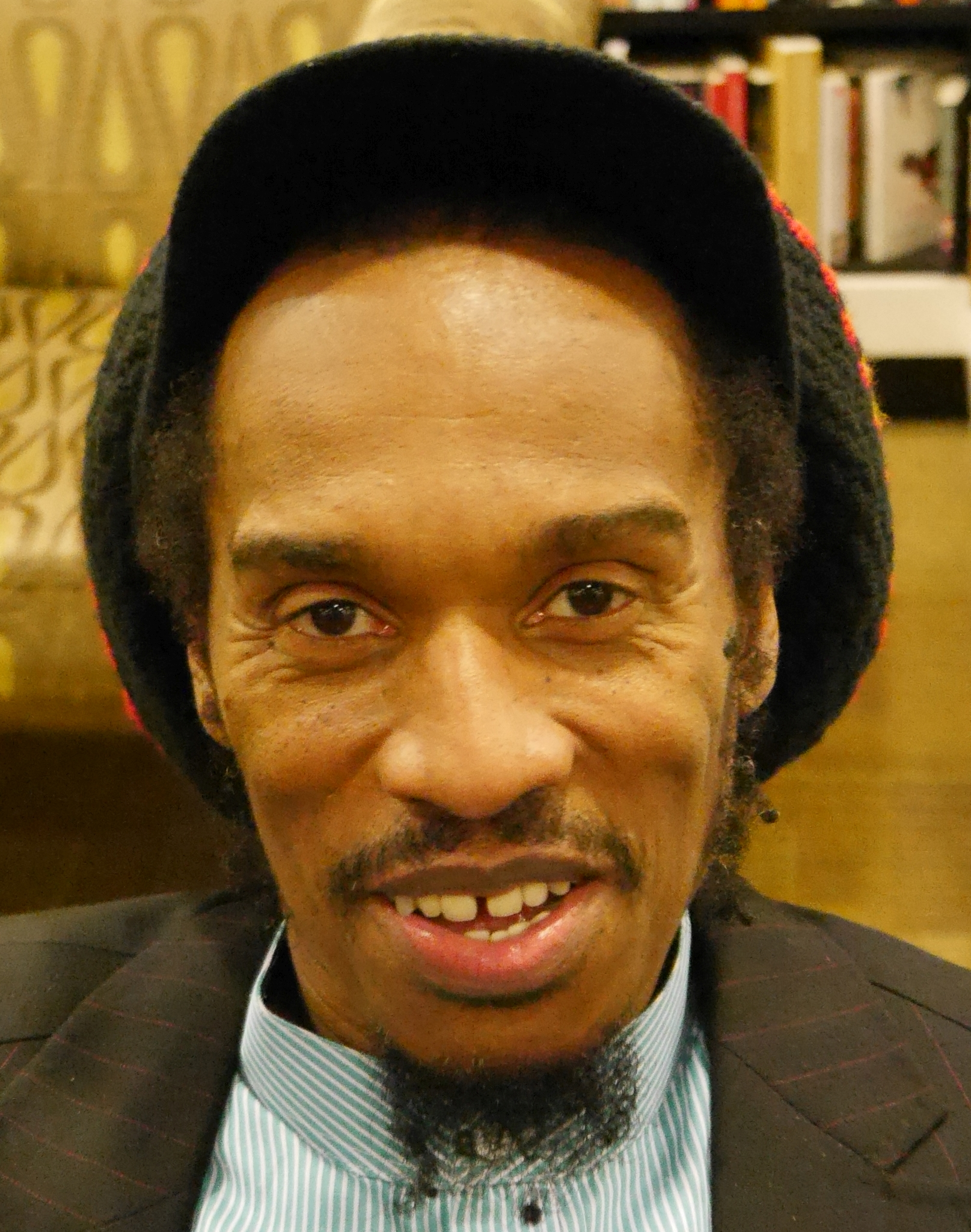
Benjamin Zephaniah, British poet

== See also ==
- List of vegetarians
- List of fictional vegetarian characters
- List of pescetarians
