= Vegan Camp Out =

UK based festival

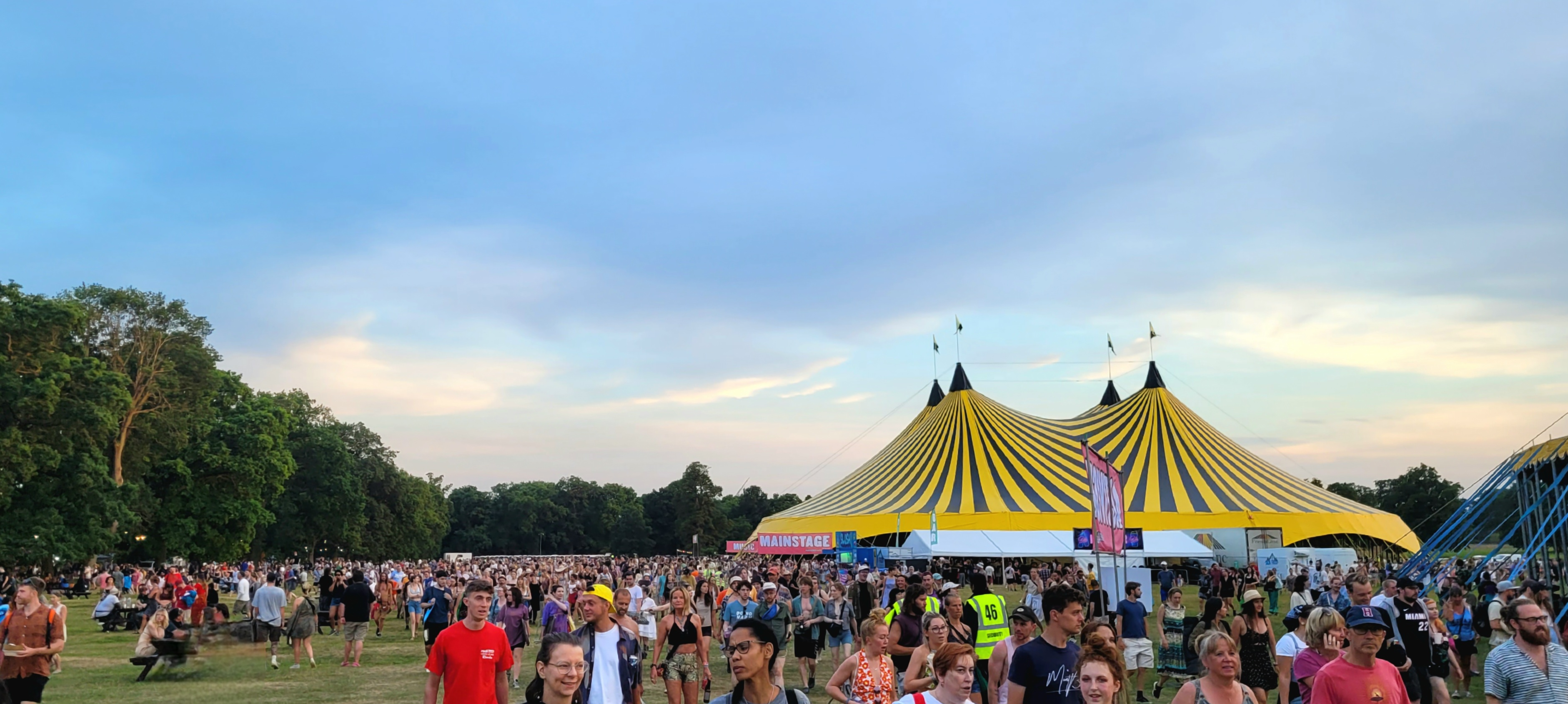
- Location: Various
- Country: UK
- Years active: 2016–present
- Attendance: 12,000 (2022)
- Major events: Music, comedy, activism, educational talks, yoga, food
- Website: vegancampout.co.uk

Vegan Camp Out is an annual camping festival in the UK featuring music, comedy, talks, health & wellbeing activities, and various workshops. Launched in 2016, Vegan Camp Out has been held at various venues in the UK, and an additional festival also ran in Australia in 2023.

The festival focuses on veganism, animal rights and environmentalism. Most performers are publicly vegan, typically including influencers, activists, comedians, and musicians.

== History ==
Founder Jordan Martin co-organised the festival with artist Kate Louise Powell from 2016 to 2019, then vegan influencer Claire Michalski in 2020 and most recently with his sister Ellis Goodridge since 2021.

The festival has received sponsorship from Viva! since 2017. The festival has changed locations multiple times, sometimes following criticism after hosting at venues with links to industries such as farming and hunting.

=== 2016 ===
The festival took place on 16–17 July 2016 at the Riddings Wood Caravan and Camping Park, Derbyshire.

The first Vegan Camp Out event. Around 400 people attended. Entertainment was provided by a DJ, and one food vendor was present.

=== 2017 ===
The festival took place on 7–9 July 2017 at the National Watersports Centre, Nottingham.

Main acts included Earthling Ed, Tim Shieff, Keegan Kuhn, Patrik Baboumian, Joey Carbstrong, James Aspey, Fiona Oakes and Carl Donnelly.

=== 2018 ===
The festival took place on 17–19 August 2018 at the Newark Showground, Nottinghamshire.

Main acts included Simon Amstell, JME, Macka B, Heather Mills, Jona Weinhofen, Neal Barnard, Ingrid Newkirk and Melanie Joy.

=== 2019 ===
The festival took place on 30 August – 1 September 2019 at the Newark Showground, Nottinghamshire. Around 7,500 people attended.

Main acts included Akala, Shikari Sound System, Zak Abel, Earthling Ed, Matt Pritchard, Aspey and Michael Klaper.

=== 2020 (cancelled) ===
Main festival: Originally scheduled: 21–23 August at the Newark Showground, Nottinghamshire.

'Back to Basics': Originally scheduled: 25–26 September – Riddings Wood Caravan and Camping Park, Derbyshire.

Festival organisers initially held off from cancelling the 2020 festival despite the COVID-19 lockdown regulations, due to speculation within the events industry that restrictions might be eased by the time the festival was due to take place. The event was eventually cancelled on 8 June 2020. Following the cancellation of the main event, organisers announced they would be holding a smaller version of the festival, 'Back to Basics', with a lower attendance capacity of 1,000 and without stages for live entertainment. After coming under public scrutiny, the licence application was subsequently withdrawn under pressure after around 50 objections were raised by local residents of the Amber Valley area, including Derbyshire County Council's public health advisor. The council then used emergency powers to block the application from being resubmitted.

=== 2021 ===
The festival took place on 20–22 August 2021 at the Newark Showground, Nottinghamshire.

Main acts included Russell Brand, Chris Packham, Benjamin Zephaniah, BOSH!, Joey Carbstrong, Fiona Oakes and P Money.

=== 2022 ===
The festival took place on 15–18 July 2022 at Stanford Hall, Leicestershire. 12,000 people attended.

Main acts included Evanna Lynch, JME, Simon Amstell, Earthling Ed, Gaz Oakley, Preacher Lawson, Lucy Watson, Macka B and Bimini Bon-Boulash.

The festival took place during a heatwave (reaching 36 °C (97 °F) on the final day) and a lack of water supply became an issue throughout the weekend, for which the organisers apologised on their official Facebook page.

=== 2023 – UK ===
The festival took place on 28–31 July 2023 at Bicester Heritage, Oxfordshire.

Main acts included Romesh Ranganathan, Sam Ryder, Josh Franceschi, Peter Egan, BOSH!, Etherwood, Bob Vylan and Joey Carbstrong.

Some criticism was received after reports of vandalism in the local area – specifically, graffiti with the words 'go vegan' appearing in multiple places around Bicester.

=== 2023 – Australia ===
The festival took place on 24–26 November 2023 in Glenworth Valley (Darkinjung Country), New South Wales.

Main acts included Earthling Ed, Ali Tabrizi, Patrik Baboumian, Nimai Delgado, and Tash Peterson.

=== 2024 ===
The festival took place on 26–29 July 2024 at Bicester Heritage, Oxfordshire. In attendance were a total of 12,000 people.

Main acts included Chris Packham, Kate Nash, Earthling Ed, Simon Amstell, Peter Egan, Gaz Oakley, P Money, Macka B and Michael Greger.

=== 2025 ===
The festival took place on 29 August – 1 September 2025 at Bygrave Woods, Hertfordshire.

Main acts included Sara Pascoe, BOSH!, Josh Franceschi, Kip Andersen, Dale Vince, Matt Pritchard, Etherwood, Alexis Gauthier, Zacchary Bird and Mobius Loop.

=== 2026 ===
The festival took place on 14-17 August 2026 at Walesby Forest, Nottinghamshire.
