= Gatenby (name) =

Gatenby is a surname which originated in Gatenby, North Yorkshire, England. Notable people with the surname include:

- David Gatenby, Australian cricketer
- James Brontë Gatenby (1892–1960), New Zealand zoologist notable for work on structure of cells and Golgi apparatus
- John Gatenby Bolton (1922–1993), British-Australian astronomer
- Peter Gatenby (cricketer) (born 1949), Tasmanian cricketer
- Peter Gatenby (doctor) (1923-2015), son of James Brontë Gatenby; Irish doctor, professor of medicine, medical historian

== See also ==
- Gatenby, a village in North Yorkshire, England
- Gatenby v Gatenby South African court case
