= Testimony of equality =

A testimony of equality is an act, usage, or course of conduct by a member of the Religious Society of Friends (Quakers) tending to assert or promote equality of persons, arising from the Friends' belief that all people are equal in the eyes of God. The word testimony describes the way that Friends testify or bear witness to their beliefs in their everyday life. A testimony is therefore not a belief, but is committed action arising out of Friends' religious experience. Testimony of equality has included Quakers' participating in actions that promote the equality of the sexes and races, as well as other classifications of people.

== General explanation ==
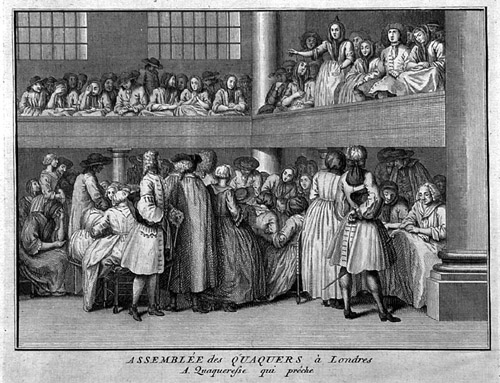
A female Quaker preaches at a meeting in London in the 18th century.

Friends believe that all people are equal in the eyes of God. Since all people embody the same divine spark all people deserve equal treatment. Friends were some of the first to value women as important ministers and to campaign for women's rights; they became leaders in the anti-slavery movement, and were among the first to pioneer humane treatment for individuals with mental disorders, and for prisoners.

Quakers hold a strong sense of spiritual egalitarianism, including a belief in the spiritual equality of the sexes. From the beginning both women and men were granted equal authority to speak in meetings for worship. Margaret Fell-Fox was as vocal and literate as her husband, George Fox, publishing several tracts in the early days of Quakerism. Early Friends argued that inequality between men and women arose from the Fall from the Garden of Eden, but that since Christ has come to redeem our sins, this inequality should no longer stand. For example, George Fox wrote in 1674:

And some men say, "Men must have the Power and superiority over the woman, because God says, 'The man must rule over his wife, and that man is not of woman, but the woman is of the man'" (Gen 3:16). Indeed, after man fell, that command was. But before man fell, there was no such command. For they were both meet-helps. They were both to have dominion over all that God made... And as man and woman are restored again, by Christ, up into the image of God, they both have dominion again in Righteousness and Holiness, and are helps-meet, as before they fell.

Friends' attitude towards egalitarianism is also demonstrated by their refusal to practice "hat honour" (Quakers refused to take their hats off or bow to anyone regardless of title or rank), and their rejection of styles and titles (such as Mr, Mrs, Lord, Dr, etc.), simply calling everyone by their first and last name only (i.e. John Smith rather than Mr Smith or Sir John). This testified to the Friends' understanding that, in the eyes of God, there was no hierarchy based on birth, wealth, or political power—such honours they reserved only for God. This practice was not considered by Friends to be anti-authoritarian in nature, but instead as a rebuke against human pretense and ego.

Today, resistance to "hat honour" does not prevail as it once did: most hat customs are not practiced in contemporary daily life, and the individual Friend is left to decide whether or not to practice "hat honour" as a matter of conscience.

== Equality of the sexes ==
Friends were some of the first to value women as spiritual ministers. Elizabeth Hooton was possibly the first person to be convinced by George Fox and was an outspoken and daring preacher during the earliest days of the movement. Margaret Fell was another early leader of the Friends movement. The first two people who went to what is now the United States to promote the Quaker Faith were Mary Fisher and Ann Austin.

At one time it was common for male and female Quakers to have separate Meetings for Business. This practice was considered to give the women more power and was not meant to demean them. During the 18th century, some Quakers felt that women were not participating fully in Meetings for Business as most women would not "nay-say" their husbands. The solution was to form the two separate Meetings for Business. Many Quaker meeting houses were built with a movable divider down the middle. During Meetings for Worship, the divider was raised. During Business meetings the divider was lowered, creating two rooms. Each gender ran their own separate business meetings. Any issue which required the consent of the whole meeting—building repairs for example—would involve sending an emissary to the other meeting. This practice continued until there was no longer a concern over whether women would "nay-say" their husbands; some very old meetinghouses still have this divider, although it likely is nonmovable.

In addition, many of the leaders in the women's suffrage movement in the United States in the 19th century were drawn from the Quakers, including Susan B. Anthony and Lucretia Mott.

== Racial equality ==
Friends also eventually became leaders in the anti-slavery movement, although a realization of the wrongness of slavery did not develop for almost a century. In the 18th century John Woolman began to stir the conscience of Friends concerning the owning of slaves. Some, such as Benjamin Lay, used immoderate tracts and shock tactics to encourage speedy rejection of both slave ownership and participation in the slave trade.

In 1776, the Philadelphia Yearly Meeting (the most important yearly meeting in the US at the time) prohibited members from owning slaves, and on February 11, 1790, Friends petitioned the U.S. Congress for the abolition of slavery. American Friends were prominent participants in the Underground Railroad, a transportation network for sending escaped slaves to freedom.

== Humane treatment of the mentally ill ==
Quakers were among the first to pioneer humane treatment for the mentally ill, with The Retreat, in York, England, an asylum set up by William Tuke (1732–1822) as a reaction to the harsh nature of 18th century asylum care.

== Humane treatment of prisoners ==
In the 19th Century Elizabeth Fry and her brother, Joseph John Gurney, campaigned for the humane treatment of prisoners. Fry went into prisons herself to provide food, blankets, education, and other assistance to the prisoners. They were able to persuade Members of Parliament to pass reform legislation to improve prison conditions. Fry gave evidence to a House of Commons committee on prison conditions, and her ideas influenced the Gaols Act 1823, which mandated the separation of male and female prisoners, the payment of gaolers, and provision for prison chaplains and doctors. In her testimony she expressed opposition to capital punishment, a view that met significant parliamentary resistance, including from Home Secretary Lord Sidmouth, who publicly accused her of undermining deterrence.

In the 1960s, a Friend, Eric Baker, took part in the founding of Amnesty International, a human rights group primarily focused on the treatment of those in prison and those accused of crimes. It is not directly connected with the Religious Society of Friends but has similar ideals as those derived from the Testimony of Equality.

== Extension to non-human animals ==
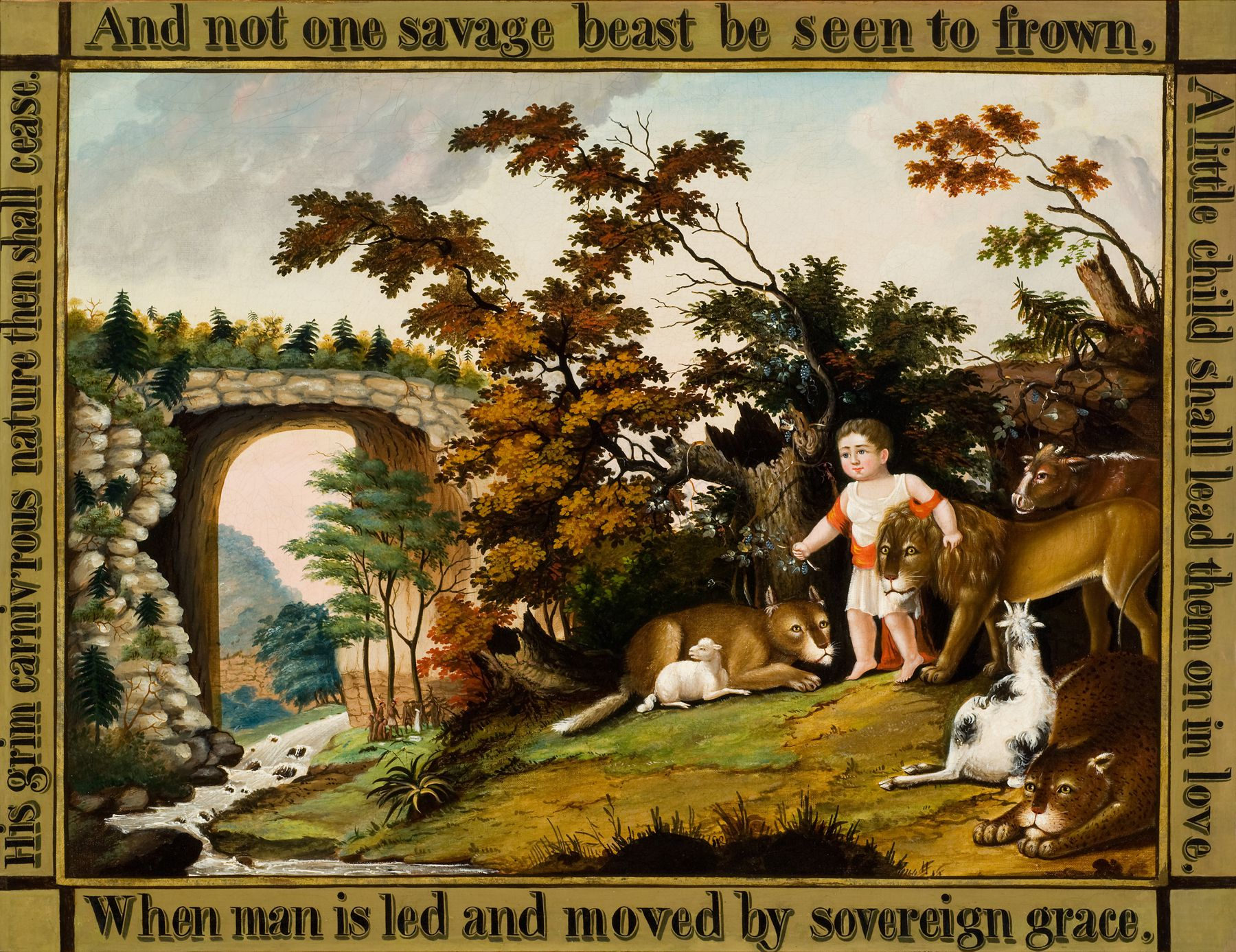
Peaceable Kingdom of the Branch by Quaker artist Edward Hicks (c. 1826). The border text reads: "And not one savage beast be seen to frown, / A little child shall lead them on in love. / When man is led and moved by sovereign grace, / His grim carnivrous [sic] nature then shall cease."

The Testimony of Equality, which historically emphasizes the "divine spark" within every human being, has been extended by various Friends to include non-human animals. This perspective is rooted in the conviction that the "flame of life was kindled by God in all animal and sensitive creatures." Early proponents of this view argued that professing love for God while exercising cruelty toward any living creature was a fundamental spiritual contradiction.

During the 18th century, radical Quaker abolitionists incorporated a concern for animal welfare within their witness for equality. Benjamin Lay practiced a lifestyle described by biographers as "very nearly a vegan" nearly two centuries before the term was coined, refusing to eat flesh or wear garments like wool and leather procured at the expense of animal life. He viewed animals as "fellow creatures" and believed that a revolutionary re-evaluation of all life was necessary to reject the values of the marketplace. Similarly, Anthony Benezet adopted a vegetarian diet, stating he had formed a "league of amity and peace with the animal creation." When invited to eat poultry, Benezet replied, "What, would you have me eat my neighbors?" John Woolman furthered this tradition by emphasizing a tenderness toward all creatures. During his travels in England, Woolman chose to walk rather than ride in stagecoaches to avoid complicity in the overwork and abuse of horses. These figures were significantly influenced by the writings of Thomas Tryon, who described animals as "Fellow Citizens of the World" possessed of natural rights. Tryon argued that all living creatures shared in the divine and that violence toward animals was inseparable from violence toward human beings.

The modern animal welfare movement was profoundly shaped by Quaker author Ruth Harrison. Her 1964 book Animal Machines challenged the rise of intensive agriculture by arguing that commerce does not justify condoned cruelty. Harrison's work shifted the focus from merely avoiding unnecessary suffering to respecting the specific biological needs of animals as individual living entities. Her advocacy contributed directly to the British government's Brambell Report, which codified the Five Freedoms for farm animals, conceptually establishing minimal moral rights for livestock.

The Britain Yearly Meeting's Advices and Queries (No. 42) instructs Friends to "show a loving consideration for all creatures" and to ensure that human power over nature is used "responsibly, with reverence for life." Contemporary Quakers have taken this concern forward through Quaker Concern for Animals (QCA), founded in 1891 as the Friends' Anti-Vivisection Association and renamed in 1978, which continues to raise awareness of animal welfare within the Society of Friends. More recently, Quaker Vegan Witness (QVW), founded in 2019, has continued this tradition by organising vegan witness activities within British Quaker communities and explicitly connecting animal equality to Quaker testimony.

== See also ==
- Humanitarianism
- Quakers
- Quaker views of homosexuality
- Testimony of integrity
- Testimony of peace
- Testimony of simplicity
