= Peter Gatenby =

Peter Gatenby may refer to:

- Peter Gatenby (cricketer) (born 1949), Australian cricketer
- Peter Gatenby (doctor) (1923–2015), Irish former doctor

== See also ==
- Gatenby (name)
