= Brambell =

Brambell is an English language surname.

== List of people with the surname ==
- Francis Brambell (1901–1970), Irish medical scientist
- Iain Brambell (born 1973), Canadian rower
- Michael Brambell, British zoologist
- Wilfrid Brambell (1912–1985), Irish television and film actor and comedian

== See also ==
- Bramble
- Bramble (surname)
- Bramwell (disambiguation)
