= Charles Patterson (author) =

American author and historian (born 1935)

- Born: August 7, 1935 (age 91); New Britain, Connecticut, U.S.
- Education: Kent School
- Alma mater: Amherst College
- Occupation: Author
- Writing career
- Language: English
- Genre: Non-fiction
- Subject: Vegetarianism
- Notable work: Eternal Treblinka: Our Treatment of Animals and the Holocaust
- Notable awards: Carter G. Woodson Book Award

Charles W. Patterson (born August 7, 1935) is an American author, historian, and animal rights advocate, best known for his books, Eternal Treblinka: Our Treatment of Animals and the Holocaust, Anti-Semitism: The Road to the Holocaust and Beyond, Animal Rights, The Civil Rights Movement, and Marian Anderson.

He is an active member of the Authors Guild, PEN, and The National Writers Union. He follows a vegetarian lifestyle, and believes that vegetarianism can reduce violence in humans. In a protest against Columbia University's animal cruelty, Patterson returned his doctorate to the president of the university. He believed that innocent lives had greater importance than a piece of paper. Patterson is active in the Vegetarian Community, and was a guest speaker at the 2015 Veggie Pride Parade in New York City. His greatest fantasy is for all slaughterhouses to end their killing. He currently lives on the Upper West side of Manhattan.

== Early life and career ==
Charles Patterson grew up in New Britain, Connecticut. He was born in New Britain General hospital. Patterson did not know his father due to his early passing in war. His father fought against the Nazis in Europe, which led Patterson to his interest in the topics of World War 2 and The Holocaust. He has been a teacher at colleges, elementary schools, and for adult education classes. Patterson is proficient in teaching various subject such as English, social studies, and history. He was a professor at Adelphi University, New School University, Hunter College, and the Metropolitan College. He was a reviewer for The International Society of Yad Vashem's Publication Martyrdom and Resistance. He worked for the publication for 17 years to help preserve the stories of Holocaust Survivors and their families. He was featured in the book Who Stole My Religion? By Richard Schwartz. The story correlated nature with Judaism faith. He was invited to write The Oxford 50th Anniversary Book of The United Nations. Patterson's most recent book is In Dante's Footsteps: My Journey to Hell (a modern update of Dante's Inferno).

== Education ==
He studied at the Kent School, Kent, Connecticut in the class of 1954. Patterson was educated at Amherst College from where he graduated in 1958, and Columbia University, from where he received an MA in English Literature and a PhD in Religion. He later studied at the Yad Vashem Institute for Holocaust Education in Jerusalem.

== Achievements ==
The National Council for the Social Studies awarded him the Carter G. Woodson Book Award in 1989. He received the secondary level award for his children's story, Marian Anderson. Patterson's Eternal Treblinka: Our Treatment of Animals and the Holocaust was featured in the publication The Animal's Agenda in 2002. The article was the cover story of the March/April issue and was titled The Holocaust and Animal Exploitation. He was honored with an Animal Rights Writing award in 1995 for his story Animal Rights. The award was presented to him by the International Society for Animal Rights. ' He was featured in People for The Ethical Treatment of Animal's campaign titled Holocaust on Your Plate. PETA quoted Patterson's comparison of animal slaughterhouses to gas chambers of the Holocaust.

== Eternal Treblinka ==
Political Affairs called Eternal Treblinka, "a wonderful book about terrible subjects". JVNA called it "very well researched ... written with great sensitivity and compassion".

== Criticism ==
Patterson's positions have been criticized by groups, namely Jewish anti-defamation and Holocaust memorial organizations. Some claim that Patterson's comparisons between slaughterhouses and the Holocaust trivialize the experience of Holocaust victims and survivors. Dr. Manfred Gerstenfeld writes on Holocaust comparisons such as Patterson's that, "In essence, the animal rights supporters who trivialize the Holocaust humanize animals to develop their flawed and perverse discourse."

Other opposition to Patterson's claims argue that the Holocaust and factory-farming are predicated upon different historical and sociological frameworks. Jewish animal rights activist Roberta Kalechofsky writes that although there are aesthetic similarities between the treatment of factory-farmed animals and Jews in the Holocaust, "The agony of animals arises from different causes from those of the Holocaust. Human beings do not hate animals. They do not eat them because they hate them… Human beings have no ideological or theological conflict with animals." The Anti-Defamation League contests the validity of some of Patterson's historical claims, writing that, "his treatment of some of [Eternal Treblinka]'s themes moves from the offensive and ridiculous to the absurd. Apparently compelled to demonstrate that Hitler could not have been a vegetarian (nor have liked them), Patterson writes: "Hitler discovered that when he reduced his meat intake, he did not sweat as much, and there were fewer stains in his underwear. He also became convinced that eating vegetables improved the odors of his flatulence, a condition that distressed him terribly and caused him much embarrassment….Nonetheless, Hitler never gave up his favorite meat dishes, especially Bavarian sausages, liver dumplings, and stuffed and roasted game…." "Whatever his dietary preferences, Hitler showed little sympathy for the vegetarian cause in Germany. When he came to power in 1933, he banned all the vegetarian societies in Germany….Nazi persecution forced German vegetarians, a tiny minority in a nation of carnivores, either to flee the country or go underground."

Other criticisms arise from Patterson's interpretation of Abrahamic tradition as catalyzing animal abuses. Jewish Animal Rights author Richard H. Schwartz writes, "Patterson states that some historians and environmentalists blame the Genesis verse, in which God grants people dominion over the earth, for western civilization's destruction and despoliation of the environment. By failing to mention traditional Jewish interpretations of this verse that define dominion as responsible stewardship rather than as domination, he may leave the mistaken impression that the exploitation of animals and the environment is religiously sanctioned."

== Related readings ==
Charles Patterson's "Eternal Treblinka" discusses the similarities between society's treatment of animals and the Holocaust. Here are some other readings that do the same.

- "Speciesism as a Precondition to Justice" by Michael Barilan- Barilan discusses how the use of certain members of a community for the benefit of others is justified by moral sociability, and not moral considerability. The idea explored here is that speciesism occurs due to differences in sociability within a group, and not due to consideration of individual rights among species. This idea is compared to Nazi racism because this institution gave praise to the strong and condemned the weak, humans and animals alike.
- "Can the Treatment of Animals Be Compared to the Holocaust?" by David Sztybel- Sztybel gives a very detailed comparison of animal treatment and the Holocaust, through the use of a thirty-nine-point comparison. He counters the protest that these comparisons should not be made by questioning whether or not animal liberationists have the right to express their thoughts and beliefs. The four points considered are whether or not a comparison between animal treatment and the Holocaust is offensive, whether this comparison trivializes the happenings of the Holocaust, if significant differences are overlooked through comparison, and the possibility that there is an affinity between animal liberationists and Nazis. Sztybel argues that arguments against him are insufficient in proving those four points, and this actually further supports claims of poor animal treatment happening presently.
- "Human Rights and Animal Rights: Differences Matter" by Tine Stein- This critique of the book "Zoopolis" questions in what ways animals and humans differ, and if these differences have a moral significance. Stein also discusses how human discrimination is different than the continual mistreatment of animals in society. This critique finally argues that animals in certain living spaces should not be divided into categories based on their proximity and association with humans.
- "Animals in the Third Reich: Pets, Scapegoats, and the Holocaust" by Boria Sax- This reading explores the role emotion plays in the divide between humans and animals, and how the place of certain species in nature relates to the rise of socialism in society. Sax explains how his concern for animal treatment and emotion is not a way of trivializing what happened to humans during the holocaust. Additionally, he looks into certain species' roles in human culture, the psychology of animals, biologically based ideologies, and methods of animal protection that were once implemented by the Nazis. Finally, Sax discusses the Nazi and overall German views of animal slaughter and death, and the role this may have played in the Holocaust.

== Publications ==
- Anti-Semitism: The Road to the Holocaust and Beyond, Walker & Co, first edition, 1982. ISBN 978-0-80276-470-6
- The Civil Rights Movement (Social Reform Movements), Facts on File, 1995. ISBN 978-0-81602-968-6
- The Oxford 50th Anniversary Book of the United Nations, Oxford University Press, 1995. ISBN 978-0-19508-280-7
- Animal Rights, Backinprint.com, 2000. ISBN 978-0-59509-494-3
- Hafiz Al-Asad of Syria, iUniverse, 2000. ISBN 978-0-59500-412-6
- Marian Anderson, iUniverse, 2000. ISBN 978-0-59509-493-6
- Thomas Jefferson, iUniverse, 2000. ISBN 978-0-59509-589-6
- Eternal Treblinka: Our Treatment of the Animals and the Holocaust, Lantern Books, first edition, 2002. ISBN 978-1-930-05199-7
- From Buchenwald to Carnegie Hall (co-author with Marian Filar), University Press of Mississippi, first edition, 2002. ISBN 978-1-57806-419-9
- In Dante's Footsteps: My Journey to Hell, Christian Faith Publishing, first edition, 2018. ISBN 978-1-64299-261-8

== See also ==
- Animal–industrial complex
- Holocaust analogy in animal rights
