= Five freedoms =

Five freedoms or Five Freedoms may refer to:

- Five Freedoms model, a framework for assessing animal welfare
- Five freedoms of air transport, a set of commercial aviation rights
- Five Freedoms Forum, a group of anti-apartheid organizations
- Five freedoms of the First Amendment to the United States Constitution
- Five freedoms of the Free Quakers religion

== See also ==
- Five Domains model
