= Gary Yourofsky =

American animal rights activist (born 1970)

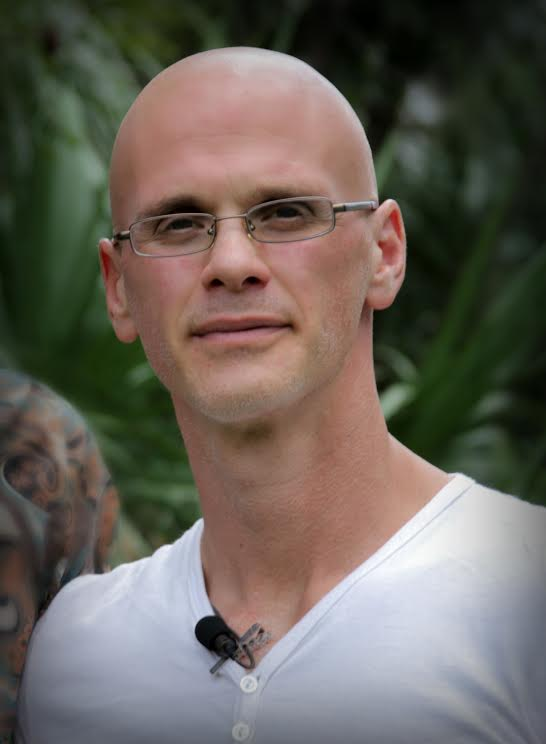
- Yourofsky in 2013
- Born: August 19, 1970 (age 55); Detroit, Michigan, U.S.
- Occupations: Lecturer, activist
- Known for: Speeches promoting animals rights
- Website: www.adaptt.org

Gary Yourofsky (/jʊəˈrɒfski/; born August 19, 1970) is an American animal rights activist, lecturer, and educator. He has had a major influence on contemporary veganism through his classroom lectures. The most notable speech Yourofsky gave, at Georgia Institute of Technology, is titled “The Most Important Speech You Will Ever Hear”, has received millions of views online, and is still shared in contemporary vegan activism.

Yourofsky was sponsored by People for the Ethical Treatment of Animals (PETA) between 2002 and 2005, and has given many public lectures promoting veganism. In 2010, Yourofsky's popularity quickly accelerated around the world (especially in Israel) following the publication of a YouTube video of him giving a speech at the Georgia Institute of Technology. The video garnered millions of views and has been translated into tens of different languages. Yourofsky has been admired and criticized for his views that are often alleged to be extreme. He was arrested 13 times between 1997 and 2001 and spent 77 days in a Canadian maximum security prison in 1999 after raiding a fur farm in Canada and releasing 1,542 minks in 1997. He has been permanently banned from entering Canada and the United Kingdom.

On March 30, 2017, Yourofsky announced the end of his activist life on his Facebook page, stating: "My tank is completely empty, so I will no longer be online or active in any capacity besides helping students with animal rights projects and answering emails from people who are beginning their vegan journeys."

On May 19, 2025, Yourofsky announced via his YouTube channel that he would be joining Anonymous for the Voiceless in Cologne, Germany to be a part of an activism workshop and engage in outreach. Since then, Yourofsky has made several podcast appearances announcing that he is returning to activism after a 10 year hiatus.

== Personal life ==
Yourofsky was born into a Jewish family in Detroit, Michigan, United States. He grew up in Oak Park. Yourofsky has "a giant tattoo of himself, wearing a mask and holding a rabbit, covering most of his right forearm."

In a 2013 interview, Yourofsky described himself as having been a "troublemaker" in high school. He recalled that he did not sign up for any math classes during the entire four years, in deliberate defiance of the requirements; at the end of his senior year he challenged the principal to hold him back, but she approved his graduation instead. He holds a B.A. in journalism from Oakland University and a radio broadcasting degree from Specs Howard School of Media Arts.

== Animal rights advocacy ==
=== 1996–2001: early years as an activist ===
In 1996, Yourofsky founded Animals Deserve Absolute Protection Today and Tomorrow (ADAPTT), a vegan organization opposed to any usage of animals. By 2001, the organization had around 2,200 members.

On March 30, 1997, Yourofsky, alongside 4 other members of the Animal Liberation Front (ALF), raided a fur farm in Blenheim, Ontario, Canada, and released 1,542 mink. The raid reportedly caused damage estimated at C$500,000 to the farm. Yourofsky was arrested, tried, and sentenced to six months in a Canadian maximum-security prison in 1999 at Elgin-Middlesex Detention Centre. Of the sentence, Yourofsky served 77 days. The experience affected Yourofsky, who said "[he] was no more than an animal in the zoo. It wasn't pleasant", and that it has reinforced "[his] empathy and understanding of what these animals go through".

In the fall of 2000, Yourofsky received $10,000 from PETA to fund the broadcasting of a commercial against "the animal slavery enterprise known as the circus". The commercial was broadcast 69 times on a local television channel.

In 2001, Yourofsky began facing financial problems, such as credit card debt of US$30000, that curtailed his activism for three months of 2001.

=== 2002–2005: PETA sponsorship ===
In early 2002, Yourofsky resigned as president of ADAPTT, due to financial troubles. A day after sending his resignation letter, he received a telephone call from Ingrid Newkirk, president of PETA, who offered him a job. Employment negotiations between the two concluded on May 20, 2002, with Yourofsky being made the organization's official national lecturer.

In 2002, Yourofsky told a reporter that he would "unequivocally support" the death of medical researchers in ALF-related arson fires.

In 2003, a Yourofsky lecture at East Tennessee State University was canceled as a result of an altercation. A faculty member had placed a stack of pamphlets in support of animal testing on a cart outside the lecture room. After Yourofsky saw the pamphlets, heated words were exchanged. Yourofsky grabbed the cart and propelled it, causing the pamphlets to scatter across the floor. The lecture was canceled and Yourofsky left the building.

=== 2005–present: leaving PETA and continued activism ===
Yourofsky was invited to give a talk on "Ethical Veganism" to a class at University of Southern Indiana on April 2, 2007. The university handbook contained a provision that outside speakers must "not advocate violation of any federal or state law", and a professor at the university presented material from Yourofsky's website that he found to be infringing that policy to the university provost, resulting in the cancellation of Yourofsky's talk. After objections from free speech advocates at the school, the policy was revised and Yourofsky gave his talk.

Part of Yourofsky's well-known speech on veganism was featured in the 2012 anti-speciesism movie, The Superior Human?

A question and answer session after one of Yourofsky's speeches in mid-2010

Yourofsky visited Israel in September 2012 and was interviewed by Israeli television Channel 2. Lectures scheduled for Yourofsky in public schools were canceled by the Israeli Ministry of Education. Nobel Prize laureate J.M. Coetzee commented, "Children are naturally sensitive. They can easily be shocked and disturbed by spectacles of gross cruelty. It is therefore understandable that education authorities in Israel should be reluctant to allow animal advocates like Mr Yourofsky access to the classroom. On the other hand, there is an argument to be made that the treatment of animals by the food industry is so excessively heartless, and such an affront to natural justice, that we who by our silence tacitly consent to these outrages deserve to be shocked out of our sleep. In the long run, Mr Yourofsky may well be doing us a larger moral service by confronting us, including the most sensitive of us, by the spectacle of the crimes we participate in."

=== Controversies ===
In a 2005 interview, Yourofsky criticized the Humane Society of the United States, the strategies used by PETA, and its president, Ingrid Newkirk. Yourofsky has been criticized for using terms such as "concentration camps," "concentration camp trucks," and "Holocaust" in comparison to the animal agriculture industry. Yourofsky has been banned from entering Canada and Britain as a result of his activism.

== See also ==
- James Aspey
- Joey Carbstrong
- List of vegans
- List of animal rights activists
