= Brimble =

Brimble is a surname. Notable people with the surname include:

- Allister Brimble (born 1970), British composer
- L. J. F. Brimble (1904–1965), English botanist and writer
- Margaret Brimble (born 1961), New Zealand chemist
- Nick Brimble (born 1944), English actor
- Ted Brimble (1910–1968), New Zealand rugby league player
- Walter Brimble (1911–1990), New Zealand rugby league player
- Wilfred Brimble (1913–1999), American rugby league player

== See also ==
- Bramble (disambiguation)
- Brimble Pit and Cross Swallet Basins
- Death of Dianne Brimble
