= FVE =

FVE may refer to:

- Federation of Veterinarians of Europe, a non-profit umbrella organisation of veterinary organisations from 38 European countries
- Northern Aroostook Regional Airport, Aroostook County, Maine, United States; by FAA LID code
- Fluid volume excess, the medical condition where there is too much fluid in the blood
