= Holocaust on your Plate =

Animal rights exhibition

The Holocaust on your Plate was an exhibition mounted by People for the Ethical Treatment of Animals (PETA) in 2003. It was funded by an anonymous Jewish philanthropist, and consisted of eight 60-square-foot panels, each with a juxtaposition of images of the Holocaust with images of factory farming. Photographs of concentration camp inmates in wooden bunks were shown next to photographs of battery chickens, and piled bodies of Holocaust victims next to a pile of pig carcasses. Captions alleged that "like the Jews murdered in concentration camps, animals are terrorized when they are housed in huge filthy warehouses and rounded up for shipment to slaughter. The leather sofa and handbag are the moral equivalent of the lampshades made from the skins of people killed in the death camps."

Abraham Foxman of the Anti-Defamation League (ADL) said the exhibition was "outrageous, offensive and takes chutzpah to new heights ... [T]he effort by PETA to compare the deliberate systematic murder of millions of Jews to the issue of animal rights is abhorrent." The ADL denounced the campaign The ADL urged animal rights groups to avoid Holocaust comparisons, saying that "the issue should stand on its own merits, rather than rely on inappropriate comparisons that only serve to trivialize the suffering of the six million Jews and other groups who died at the hands of the Nazis".

PETA defended the campaign. The project's website cited Jewish Nobel laureate Isaac Bashevis Singer, who wrote of animals: "In relation to them, all people are Nazis; for the animals it is an eternal Treblinka." Singer's words were actually spoken by a character in his novel Enemies, A Love Story. The exhibition was supported by Singer's grandson, Stephen R. Dujack, when it traveled to New York. The creator of the campaign, Matt Prescott, who is Jewish and lost several relatives in the Holocaust, told The Guardian: "The very same mindset that made the Holocaust possible – that we can do anything we want to those we decide are 'different or inferior' – is what allows us to commit atrocities against animals every single day ... The fact is, all animals feel pain, fear and loneliness. We're asking people to recognise that what Jews and others went through in the Holocaust is what animals go through every day in factory farms."

PETA has used Holocaust imagery before. A television public service announcement titled "They Came for Us at Night", which aired on U.S. cable networks and in Warsaw, Poland in July 2003, "showed the outside world through the slats of a boxcar and is narrated by a man (with an accent) who describes the plight of being transported with no food and water", according to the ADL, and drew an analogy between the plight of pigs and cows being transported to their deaths in cattle cars with Jews and other Nazi persecuted groups in the same situation during the Holocaust. Newkirk was quoted as saying "Six million Jews died in concentration camps, but six billion broiler chickens will die this year in slaughterhouses."

In 2004 following a complaint by Paul Spiegel and the Central Council of Jews in Germany, court in Germany ordered PETA to halt the campaign. The group later issued an apology for the campaign.

== See also ==
- Eternal Treblinka
- Holocaust analogy in animal rights
- Veganism
