= Gaz Oakley =

British vegan chef and cookbook author from Cardiff, Wales

Gaz Oakley, formerly known as the Avant-Garde Vegan, is a chef and cookbook author from Cardiff, Wales. He was described in the Daily Telegraph as "a star of the meat-free world", whose "recipes have gained the respect of herbivores and carnivores alike". In 2026, Oakley added animal source foods to his diet, no longer fitting the vegan label.

== Career ==
Oakley, who grew up in Cardiff, was taught to cook as a child by his father, and got his first job in a kitchen aged 15. He left school at 16 to work in the kitchen full-time. For several years, he worked in hotel and restaurant kitchens in Cardiff. He then switched careers to work in a builder's yard, becoming a sales manager. The new job offered him more free time, and he took up fitness and strength training activities. It was through this that he first started to move towards veganism. After hearing a radio interview with the vegan musician Jme, Oakley looked up videos of Gary Yourofsky, and it was these that encouraged him to switch to a vegan lifestyle. After success encouraging friends and family to transition to veganism, he decided to use his cookery experience as a form of activism. He launched the @avantgardevegan Instagram page in February 2016, and, later that year, gave up his sales job to focus full-time on activism and cookery. The Avant-Garde Vegan YouTube channel was launched at the end of the year. Oakley told The Sunday Times that the COVID-19 pandemic resulted in his subscriber numbers hitting one million.

Oakley went on to write several vegan cookbooks, as well as partner with The Vurger Co. and Wagamama to create vegan foods. In 2023, VegNews listed Oakley as one of the "37 Creative Chefs Crafting the Future of Vegan Food" in 2023, and also named Vegan 100 as one of the "Top 100 Vegan Cookbooks of All Time" in 2024.

In May 2026, Oakley broke away from the vegan label and stated that he plans to add invasive species such as "crayfish or venison or pigeon" to his diet. He stated that if he had been aware of alternative movements such as localism and sustainable living in the past he would not have become vegan. Oakley also said he rejects the plant-based label as he uses honey.

== Books ==
- Vegan 100 (Quadrille Publishing, 2018)
- Vegan Christmas (Quadrille Publishing, 2018)
- Plants Only Kitchen (Quadrille Publishing, 2020)
- Plants Only Holidays (Quadrille Publishing, 2024)
- Plant to Plate (Hardie Grant London Ltd., 2025)
