= Eternal Treblinka =

2001 non-fiction book by Charles Patterson

Eternal Treblinka: Our Treatment of Animals and the Holocaust
- Author: Charles Patterson
- Language: English
- Publication date: 2001

Eternal Treblinka: Our Treatment of Animals and the Holocaust is a non-fiction book by the American author Charles Patterson, first published in December 2001.

== Editions ==
Eternal Treblinka has been translated into French, German, Spanish, Italian, Hebrew, Polish, Czech, Serbian, Croatian, Slovenian, Russian, Japanese, and Korean.

== See also ==
- Animal–industrial complex
- Holocaust analogy in animal rights
