= Five Domains model =

Model for assessing animal welfare

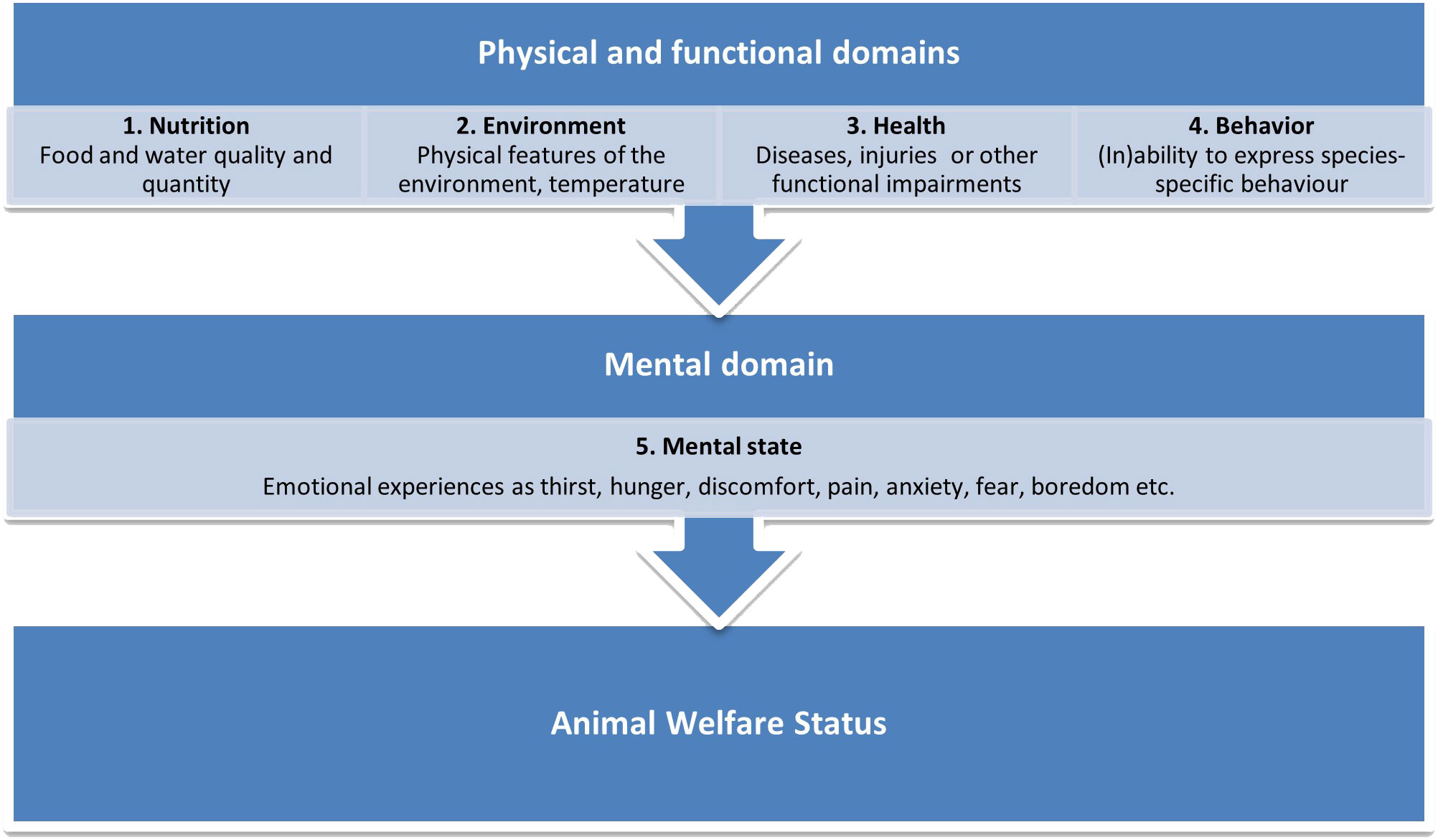
Diagram of the Five Domains model of animal welfare.

The Five Domains model, sometimes given as Five Domains, is a model for assessing animal welfare. The Five Domains covered by the model are nutrition, environment, health, behaviour, and mental state. The first four domains (the physical domains) directly influence the fifth (the mental domain) which in turn directly impacts the welfare state of the animal. The Five Domains model was developed by David Mellor and Christopher Reid in response to perceived deficiencies with the Five Freedoms model and has since been adopted by a number of leading animal welfare organisations and animal welfare scientists.

== Background ==
The Five Freedoms model was first introduced by the UK Farm Animal Welfare Council in a 1979 press statement in response to the Brambell Report, a 1965 UK Government report on livestock husbandry. The Five Freedoms were defined as the freedom from hunger or thirst, the freedom from discomfort, the freedom from pain, injury, and disease, the freedom to express natural behaviour, and the freedom from fear and distress. This model was widely adopted and used to inform animal welfare law and welfare assurance schemes.

== History ==
In 1994, Mellor and Reid proposed that animal welfare is better modelled through the wider measurement of the animal's situation, as opposed to simply analysing the presence or lack thereof of hunger, fear, pain, discomfort, and natural behaviours. The negative experiences described in the Five Freedoms are inherently unavoidable and are natural biological responses to stimuli, and the minimisation or elimination of these experiences does not inherently prove good welfare. It is more important when promoting animal welfare to attempt to elicit positive responses such as comfort and pleasure in animals. Allowing animals to still experience a tolerable level of negative affects such as hunger ensures they continue to exhibit rewarding natural behaviours such as foraging.

The Five Domains model consists of the domains of nutrition (such as the presence and quality of food and water), environment (the animal's habitat and surroundings), health (disease, injury, and other impairments such as age), behaviour (the animal's ability to express natural, specific behaviours such as scent-marking or foraging), and mental state (the emotional experience of the animal). The initial four domains are measured and this information is used to determine the overall mental state of the animal, which in turn is used to measure its overall welfare The model is designed to help ensure that animals have a "life worth living", and are not simply having their basic survival needs met.

The Five Domains model is used to evaluate the welfare of animals in a number of situations, such as zoos, farms, in research, and in animal shelters. The model has further been used in the development of measurements of an animal's quality of life, which is especially useful when making decisions around euthanasia. The Five Domains model is supported by numerous major animal welfare organisations such as the RSPCA and World Animal Protection. In zoos and aquaria the model has been used to measure the overall welfare of capture wildlife and to improve their conditions, and is recommended by the World Association of Zoos and Aquariums to be used in assessing welfare. It has been used to assess the welfare impacts of various forms of pest control in wild animals, and for assessing suffering in animal cruelty investigations in companion animals.
