= Gatenby =

Village and civil parish in North Yorkshire, England

Coordinates: 54.28515°N 1.50112°W

- Location within North Yorkshire
- Population: 40
- OS grid reference: SE324878
- Civil parish: Gatenby
- Unitary authority: North Yorkshire
- Ceremonial county: North Yorkshire
- Region: Yorkshire and the Humber
- Country: England
- Sovereign state: United Kingdom
- Post town: NORTHALLERTON
- Postcode district: DL7
- Police: North Yorkshire
- Fire: North Yorkshire
- Ambulance: Yorkshire

Gatenby is a secluded village and civil parish in North Yorkshire, England. It is situated about two miles east of the A1(M) road, near to the River Swale. Nearby is RAF Leeming.

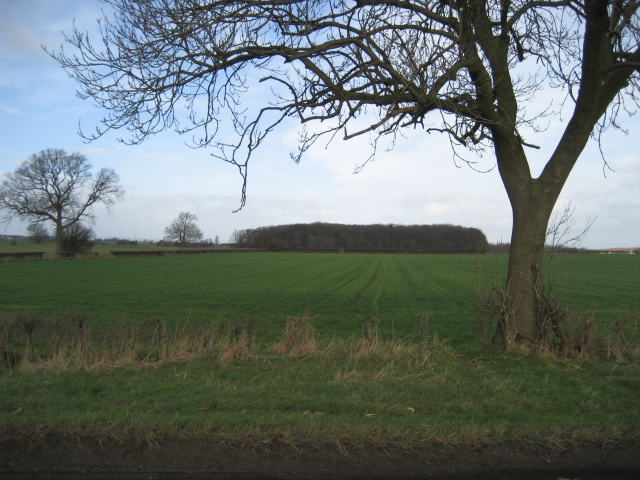
Looking north to Gatenby Wood with the village beyond

The population of the parish was estimated at 40 in 2010. At the 2011 Census the population remained less than 100. Details are included in the civil parish of Exelby, Leeming and Londonderry.

From 1974 to 2023 it was part of the Hambleton District, it is now administered by the unitary North Yorkshire Council.

The place name is found in the Domesday Book as Ghetenesbi, the meaning is unclear, one interpretation is "goat's tongue ridge farm", a farm situated on a narrow ridge.

From the place name, there is a derivative English surname, see Gatenby (name).
