= Ed Winters =

British animal rights activist, filmmaker and lecturer

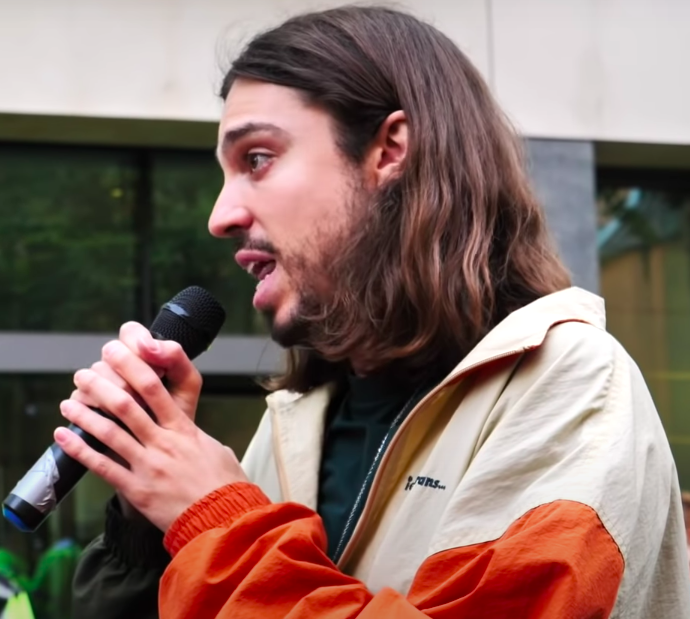
- Born: York, England
- Other name: Earthling Ed
- Education: University of Westminster, York College
- Years active: 2016–present
- Known for: Animal rights advocacy and viral speeches
- Movement: Animal rights and veganism
- Website: www.earthlinged.org

Ed Winters, also known online as Earthling Ed, is an English animal rights activist, author, orator, filmmaker, lecturer and vegan educator. As an activist of veganism, he authored the books This Is Vegan Propaganda: (And Other Lies the Meat Industry Tells You) (2022), and How to Argue With a Meat Eater (And Win Every Time) (2023) and How to Go (and Stay) Vegan (2025).

== Early life and education ==
Winters was born in York. He graduated with a Bachelor of Arts (BA) in Film and Television Production from the University of Westminster.

Winters turned vegetarian on 14 May 2014 after coming across a news article about a truck, which was carrying chickens, crashing near Manchester. Upon reading that many of the birds had died, and watching the documentary Earthlings he decided to become vegan in March 2015.

== Animal rights advocacy ==
Winters started his YouTube channel in 2016, alongside co-founding the animal rights organisation Surge. His Earthling Ed channel brought him to fame with videos of him having friendly talks about veganism with non-vegan passers-by.

He has worked as a Media and Design Fellow at Harvard University in 2022, and has frequently presented at Harvard as a guest lecturer.

Winters has given speeches in one-third of British universities and across college campuses in America. Winters has appeared on live television such as on This Morning debating the ethical and environmental arguments for veganism.

In September 2018, he opened a non-profit vegan restaurant in London called Unity Diner. The restaurant helps to fund an animal sanctuary in the Midlands which Winters co-founded. Winters was also one of the guests at the 2018 Montreal Vegan Festival.

In early 2019 he gave two TEDx talks. That same year, he toured the United States and gave vegan lectures at Cornell, Harvard, Brown, Columbia, Yale, and Rutgers Universities.

After Priestlands School in Lymington, Hampshire presented its students with piglets to teach them how to "fatten up pigs for slaughter", and dismissed concerns, Winters launched a campaign which reached 37,000 signatures within days of its launch.

In March 2020, during the COVID-19 pandemic, Winters posted an image on his Instagram account stating that "COVID-19 started because we eat animals" and "would not exist if the world was vegan". The post was criticized by PolitiFact and USA Today and was flagged by Facebook as "partly false". The Guardian published an article by Laura Spinney on 28 March 2020 titled "Is factory farming to blame for coronavirus?" which mentioned the controversy over Winter's post and concluded, "But the claims are also partly true. Though the links they draw are too simplistic, the evidence is now strong that the way meat is produced – and not just in China – contributed to Covid-19." Spinney also recalled a scientific controversy on whether domesticated horses may have played a larger role than poultry as intermediate hosts for poultry flu at some point in human history, as suggested in a paper by Worobey, Han and Rambault.

In 2021, Winters co-founded another vegan restaurant, the No Catch Co., in Brighton.

Winters wrote and co-produced the 2022 animated short film Milk, which focused on the dairy industry. The film was the 2023 People's Voice Winner in the Video—Animation category at the 2023 Webby Awards.

Winters then produced the film Matilda and the Brave Escape, which tells the story of the Ollerton Eleven and is narrated by the actor Bella Ramsey. Matilda and the Brave Escape won the 2024 People's Voice Winner in the Video—Animation category at the 2024 Webby Awards and won Gold at The Collision Awards in the Kids and Family category.

== Surge ==
=== Animal liberation marches ===
In 2016, Surge co-founded The Official Animal Rights March, which grew from 2,500 participants in London in 2016 to 10,000 in 2017. The events also took place in New York, Los Angeles, Miami and Bucharest in what the activists described as "a consolidated global effort to make the vegan voice heard." In 2019, the number of activists rose to tens of thousands, who marched in 42 cities around the world, including Cologne and Berlin in Germany. In London, around 12,000 activists participated in the march, up from 10,000 in 2017 and 2018.

=== Anti-fur campaigns ===
Under Winters' co-directorship, Surge conducted anti-fur demonstrations at London Fashion Week events attracting more than 250 people in September 2017, a rise from 120 the previous catwalk season and 25 in September 2016. The protest included petitions and a video with Lucy Watson calling on the BFC to ban fur. Winters and fellow activists called upon the British Fashion Council (BFC) to ban all fur from London Fashion Week. The London Fashion Week eventually went fur-free in 2018.

=== Other activism ===
Surge released footage of United Kingdom's dairy farms, which according to Winters "shows not only a flagrant violation of the safety of these animals, but points to the wider systemic issues found throughout the whole dairy industry." In 2017, Surge also produced the documentary Land of Hope and Glory (2017). Land of Hope and Glory contained undercover footage of violence to animals at RSPCA Assured farm, to which the RSPCA responded.

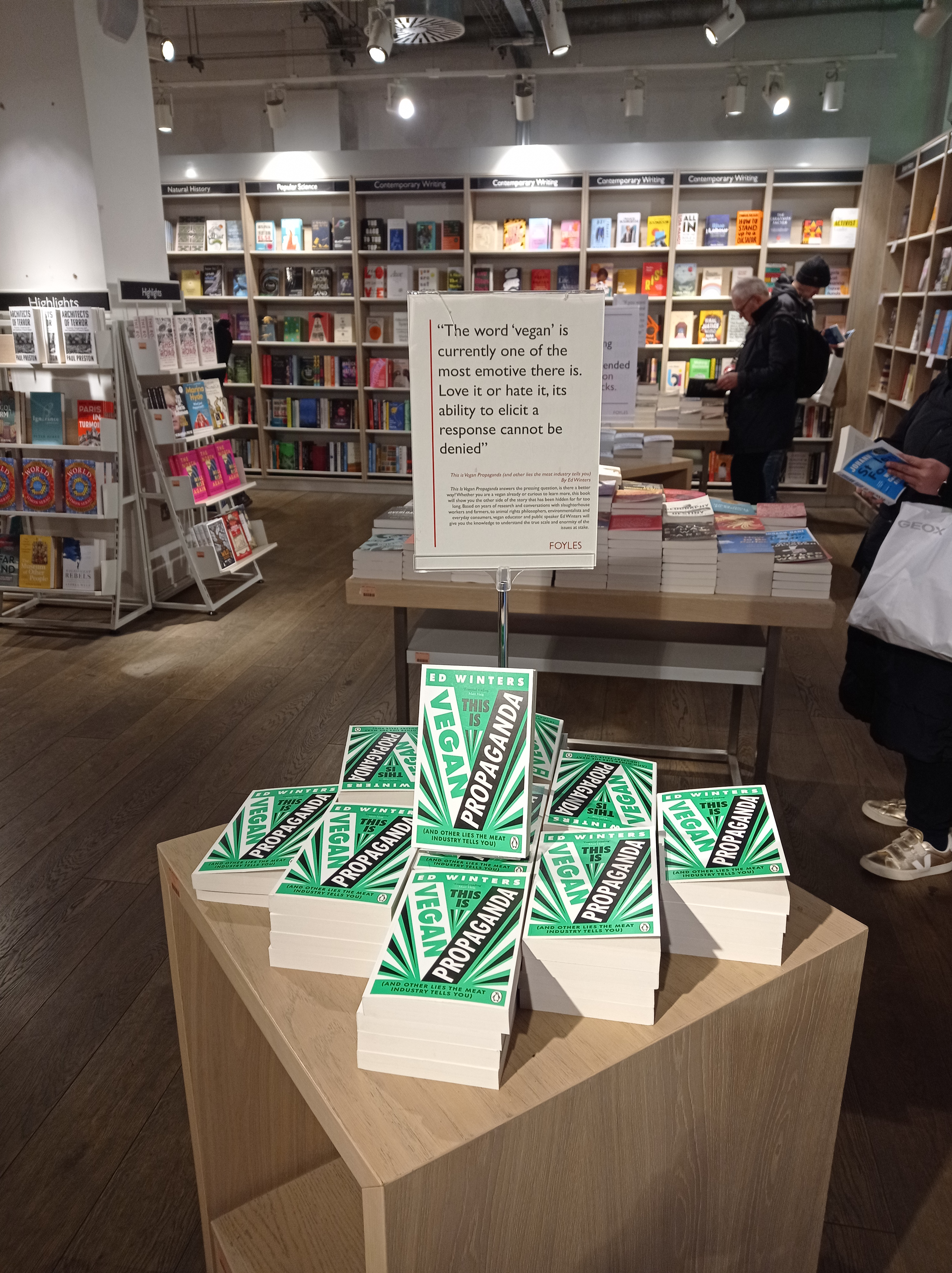
This Is Vegan Propaganda by Ed Winters in a London bookshop

== Selected publications ==
- "This Is Vegan Propaganda: (And Other Lies the Meat Industry Tells You)" (2022) ISBN 978-1-78504-424-3
- "How to Argue With a Meat Eater (And Win Every Time)" (2023) ISBN 978-1-78504-448-9
- "How to Go (and Stay) Vegan" (2025) ISBN 9781785045844

Winters has been described as a best-selling author by media outlets such as Belfast Live.

This is Vegan Propaganda was reviewed as being a "digressive but well-researched introduction to veganism" by Freddie Hayward of the New Statesman. The Times described the book as "a powerful case for giving up meat".

In 2025, both of the earlier books appeared in the suggested reading for Veganuary published by Hertfordshire Council.
