= Ruth Harrison =

English animal welfare activist and writer (1920–2000)

Ruth Harrison OBE
- Harrison in 1965
- Born: Ruth Winsten; 24 June 1920; London, England
- Died: 13 June 2000 (aged 79); London, England
- Education: Bedford College, London
- Occupations: Animal welfare activist and writer
- Notable work: Animal Machines (1964)
- Spouse: Dex Harrison (m. 1954)
- Parents: Stephen Winsten (father); Clara Birnberg (mother)

Ruth Harrison OBE (née Winsten; 24 June 1920 – 13 June 2000) was an English animal welfare activist and writer.

== Biography ==
Harrison was born in London, the daughter of the author Stephen Winsten and the artist Clara Birnberg. She was educated at Bedford College, London. As a Quaker and as a conscientious objector during the Second World War (thereby following the stand of her father in the First World War), she served in the Friends Ambulance Unit, first in Hackney, London, and then with displaced persons in Schleswig-Holstein and Bochum in Germany. Ruth married architect Dex Harrison in 1954. She served on the Farm Animal Welfare Committee.

In 1964, Harrison published Animal Machines, which describes intensive poultry and livestock farming. The book exposed the suffering inflicted on farm animals by industrialised agriculture. The book prompted the British government to appoint a committee chaired by Francis Brambell to investigate the welfare of farm animals. In 1965, the "Brambell Report" was published which outlined Five Freedoms. Harrison's book was published in seven countries and was the inspiration for the European Convention for the Protection of Animals Kept for Farming Purposes. In 1986 she was awarded an OBE.

Harrison died of cancer in 2000, shortly before her eightieth birthday.

== Legacy ==
The Australian ethicist Peter Singer has said that reading Animal Machines was important in his becoming a vegetarian and adopting the views that he sets out in Animal Liberation.

People for the Ethical Treatment of Animals (PETA) president and co-founder Ingrid Newkirk, also credits Harrison's book, Animal Machines, with changing her life.

== Selected publications ==
- Animal Machines: the New Factory Farming Industry. Vincent Stuart Publishers. (1964)
- Case Study: Farm Animals. In R. J. Berry. (1992). Environmental Dilemmas: Ethics and Decisions. Chapman & Hall. ISBN 0-412-39800-1
