= RSPCA Assured =

Farmed animal welfare food assurance scheme

- Founded: 1994
- Type: Farmed animal welfare food assurance scheme
- Purpose: Animal welfare
- Location: Horsham
- Origins: RSPCA
- Region served: United Kingdom

RSPCA Assured is a not-for-profit farm animal welfare assurance and food labelling scheme run by the RSPCA. All farms on the RSPCA Assured scheme must comply with the RSPCA's "stringent higher welfare standards". RSPCA Assured assesses farms, hauliers and abattoirs and if they meet every standard, the RSPCA Assured label can be used on their food product. RSPCA Assured was founded in 1994 as Freedom Food, with the standards of welfare based on the Five Freedoms that were defined by the UK Government's Farm Animal Welfare Committee.

In 2015, Freedom Food was rebranded as RSPCA Assured, which claims that all animals under its scheme are raised to "higher farm animal welfare standards". In 2017, it was estimated that since its creation the RSPCA Assured scheme has raised 600 million animals under its welfare standards. Animal welfare historians have noted that the RSPCA Assured scheme has influenced other humane food certification programs operating worldwide.

In recent years, the RSPCA Assured scheme has received criticism following media coverage of animal cruelty by some workers on RSPCA Assured farms. The RSPCA suspended several farms following the allegations of animal cruelty.

== History ==
=== Freedom Food ===
In 1994, the RSPCA commissioned a survey of consumer attitudes to animal source food products in which 29% of respondents identified animal welfare as a factor influencing their purchase. In response to consumer concerns for welfare the RSPCA focused on improving the transportation of live farm animals. The RSPCA led a national advertising campaign which contained a picture of sheep in a dual-level transporter with the headline "Before they're roasted in garlic and rosemary, they're soaked in urine and excrement". The success of the campaign influenced the development of Freedom Food.

RSPCA Assured was established as Freedom Food in 1994, inspired by the Five Freedoms. The Freedom Food program was designed to allow farm animals "to enjoy a decent life, reflecting an existence as closely as possible to the ideal of the Five Freedoms". The program aimed to establish minimum welfare standards from the birth to death of farm animals. Livestock products meeting the welfare standards were eligible to be labelled "Freedom Food, RSPCA Monitored". Before a farmer, haulier or abattoir can join Freedom Food, an RSPCA approved accessor carries out an audit on the farm or premises to endure that the five freedoms are supported within the production or transportation system. Once enrolled, members of the scheme are subject to assessments to ensure the freedoms are being adhered to. Mandatory annual inspections and random spot checks by the RSPCA are utilized to ensure the welfare standards are being met.

In 1995, supermarkets Tesco and Co-op were selling pork products with the Freedom Food logo and by 1996 Tesco were selling beef, chicken, lamb, pork, veal and egg products endorsed with the Freedom Food symbol. The Freedom Food scheme influenced the formation of animal welfare certification programs such as British Columbia SPCA Certified and Certified Humane in the United States.

The RSPCA's criteria for the Freedom Food symbol on chickens included a ban on growth-promoting antibiotics in chicken feed, a ban on mutilation, at least 8 hours access to the outdoors for free-range birds, humane slaughter practices and stocking density of under 20 birds per square metre. The scheme does not guarantee animals are free-range but ensures that farmed animals have greater space indoors. The scheme states that "all hens must have sufficient freedom of movement to be able, without difficulty, to stand normally, turn around and stretch their wings" and "all hens must have sufficient space to able to perch or sit quietly without repeated disturbance". Members must keep a Veterinary Health Plan with a veterinary surgeon and keep detailed health records.

Freedom Food has been credited with increasing the popularity of free range and barn eggs in the UK. In 2007, 38.2% of total egg production in the UK came from non-cage systems compared to 15% in 1994. During this time the Freedom Food scheme included 150 million animals housed in approximately 1500 production units. By 2013, it was reported that 70% of salmon, 54% of ducks and 31% of pigs were raised under the scheme in the UK. Freedom Food had 2000 labelled product lines. In 2012, Freedom Food managed 98% of the free-range egg market in the UK.

In 2013, McDonald's UK switched to Freedom Food produced pork.

=== RSPCA Assured ===
In 2015, Freedom Food was rebranded as RSPCA Assured. It was reported in 2015 that RSPCA Assured has more than 3500 business participants, covering 43 million land animals and 140 million salmon. RSPCA Assured defines its objective as "to prevent cruelty to animals through the promotion of humane farming, transportation, marketing and slaughter of farm animals by implementing a set of rearing and handling standards". The RSPCA have stated that their certified farms offer a higher standard of care to animals than is legally required.

In 2023, Greggs switched to RSPCA Assured pork. As of 2024, RSPCA Assured covers almost 4,000 farms and supermarkets.

== Allegations of animal cruelty ==
Ruth Harrison, Joanne Bower and Joyce D'Silva were the earliest animal welfare advocates to criticise the RSPCA's Freedom Food scheme in 1994. They argued that although the Freedom Food label is supposed to guarantee farm animals basic freedoms from distress, fear, hunger, injury and pain, the scheme tolerates painful practices such as beak trimming, gestation crates and tail docking.

In January 2024, footage was shared showing RSPCA assured pig farm workers beating animals to death with an iron bar. Other animals were sick or paralysed, but left untreated. The farm was suspended after the footage emerged.

In March 2024, animal rights activists filmed inside an RSPCA Assured chicken hatchery. Chicks were crushed under trolley wheels and trodden on and thrown into crates. Some chicks were left injured and bloodied by accidents.

In April 2024, workers were filmed hitting pigs in the face before they were killed in a carbon dioxide gas chamber. Many of the pigs were from RSPCA Assured farms. The footage showed "animals were clearly frightened and writhing in agony as they were suffocated". The RSPCA called for an end to carbon dioxide killings while simultaneously allowing the use of RSPCA Assured branding on pigs killed using the method.

In May 2024, hens were found suffering at several RSPCA Assured egg farms. Footage showed a living hen trapped upside down, as well as sick hens alongside living ones. Hens with splayed legs, birds with bad feather loss, decomposing bodies and overcrowded nesting areas were also observed. The RSPCA suspended one of four farms involved.

Animal Rising released a report in May 2024 that determined that in numerous instances, RSPCA Assured farms failed to meet the minimum legal standard for animal welfare.

In August 2024, footage released from an RSPCA Assured slaughterhouse showed pigs with visible injuries and wounds as well as lameness, abnormal growths and other deformities being hit by workers and "rushed to the gas chambers with excessive force." Some pigs were observed frothing at the mouth and heavily panting, signs of severe stress. The slaughterhouse also appeared to have "filthy, overcrowded pens" and "poor hygiene practices". Barrister Ayesha Smart, who specialises in animal welfare law, stated the video appeared to show "'multiple and clear breaches' of statutory welfare regulations." The RSPCA responded by stating that they had begun an immediate investigation.

In September 2024, animal rights activists released undercover footage from two dairy farms supplying Marks & Spencer and Müller, one of which was RSPCA Assured. The footage showed workers severely mistreating cows. The farm was suspended from the RSPCA Assured scheme once the footage emerged.

In September 2024, the Advertising Standards Authority launched an investigation into the RSPCA Assured adverts as complaints had been made that they contained misleading welfare claims. Also in September, the RSPCA suspended several Scottish salmon farms over allegations of animal abuse.

In October 2024, undercover footage taken at an RSPCA Assured farm in Bridgwater showed injured animals with large growths living in cramped conditions with no access to clean water.

An open letter signed by dozens of animal rights and welfare organisations calling for the immediate closure of the scheme was sent to the RSPCA's chief executive Chris Sherwood. The letter was also signed by celebrities such as Bryan Adams, Moby, Ricky Gervais and Joanna Lumley, doctors, vets and former RSPCA staff. The letter accused RPSA Assured of "welfare-washing animal cruelty and misleading the public".

=== Response ===
In January, 2024 the RSPCA vowed to reform treatment of chickens in the UK.

In June 2024, Chris Packham President of the RSPCA was disturbed by the footage of dying pigs, starved chickens and eyeless fish on RSPCA Assured farms and commented that it is "utterly indefensible". He called on the charity to immediately suspend its ethical food labelling scheme as customers are being misled. The RSPCA have responded that it would investigate the allegations, but refused to suspend the RSPCA Assured scheme. RSPCA's chief executive Chris Sherwood has commented that "Without RSPCA Assured, millions of farmed animals would be left with even less protection... We know we need to do more and we want to do more, which is why we continually update our standards to drive up welfare for animals not just in the UK but around the world".

In September 2024, vice-president of the RSPCA Brian May resigned over "damning evidence" of bad standards of animal welfare from RSPCA Assured.

In response to footage of animal cruelty and allegations that RSPCA Assured has failed to meet its welfare standards the RSPCA launched an independent review including unannounced visits to more than 200 randomly chosen farms.

== Selected publications ==
- "RSPCA welfare standards for Hatcheries (Chicks, Poults and Ducklings)" (PDF). RSPCA. 2017.
- "RSPCA welfare standards for Laying Hens" (PDF). RSPCA. 2017.
- "RSPCA welfare standards: Beef cattle" (PDF). RSPCA. 2023.
- "RSPCA welfare standards: Farmed Atlantic Salmon" (PDF). RSPCA. 2024.

== See also ==
- Assured Food Standards
