= Bramble (surname) =

Bramble is a surname. Notable people with the surname include:

Notable people with the surname include:

- Alexander Bramble (born 1984), Montserratian footballer
- Anthony Bramble (born 1990), Guyanese cricketer
- A. V. Bramble (1884–1963) British actor and film director
- Curt Bramble, American politician and Certified Public Accountant from Utah
- Downer T. Bramble (1832–1887), American pioneer businessman and politician
- Eldon Bramble (1931–1977), Vincentian cricketer
- Fitzgerald Bramble (born 1967), Saint Vincent and the Grenadines politician and footballer
- James H. Bramble (1930–2021), American mathematician
- Kevin Bramble (born 1972), American disabled ski racer, freeskier, and monoski designer
- Lachlan Bramble (born 1998), professional Australian rules footballer
- Livingstone Bramble or Ras-I Alujah Bramble (1960–2025), Kittian and Nevisian boxer
- Mark Bramble (1950–2019), American theatre director, author and producer
- Percival Austin Bramble (born 1931), Montserratian politician
- Tesfaye Bramble (born 1980), English-born Montserratian footballer
- Titus Bramble (born 1981), English premier league footballer
- TJ Bramble (born 2001) English-born Antiguan footballer
- Todd Bramble (born 1967), American soccer coach
- Tom Bramble, Australian socialist activist, author and retired academic
- William Henry Bramble (1901–1988), Montserratian politician

== Fictional characters with the surname ==
- Mathew and Tabitha Bramble, in the 1771 novel The Expedition of Humphry Clinker by Tobias Smollett
- Colonel Bramble, in Les Silences du Colonel Bramble (Colonel Bramble's Silences) by André Maurois

== See also ==
- Bramble (disambiguation)
- Brambell
