= Animal Machines =

1964 non-fiction book on the animal welfare issues in intensive agriculture

- The cover of the original 1964 edition
- Author: Ruth Harrison
- Language: English
- Subject: Factory farming, animal welfare
- Genre: Non-fiction
- Publisher: Vincent Stuart Ltd.
- Publication date: 1 Dec 1964
- ISBN: 9780722400357

Animal Machines is a 1964 non-fiction book on factory farming written by Ruth Harrison, an English animal welfare activist and author. The book described the harsh conditions in intensive livestock farming and brought the suffering of intensively farmed animals into the public eye, leading to the UK Government to create a committee led by Francis Brambell to investigate farm animal welfare. The committee later published the Brambell Report, which in turn led to the development of the Five Freedoms model of animal welfare.

== Contents ==
Animal Machines contains chapters on major and widespread welfare issues such as broiler hens, fast growing chicken breeds farmed for meat that are predisposed to health conditions such as heart attacks, dermatitis, and lameness; battery hens, where chickens are kept in cramped cages in order to maximise egg production, but at the cost of decreased welfare; and veal calves, young cows grown for meat that are kept in cramped conditions. The book also contained chapters on other common issues found in intensive agriculture. The book concludes by describing the primary arguments for and against factory farming, stating that the arguments against it are from a humanitarian and ethical perspective whilst the arguments in favour are purely economical.

== Reception ==
When published in 1964, Animal Machines prompted public outcry against the conditions in factory farming which for many people were entirely unknown before Harrison revealed them. The public outcry was so great that the British government formed a committee chaired by Francis Brambell to investigate the welfare of farm animals. The report published by the committee, sometimes referred to as the 'Brambell report', summarised that animals should be able “to stand up, lie down, turn around, groom themselves and stretch their limbs.” This report later led to the development of the Five Freedoms, an important milestone in measuring and assessing animal welfare.
