= Marian Filar (pianist) =

Polish concert pianist

Marian Filar (December 17, 1917 – July 10, 2012) was a Polish concert pianist and virtuoso composer living in the United States.

== Early life ==
Filar was born in Warsaw, Poland to a musical Jewish family and began studying piano at the age of five. A year or so later he gave his first recital at the Warsaw Conservatory as a wunderkind. When 12 years of age, he played Mozart's Concerto in D Minor with the Warsaw Philharmonic Orchestra. He again played with the orchestra the following year and gained the interest of Zbigniew Drzewiecki, the noted piano teacher at the Warsaw Conservatory with whom he studied until the outbreak of the Second World War.

== Second World War ==
Filar was imprisoned during World War II in seven different Nazi concentration camps. In the first death camp, Majdanek, he almost died from malnutrition and infection. He escaped being sent to the gas chambers despite his legs being so swollen from malnutrition that he was barely able to stand. After being liberated by the Polish Army he returned to the piano although he did consider studying medicine.

== Subsequent career ==
While playing recitals in Frankfurt, Germany for the Allied Forces, he went to Wiesbaden, Germany where he sought advice from the renowned German pianist, Walter Gieseking who told him not to quit piano. Filar studied with Gieseking for five years and toured all over Europe playing recitals and concerts. During this period (1945–50) he also performed very frequently on German and other European radio programs.

He arrived in the United States in 1950, and lived there since. His American debut was at the Chautauqua Amphitheater where he played Chopin's Concerto in F Minor and received sensational critiques. Invited to join the Philadelphia Orchestra under the direction of Eugene Ormandy he performed regularly in Philadelphia with the Orchestra. In 1951, Filar recorded renditions of six nocturnes, Chopin's Sonata in B Minor, for the now-defunct Colosseum Record Co. in New York City. He made a second recording of 4 preludes by Karol Szymanowski and Etude No 3 in B flat Minor Opus 3, as well as Franciszek Brzezinski's Theme with Variations.

He debuted in Carnegie Hall on January 1, 1952. Filar subsequently continued his career as a concert pianist all over the United States and South America as well as in Europe, while teaching at the Settlement School of Music in Philadelphia from 1953 to 1958. He was appointed to the chair at the Temple University School of Music piano department in 1958. Prof. Filar retired from teaching at Temple University in 1988 though he remained an Emeritus Professor in the Boyer School of Music and Dance. In 1992 he went to Poland where he played with the Warsaw Philharmonic Orchestra once again.

In 2002, he co-authored a book about his life during and after World War II entitled From Buchenwald to Carnegie Hall.

== Death ==
Filar died in Wyncote, Pennsylvania on July 10, 2012, aged 94.

== Publications ==
- From Buchenwald to Carnegie Hall (co-author with Charles Patterson), University Press of Mississippi, first edition, 2002. ISBN 978-1-57806-419-9

Marian Filar's other recordings
Composer	Piece	Orchestra	Conductor
Chopin	Piano Concerto No. 1 in E Minor	Danish Radio Symphony Orchestra	Erik Tuxsen
Chopin	Piano Concerto No. 2 in F Minor	Bavarian Symphony Orchestra	Rafael Kubelik
Tchaikovsky	Piano Concerto in B flat Major{fact}	Washington National Symphony Orchestra	Emerson Meyers
Schumann	Piano Concerto in A Minor	Orchestra Sinfonica, São Paulo, Brasil	
Chopin	Prelude in D Minor Op. 28 No. 24		
Chopin	Mazurka in F sharp Minor Op. 6 No 1		
Tauriello	Toccata		
Chopin	Nocturne: E flat Major Op.9 no.2		
Chopin	Nocturne: C sharp Minor Op. 27 No. 1		
Chopin	Nocturne: D flat Major Op. 27 No 2		
Chopin	Nocturne: E flat Major Op. 55 No. 2		
Chopin	Nocturne: E flat Minor Op. 72 No. 1		
Chopin	Nocturne: C sharp Minor Lento con gran espressione (posthumous)		
Chopin	Polonaise in C flat Minor No. 1		
Chopin	Nocturne in C flat Minor Op. 27 No. 1		
Chopin	Ballade No. 1		
Chopin	Etude in E Major Op. 10 No.3		
Chopin	Barcarolle Op. 60		
Chopin	Scherzo in B-flat minor Op. 31 No.2		
Chopin	Mazurka in C sharp Minor Op. 63 No. 3		
Chopin	Polonaise in A flat Major No. 6		
Chopin	Fantasie in F Minor Op. 49		
