= Joey Carbstrong =

Australian animal rights activist, vegan and former criminal

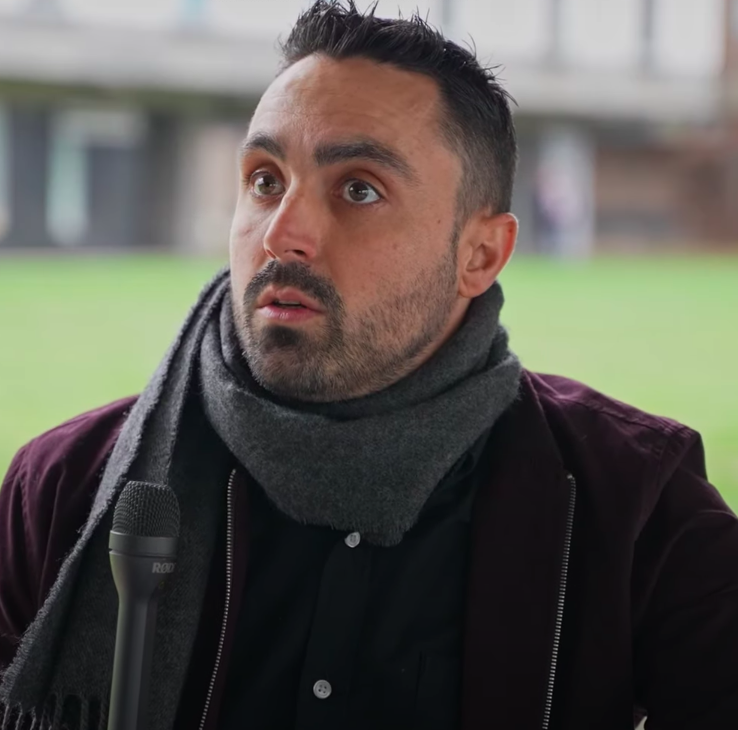
- Born: Joseph Dominic Armstrong; November 26, 1988 (age 37); Adelaide, South Australia
- Occupation: Animal rights activist

YouTube information
- Channel: Joey Carbstrong
- Years active: 2015–present
- Subscribers: 174 thousand
- Views: 45 million
- Last updated: October 2025
- Website: www.joeycarbstrong.com

Joseph Dominic Armstrong (born 26 November 1988), known professionally as Joey Carbstrong, is an Australian animal rights activist, based in the United Kingdom. A former criminal, he has since become an advocate for animal liberation and veganism through social media and public speaking engagements, as well as debates and various televised interviews. Carbstrong also does investigative work in animal rights, having investigated slaughter houses. He has campaigned against the RSPCA Assured scheme and has released undercover footage of animal cruelty on their farms.

== Personal life ==
Carbstrong was born Joseph Dominic Armstrong in Adelaide, South Australia. He has publicly stated that before his fame he was involved in substance abuse and crime. He became a vegan after his release from incarceration. He has a tattoo of the word "Vegan" behind his right ear.

At the age of 14, he had left school and developed a heavy drug addiction. He had various blue-collar jobs before receiving welfare at age 22. By this point he had gained a lengthy criminal record which included three assaults. He spent 18 months under house arrest. He was arrested in September 2011 after police discovered a concealed, loaded shotgun which Armstrong was bringing to a drug deal. Multiple weapons and additional ammunition in his hotel room were also discovered and he spent six months in jail. Armstrong described having an epiphany while in jail, deciding to change his life, saying, "I began seeing my life with new eyes. I'd seen all the other prisoners in there and didn't want to be there, I wanted to leave the gangs." In May 2021, he released a video to celebrate eight years of sobriety.

== Animal rights advocacy ==
Carbstrong has been involved in animal rights street activism in Australia, Hong Kong, and the United Kingdom, promoting groups such as Anonymous for the Voiceless and the Save Movement, an organisation that holds vigils outside slaughterhouses and promotes veganism by sharing images and footage from farms and slaughterhouses on social media.

The footage which was released by Carbstrong and his team

In May 2023, Carbstrong published pictures said to have been taken from hidden cameras at a Pilgrim's Pride abattoir in Ashton-under-Lyne depicting the "utterly inhumane" nature of using carbon dioxide to stun pigs before being killed. Carbstrong captured the undercover footage for his documentary Pignorant.

Carbstrong has released undercover footage of animal cruelty at RSPCA Assured farms. Footage showed workers hitting cows with implements on long poles and kicking them. In September 2024, Carbstrong commented that "our latest investigation exposes the facade behind the RSPCA's Assured label, which is meaningless in protecting animals".

In 2025, undercover footage of animal cruelty at T&S Abattoir in Arley, Warwickshire was released. Carbstrong had installed secret cameras at the halal slaughterhouse in July 2024 and obtained over 200 hours of footage. The footage showed animals being dismembered and having their throats cut whilst still showing signs of consciousness. The Food Standards Agency and Warwickshire Police launched an investigation into the claims of animal cruelty.

In October 2025, undercover footage of animal cruelty was released at Trevear Farm near Penzance and Polshea Farm near Bodmin. The footage that was taken by Carbstrong and his team between September and October 2022 showed farmers hitting cows and sticking them with sharp objects to make them compliant. Both farms supply milk through Davidstow Creamery to Saputo Dairy UK, who produce the cheese brand Cathedral City. Saputo Dairy UK has launched an investigation and suspended milk collection at Polshear Farm.

=== Debates ===
In January 2018, he began a 'Vegan Prophecy UK tour', which involved protesting against multiple slaughterhouses.

In 2018, Carbstrong appeared on the British TV programme This Morning to debate two farmers. During the heated discussion, Carbstrong described artificial insemination of cows as a form of sexual abuse and said the dairy industry "sexually violates" cows. On the Jeremy Vine Show, Carbstrong criticised the host Vine's ham and cheese sandwich. In 2020, he appeared in Veganville on BBC Three.

=== 2024 arrest ===
In April 2024, Carbstrong and six other vegan activists were arrested after they occupied an elevated area at Cranswick Country Foods in Watton. Carbstrong has stated that he wanted to raise awareness about the unethical use of gas chambers to slaughter pigs.

== See also ==
- List of animal rights advocates
- List of vegans
