= Bramwell =

Bramwell may refer to:

- Bramwell (TV series), a British television drama series
- Bramwell (name), a given name and surname
- Bramwell, Idaho, an unincorporated community
- Bramwell, West Virginia, a town in the U.S.
