= David Gatenby =

Australian cricketer and farmer (born 1952)

Personal information
- Full name: David John Gatenby
- Born: 12 February 1952 (age 74); Launceston, Tasmania, Australia
- Batting: Right-handed
- Bowling: Right-arm leg break, googly
- Relatives: Peter Gatenby (brother)

Domestic team information
- Years: Team
- 1972/73: Canterbury
- 1978/79: Tasmania
- FC debut: 23 December 1972 Canterbury v Otago
- Last FC: 24 February 1979 Tasmania v New South Wales
- Only LA: 3 December 1972 Canterbury v Otago

Career statistics
Competition	First-class	List A
Matches	9	1
Runs scored	83	3
Batting average	10.37	3.00
100s/50s	0/0	0/0
Top score	17*	3
Balls bowled	1,194	64
Wickets	12	1
Bowling average	52.25	36.00
5 wickets in innings	0	0
10 wickets in match	0	0
Best bowling	3/23	1/36
Catches/stumpings	6/–	2/–
- Source: CricketArchive, 15 August 2010

David John Gatenby OAM (born 12 February 1952) is an Australian cricketer and farmer. He played cricket in Australia for Tasmania and in New Zealand for Canterbury. He was a right-handed batsman and leg-spin bowler.

Born in Launceston, Gatenby attended Scotch College there, then studied at Lincoln College in Christchurch in the early 1970s, earning a Diploma of Agriculture. While there he played a season of five first-class matches and one one-day match for Canterbury in the New Zealand cricket season of 1972–73. He returned to Tasmania, and played four first-class matches in the 1978–79 season.

Gatenby runs a sheep farming property near Campbell Town. He was the president of the Tasmanian Farmers and Graziers Association from 2008 to 2013. He was later a member of the Heritage Council of Tasmania, and the Tasmanian Forest Practices Board. He was awarded the Order of Australia Medal for his services to farming in the 2025 Australia Day Honours.
