= Gatenby v Gatenby =

South African legal case

Gatenby v Gatenby and Others is an important case in South African law, heard in the Eastern Cape Division by Jones J on March 28 and April 9, 1996, with judgment handed down on April 23. IJ Smuts appeared for the applicant, and MJ Lowe for the respondents.

Section 49(2) of the Close Corporations Act gives the court the power to order the sale of a corporation asset in order to enable a member who is being prejudiced, as contemplated by section 49, to be paid out for his interest and thereby to bring about a termination of his membership. There is no justification, the court found, in either the wording or the spirit of section 49 for limiting the court's discretion by interpreting section 49(2) as not authorising the court to order a corporation to sell its assets. The power of the Court to "make such order as it thinks fit [...] for regulating the future conduct of the affairs of the corporation" is not restricted to an order relating to the pursuance of the objects contained in the corporation's founding statement: i.e. an order relating to the running of the business of the corporation.

There were no authoritative pronouncements about the meaning and effect of section 49 of the Close Corporations Act. The section had not been considered by the court. But guidance was to be found in the authorities which interpret and apply the similarly-worded section 252 of the Companies Act, dealing with oppressive or unfairly prejudicial conduct in the management of limited liability companies.

The object of section 49 of the Close Corporations Act is to come to the relief of the victim of oppressive conduct. The section gives the court the power to make orders "with a view to settling the dispute" between the members of a close corporation if it is just and equitable to do so. To this end the court is given a wide discretion. It may "make such order as it thinks fit," within the framework of either "regulating the future conduct of the affairs of the corporation" or "the purchase of the interest of any member of the corporation by other members thereof or by the corporation." These, the court noted, are far-reaching powers. One member can be compelled to purchase the interest of another at a fair price, whether he wants to or not.

There is no reason, the court found, why that portion of section 49 which provides for "regulating the future conduct of the affairs of the corporation" should be interpreted in such a way as to prevent the achievement of the underlying equitable principle of legislation relating to companies and close corporations as well as of the common law relating to co-ownership and partnerships, namely that no co-owner, no partner, no shareholder and no member is normally obliged to remain a co-owner, partner, shareholder or member against his will in circumstances where this is unfair or oppressive to him. The objects of section 49 of the Close Corporations Act are not advanced by limiting the Court's power to making orders relating to the day-to-day running of the ordinary business of the corporation. The court held that this section is designed for an extraordinary situation.

Section 49 of the Close Corporations Act places a similar onus on a member who considers that he is being unfairly prejudiced and seeks to invoke its provisions as does section 252 of the Companies Act. The member must establish "not only that a particular act or omission of a [corporation] results in a state of affairs which is unfairly prejudicial, unjust or inequitable to him, but that the particular act or omission itself was one which was unfair or unjust or inequitable. Similarly [...] where the complaint relates to the manner of conduct of the business, it is the manner in which the affairs have been conducted as well as the result of the conduct of the business in that manner which must be shown to be unfairly prejudicial, unjust or inequitable."

The dictum in Garden Province Investment v Aleph was duly applied.

== See also ==
- Close corporation
- Law of South Africa
- South African company law
