= Michael Brambell =

British zoologist (1932–2026)

Michael Rogers Brambell (2 August 1932 – 18 October 2026) was a British zoologist, who was director of the Chester Zoo, from 1978 to 1995. He won the 1999 Silver Medal of the Zoological Society of London.

== Life and career ==
Michael Rogers Brambell was born in London, on 2 August 1932. He was the son of Francis W. R. Brambell, head of Zoology at the University of Bangor between the 1930s and 1960s, after whom the Brambell Laboratory (Grade II listed) in Bangor is still named.

He grew up in Bangor, North Wales, where he attended Hillgrove School.

Brambell was curator of mammals at the London Zoo, when Chi Chi was there.

He was an exponent of captive breeding, to forestall animal extinction. In 2013, he wrote to The Guardian about the plausibility of relocation of wild species which had been bred in captivity into wild habitats.

Brambell died on 18 October 2026, aged 94.

== Works ==
- Horse, tapir & rhinoceros, Bodley Head, 1976, ISBN 978-0-370-01593-4
- Michael R. Brambell, London Zoo's Giant panda: Ailuropoda melatiolenca: 'Chi Chi', 1957–1972. International Zoo Yearbook, Volume 14, Issue 1, pages 163–164. Published online 18 December 2007. The Zoological Society of London, 1985. doi:10.1111/j.1748-1090.1974.tb00809.x
