= Bramble (disambiguation) =

Bramble is the common name of a large and diverse genus Rubus of flowering plants.

Bramble or Brambles may also refer to:

== Places ==
- Bramble, Indiana, United States
- Bramble, Minnesota, United States
- Bramble Bank, or The Brambles, a sandbank in the Solent, England
- Bramble Cay, Australia
- Bramble Peak, Victoria Land, Antarctica

== Ships and boats ==
- HMS Bramble, the name of several ships of the Royal Navy
  - Bramble-class gunboat (1886)
  - Bramble-class gunboat (1898)
- Brambles, a tug, earlier Empire Teak
- USCGC Bramble, a United States Coast Guard buoy tender

== Other uses ==
- Bramble (cat), a cat breed
- Bramble (cocktail), a drink containing blackberry liqueur
- Bramble (graph theory), a family of connected subgraphs
- Bramble (surname), including a list of people and fictional characters with the name
- Bramble: The Mountain King, a 2023 videogame
- Bramble, a publishing imprint of Tor Books
- Bramble, a horse, sire of the thoroughbred racehorse Ben Brush
- Bramble, a main character of the Chinese animated cartoon brand Boonie Bears
- Brambles Limited, a listed Australian company

== See also ==
- Blackberry, is an edible fruit of many species in the genus Rubus
- Bramble shark, a species of shark
