= Roberta Kalechofsky =

American animal rights activist

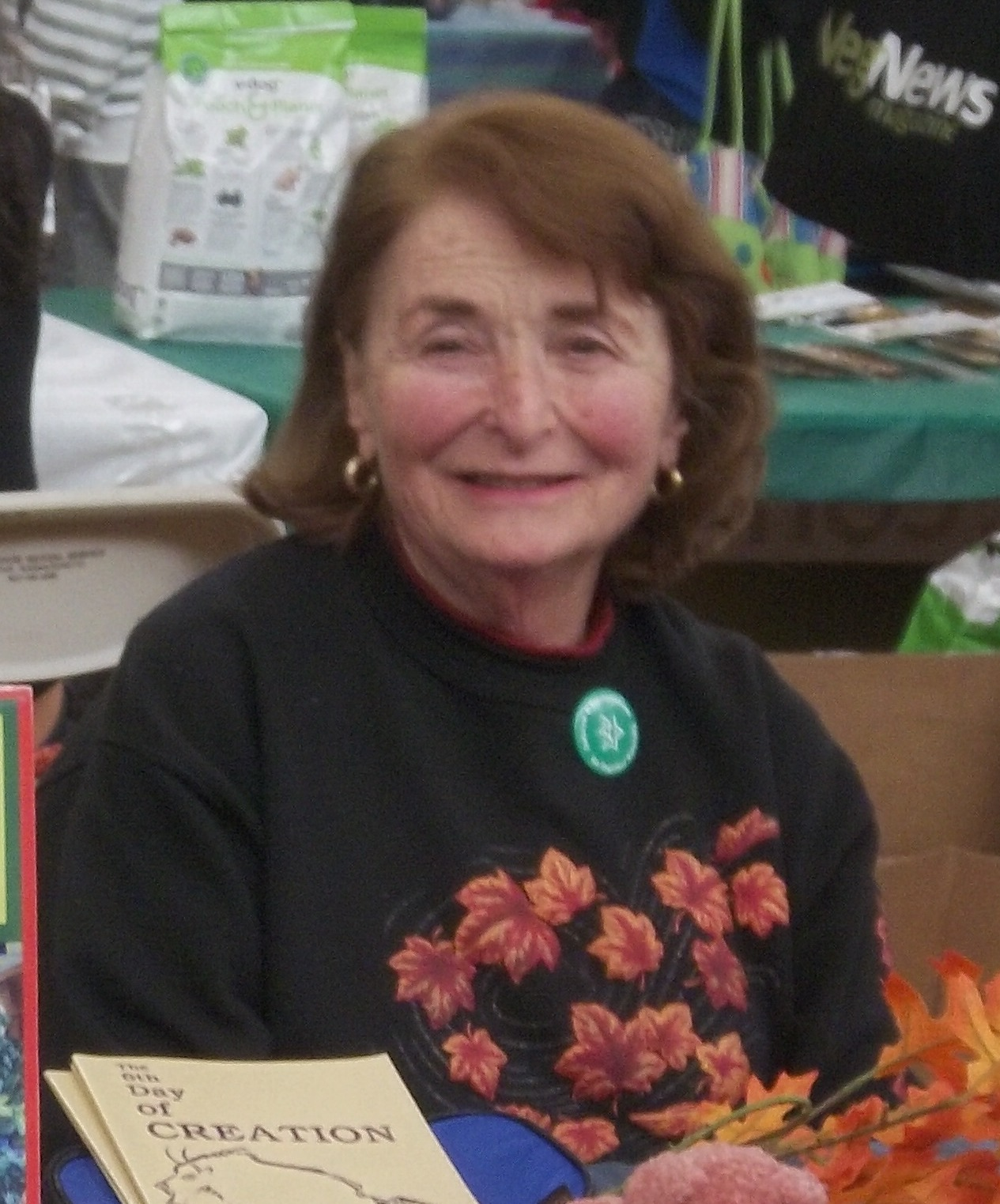
- Kalechofsky in 2013
- Born: May 11, 1931; Brooklyn, New York, United States
- Died: April 5, 2022 (aged 90)
- Education: Brooklyn College, New York University
- Occupations: Author, activist
- Spouse(s): Robert Kalechofsky (mathematician, retired professor, author), until his passing in December 2020
- Relatives: 2 sons
- Writing career
- Genres: History and biography, short plays, religious genre novels, vegetarian cookbooks, Jewish religious literature
- Subjects: Feminism, animal rights, Jewish vegetarianism
- Website: www.micahbooks.com

Roberta Kalechofsky (May 11, 1931 – April 5, 2022) was an American writer, feminist and animal rights activist, focusing on the issue of animal rights within Judaism and the promotion of vegetarianism within the Jewish community. She was the founder of Jews for Animal Rights and Micah Publications or Micah Books, which specializes in the publication of animal rights, Jewish vegetarianism, and Holocaust literature.

== Biography ==
Kalechofsky was born in Brooklyn and attended Brooklyn College, receiving her B.A. in 1952, followed by an M.A. in English literature from New York University in 1956, and a Ph.D. from the same university in 1970, also in English literature. She taught at the University of Connecticut and Brooklyn College.

Kalechofsky was married to Robert Kalechofsky—a retired mathematics professor from Salem State University who was also a vegetarian—until his death in December 2020. They appeared together representing Micah Books at publisher, writer, vegetarian, and animal advocacy events around North America, including the Boston Vegetarian Society's annual Boston Vegetarian Food Festival. Their two sons each have earned doctorates.

== Career ==
Kalechofsky was the author of Animal Suffering and the Holocaust: The Problem with Comparisons (2003), as well as poetry, seven works of illustrative fiction, two collections of essays, and a monograph on George Orwell. Micah Publications, which Kalechofsky founded in 1975, has published two haggadot for a vegetarian seder, one of which, Haggadah for the Liberated Lamb, has been exhibited at Harvard University in an exhibit on food and politics, and at the Jewish Museum in New York.

Philosopher Tom Regan has said of Kalechofsky, "[o]f all the historians of ideas with whom I am familiar, if I had a choice between listening to just one of them, I would not hesitate to choose Roberta. She is that good, that worth spending time with."

== Jews for Animal Rights (JAR) ==
Kalechofsky founded Jews for Animal Rights (JAR) in 1985 with the aim of upholding and spread the Talmudic prohibition against causing suffering to living creatures, known as tza'ar ba'alei hayyim. The group promotes the ideas of Rabbi Abraham Kook on vegetarianism, and campaigns to find alternatives to animal testing.

She was a member of PETA, but has been critical of their "Holocaust On Your Plate", linking the consumption of animals to the Holocaust.

== Selected publications ==
=== Nonfiction ===
- Autobiography of A Revolutionary: Essays on My Life as an Animal Rights Activist (1991)
- Judaism and Animal Rights: Classical and Contemporary Responses (1992)
- Haggadah for the Vegetarian Family (1993)
- Journey of the Liberated Lamb: Reflections for a Vegetarian Seder (1994)
- Rabbis and Vegetarianism: An Evolving Tradition (1996)
- The Jewish Vegetarian Year Cookbook (1997)
- Vegetarian Judaism: A Guide for Everyone (1998)
- Animal Suffering and the Holocaust: The Problem With Comparisons (2003)
- The Vegetarian Shabbat Cookbook (2010)

=== Novels ===
- Justice, My Brother (1972) aka Justice, My Brother, My Sister: Life and Death in a Mexican Family
- Stephen’s Passion (1975) aka The Martyrdom of Stephen Werner
- Orestes in Progress (1976)
- Bodmin, 1349: An Epic Novel of Christians and Jews in the Plague Years (1988)
- The Book of Anonymities (2020)

=== Short stories ===
- Solomon's Wisdom and Other Stories (1978)
- K'tia, a Savior of the Jewish People and Other Stories (1995)
- Job Enters a Pain Clinic and Other Stories (2005)
- Four Women from Ravensbruck: 5 Stories from the Shoa (2011)

== See also ==
- Animals and the environment in Jewish ethics
- Animal cruelty and the Holocaust analogy
- List of animal rights advocates
- Jewish vegetarianism
