= Five Freedoms =

Aspects of animal welfare under human control

The Five Freedoms, sometimes referred to as the Five Freedoms model, is a framework for assessing animal welfare that uses an outline of five aspects. All animals possess an inherent need for the freedom to turn around, groom and dry themselves, stand upright, lie down, and stretch their limbs. They were developed in response to a 1965 UK Government report on livestock husbandry, and were formalised in a 1979 press statement by the UK Farm Animal Welfare Council. They have been adopted by the European Union and in some other countries and endorsed by some professional groups including the Federation of Veterinarians of Europe, and organisations including the World Organisation for Animal Health, the Royal Society for the Prevention of Cruelty to Animals, and the American Society for the Prevention of Cruelty to Animals.

== Current compact ==
The five freedoms as expressed by the Farm Animal Welfare Council in 2009 are:

1. Freedom from hunger or thirst by ready access to fresh water and a diet to maintain full health and vigour
2. Freedom from discomfort by providing an appropriate environment including shelter and a comfortable resting area
3. Freedom from pain, injury or disease by prevention or rapid diagnosis and treatment
4. Freedom to express (most) normal behaviour by providing sufficient space, proper facilities and company of the animal's own kind
5. Freedom from fear and distress by ensuring conditions and treatment which avoid mental suffering

== History ==
In 1965, the UK government commissioned an investigation, led by Professor Roger Brambell, into the welfare of intensively farmed animals, partly in response to concerns raised in Ruth Harrison's 1964 book, Animal Machines. The Brambell Report stated "An animal should at least have sufficient freedom of movement to be able without difficulty, to turn round, groom Itself, get up, lie down and stretch its limbs". This short recommendation became known as Brambell's Five Freedoms.

As a result of the report, the Farm Animal Welfare Advisory Committee was created to monitor the livestock production sector. In July 1979, this was replaced by the Farm Animal Welfare Council, and by the end of that year, the Five Freedoms had been codified into the recognisable list format.

Some countries, such as New Zealand, have proposed going further than the Five Freedoms to "Five Domains" to include a focus on the mental health of the animal following New Zealand becoming the fifth country to legally recognize animal sentience in 2015. As of 2021, animal sentience was also recognized in Chile, Colombia, Peru, Tanzania, the United Kingdom, and all EU countries.

Companies and countries following the Five Freedoms model frequently utilize their animal welfare standards as a competitive advantage. RSPCA Assured food labeling scheme (formerly Freedom Food) in the United Kingdom is based on the Five Freedoms. Major New Zealand exporters like Silver Fern Farms and Ziwi Pets highlight their adherence to the Five Freedoms in their marketing.
