= Bramwell, Idaho =

Unincorporated community in the state of Idaho, United States

Coordinates: 43°50′18″N 116°34′58″W

Bramwell is an unincorporated community in Gem County, in the U.S. state of Idaho.

== History ==
The first settlement at Bramwell was made in 1902. The community was named after Franklin S. Bramwell, a Mormon leader.
