= Brimble Pit and Cross Swallet Basins =

Geological Site of Special Scientific Interest in Somerset, England

- Site of Special Scientific Interest
- Location within Somerset
- Location of Brimble Pit and Cross Swallet Basins.
- Area of search: Somerset
- Grid reference: ST512505
- Coordinates: 51.25157°N 2.70061°W
- Interest: Geological
- Area: 154.3 hectares (1.543 km^{2}; 0.596 sq mi)
- Notification date: 1987

Brimble Pit and Cross Swallet Basins (grid reference ST512505) is a 154.3 hectare (381.3 acre) geological Site of Special Scientific Interest between Wookey Hole and Priddy in the Mendip Hills, Somerset, notified in 1987.

The site covers the two adjacent karstic basins draining into Brimble Pit and Cross Swallet. These are the two best defined of the belt of large shallow closed depressions which account for the total Topography along the southern edge of the Mendip Hills. The Brimble Pit depression has a large old lake sediment floor now pitted with sinkholes, while the Cross Swallet Basin feeds to a single active sinkhole around which are well preserved terraces of both rock and sediment. Both depressions have marginal cols feeding to overflow channels now permanently dry. The site also contains important Pleistocene/Quaternary mammal remains within sediments infilling former caverns exposed on the north east face of Westbury Quarry.

The swallet was excavated by William Stanton between 1991 & 1992 for spelaeological purposes. However, archaeological material was discovered, leading Stanton to separate the deposits he was removing and examine them for archaeological material, which included 42 sherds of Grooved Ware pottery and a polished greenstone axehead.

The area is included in the Cook's Fields Nature Reserve run by the Somerset Wildlife Trust.

The Site of Special Scientific Interest is divided into units by Natural England. The Church Commissioners own the land on which part of unit 1 is situated
