= Holocaust analogy in animal rights =

Comparison between treatment of animals and the Holocaust

Individuals and groups have drawn direct comparisons between animal cruelty and the Holocaust. The analogies began soon after the end of World War II, when literary figures, many of them Holocaust survivors, Jewish, or both, began to draw parallels between the treatment of animals by humans and the treatments of prisoners in Nazi death camps. The Letter Writer, a 1968 short story by Isaac Bashevis Singer, is a literary work often cited as the seminal use of the analogy. The comparison has been criticized by organizations that campaign against antisemitism, including the Anti-Defamation League (ADL) and the United States Holocaust Memorial Museum, particularly since 2006, when PETA began to make heavy use of the analogy as part of campaigns for improved animal welfare.

The use of the term holocaust in relation to the mass killing of animals predates the Nazi Holocaust. In 1897, American zoologist and animal-rights advocate J. Howard Moore published an essay titled "The Unconscious Holocaust", in which he applied the term to the killing of animals for food, clothing, and sport. At the time, holocaust was commonly used in the broader sense of complete or wholesale destruction, rather than as the later proper name for the Nazi genocide of Ashkenazi Jews.

== Comparisons ==
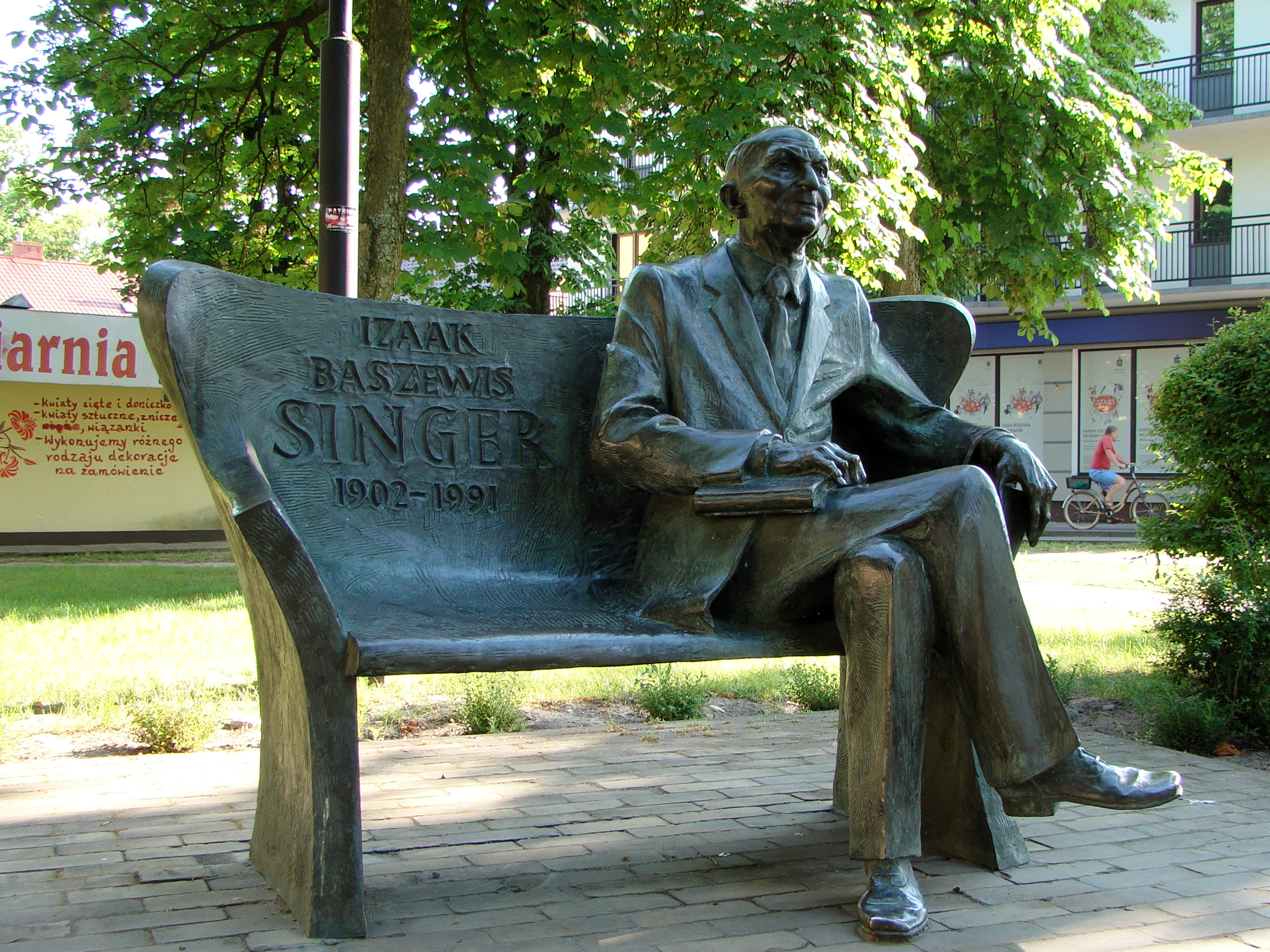
Isaac Bashevis Singer's quote, "In relation to [animals], all people are Nazis; for the animals, it is an eternal Treblinka", became a classic reference in the discussions about the legitimacy of the comparison of animal exploitation with the Holocaust.

Former Treblinka commandant Franz Stangl later recalled: “When I was on a trip once, years later in Brazil, my train stopped next to a slaughterhouse. The cattle in the pens, hearing the noise of the train, trotted up to the fence and stared at the train. They were very close to my window, one crowding the other, looking at me through that fence. I thought then, ‘Look at this; this reminds me of Poland; that’s just how the people looked, trustingly, just before they went into the tins . . .’ . . . I couldn’t eat tinned meat after that. Those big eyes . . . which looked at me . . . not knowing that in no time at all they’d all be dead.”

Perhaps the earliest use of the analogy comes from Edgar Kupfer-Koberwitz, a German concentration camp survivor and journalist, who wrote in 1940 in his "Dachau Diaries" from inside the Dachau Concentration Camp that "I have suffered so much myself that I can feel other creatures' suffering by virtue of my own". He further wrote, "I believe as long as man tortures and kills animals, he will torture and kill humans as well—and wars will be waged—for killing must be practiced and learned on a small scale".

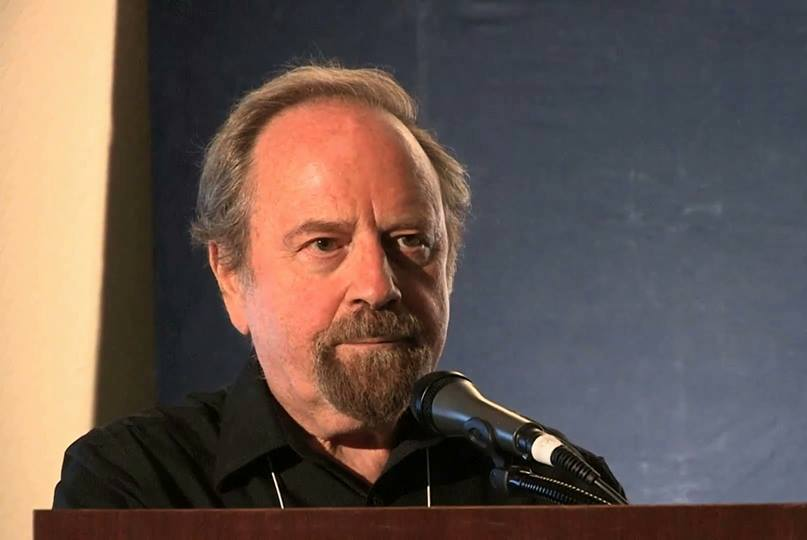
Holocaust survivor and animal rights activist Alex Hershaft has compared the treatment of livestock to the Holocaust.

Another Holocaust survivor who has written on the subject is Alex Hershaft, now a vegan activist, who also compared the treatment of livestock to the Holocaust. He has stated that "We're focusing on the victims rather than the cancer of oppression itself", and that "I noted with horror the striking similarities between what the Nazis did to my family and my people, and what we do to animals we raise for food: the branding or tattooing of serial numbers to identify victims, the use of cattle cars to transport victims to their death, the crowded housing of victims in wood crates, the arbitrary designation of who lives and who dies — the Christian lives, the Jew dies; the dog lives, the pig dies."

Polish-American author Isaac Bashevis Singer, who received the Nobel Prize in Literature in 1978, made the comparison in several of his stories. In the 1968 The Letter Writer, the protagonist says, "In relation to [animals], all people are Nazis; for the animals, it is an eternal Treblinka." In The Penitent the protagonist says "when it comes to animals, every man is a Nazi".

J. M. Coetzee, a South African–Australian writer who received the Nobel Prize in Literature in 2003, said of the Nazis' treatment of Jews: "... in the 20th century, a group of powerful and bloody-minded men in Germany hit on the idea of adapting the methods of the industrial stockyard, as pioneered and perfected in Chicago, to the slaughter – or what they preferred to call the processing – of human beings."

In her 2005 book The Holocaust and the Henmaid's Tale: A Case for Comparing Atrocities, animal rights advocate Karen Davis says that the horrors of the Holocaust and the treatment of animals by contemporary society can and should be "reasonably and enlighteningly compared" as a way to raise awareness to something that "most people do not want to hear about, or have trouble imagining, or would just as soon forget." The general population cannot fathom the comparison, she maintains, as the Holocaust has become "iconic and 'historical,' whereas the human manufacture of animal suffering is so pervasive that many people find it hard to even regard the slaughter of animals as a form of violence." She quotes Matt Prescott, creator of PETA's controversial "Holocaust on your Plate" campaign, who says "Holocaust victims WERE treated like animals, and so logically we can conclude that animals are treated like Holocaust victims."

In 2014, philosopher and animal rights activist Steven Best argued that using a phrase like "animal holocaust" in a serious way can help illuminate the "incomprehensible scale and scope of the violence humans inflict on animals," which amounts to hundreds of billions of terrestrial and aquatic animals killed annually just for food alone. He also notes that conditions on CAFOs "resemble the mechanized production lines of concentration camps" where animals are "forced to produce maximal quantities of meat milk and eggs – an intense coercion that takes place through physical confinement but also now through chemical and genetic manipulation. As typical in Nazi compounds, this forced and intensive labor terminates in death."

Belgian writer Marguerite Yourcenar wrote that if we had not accepted the inhumane transportation of animals to the slaughterhouses we would not have accepted the transportation of humans to the concentration camps. In another article, she wrote that every act of cruelty suffered by thousands of living creatures is a crime against humanity.

American animal rights activist Gary Yourofsky compared factory farms to concentration camps. He has stated, "Jews have been, while animals still are, treated like nothing, as if their lives don't matter. You can also compare the two holocausts this way. ... Go to the nearest cow or pig slaughterhouse and remove the animals and replace them with humans. You have now re-created Birkenau."

The ADL has also listed a number of animal rights groups that have made the comparison. No Compromise, a website for radical animal liberationists, likened the direct action of the Animal Liberation Front to "those who destroyed Forever [sic] the gas chambers of Buchenwald and Auschwitz".

== PETA comments and imagery ==
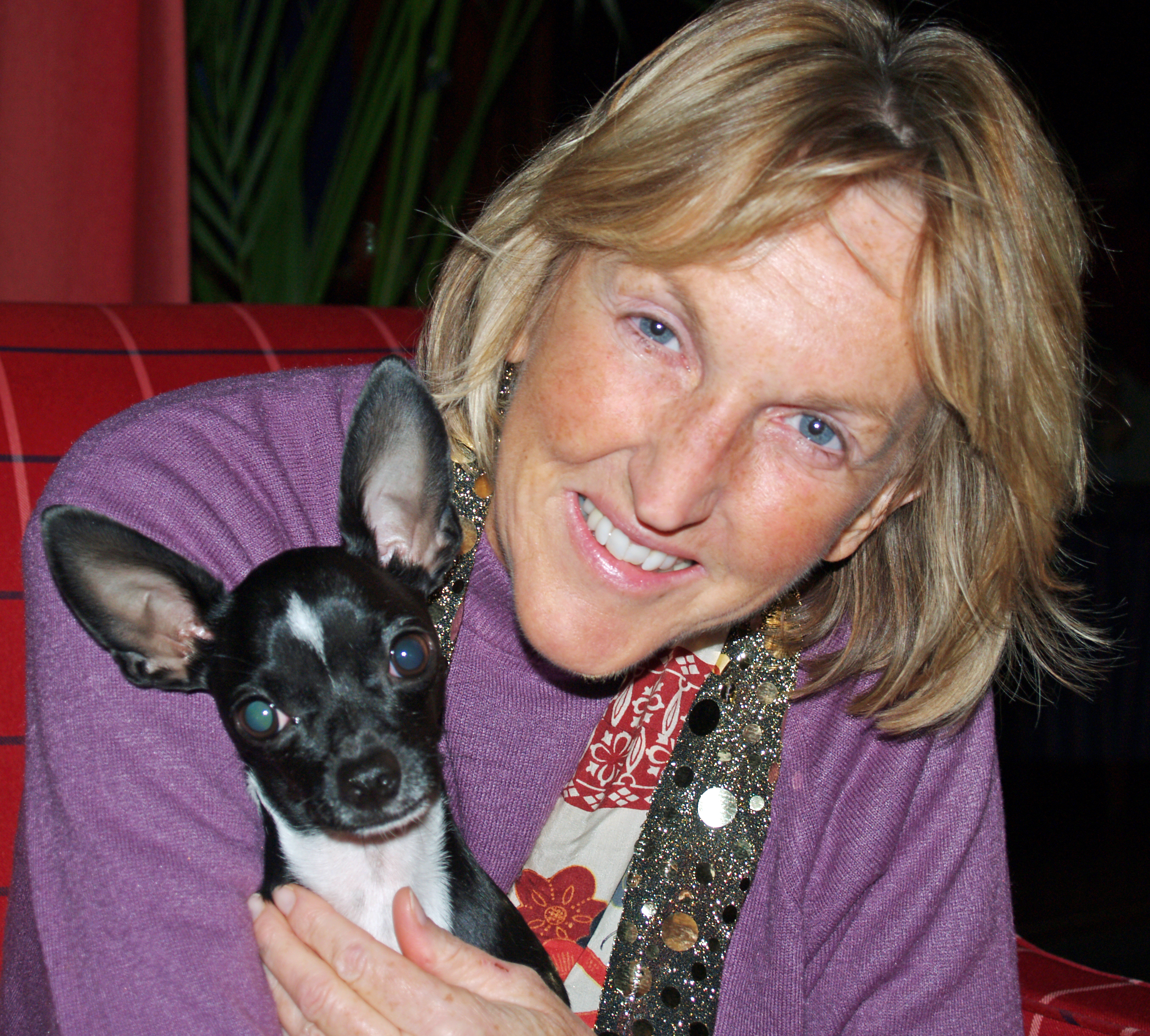
PETA president Ingrid Newkirk. PETA launched a "Holocaust on Your Plate" campaign in the early 2000s.

In 2006, Ingrid Newkirk, the president of People for the Ethical Treatment of Animals (PETA), said: "Six million Jews died in concentration camps, but six billion broiler chickens will die this year in slaughterhouses" as part of the organization's "Holocaust on Your Plate" campaign. An exhibition for the campaign consisted of eight 5.6-square-metre (60 sq ft) panels, each juxtaposing images of the Holocaust with images of factory-farmed animals. Photographs of concentration camp inmates were displayed next to photographs of battery chickens, and piled bodies of Holocaust victims next to a pile of pig carcasses. Captions alleged that "like the Jews murdered in concentration camps, animals are terrorized when they are housed in huge filthy warehouses and rounded up for shipment to slaughter. The leather sofa and handbag are the moral equivalent of the lampshades made from the skins of people killed in the death camps." The exhibition was funded by an anonymous Jewish philanthropist, and created by Matt Prescott, who lost several relatives in the Holocaust. Prescott said that "what Jews and others went through in the Holocaust is what animals go through every day in factory farms".

The exhibition was criticized by Abraham Foxman, chairman of the ADL, who said the exhibition was "outrageous, offensive and takes chutzpah to new heights ... The effort by PETA to compare the deliberate systematic murder of millions of Jews to the issue of animal rights is abhorrent." Stuart Bender, legal counsel for the United States Holocaust Memorial Museum, wrote to PETA asking them to "cease and desist this reprehensible misuse of Holocaust materials." The campaign was also criticized by holocaust survivor Alex Hershaft, who has himself used the analogy to advocate for animal rights, but criticized PETA's campaign for making the comparison too lightly and recklessly, saying that "It's not O.K. for us. We wouldn't do it. The only reason I drew the comparison is because I was asked. And I did it very carefully, and I presented it in terms of my personal story, of the conclusions that I drew from my personal story. I didn't present it as an edict."

In 2005, Newkirk apologized for the pain the campaign had caused some people, while defending the goals of the campaign. The Guardian said Newkirk's comments "[did] little to calm the fury of Jewish groups". The campaign was also banned in Germany for making the Holocaust seem "insignificant and banal".

On February 20, 2009, the German Federal Constitutional Court dismissed a legal move challenging an appeal court's ruling that PETA's campaign was not protected by free speech laws. While not entering formal proceedings to decide in the matter, the court expressed severe doubts as to whether the campaign constituted an offense against human rights in its opinion to dismiss the appeal, as had been found by the orderly courts, but acceded to the other grounds of the former rulings that the campaign constituted a trivialization of the Holocaust and hence a severe violation of living Jews' personality rights.

== Criticism ==
=== Antisemitism ===
The ADL says that the use of Holocaust imagery by animal rights activists is "disturbing" and antisemitic. Roberta Kalechofsky of Jews for Animal Rights argues in her essay "Animal Suffering and the Holocaust: The Problem with Comparisons" that, although there is "connective tissue" between animal suffering and the Holocaust, they "fall into different historical frameworks, and comparison between them aborts the ... force of anti-Semitism." Holocaust survivor Abraham Silverman argued that the comparison is offensive, undermines the suffering of Jews during World War II, and inspires antisemitism online.

Alex Hershaft, who is a Jewish Holocaust survivor, has stated he does not take accusations of antisemitism seriously, adding: "The main criticism is that we're making light of the sacrifice of the Holocaust, and of course, we're not. Far from it. We're honoring it by trying to draw some lessons for humanity."

=== Comparability ===
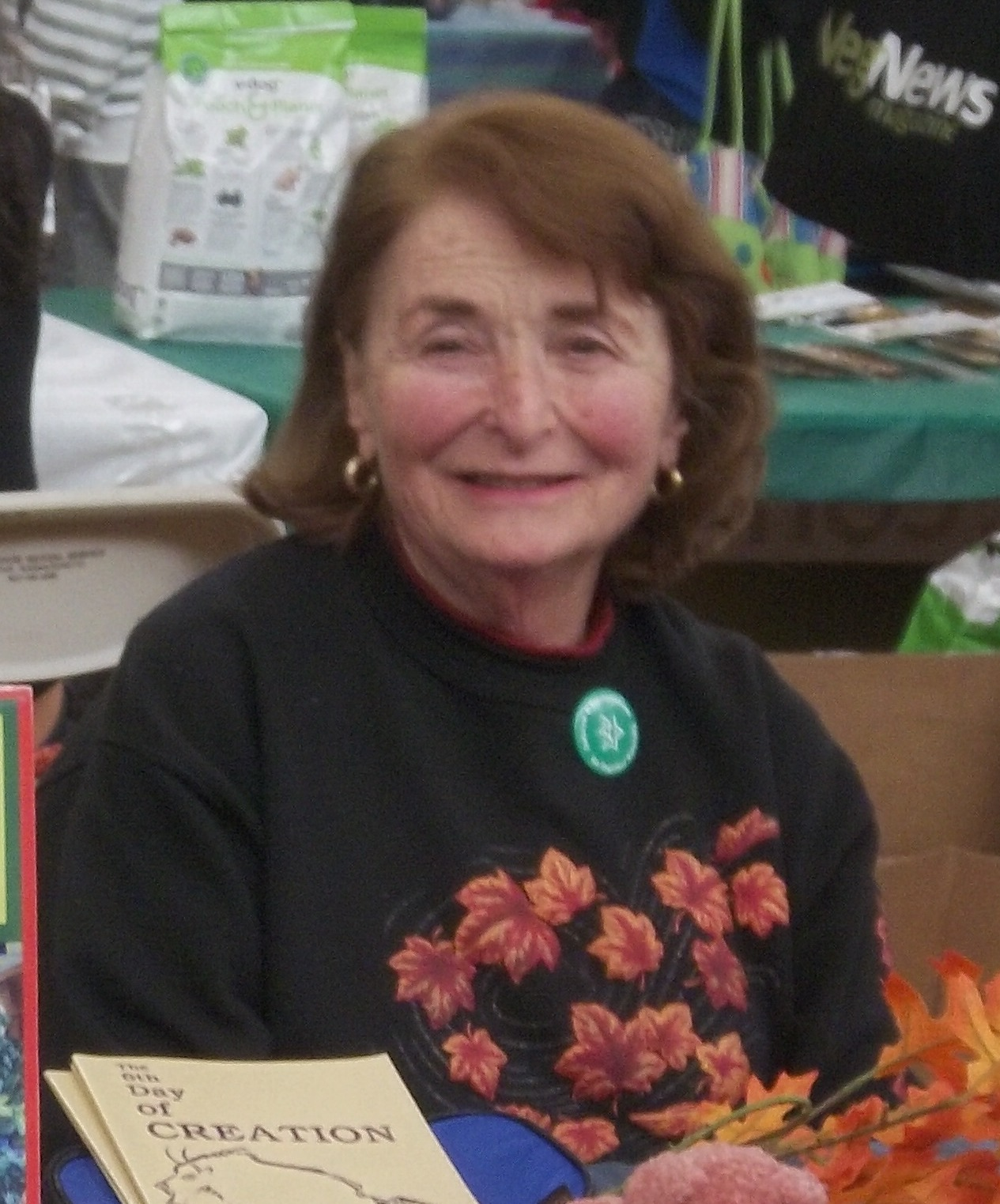
Roberta Kalechofsky, founder of Jews for Animal Rights and PETA member, criticized Holocaust analogies used by animal rights activists.

Roberta Kalechofsky has written that she "agree[s] with I.B. Singer's statement, that 'every day is Treblinka for the animals'", but also that "some agonies are too total to be compared with other agonies", and compared it to telling a dying child's parent: "Now you know how an animal feels."

=== Lack of human conflict with animals ===
Roberta Kalechofsky, a Jewish animal rights activist, wrote: "The agony of animals arises from different causes from those of the Holocaust. Human beings do not hate animals. They do not eat them because they hate them. They do not experiment on them because they hate them, they do not hunt them because they hate them. These were the motives for the Holocaust. Human beings have no ideological or theological conflict with animals."

In regards to the objection that, unlike the Holocaust, humans do not kill animals due to hatred, Alex Hershaft said: "I don't think hatred is the relevant thing here. I think indifference is the key factor. Because the people who were gassing the Jews were not doing it out of hatred. It was their job. They didn't hate the Jews any more than the slaughterhouse workers hate the pigs. It's not a matter of personal feelings. Obviously, Hitler had the hatred. I'm not saying that element doesn't exist. But it's not very relevant. The hatred alone wouldn't do it. You couldn't get these thousands of executioners to hate in the way that Hitler hated. If you look at the map of Treblinka, the guards and the commandant were living on the camp grounds. You can't live with people you hate. These were people to be killed and they were the killers."
