= Federation of Veterinarians of Europe =

The Federation of Veterinarians of Europe (FVE) is a non-profit umbrella organisation of veterinary organisations from 38 European countries. It was founded in 1975 and nowadays represents around 200,000 European veterinarians. The FVE strives to support veterinarians in delivering their professional responsibilities and representing the veterinary profession to the outside world. The FVE provides a platform for veterinarians across Europe to interact, to discuss and to develop position papers and professional guidelines. The current FVE motto is: "Veterinarians care for animals and people!" FVE publishes 4 times a year a newsletter which can be found on the FVE website.

== Structure ==
FVE is structured as follows: the representatives delegated by the national veterinary organisations meet twice a year, constituting the General Assembly. The General Assembly has the following powers: to define FVE policy, to approve the finances, to approve or exclude members or observers, to elect the new FVE Board and to control the activities of the Board. The FVE Board - consisting of a President, a Treasurer and three Vice Presidents - meets several times a year and defines the FVE position concerning veterinary issues (see “subjects”) and decides on long term programmes, i.e. strategies. Decisions taken by the Board are carried out by the FVE Secretariat, a permanent office which supervises the day-to-day activities of the FVE and reports to the Board. The Secretariat is located in Brussels, the heart of EU policy - and decision making, allowing the FVE to participate on an EU level and to react adequately and timely to relevant developments. Apart from its members the FVE hosts 4 specialised veterinary groups or Sections. Sections are European organisations representing vocational groups of the veterinary profession in Europe. They include: Practising Veterinarians (UEVP), Hygienists and Public Health Veterinarians (UEVH), Veterinarians working in Education, Veterinary Research and Industry (EVERI) and State Veterinary Officers (EASVO).

== Focus and tasks ==
The FVE considers that the main task of the veterinarian is to “care for animal health and welfare and veterinary public health”. In order to create the right conditions for the veterinarian to do so, the FVE formulated a number of priority subjects.

FVE efforts are focused on:

- One Health°
- Animal Health
- Animal Welfare
- Education
- Food Safety and Public Health
- Medicines
- Veterinary Profession

One Health concept is a worldwide strategy for expanding interdisciplinary collaborations and communications in all aspects of health care for humans, animals and the environment.

FVE published in 2006 and 2011 its strategic plan. To make use of the best available knowledge the FVE can call upon veterinary experts to play a key role in FVE decision making. These experts take part in a Working Group which are appointed to deal with a particular subject and during a defined period. Once formulated a position on a specific subject, this position needs to be disseminated to the members and the outside world. The FVE achieves this by means of a newsletter for its members and position papers and press releases for all interested parties. These publications are not only to be seen as notifications, but also as tools to assist and influence the decision making process by EU policy makers. This can be deduced from the FVE statement that: “One of the most important tasks for FVE is building up, improving and maintaining links and relationships with the key policy makers in the EU institutions in order to establish and maintain FVE's credibility as a serious player and to influence the decision making process in the EU.”

== Positions ==
On June 6, 2015, the FVE adopted a position paper in which it recommends the prohibition of the use of wild animals in traveling circuses.
