= Peter Gatenby (cricketer) =

Australian cricketer (born 1949)

Personal information
- Full name: Peter Robert Gatenby
- Born: 26 May 1949 (age 77); Launceston, Tasmania, Australia
- Batting: Right-handed
- Role: Wicket-keeper
- Relatives: David Gatenby (brother)

Domestic team information
- Years: Team
- 1971/72: Tasmania
- FC debut: 22 December 1971 Tasmania v World XI
- Last FC: 26 December 1971 Tasmania Combined XI v World XI
- Only LA: 14 November 1971 Tasmania v South Australia

Career statistics
| Competition | First-class | List A |
|---|---|---|
| Matches | 2 | 1 |
| Runs scored | 47 | 30 |
| Batting average | 11.75 | 30.00 |
| 100s/50s | 0/0 | 0/0 |
| Top score | 21 | 30 |
| Catches/stumpings | 1/0 | 0/0 |
- Source: CricketArchive, 15 August 2010

Peter Robert Gatenby (born 26 May 1949) is an Australian cricketer who played for Tasmania. He was a right-handed batsman and wicket-keeper who played in 1971. He was born at Launceston, Tasmania in 1949.
