= James Aspey =

Australian animal rights activist and lecturer

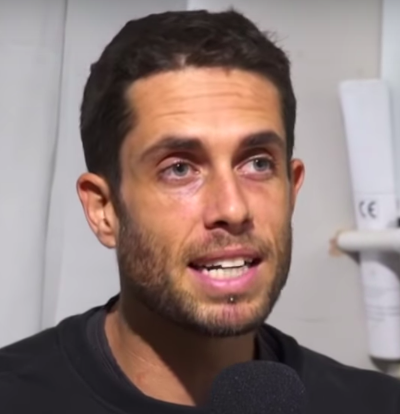
- Aspey in 2019
- Born: 10 November 1986 (age 39); Sydney, Australia
- Occupations: Fitness coach; social media influencer; activist
- Known for: Documenting a year-long vow of silence to raise awareness for animals

James Aspey (born 10 November 1986) is an Australian animal rights activist and vegan lecturer. He is best known for remaining silent for an entire year to raise awareness of animal cruelty in the food system.

== Personal life ==
James Aspey was born in Sydney, Australia. Aspey was diagnosed with leukaemia when he was 17, with his physicians telling him that he would live for just six weeks. However, he recovered and underwent chemotherapy for three years, during which time he started abusing drugs. Upon recovery, he became a personal trainer and started working on a cruise ship, travelling around the world giving lectures and hosting fitness classes on the ship. Seven years later, he tried becoming a vegetarian for a week on an experimental basis after having been told by an Indian traveler that "eating animals is bad karma". More analysis on vegetarianism eventually led him to veganism. He became vegan after learning that a plant-based diet could also be perfectly healthy and that he could no longer support the slaughter of animals. After taking a year long vow of silence, he travelled the world giving speeches, documenting slaughterhouses, filming debates on the streets and doing interviews. He currently lives in Bali with his wife, Nicole Aspey.

== Animal rights advocacy ==
Aspey traveled around Australia, writing a blog and cycling 5000 km from Darwin to Sydney "to raise awareness of the cruel ways in which humans currently exploit other animals for food, clothing, entertainment, and testing."

On 1 January 2014, Aspey pledged that he would not speak for 365 days as activism to protest and highlight animal cruelty.

On 13 January 2015, he broke his silence by giving a speech on television in the Australian morning show Sunrise in an interview viewed over 10 million times. He credited the idea of his silent protest as arising from his attendance at a Vipassana meditation centre, having abstained from speaking for ten days and meditating 10 hours each day. By 2017, he had given 150 free speeches.

In 2016, Aspey was tattooed continuously for 24 hours to raise money for three charities. His animal rights speech, which had gone viral, has been viewed over 6 million times.

In 2019, Aspey was a candidate for the Animal Justice Party in the New South Wales state election in the electorate of Heathcote, and was overseas from before his announcement, until after the election.

== See also ==
- List of vegans
- List of animal rights activists
