= Anonymous for the Voiceless =

Animal rights organization

- Abbreviation: AV
- Formation: April 16, 2016
- Type: Nonprofit organisation
- Purpose: Promoting animal rights and veganism
- Headquarters: Chiang Mai, Thailand
- Website: anonymousforthevoiceless.org

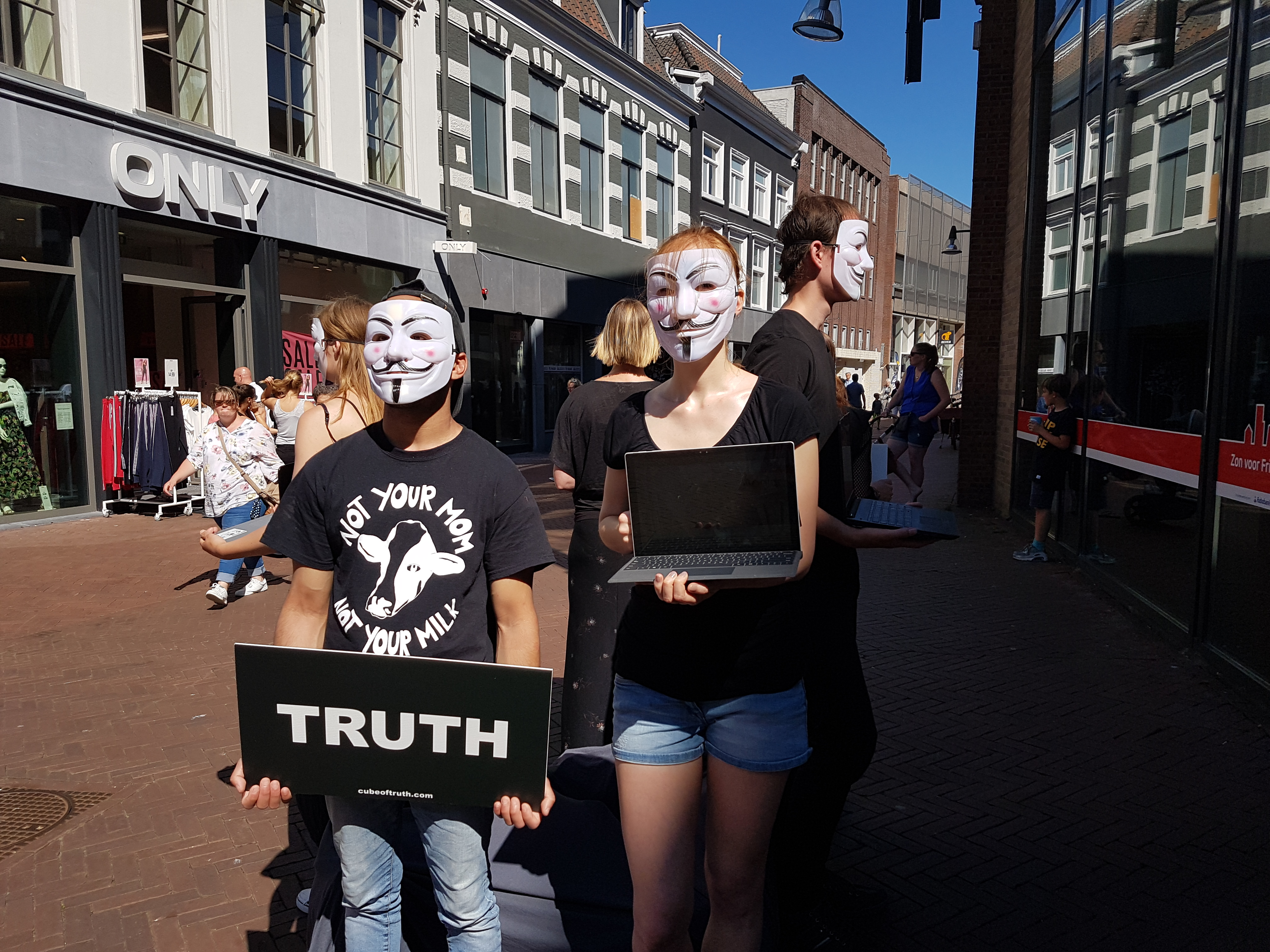
Anonymous for the Voiceless at a protest for veganism in the Netherlands, June 2018

Anonymous for the Voiceless (AV) is a grassroots animal rights organization formed in April 2016, in Melbourne, Australia. The organization specializes in street activism and operates worldwide. Anonymous for the Voiceless coordinates 100,000 volunteers in 375 AV chapters in 61 countries, with teams of volunteers organizing and staging peaceful protest actions called 'Cubes of Truth'. These protests involve volunteers standing in a square formation wearing Guy Fawkes masks while holding screens showing footage of standard practice in the animal agriculture industry with the intention of creating awareness and promoting the public to shift to a vegan lifestyle.

It is not affiliated to the hacktivist group "Anonymous", despite the similarities of names and the use of the Guy Fawkes mask.

== Cube of Truth ==
Cube of Truth in Cologne, 2026

The Cube of Truth is an outreach and education method in which a group of black-clad people wearing Guy Fawkes masks form a square facing outward while holding signs and video screens showing footage of inside slaughterhouses, farms, and vivisection labs. The cubes vary in size according to the number of activists or space. Unmasked members of AV, known as "outreachers", talk to people onlooking and encourage adopting a vegan lifestyle. The AV activists offer a 22-day vegan challenge called "Challenge 22" to onlookers who decide they want to take the option of a vegan diet.

== Campaigns ==
The Melbourne group's actions began in April 2016, to be followed by a Sydney group from November.

On 5 November 2016, AV held 200 Cube of Truth actions across the world on the same day for the first of the now annual 'International Cube Day' campaigns.

== Organization ==
While it has been claimed that AV is a grassroots effort with no central organizing force beyond a website that links to each chapter and a series of Facebook groups that coordinate events, the organisation does have a small team which includes the Co-Founders and Directors. This team is responsible for coordinating volunteers globally, providing chapters with essential equipment and support, running activist training programmes, and delivering impactful online campaigns.

Anonymous for the Voiceless holds an abolitionist stance on animal exploitation.

Paul Bashir and Asal Alamdari founded the original group in Melbourne, although its headquarters are now in Chiang Mai, Thailand.

== See also ==
- List of animal rights groups
