= Francis Brambell =

Irish medical scientist

- Brambell in 1954
- Born: 25 February 1901; Dublin, Ireland
- Died: 6 June 1970 (aged 69); London, England
- Education: Trinity College, Dublin (B.A., M.Sc., Ph.D.)
- Awards: Fellow of the Royal Society; Royal Medal (1964)
- Scientific career
- Workplaces: Bangor University mostly, but also University College London and King's College London
- Thesis: (1924)
- Doctoral advisor: James Brontë Gatenby

Francis William Rogers Brambell (25 February 1901 – 6 June 1970) was an Irish medical scientist who spent his professional working life in Britain.

== Education ==
Brambell was born in Sandycove, Dublin and was educated (1911–1914) at Aravon School and then privately, specializing in zoology. He entered Trinity College Dublin with an Entrance Prize in natural science. In 1920 Brambell won a Foundation Scholarship and in 1922 he graduated B.A. with Senior Moderatorship and gold medal in natural sciences, and was awarded a postgraduate Fellowship prize. During his first degree he was taught by some distinguished scientists including Professors Henry Horatio Dixon FRS, John Joly FRS, and James Brontë Gatenby. After graduation he worked in cytology under Professor James Brontë Gatenby, gained his BSc (subsequently transformed into MSc) in 1923, and his PhD in 1924 (this was the first PhD awarded by Trinity College Dublin). In 1924 he was awarded a Science Research Scholarship for the Exhibition of 1851. Owing to the formation of the Irish Free State, Irish graduates had become eligible for the overseas awards of the commission.

== Career ==
Brambell was appointed Lloyd Roberts Professor and Head of the Department of Zoology at Bangor University in 1930 at age 29 years. From that time until his retirement 38 years later, he brought great distinction to his Department and College. He was the father of the field of transmission of immunity. As part of his quantitative and temporal studies on transmission, he defined the first Fc receptor system for IgG, and furthermore recognized the link between transmission of passive immunity from mother to young and protection from catabolism via IgG.

Brambell wrote Antibodies and Embryos with W. A. Hemmings and M. Henderson in 1951.

At Bangor, Brambell taught Robert Edwards, who studied for his undergraduate degree in the Zoology Department there, and who later (together with Patrick Steptoe and Jean Purdy) developed IVF.

Brambell was elected a Fellow of the Royal Society in March, 1949 and won their Royal Medal in 1964 "In recognition of his important contribution to our understanding of the passage of protein from maternal to foetal circulations".

In 1965, Brambell led the UK governmental committee that authored The Five Freedoms, a document asserting the five essential freedom to guarantee quality of life for animals under human control.

The Brambell Laboratory at Bangor University, completed in 1971 and now a Grade II listed building, is named after him.

== Personal life ==
He died on 6 June 1970. He had married Margaret L. Adgie in 1927, with whom he had two children: Michael, who became Director of Chester Zoo, and Anne, the first Dean of Women Students at Trinity College Dublin.
