= James Brontë Gatenby =

New Zealand zoologist

James Brontë Gatenby (10 October 1892 – 20 July 1960) was a zoologist notable for his work on the structure of cells and the Golgi bodies.

== Background ==
Gatenby was born in Wanganui, New Zealand. He progressed from St. Patrick's College in Wellington to Jesus College, Oxford. In 1916, he graduated with a first-class degree in zoology. He remained at Oxford until 1919, first as a demonstrator in forest zoology and human embryology, then as a lecturer in histology in 1917. In 1918 he became a 'senior demy' (that is, recipient of a graduate scholarship) of Magdalen College, Oxford. He was the first recipient of a DPhil at Oxford University, which was conferred on 11 March 1920.

In 1915, during World War I, Gatenby was 'at the front in France' but was recalled to finish his medical studies at Oxford.

Gatenby left Oxford in 1919 for a post at University College, London. He was appointed there as the senior assistant in zoology and comparative anatomy. In 1920, he was made a lecturer in cytology. In 1921, he moved to Trinity College, Dublin. He was appointed professor of zoology and comparative anatomy at Trinity College, Dublin, in 1921. He became the professor of cytology. In 1922, Gatenby married Enid "Molly" Meade and they had four children, including the medical director of the UN, Peter Gatenby. After Molly's death in 1950, he married Constance Harris. He was related to the Brontë family.

== Career ==
Gatenby produced original research on many insects and the structure of their cells. His most important work was studying Golgi bodies in various animals, including humans.

He published:

- Biological Laboratory Technique by James Brontë Gatenby (1937)
- Microtomist's Vade-Mecum by Arthur Bolles Lee, James Brontë Gatenby and Edmund Vincent Cowdry (1928)

And also published was: In memoriam James Brontë Gatenby. By E. T. Freeman, Irish journal of medical science, p. 437, September, 1960, September, 1960
