= Peter Gatenby (doctor) =

Irish doctor and professor

Peter Barry Brontë Gatenby (1923 – 24 August 2015 in Sandycove, County Dublin) was an Irish medical doctor, Medical Director for the United Nations and Professor of Medicine at Trinity College Dublin. He was Ireland's first full-time professor of clinical medicine.

== Family ==
Gatenby was the son of the zoologist James Brontë Gatenby and was related to the Brontë family. He had a wife, Yvette, two children, Robin and Odette, and six grandchildren.

== Career ==
Gattenby earned a bachelors in medicine degree in Trinity College in 1946. Following graduation he worked in a number of hospitals in Ireland and the UK. From 1953 to 1974, he worked as a consultant physician at Dr Steevens' Hospital. In 1960, he became the first full time professor of clinical medicine in Trinity College Dublin, becoming a fellow in 1965. In 1974, he also became Medical Director for the United Nations. From 1975 to 1978, he was Regius Professor of Physic, and was made an honorary fellow when he resigned in 1978. He continued at the United Nations until his retirement in 1987.

In 2002, the Peter Gatenby Award was founded at Trinity College Dublin.

== Works ==
- The school of physic: Trinity College Dublin : a retrospective view, 1994
- History of the Meath Hospital, 1996
