= Animal Welfare Committee =

UK independent advisory body

The Animal Welfare Committee (AWC) is an independent advisory body established by the Government of the United Kingdom as the Farm Animal Welfare Committee in 2011, its name was changed to Animal Welfare Committee in 2019. It replaced the Farm Animal Welfare Council which was an independent advisory body established in 1979. The Council published its Final Report before its closure and replacement on 31 March 2011.

== Farm Animal Welfare Council ==
The Farm Animal Welfare Council terms of reference were to keep under review the welfare of farm animals on agricultural land, at market, in transit and at the place of slaughter and advise Government of any changes that may be necessary. The council comprised various Standing Committees and Working Groups that consulted widely and openly about the issues FAWC considered relevant to the welfare of farmed animals and to prepare recommendations for the council's consideration. Once agreed, the recommendations formed the basis for advice given to Government. Copies of FAWC's Reports and other advice are available on the FAWC website.

The council's major strength lay in its independence to investigate any topic falling within its remit and to communicate freely with outside bodies, including the European Commission and the public, while maintaining the independence to publish its advice.

The council also established the Five Freedoms for farm animals. These freedoms serve as a basic outline for regulations concerning livestock, poultry, etc.

The chairwoman appointed in 1999, Judy MacArthur Clark, told Parliament that

We are a council of just over 20 individuals. We are appointed by the Minister but we are appointed in an independent capacity. We do not represent any bodies other than our own opinions and the membership is very wide ranging. We have farmers on board; we have veterinarians, such as myself; we have people who represent the slaughter industry; we have animal welfarists; we have consumers. It is a very widespread membership intended to look at farm animal welfare from the perspective of the entire public view.

== See also ==
- 2010 Nocton Dairies controversy
