= List of animal rights groups =

This list of animal rights groups consists of groups in the animal rights movement. Such animal rights groups work towards their ideals, which include the viewpoint that animals should have equivalent rights to humans, such as not being "used" in research, food, clothing and entertainment industries, and seek to end the status of animals as property. (Cf. Animal welfare.)

This list contains only groups, organizations and leaderless resistance networks that have articles within Wikipedia.

== Organizations ==
=== General animal rights ===
- Animal Aid (UK)
- Animal Defenders International
- Animal Defense League
- Animal Ethics
- Animal Justice (Canada)
- Animal Justice Project (UK)
- Animal Legal Defense Fund
- Animal Liberation Leagues
- Animal Liberation Press Office
- Animal Outlook (formerly Compassion Over Killing)
- Animal Protection and Rescue League
- Animal Rights Cambridge
- Animal Welfare Network Nepal
- AnimaNaturalis (Spain and Latin America)
- Animals Now
- Anonymous for the Voiceless
- Best Friends Animal Society
- Captive Animals Protection Society
- Coalition to Abolish the Fur Trade (CAFT)
- Comunidad Inti Wara Yassi
- Direct Action Everywhere (DxE)
- Equanimal
- Farm Animal Rights Movement (FARM)
- Friends of Animals (FoA)
- HAYTAP
- In Defense of Animals (IDA)
- International Primate Protection League (IPPL)
- Italian Horse Protection Association (IHP)
- L214
- Last Chance for Animals (LCA)
- Libera!
- Massachusetts Animal Rights Coalition (MARC)
- Mercy For Animals (MFA)
- No Kill Advocacy Center (NKAC)
- Nonhuman Rights Project
- People for the Ethical Treatment of Animals (PETA)
- People for Animals (PFA)
- Save Animals From Exploitation (SAFE)
- Western Animal Rights Network (WARN)
- Uncaged Campaigns

=== Focused on animal testing ===
- American Anti-Vivisection Society (AAVS)
- Animal Free Research UK
- Anti-Vivisection Coalition (AVC)
- Center for Alternatives to Animal Testing (CAAT)
- Cruelty Free International
- Great Ape Project
- Iranian Anti-Vivisection Association (IAVA)
- New England Anti-Vivisection Society
- Physicians Committee for Responsible Medicine (PCRM)
- Primate Freedom Project
- Rocky Mountain Animal Defense
- SPEAK
- Uncaged Campaigns

=== Focused on bloodsports ===
- CAS International
- Hunt Saboteurs Association (HSA)

=== Focused on farmed animals ===
- Compassion in World Farming
- Farm Sanctuary
- L214
- Mercy for Animals
- United Poultry Concerns (UPC)
- Factory Farming Awareness Coalition

=== Focused on speciesism ===
- Animal Ethics

=== Vegan or vegetarian-oriented groups ===
- Christian Vegetarian Association
- Every Animal
- Liberation BC
- Vegan Outreach
- Vegan Society
- Vegetarian Society
- Veggies Catering Campaign
- Viva!

=== Wild animals ===
- Animal Ethics
- Wild Animal Initiative

=== Meta ===
- Animal Charity Evaluators

== Leaderless resistance networks ==
- Animal Liberation Front (ALF)
- Animal Rights Militia (ARM)
- Direct Action Everywhere (DxE)
- Justice Department (JD)
- Lobster Liberation Front (LLF)
- Oxford Arson Squad
- Revolutionary Cells - Animal Liberation Brigade (RCALB)
- Western Animal Rights Network (WARN)

=== Support groups ===
These groups, though not directly animal rights groups, predominantly operate as aboveground support functions for underground animal rights activities or activists.

- Arkangel
- Animal Liberation Front Supporters Group (ALFSG UK)
- Animal Liberation Press Office
- Bite Back
- Earth Liberation Prisoner Support Network (ELPSN)

== Defunct groups ==
The following entries represent groups, organizations and leaderless networks that have closed, disbanded, or ended because their goals were reached. Autonomous campaigns unclaimed by any other group may also be listed here, but not campaigns claimed by a group or leaderless network that is already on the list.

- Calf 269 (269)
- Campaign against Highgate Rabbit Farm
- Humanitarian League
- No Compromise
- Save the Shamrock Monkeys
- Stop Huntingdon Animal Cruelty (SHAC)

== See also ==
- Animal rights
- Animal welfare
- List of animal rights advocates
- List of animal advocacy parties
- List of animal welfare groups
- List of environmental organizations
