= Krajnc =

Krajnc is a Slovene surname, the 4th most frequent in Slovenia. It's a common abbreviation of Kranjec, which means a person from Carniola, the central region of Slovenia. It's typical of eastern Slovenia: almost 85% of Slovenians with this surnames live in the traditional regions of Slovenian Styria, Prekmurje and Slovenian Carinthia. It's the most common surname in the Maribor region and the second most common surname in Slovenian Carinthia and in the Celje region. Notable people with the surname include:

- Alen Krajnc (born 1995), Slovene footballer
- Anita Krajnc, Canadian animal rights activist
- Armand Krajnc (born 1973), Swedish boxer
- Luka Krajnc (born 1994), Slovene footballer

== Related surnames ==
Another version of the same name are Kranjc and Kranjec. In north-eastern Italy, the surname has been frequently Italianized to Crainz, while in southern Austria, it has been Germanized to Krainz, Kraintz, Kreinz or Greinz.
