= Roger Yates =

English animal rights activist

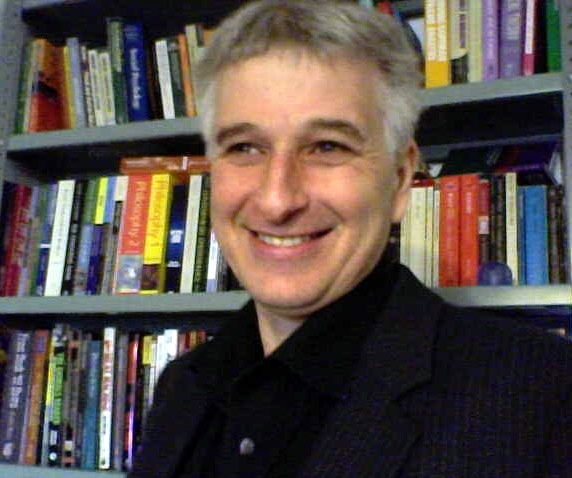
- Born: 7 August 1957 (age 69)
- Education: PhD in sociology
- Alma mater: University of Wales, Bangor
- Occupation: Lecturer
- Employer(s): University College Dublin; University of Wales
- Known for: Animal rights advocacy
- Website: Animal Rights Violations.

Roger Yates (born 7 August 1957) is an English lecturer in sociology at University College Dublin and the University of Wales, specialising in animal rights. He is a former executive committee member of the British Union for the Abolition of Vivisection (BUAV), a former Animal Liberation Front (ALF) press officer, and a co-founder of the Fur Action Group.

Yates was sentenced to four years' imprisonment in 1987 for conspiracy to commit criminal damage on behalf of the ALF. He absconded during the trial, and was on the run for two years, before being apprehended and serving his sentence. After his release in 1990, he began an academic study of animal protectionism and social movements, obtaining his PhD in 2005 on the subject of human/non-human relations. His current work focuses on the social transmission of speciesism. Yates maintains a blog on his web site, On Human Relations with Other Sentient Beings, and often co-hosts pro-intersectional podcasts with Carolyn Bailey of Animal Rights Zone (ARZone.)

== Activism ==
=== BUAV, Merseyside Animal Rights ===
Yates became involved in the British animal rights movement in 1979, following a false start two years earlier when he joined the Hunt Saboteurs Association (HSA), but failed to find fellow "sabs" near Scunthorpe, Lincolnshire. By 1979 he had moved to Essex and had become active as a vegan animal rights advocate.

He was one of a group of activists associated with the Animal Liberation Front Supporters Group (ALF SG), who tried in the early 1980s to gain control of the British Union for the Abolition of Vivisection, a group founded in 1898. Yates became a member of the BUAV's executive committee in 1982, along with Dave McColl, a director of Sea Shepherd Conservation Society, and they used the position to radicalise the organisation, which meant that significant campaigning funds became available to activists for the first time. He co-founded the Fur Action Group with others from the BUAV, and created the largest data bank on fur-bearing animals in the country, later handed over to the Lynx anti-fur organisation.

Kim Stallwood, BUAV's national organiser from 1981 to 1986, writes that the ALF activists who wanted to take over the BUAV believed all political action to be a waste of time, and wanted the group to devote its resources to direct action. The BUAV had been supportive of the ALF, and had allowed the ALF SG to use free office space in the BUAV's London offices, but in 1984 the board reluctantly voted to expel the ALF SG and to withdraw its political support from the ALF.

Yates moved to Liverpool to become a main organiser of the Merseyside Animal Rights Committee, along with Hunt Saboteur Association co-ordinators Dave and Fiona Callender. He helped with the HSA's annual campaigns against the Waterloo Cup hare coursing event and the Northern grouse shoot sabotages, and joined the Merseyside Sea Shepherd's campaigns against seal killing in the Orkney Islands. He also devised the "fur pledge" campaign targeting Manchester-based furrier, Edelson Furs, which had a number of franchises in large department stores; the pledge involved members of the public vowing to boycott entire stores while they had fur departments. He initiated public showings of videos such as Victor Schonfeld's The Animals Film, and opened and ran the first "Animal Rights Shop" in Liverpool City centre, selling merchandise from a range of national animal protection organisations. Throughout this period, Merseyside activists were active members of the Northern Animal Liberation League (NALL), culminating in a daylight raid on ICI in Alderley Park, Cheshire, involving 300 activists.

=== ALF press officer ===
In 1983 Ronnie Lee, the co-founder and national press liaison officer of the ALF SG, asked Yates to act as the organisation's northern press officer. This coincided with a dramatic change in ALF activity from direct rescue of animals to committing acts of economic sabotage, and in the government and police response to direct action. During this period, homes for animals rescued by animal liberationists were drying up, so Yates founded the Rescued Animals Sanctuary Fund.

In February 1987, he was one of 12 defendants convicted at Sheffield Crown Court, including three ALF SG press officers, after police raided a house in which they found evidence that incendiary devices were being created from fire lighters, batteries, and broken light bulbs. Similar devices hidden inside cigarette packets had been used in fur stores and department stores selling fur throughout England and Scotland, with the intention of setting off the sprinkler systems. Yates was sentenced to four years' imprisonment for conspiracy to cause criminal damage, while Ronnie Lee received a ten-year term. Lee's sentence coincided with the jailing for six and seven years of two defendants in the Ealing Vicarage rape case—where two men raped a woman in front of her boyfriend and father, who were badly beaten—prompting Conservative MP Steven Norris to declare in 1987 that, "sentencing at the moment seems to suggest that a woman's body is less valuable than property or the right of experimenters and mink farmers to live in peace."

Yates absconded during his trial and spent three years on the run. He writes: "While we were getting to the end of the trial our barristers told us that Ronnie [Lee] could expect something like 16 years in jail and the 'lieutenants' in the case, such as Brendan, Vivian Smith and myself, might get 10 years each. I was the only defendant with children at the time and I realised we were talking about most of their school years...." While on the run, he helped launch the Federation of Local Animal Rights Groups.

Yates was arrested in north Wales in 1989 after a bomb exploded in the Senate House bar of Bristol University, an act claimed by the "Animal Abuse Society," an unknown group. The attack was followed by a series of car bomb attacks. Yates became a leading suspect in the Bristol attack. His mug shot was widely distributed and he was arrested within three weeks. He appealed to activists from his prison cell in a statement to The Guardian that they take no life-threatening action, in line with ALF policy. The car-bomb attacks continued, claimed by the "British Animal Rights Society," another unknown group. After a nail bomb attack on a Land Rover, the car's owner, a huntsman, was charged with having blown up his own car. He was jailed for nine months, reportedly telling the court that he had done it to discredit the animal rights movement.

=== Vegan Ireland, Animal Education Outreach, Animal Rights Month ===
Yates is a co-founder and the Press Officer of Vegan Ireland: The Vegan Society of Ireland and a representative of Animal Education Outreach, which gives talks about animal use and treatment to Irish schools and colleges. 2010 was a busy media year for Vegan Ireland, with Yates taking part in numerous events, conferences, meetings and media interviews on their behalf.

While working on his Ph.D. at the University of Wales, Yates began public events called Animal Rights Month; for example "Animal Rights November" in 2000. He has continued such events in Ireland, organising "Animal Rights July" in 2009 and "Animal Rights November" in 2010. The latter features professors Gary L. Francione and Robert Garner discussing themes from their 2010 book, The Animal Rights Debate: Abolition or Regulation.

== The Vegan Information Project ==
In 2013, Yates co-founded The Vegan Information Project (VIP), which describes itself as, "Intersectional Vegan Education Unchained. Street & public events: stalls, pay-to-view, workshops and lectures. School talks. Media." In a radio interview, Yates said that he have left Vegan Ireland because he had a different vision of the future of the vegan movement.

The VIP held a 16-week residency in Temple Bar, Dublin, which ended as World Vegan Month 2013 began in November. The group ran a weekly "mini-course" on social movements, from November 2013 to May 2014, which featured weekly lectures, workshops, film shows, and seminars.

There are several "new" features to VIP's advocacy, from its "mould breaking" stalls, to its pro-intersectional vision of veganism as an-embracing liberation struggle. Vegan pro-intersectionality is a justice campaign that includes struggles against speciesism, racism, ableism, sexism, etc.

The VIP publish end-of-the-year review videos, which are available on their Home page and includes videos from 2013 to 2017.

== Academic work ==
Yates focuses on the social transmission of speciesism, and how and why modern human societies exploit and harm animals. He has called for a strategic audit of the animal protection movement. As part of the abolitionist approach to animal rights, and inspired by the writing of Gary L. Francione, he makes a "plea for a philosophical animal rights stance." Francione's abolitionist critique of the property status of animals is reflected in Yates's investigations in 2001 into horse maiming, or "horse ripping."

A recurring theme in his work is the exploration of the so-called "movement-countermovement dialectic" involving social movements and their opponents as claims-makers. Piers Beirne and N. South write that Yates explores the "extent to which the general public, pet owners, dog show advocates, and other 'pro-use' interests, learn and recycle countermovement message(s) about the theories of change and their advocates. Do the arguments laid out by the countermovements act as 'scripts' to aid those who oppose the ideas of the pro-animal movement?"

Commenting on his "Rituals of Dominionism in Human-Nonhuman Relations: Bullfighting to Hunting, Circuses to Petting," Richard White writes that Yates "skilfully develops a persuasive critique which seeks to contextualise the powerful role of social rituals in shaping humans' speciesist relationships with other animals." In 2010, Yates published a paper on "Language, Power and Speciesism" which was critical of the failure, in his view, of the animal protection movement to adequately challenge "the dominant language forms of human-nonhuman relations." In 2011, Yates turned his attention to criminalisation processes, placing Ireland in a global context.

His MA thesis was an examination of the British animal protection movement, and his 2005 PhD dissertation, "The Social Construction of Human Beings and Other Animals in Human-Nonhuman Relations. Welfare and Rights: A Contemporary Sociological Analysis," was a work of non-speciesist zemiology. He maintains two blogs, "On Human Relations with Other Sentient Beings," a sociological exploration of speciesism, and "On Human-Nonhuman Relations Podcasts," and, until 2012, helped administrate the global social movement network Animal Rights Zone (ARZone) which encourages rational discourse within the animal advocacy movement and invites prime movers of the movement, such as Dr. Will Tuttle, Dr. Melanie Joy, Professor Gary Francione and Captain Paul Watson, for live Q&A "chats" with ARZone members which are then transcribed and published on the site. Yates has teamed back up with ARZone for a series of pro-intersectional podcasts, which are made in association with VegFestUK.

Yates' most recent book chapter, "The Business of Revolution is Counterrevolutionary," features in Volume Two of Animal Oppression and Capitalism (2017), edited by sociologist David Nibert. Yates is a long-time critic of the "reducetarian" turn in animal advocacy. Writing in the "Afterword" of this volume, John Sorenson writes, "In this book, Roger Yates criticizes the shallowness that charactierizes some of the nonhuman animal advocacy movement. None of the large, conservative nonhuman animal organizations are willing to undertake the necessary structural analysis, but instead they solicit donations for their efforts to ameliorate some of the most egregious forms of abuse while maintaining partnerships with the very industries that perpetuate those abuses on a regular basis," and editor David Nibert writes (in the introduction in Vol One): "Yates astutely argues that efforts towards the outright abolition of oppression of human and other animals have become lost 'in modern-day consumerism and shallow celebrity culture,' and that activists must recognize and challenge the structural roots of oppression and the capitalist system in order to overcome oppression."

== See also ==
- Green criminology
- List of animal rights advocates

== Selected works ==
- "Criminalizing protests about animal abuse: Recent Irish experience in global context," in Crime, Law and Social Change 55 (2011): 469-82.
- "Language, Power and Speciesism" in Critical Society, no. 3 (2010).
- "Rituals of Dominionism in Human-Nonhuman Relations" in Journal for Critical Animal Studies, 7, no. 1 (2009).
- "Debating animal rights online" in Beirne, Piers and South, Nigel. Issues in Green Criminology. Willan Publishing, 2007.
- "A Movement Toward a Movement for Animal Rights?", Arkangel, 2006.
- "Fowl Play," Arkangel, guest editorial, 2006.
- Yates, Roger (2017, July 10). “The Social Construction of Human Beings and Other Animals in Human-Nonhuman Relations.” RogerYatesPhD (blog). https://rogeryatesphd.blogspot.ie/ (accessed November 13, 2025).
- With Powell, Chris and Piers Beirne, "Horse Maiming in the English Countryside," Society & Animals 9, no. 1 (2001): 1-23. doi:10.1163/156853001300108964.
- "Welfare Woes and Political Problems," Arkangel 23 (2000): 16–20.
- "Are the Animal Rights Militia Genuine?" Forum. Nottingham: Veggies Catering Campaign, 1999.
- "A Strategic Audit for Animal Rights," Uncaged 21 (March–May 1999): 16–17.
