= IAVA =

IAVA may refer to:

- Information Assurance Vulnerability Alert
- Instituto Alfredo Vásquez Acevedo
- Iranian Anti-Vivisection Association
- Iraq and Afghanistan Veterans of America
