= Death of Regan Russell =

2020 death of animal rights protester in Canada

- Still from surveillance footage of the transport truck approaching where Russell was standing at the entrance of the slaughterhouse premises, approximately one second before she was run over.
- Date: June 19, 2020
- Time: 10:22 a.m. (EDT; UTC−04:00)
- Location: Burlington, Ontario, Canada; 43°22′44.4″N 79°45′56.3″W
- Type: Traffic fatality
- Perpetrator: Andrew Blake
- Convictions: Careless driving causing death
- Sentence: CA$2000 fine 12 months' probation

On June 19, 2020, 65-year-old Canadian animal rights activist and protester Regan Russell was run over and killed by the driver of a livestock transport truck after a demonstration outside Sofina Foods Inc. subsidiary Fearman's Pork Inc., a pig slaughterhouse in Burlington, Ontario. The driver of the truck was convicted of careless driving causing death.

== Background ==
Regan Russell
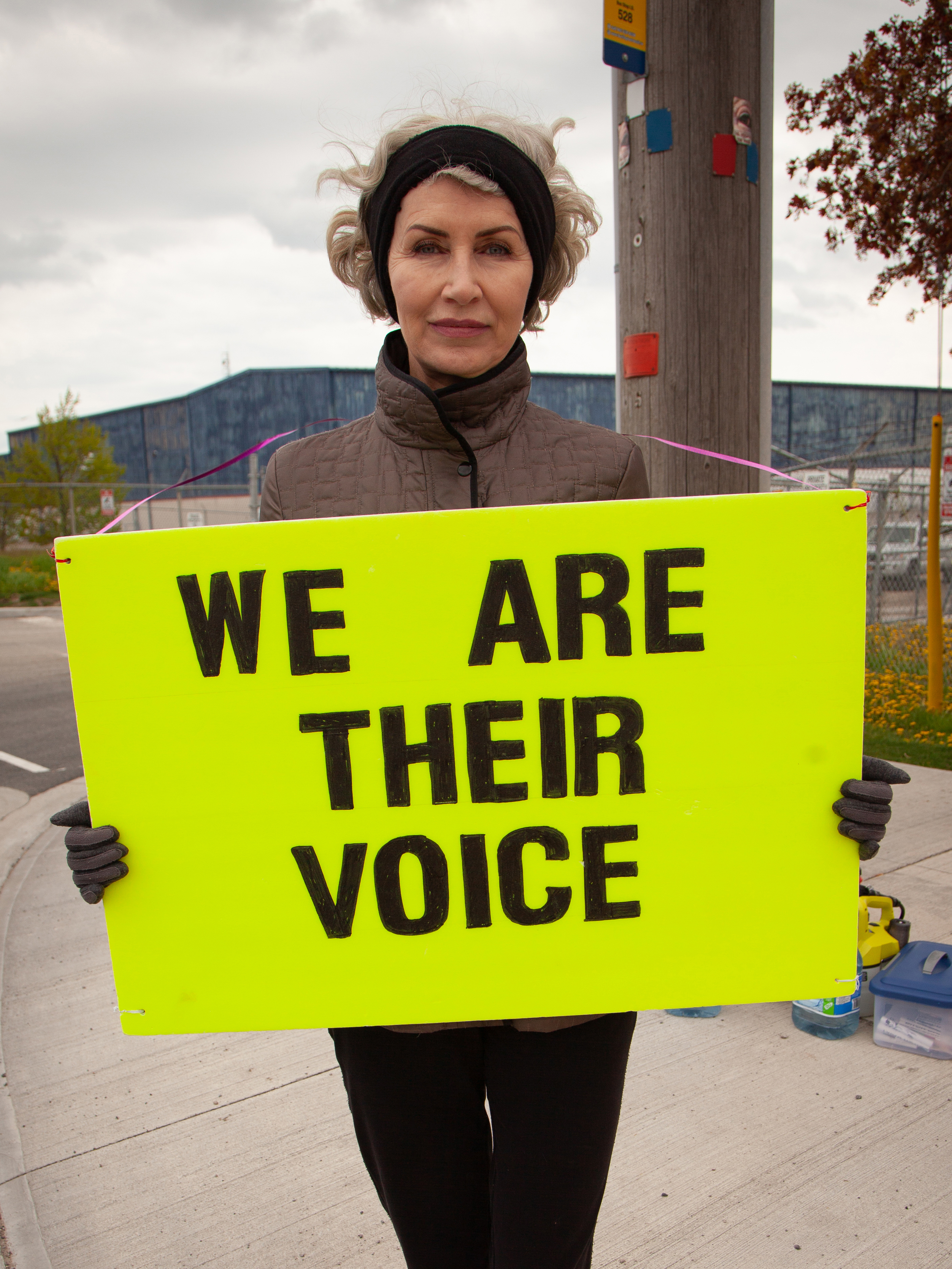
- Russell protesting outside Fearman's Pork slaughterhouse in November 2019, metres from where she would eventually be fatally run over by a pig transporter.
- Born: Regan Lydia Russell; April 6, 1955; Hamilton, Ontario, Canada
- Died: June 19, 2020 (aged 65); Burlington, Ontario, Canada
- Occupation: Animal rights activist
- Years active: 1979–2020
- Awards: Dr. Jean Rumny Award (2020; posthumously awarded)

Russell, a woman from Hamilton, Ontario, began to campaign for animal rights when she was 24 years old, with her first protest against seal culling taking place outside a government building in Winnipeg. In 1985, she read Animal Liberation: A New Ethics for Our Treatment of Animals and became a vegan. Russell was also an advocate for Black Lives Matter and women's rights. Filmed in 2012 while protesting against Marineland, Russell said, "People say we’re breaking the law by storming. How do you think women got the right? How do you think slavery was abolished? People stood up and broke the laws—because they're stupid laws." Russell was a member of Toronto Pig Save, a branch of the animal rights organization Animal Save Movement, which frequently organised demonstrations outside Canada's oldest pig slaughterhouse, Fearman's Pork Inc. in Burlington, a subsidiary of Sofina Foods Inc., owned by Michael Latifi. These demonstrations involved activists standing in front of the entrance to the premises, requesting a truck driver transporting pigs to the slaughterhouse to wait outside the entrance for two minutes and filming themselves giving water to the slaughter-bound pigs through holes in the trailer. On June 18, 2020, the Legislative Assembly of Ontario granted royal assent to a bill known as the Security from Trespass and Protecting Food Safety Act. A section of the bill, which would come into effect in September of the same year, would illegalize interference with animal transport without the consent of the transport truck drivers.

== Death and legal proceedings ==
In the morning of June 19, 2020, Russell and six other activists from Toronto Pig Save held a pig-watering demonstration outside Fearman's Pork slaughterhouse. The entrance of the premises is located southeast of the intersection of South Service Road and Harvester Road in Burlington. One truck carrying pigs approached the premises at 10:17 a.m., stopping in the inner lane of the roadway on Harvester Road, southwest of the intersection, just before the right turn onto the premises. At 10:19, four of the activists walked from where they were standing in front of the entrance to where the truck had stopped and began watering the pigs in the trailer. At this point, the truck driver called 911 and was advised by the operator to stay in the truck and not move. At 10:21, two of the other activists walked to the trailer while Russell walked in the other direction and stepped onto the nearest sidewalk to allow a supply truck onto the premises. The activists finished watering the pigs less than a minute later, at which point the truck began to make the right turn into the driveway. Russell stepped back into the driveway and stood in the truck's path, making a peace sign with her hand to the driver. The truck proceeded to drive through the entrance at about 20.5 kilometres per hour (12.7 mph), running over Russell and killing her instantly, and dragging her body several yards as a security guard gestured for the driver to stop.

After an investigation, Andrew Blake was charged with the Highway Traffic Act offence of careless driving causing death, with authorities stating there was no indication of intent or crime in his action. In March 2023, he pleaded guilty to the charge and was sentenced to 12 months' probation—the conditions of which restricted his permission to operate a vehicle—and ordered to pay a fine of CA$2,000 (equivalent to $2,090 in 2025).

== Aftermath ==
Animal rights activists from around the world dedicated actions to Russell's memory, including die-ins outside the High Commission of Canada in London, England, a sit-in outside a slaughterhouse in Atena Lucana, Italy, a march and rally requesting justice for Russell in downtown Toronto, and a food drive in Mumbai, India. A demonstration in California was attended by Joaquin Phoenix, who later joined other animal rights activists in a protest outside Fearman's Pork slaughterhouse. Speaking of Russell, Phoenix said, "While her tragic death has brought upon deep sorrow in the Animal Save community, we will honour her memory by vigorously confronting the cruelties she fought so hard to prevent by marching with Black Lives, protecting Indigenous rights, fighting for LGBTQ equality, and living a compassionate vegan life." On July 30, 2020, a pig-watering demonstration outside Fearman's Pork slaughterhouse was interrupted by counter-protesters, who tried to prevent the activists from giving water to pigs and held signs with derogatory references to Russell. Russell's death also became an issue in the protests and counter protests in Niagara-on-the-Lake about the use of horse-drawn carriages.

The Society for the Prevention of Cruelty to Animals's Hamilton/Burlington branch posthumously awarded Russell the Dr. Jean Rumny Award for commitment and dedication to animals. Activist Varun Virlan released a short film about Russell titled Killed For Compassion, which was shown at the 2020 International Vegan Film Festival. Shaun Monson, director of Earthlings, released a documentary about Russell titled There Was a Killing.

In March 2021, the Canadian advocacy group Animal Justice sued the Ontario government over the Security from Trespass and Protecting Food Safety Act. In June 2022, Russell's widower filed a lawsuit against the truck driver and the companies involved in the incident.

In November 2023, footage of the incident recorded by a surveillance camera at Fearman's Pork slaughterhouse was publicly released.

== See also ==
- Anita Krajnc case
- Death of Jill Phipps
- List of animal rights advocates
