= Libera! =

Spanish animal rights organization

- Founded: 2004
- Purpose: Animal rights
- Location: Barcelona
- Region served: International
- Method: Education, demonstrations, protest actions, complaints and animal rescues
- Website: www.liberaong.org

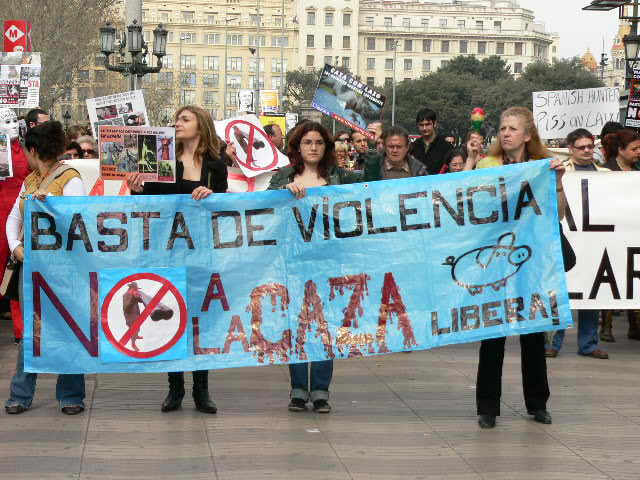
Libera! activists in a demonstration against hunting, Barcelona

Libera! is an international non-profit animal rights organization. Among other actions, it carries out education and public-awareness campaigns. Libera! was founded in 2004 in Barcelona. The group's initial actions focused on Barcelona. Catalonia (Spain), but the group gradually transformed into an international organisation. At the moment, it has delegations too in Argentina, Uruguay, and Ecuador.

One of its campaigns reached international media was the campaign Libera a Susi (Spanish: "Free Susi"). This campaign aimed to free the only elephant at the Barcelona Zoo, an African elephant named Susi, who according to Libera! and the British organisation Born Free Foundation, suffered from severe psychological problems resulting from loneliness. Libera! aims to move Susi to an elephant sanctuary, where she could live in better and freer conditions in the company of other elephants.

This campaign has received support from the world of culture. José Saramago (a winner of the Nobel Prize for Literature), Queen Sofía, and personalities in Barcelona municipal politics, such as Imma Mayol, have endorsed the campaign. Libera! conducted this campaign with the support of the Fundación Faada and the Born Free Foundation.

Libera!, together with Fundación FAADA, formed the Plataforma Rambles Ètiques, which campaigns to ensure that, in compliance with the Animal Protection Act 22/2003 and the Ordinance on the Protection of Animals, the Barcelona City Council stops the sale of animals in the traditional bird shops of La Rambla. In media campaigns, the Plataforma Rambles Ètiques denounced both the conditions in which the birds live and the practice of throwing away the bodies of the animals that die (though the practice is not legally allowed to threaten public health). As the campaign has pointed out, the shopkeepers have also thrown living animals in the trash.

Along with the Platform SOS Stop Our Shame and CAS International, Libera! is a co-ordinator of the Plataforma Galicia Mellor Sen Touradas, which aims to abolish bull fighting in Galicia. This campaign has the support of environmental Galician organizations including ADEGA and Matar por matar non.

In March 2009, Libera! brought a lawsuit against the former minister Mariano Fernández Bermejo for the crime of poaching without a license in February that year with the judge of the Audiencia Nacional, Baltasar Garzón, when Bermejo was still minister of justice. Spain’s Justice Minister Mariano Fernandez Bermejo resigned on Monday after a hunting trip he shared with a prominent judge investigating opposition party members became an issue in regional elections.

== See also ==
- List of animal rights groups
