= Burcu Güneş =

Turkish singer

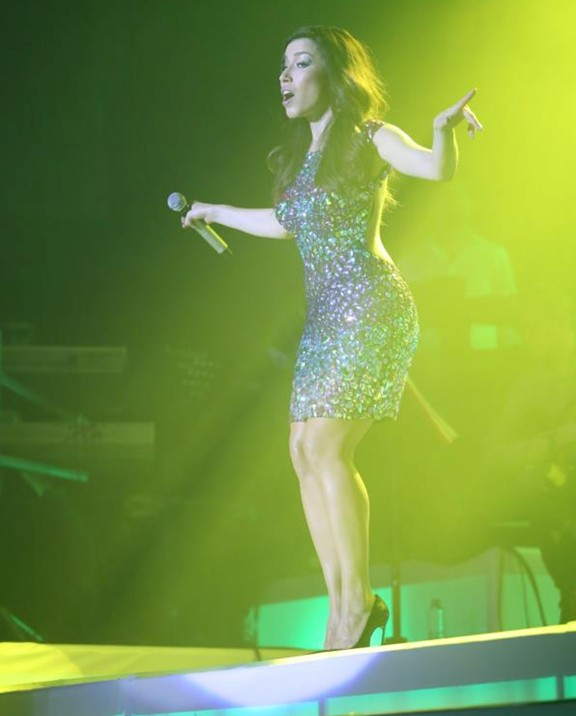
- Güneş in 2013

Background information
- Born: 12 August 1975 (age 51); İzmir, Turkey
- Genres: Pop, folk
- Occupation: Singer-songwriter
- Labels: Raks; Marş; Erol Köse; Seyhan; Yazz; DMC; GNL
- Website: burcugunes.com

Burcu Güneş (Turkish pronunciation: [buɾˈdʒu ɟyˈneʃ]; born 12 August 1975) is a Turkish singer-songwriter.

Burcu Güneş, who is also known for her works on animal rights, participated in a meeting with Prime Minister Recep Tayyip Erdoğan and animal rights activists in February 2011, and has also collaborated with HAYTAP on projects concerning animal rights.

== Discography ==
=== Albums ===
| Release date | Title | Label |
|---|---|---|
| 20 May 1998 | Aşk Yarası | Raks – Marş Müzik |
| 29 May 2001 | Tılsım | Erol Köse Production |
| 9 June 2004 | Ay Şahit | Erol Köse Exclusive |
| 19 December 2006 | Ben Ateş Ben Su | Seyhan Müzik |
| 5 August 2009 | Sihirbaz | Seyhan Müzik |
| 12 February 2013 | Gül Kokusu | GNL |
| 10 March 2018 | Anadolu'nun Güneşi | DMC |
| 16 December 2022 | Benim Yolum | DMC |

=== Remix and compilation albums ===
| Release date | Title | Label |
|---|---|---|
| 18 August 2008 | Burcu Güneş On the Club | Seyhan Müzik |

=== Singles ===
| Release date | Title | Label |
|---|---|---|
| 3 July 2010 | Tamamdır | Yazz Records |
| 24 November 2011 | Oflaya Oflaya | GNL |
| 12 July 2012 | Aşk Gribi | GNL |
| 5 May 2014 | Aşkın Beni Baştan Yazar | GNL |
| 5 August 2015 | Gidiyorum (feat. Yalçın Aşan) | DMC |
| 20 November 2015 | Yakın Mesafe | DMC |
| 29 October 2016 | Birliğe Ulaş | DMC |
| 17 November 2016 | Ağır Yaralı (feat. Enbe Orkestrası) | DMC |
| 25 May 2017 | Darmaduman | DMC |
| 1 July 2019 | Ufo | DMC |
| 27 December 2019 | Kıyasıya | DMC |
| 15 January 2020 | Derman Sendedir (Zümrüdüanka Soundtrack) | DMC |
| 8 February 2020 | O Yar Gelir | DMC |
| 3 April 2020 | Bir Kadın | DMC |
| 27 May 2020 | Benim Hala Umudum Var / Ah Bu Ben | DMC |
| 19 July 2021 | Yaramaz | DMC |
| 22 March 2024 | Sen ve Ben | Güneş Müzik |
| 2 May 2025 | Yankın Var | DMC |
| 8 August 2025 | Neresindeyiz Aşkın? (Söyle) | Güneş Müzik |

== Filmography ==
| Year | Channel | Title | Role | Notes |
|---|---|---|---|---|
| 2004 | – | Neredesin Firuze | Burcu Güneş | Guest appearance |
| 2009 | Fox TV | Üç Tatlı Cadı | Burcu Güneş | Guest appearance |

== TV programs ==
- 2007 – Şarkı Söylemek Lazım 1 – Berke Hürcan's vocal coach (Show TV)
- 2008 – Akademi Türkiye 2 – Guest judge (Kanal 1)
- 2010 – Burcu Güneş ile Pop Caz Alaturka (TRT Müzik)
- 2010 – Yok Böyle Dans 1 – Contestant (together with James Wilson) (Show TV)
