= Iranian Anti-Vivisection Association =

Iranian nonprofit organization

- Formation: 2009
- Founders: Ramak Roshanaie (DDS) Hamed Sufi (PharmD) Zarin Azar (MD) Arash Modarres Amin Hamzeian Majid Araghi
- Type: Animal rights
- Director: Ramak Roshanaie
- Website: noanimaltesting.ir (in Persian)

The Iranian Anti-Vivisection Association (IAVA) is a nonprofit nongovernmental science-based organization. It's the first animal rights advocacy group in Iran which professionally campaigns for lab animal rights‌‌. In 2012, IAVA was recognized as Iran's most active animal rights group and was awarded the Brown Bear statuette by Iran Animal Rights Watch and a number of environmental parties.

== History ==
IAVA was founded by a number of Iranian graduate students, from various medical science fields, as well as vegan and animal rights advocates in 2009. The group's current director is Dr. Ramak Roshanaie Moghaddam.

== Philosophy and activism ==
IAVA's activism is mainly focused on the reduction and replacement of animal experimentation through encouraging the development and implementation of alternative methods in the academic community across the country, particularly aimed at medicine and veterinary education and research.

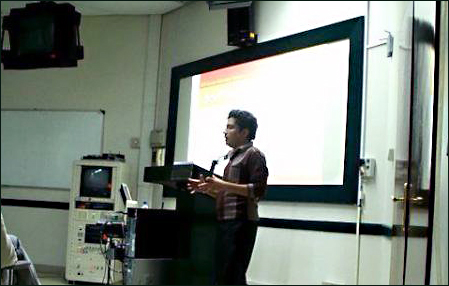
Holding a presentation on "Alternative Approaches to Animal Experimentation" at Iran University of Medical Sciences (2011).

To establish a humane education, training, knowledge and skill acquisition process, IAVA's mission is to ‌raise awareness of the widespread suffering of lab animals along with the promotion of animal testing alternatives by introducing and providing innovative learning tools, organizing workshops, outreach to individual academic figures and specialists, initiating a body donation program in cooperation with shelters and clinics to eliminate the need for purpose-killed animals, publishing professional materials and communicating with fellow international organizations to name a few.

== Academic relations ==
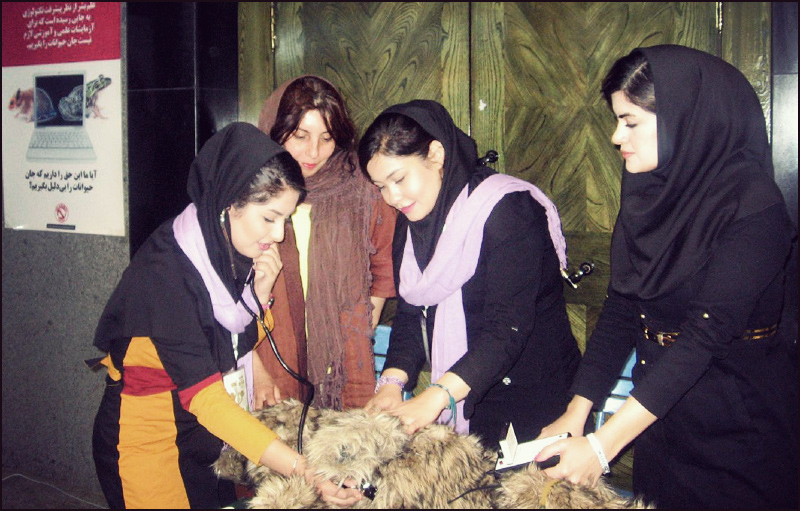
Academic presentation of alternatives to animal testing in veterinary education by IAVA's members.

In order to refine the country's current research and training approach, IAVA has participated in numerous national and international veterinary and animal science congresses. In this regard, papers, documents, booklets, slideshow presentations, leaflets, posters and videos have also been designed, published and distributed.

In case of academic relations, IAVA has arranged a couple of independent seminars in universities including Tehran, Garmsar, Shiraz and Shahriar faculties of veterinary science.

== International relations ==
IAVA is now working in partnership with the International Network for Humane Education (InterNICHE) and is also supported by other organizations such as American Anti-Vivisection Society's educational branch (Animalearn) and International Association Against Painful Experiments on Animals (IAAPEA) and Physicians Committee for Responsible Medicine.

== Publications ==
Darman-e Pak (meaning "refined medicine" in English), an online periodical dedicated to lab animals, is the first Persian publication which critically challenges the use of animals in medical research and introduces viable alternative methods and non-animal tools.

== Achievements ==
As a result of IAVA's efforts to protect animals used for scientific purposes, the issue of animal experimentation has turned to a heated topic and a serious concern to Iran's medical and veterinary education community.

Among the group's achievements is the successful deployment of available alternatives such as the use of donated ethically sourced animal cadavers (i.e. those that are morally obtained from free living, companion, stray or shelter animals who have died by natural causes or in accidents), software programs, computer simulators and manikins in anatomy, pathology, physiology and pharmacology classes. In 2012, IAVA was recognized as Iran's most active animal rights group by Iran Animal Rights Watch and a number of environmental parties.

== See also ==
- InterNICHE
- Humane education
- National Anti-Vivisection Society
- American Anti-Vivisection Society
- The Humane Society of the United States
- British Union for the Abolition of Vivisection
- Physicians Committee for Responsible Medicine
- Fund for the Replacement of Animals in Medical Experiments
- European Partnership for Alternative Approaches to Animal Testing
- List of animal rights groups
