= Equanimal =

Spanish non-profit animal rights organization

- Merged into: Animal Equality
- Founded: 2006
- Merger of: Alternativa para la Liberación Animal ("Alternative for Animal Liberation"); Derechos para los Animales ("Rights for Animals")
- Purpose: Animal rights
- Location: Madrid
- Region served: Spain
- Director: Eladio Ferreira
- Subdirector: Sara Lago
- Website: equanimal.org (in Spanish)

Equanimal was a Spanish non-profit animal rights organization, formed as a merger, in 2006, of the organisations Alternativa para la Liberación Animal ("Alternative for Animal Liberation"; founded in 1986) and Derechos para los Animales ("Rights for Animals"; founded in 2002). In 2012, it merged with the International animal rights organization Animal Equality.

== History ==
Equanimal focuses on ending animal exploitation, such as animal testing, fur farms and the use of fur as clothing, the abandonment of animals, circuses that use animals and zoos, hunting and fishing, and bullfighting.

The methods they use are mainly awareness through media campaigns, protest acts in public places, such as embassies, demonstrations and sometimes open rescues.

Since 2007, they are involved in the sabotage of the Copa Nacional de Caza del Zorro ("National Fox Hunt Cup"), held every year in Galicia, in which they pursue the hunters making noise with megaphones to scare foxes and thereby prevent them from being killed. They also pursue actions that have had the most impact such as entering the ring at the end of a bullfight, and protesting with banners in the Cibeles catwalk during a parade.

Occasionally they have worked with similar organizations in situations such as protests against seal hunting in Canada. Equanimal became a part of the International farmed animal organization Animal Equality in 2012.

== See also ==
- List of animal rights groups
