= Calf 269 =

Calf whose rescue from slaughter led to formation of animal liberation movement

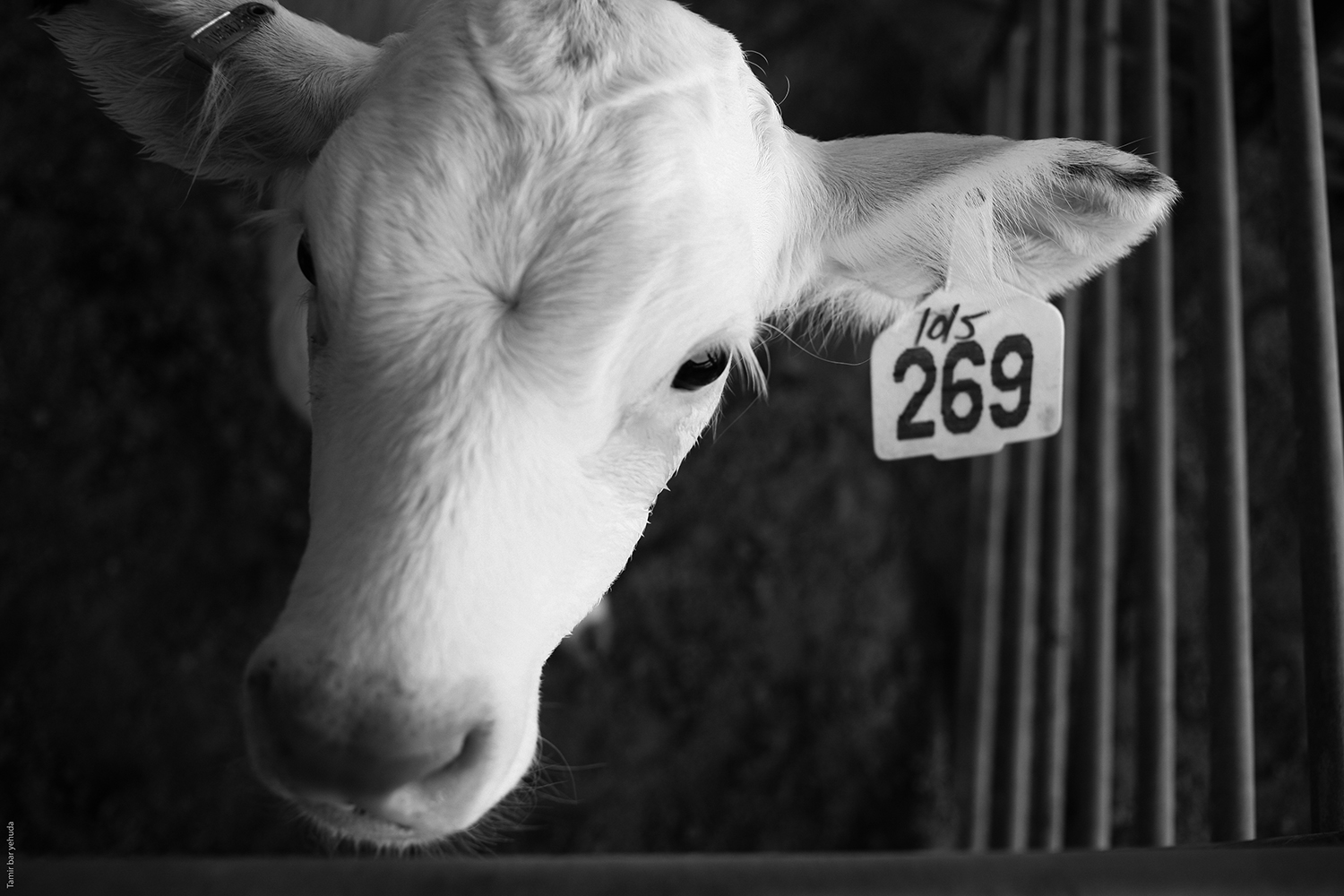
Calf 269, May 2012

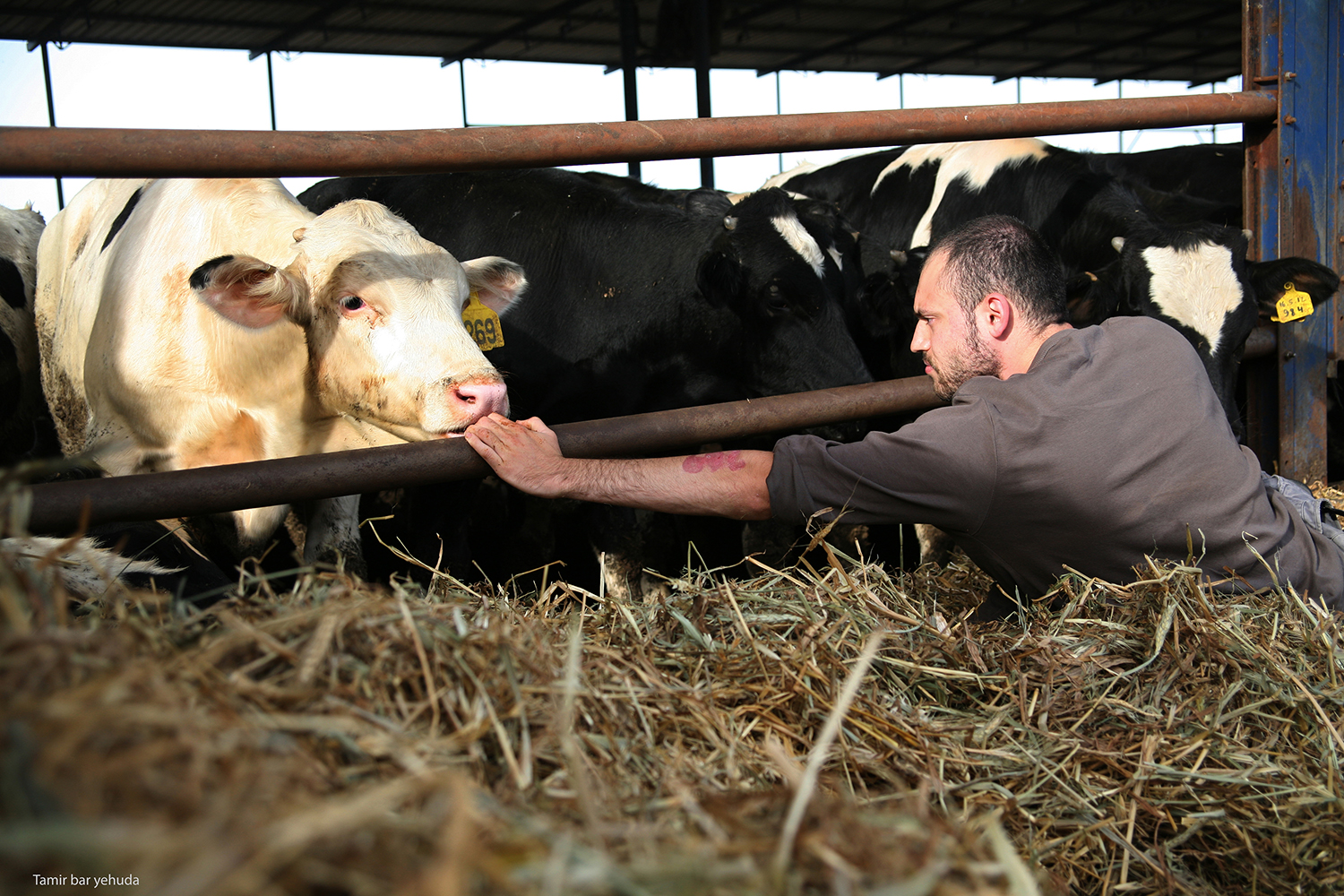
269Life founder Sasha Boojor with Calf 269

Calf 269 is a bull who was rescued as a calf by anonymous activists, days before his planned slaughter. He was born at an Israeli facility in the vicinity of Azor, a town on the outskirts of Tel Aviv. The slaughter was scheduled for June 2013. He is described as sweet-tempered and white-headed, and his ear carried a tag numbered 269, indicating he was destined for slaughter. The Israeli protests regarding the calf were followed by protests in the U.K. and other places across the world. The protests aimed at conveying that animal parts eaten as food by humans once belonged to a living individual, who lived a tortured life and faced a brutal death, after which their carcass was processed into human food. The significance of the event led to the creation of 269 life, an animal liberation movement founded in October 2012.

== Israeli protests ==
On the occasion of World Farm Animals Day, (Gandhi's birthday) 2 October 2012, two Israelis, Zohar Gorelik and Sasha Boojor, and one Russian Jewish activist, Oleg Ozerov, had the number 269 branded on their skin with a hot-iron branding tool. Haaretz reports that this branding was an act of fellowship with Calf 269. The branding incident took place at Tel Aviv's Rabin square. The action is considered an attempt to bring to light the mistreatment of animals in the farming sector.

According to Haaretz the treatment of animals would require terminologies applied to the Holocaust in order to adequately describe the situation. The calf's story has inspired a worldwide tattoo movement; at least a thousand individuals have had themselves branded or tattooed with the number 269. In a testimony a tattooed individual who was a tow truck driver narrated that the tattoo reminded one passenger of his grandmother's stories of German concentration camps.

The website 269life.com was created by Boojor following this protest. The protests were an attempt to end the anonymity of billions of animals butchered for human consumption. The website declares, "This anonymous male calf will be forever immortalized on our bodies, and hopefully this message of solidarity will somehow bring a new way of looking at non-human animals."

== French protests ==
During 2015-2019, a number of protests took place in Paris and around France, organised by 269 Life France. These were intended to draw attention to the consumption of meat and fish, with several taking place near butchers and fish-mongers on 26 September in honour of the calf's numerical name.

== Protests in the United Kingdom ==
In the U.K., campaigners, motivated by this action of the Israelis, decided to brand themselves on their chest with the number 269. This took place in front of a Kentucky Fried Chicken outlet in Leeds a day before their scheduled protest at the Leeds city centre. One protester was jailed; the police allegedly took away cameras and erased memory cards. A protester who was interviewed justified the protest as a reaction to the extreme cruelty perpetrated by the dairy industry such as shooting calves at birth. Protests in London were organised by Becky Folkard. Folkard said that although the protest might be considered extreme, other methods such as fastening oneself to railings and stopping horses by standing in their way were used by women to force authorities to give them a right to vote. PETA's spokesperson in a statement of support pointed that the suffering endured by non-human animals such as cows, chickens, or pigs when they are branded, have their testicles, beaks or horns cut, is no less than that of humans in a similar situation. Folkard's planned protests have been described as a disturbing community agitation opposing barbarity inflicted on industrial dairy animals.

On September 26, 2015 another hot-iron branding was held in Birmingham.

== Response from animal farmers ==
Joseph Keating, livestock adviser of the National Farmers Union is quoted in a Guardian story as expressing surprise in response to the English protests. According to Keating, branding of animals has been banned in England for many years.

== See also ==
- Dairy farming
- Human branding
- Jewish vegetarianism
- List of animal rights groups
