= No Compromise (magazine) =

American animal rights magazine

No Compromise, issue 29

No Compromise was a San Francisco, California, United States–based bi-annual animal rights magazine, first published in the winter of 1989. The magazine covered global aspects of animal rights and promoted a vegan lifestyle, which included the use of cruelty-free products.

The magazine was founded by Freeman Wicklund and stopped publishing in 2005 with the 29th issue. Later it was a website for news links about grassroots direct action, militant animal liberationists, their supporters and the Animal Liberation Front (ALF). It is no longer active.

== See also ==
- Bite Back
- Arkangel Magazine
- List of animal rights groups
