= Animal Welfare Network Nepal =

- Purpose: Promotion of animal welfare and rights

Animal Welfare Network Nepal is non-profit body that helps to increase the effectiveness of animal welfare organizations in Nepal.

== Objectives ==
- Coordinate the activities of animal welfare organizations
- Raise awareness on animal welfare issues among the public
- Lobby and advocate for animal rights
- Promote stray dog adoptions
- Provide education and support to its members

== See also ==
- List of animal rights groups
