= Animal Justice (organization) =

Canadian animal law organization

- Founded: 2008; 18 years ago
- Type: Non-profit
- Purpose: Animal law
- Location: Toronto, Ontario
- Region served: Canada
- Key people: Camille Labchuk (Executive Director)
- Website: www.animaljustice.ca

Animal Justice is a Canadian nonprofit organization with three main areas of focus: lobbying for stronger animal protection laws, improved enforcement of those laws, and fighting for animals in court.

It is Canada’s only national organization dedicated to advancing the interests of animals in the law. The organization makes submissions in court to obtain intervenor status and provide the perspective of animals. The organization was founded in 2008 and is led by animal rights lawyer Camille Labchuk.

== Cases and campaigns ==
=== Papanack Park Zoo investigation ===
In 2017, Animal Justice released undercover footage taken by a whistleblower who worked on the grounds of Papanack Park Zoo near Ottawa, Ontario. The zoo was investigated but no charges were laid.

=== Ban on bestiality ===
In 2016, Animal Justice was the first animal advocacy group to make oral arguments as an intervener in a Supreme Court of Canada case in order to provide context to the Court's assessment. The case identified a loophole that most sexual abuse of animals in Canada was not illegal. Following the case, Animal Justice campaigned for Bill C-84, which closed the loophole and banned all forms on bestiality in Canada.

=== Ban on whale and dolphin captivity ===
Animal Justice supported the passage of Bill S-203 that phases out the practice of keeping cetaceans in captivity in Canada and prohibits breeding of cetaceans and collecting reproductive materials from them.

=== Ban on shark fin imports ===
Animal Justice supported the passage of Bill C-68, banning shark finning in Canadian waters and the import and export of shark fins.

=== Paragon pig farm investigation ===
In 2020, W5 (TV program) aired Animal Justice’s undercover investigation showing alleged abuse at a pig farm in Puntam, Ontario.

=== Cedar Valley organic dairy farm investigation ===
In 2021, Animal Justice released an undercover video showing allegations of animal abuse at an organic dairy farm in Abbotsford, BC. The footage prompted an investigation from British Columbia Society for the Prevention of Cruelty to Animals and the farm had its licence suspended.

=== Ag gag lawsuit ===
In 2021, Animal Justice filed a constitutional challenge to anti-whistleblower laws in Ontario that would make it illegal for journalists and animal advocates to go undercover on farms to expose animal cruelty, known as “ag gag” laws. The organization is arguing that the Ontario law violates Canadians’ right to freedom of expression.

== Canadian Animal Law Conference ==
The organization has held an annual national animal law conference since 2019. Philosopher Peter Singer was the keynote speaker at the first conference in 2019. The 2022 Canadian Animal Law Conference had 200 attendees and discussed legal developments furthering animal rights in Canada.

== See also ==
- Animal welfare and rights in Canada
- List of animal rights groups
