= Massachusetts Animal Rights Coalition =

U.S. non-profit organization

The Massachusetts Animal Rights Coalition (MARC) is a non-profit volunteer-run animal rights organization based in Massachusetts, United States. MARC is the largest and most active animal rights group in Massachusetts and operates as a tax exempt 501(c)(3) corporation with over 2500 members of all ages and backgrounds

MARC's activities include protests and leafleting, public educational outreach, tabling, talks, letter and phone campaigns, letters to editors, face-to-face meetings, media interviews, conferences, walks and marches, and legislative action. MARC has held hundreds of public events in Massachusetts to raise awareness of animal suffering.

MARC targets a broad range of animal rights causes, including animal testing and experimentation, animals in entertainment, veganism, wildlife protection, and the rights of all animals.

MARC's campaigns in Massachusetts have been cited in numerous local papers and have included opposition to vivisection; advocacy for wildlife, farmed animals, and cruelty-free living; and advocacy for animals exploited in entertainment and companion animals.

== See also ==
- List of animal rights groups
