= Death of Jill Phipps =

Death of English animal rights activist

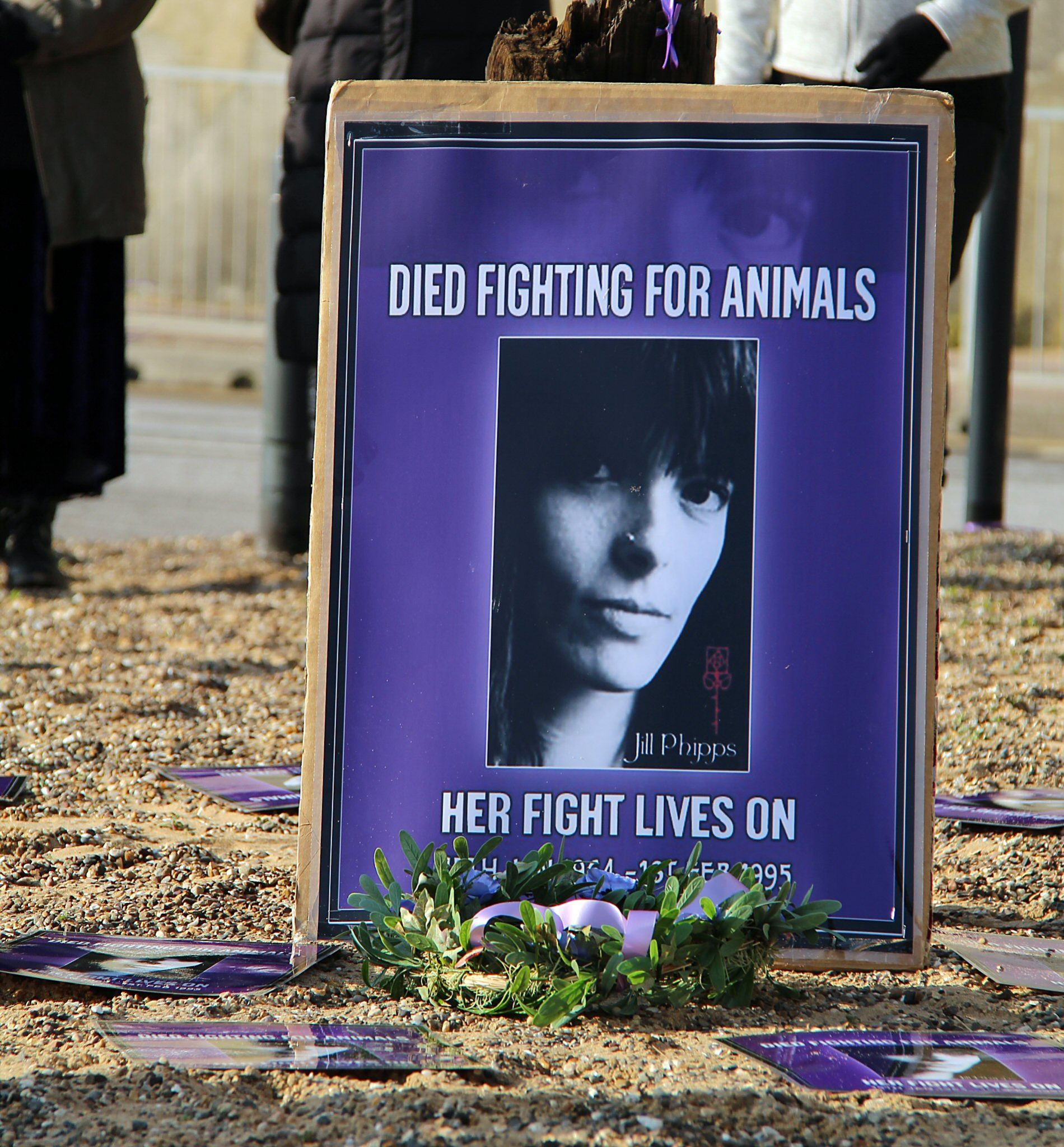
- Jill Phipps memorial march in 2012
- Date: 1 February 1995; 31 years ago
- Location: Baginton, England
- Type: Traffic fatality

On 1 February 1995, English animal rights activist Jill Phipps was crushed to death under a lorry during a protest to stop the air export of live calves for veal near Coventry Airport.

== Background of protests ==
In 1994, animal rights protesters in England had convinced the major ferries (P & O, Stena Sealink, and Brittany Ferries) to stop live animal exports. In January 1995, a group of thirty farmers established an organization (ITF) to acquire alternative transportation through sea and air ports. One such pathway was air exports via Coventry Airport. Protesters had successfully pressured Coventry, Plymouth and Dover officials to ban the exports, but all were ordered by the courts to permit them. (Note: "It is the fear of unlawful disruption which has prompted Coventry and Dover to refuse the trade (Coventry's ban being subject to the court first lifting the injunction requiring it at present to accept the trade); and which prompts Plymouth City Council to seek a similar ban. All three authorities, let it be clear at once, expressly now disavow animal welfare considerations as any part of their motivation (although earlier it was otherwise with both Coventry and Plymouth City Councils).")

When exports resumed in early January 1995 via the port in Shoreham, Sussex, a crowd of 500–600 protesters "blocked the roads, damaged the lorries and were violent to the drivers and the police" which succeeded in stopping sea exports for a few days, until authorities added over 1,000 policemen to escort the convoys. Policing costs exceeded £6 million and 20,000 man-hours, and the Chief Constable of Sussex declared they would only support the ports two days a week and that they would prevent passage of lorries on the other days. These quantitative restrictions were challenged in court and it was "concluded that the unlawful activity of protesters and its effects on police resources provided no justification for totally prohibiting a lawful trade."

More court wranglings followed, but in the end the trade was ended in 1996 when most of the European Union boycotted British beef due to an outbreak of mad cow disease. In 2006 this ban was lifted, but Coventry Airport's executive chairman pledged that he would refuse requests to fly live calves.

== Jill Phipps ==
Jill Phipps
- Born: 15 January 1964; Coventry, England
- Died: 1 February 1995 (aged 31); Baginton, England
- Occupation: Animal rights activist

Jill Phipps (15 January 1964 – 1 February 1995) left school at the age of 16 and went to work for Royal Mail. She had become interested in caring for animals when young, and joined her mother campaigning against the fur trade from the age of 11. After herself becoming a vegetarian, Phipps persuaded the rest of her family to join her. Phipps joined the Eastern Animal Liberation League, and a local campaign Phipps and her mother took part in resulted in a local fur shop and fur farm closing down due to the pressure.

In 1986, together with her mother and sister, Phipps raided the Unilever laboratories in objection of their practice of vivisection, and "smashed computer equipment, causing thousands of pounds worth of damage". The group was caught and prosecuted: Phipps' mother was sentenced to six months imprisonment, her sister to eighteen months, but Phipps herself received a suspended sentence as she was pregnant.

After her son was born, Phipps spent less time protesting, attending occasional demonstrations and hunt sabotage meetings with her young son. The use of Coventry airport for export of veal calves horrified her, and in January 1995 she walked almost 100 miles from Coventry to Westminster to protest. On her 31st birthday she protested outside the home of the man who ran Phoenix Aviation, the firm that operated the exports from Coventry airport.

== Fatal accident ==
On 1 February 1995, Phipps was one of 35 protesters at Coventry Airport in Baginton, protesting the export of live calves to Amsterdam for distribution across Europe. Ten protesters broke through police lines and were trying to bring the lorry to a halt by sitting in the road or chaining themselves to it when Phipps was crushed beneath the lorry's wheels; her fatal injuries included a broken spine.

An hour after she arrived on the day she died, the lorry appeared. Most of the protesters were further down the road but a small group, including Ms Phipps who had arrived earlier, were at the entrance of the airport when the articulated lorry came up the road. As it bypassed the main group of campaigners, she ran, arms outstretched, headlong towards it. She clambered up the front wing. Her sister watched in horror as she slipped and fell beneath the wheels.

The Crown Prosecution Service ruled there was no evidence to bring any charges against the driver. Phipps' family blamed the police for her death because the police were working to keep the convoy of lorries moving. The inquest heard that the driver may have been distracted by a protester running into the road ahead of him, who was being removed by a policeman. A verdict of accidental death was returned.

== Funeral ==
Paul Oestreicher, Canon Residentiary and Director of the International Centre for Reconciliation at Coventry Cathedral, offered the Cathedral as the venue for Jill's funeral to the Phipps family, as it was felt that her local parish church in Hillfields would not be able to accommodate the number of people expected to attend. Her funeral was held at the Cathedral on 14 February 1995. The service was attended by large numbers of mourners, including the actress Brigitte Bardot and politician and former cabinet minister Alan Clark, and drew international attention.

== Legacy ==
For many years, animal rights protests were held around the anniversary date of Phipps' death. Many have claimed Phipps was a martyr to the cause. Though Phipps had been quoted as saying "Yes, I think people could be hurt ... We are so determined to stop this trade, we will go that far," her father said "Jill was no martyr to the cause. She had a young son to live for. She did not want to die." Her friend and fellow activist John Curtin has reflected that “there were big headlines that Jill lay down in front of the lorries and gave her life as a martyr, but that didn’t happen. She was protesting. She was demonstrating. She didn’t plan what happened. It was a complete tragedy".

Jill's Film, with footage of the Coventry protests, of Phipps, her funeral, and interviews with Phipps' family was produced by Curtin. It was shown for the first time at the Jill's Day 2007 event in Coventry. The Birmingham poet Benjamin Zephaniah wrote a poem about Phipps, which was read for the first time during a march to commemorate the 10th anniversary of her death.

A memorial plaque has been placed at the exact spot where she died.

== See also ==
- Death of Regan Russell
- List of animal rights advocates
- Live export
