= Human branding =

Process by which a mark is permanently burned into the skin of a living person

Human branding or stigmatizing is the process by which a mark, usually a symbol or ornamental pattern, is burned into the skin of a living person, with the intention of the resulting scar making it permanent. This is performed using a hot or very cold branding iron. It therefore uses the physical techniques of livestock branding on a human, either with consent as a form of body modification; or under coercion, as a punishment or to identify an enslaved, oppressed, or otherwise controlled person. It may also be practiced as a "rite of passage", e.g. within a tribe, or to signify membership of or acceptance into an organization.

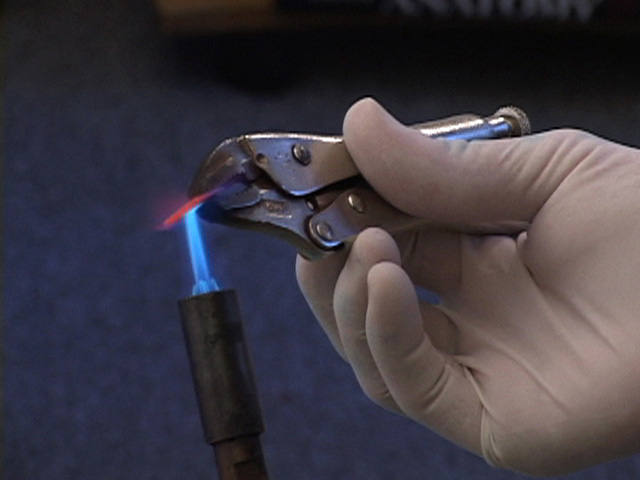
Modern strike branding

== Etymology ==
The English verb "to burn", attested since the 12th century, is a combination of Old Norse brenna "to burn, light", and two originally distinct Old English verbs: bærnan "to kindle" (transitive) and beornan "to be on fire" (intransitive), both from the Proto-Germanic root bren(wanan), perhaps from a Proto-Indo-European root bhre-n-u, from base root bhereu- "to boil forth, well up". In Dutch, (ver)branden mean "to burn", brandmerk a branded mark; similarly, in German, Brandzeichen means "a brand" and brandmarken, "to brand".

Sometimes, the word cauterize is used. This is known in English since 1541, and is derived via Medieval French cauteriser from Late Latin cauterizare "to burn or brand with a hot iron", itself from Greek καυτηριάζειν, kauteriazein, from καυτήρ kauter "burning or branding iron", from καίειν kaiein "to burn". However, cauterization is now generally understood to mean a medical process – specifically, to stop bleeding.

== Historical use ==
=== Marking the rightless ===
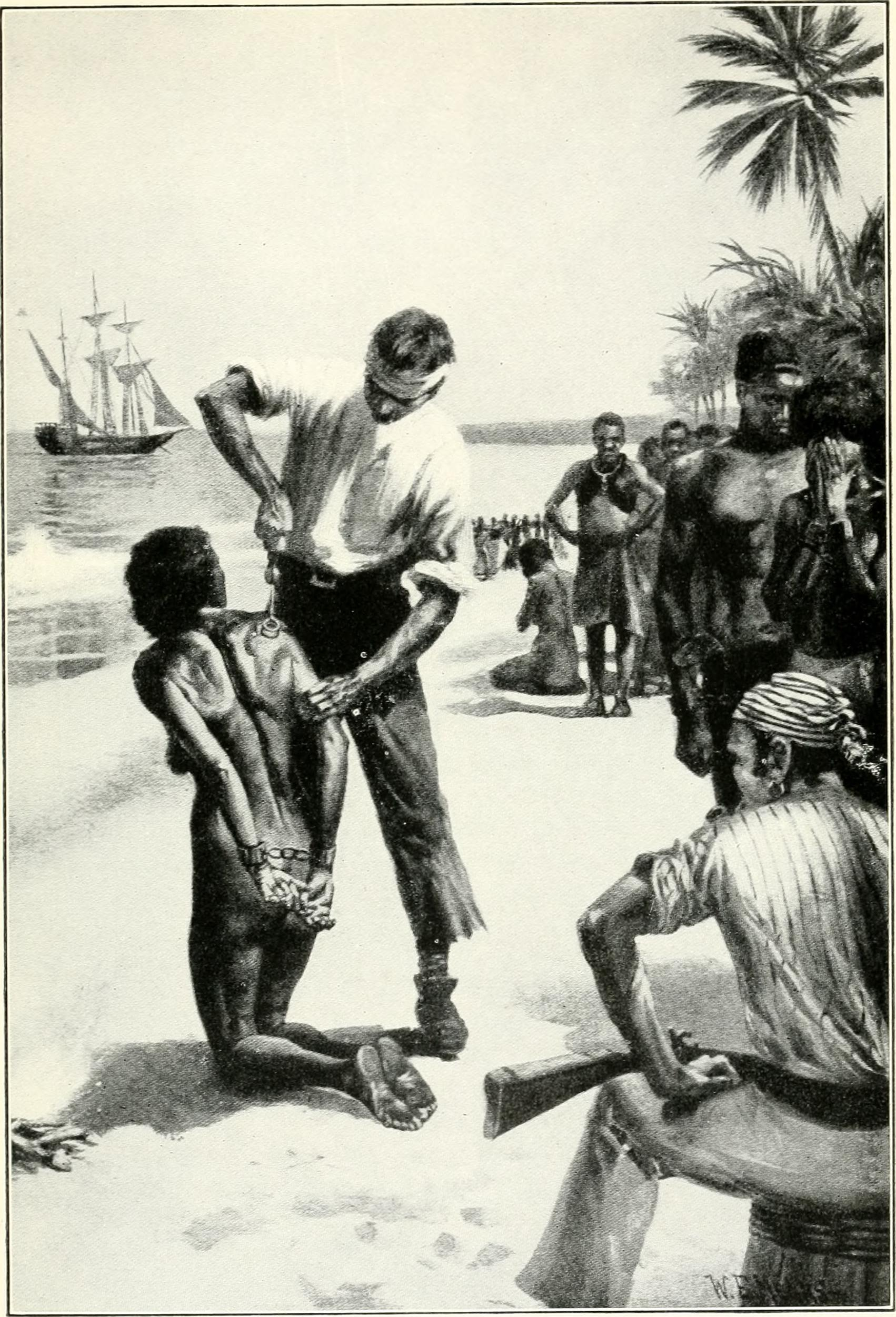
Branding of a nude enslaved woman in Africa

- European, American, and other colonial slavers branded millions of slaves during the period of the Atlantic slave trade. Sometimes there were several brandings, e.g. for the Portuguese crown and the (consecutive) private owner(s), an extra cross after baptism as well as by African slave catchers.
- Ancient Romans marked runaway slaves with the letters FVG (for fugitivus).
- In modern Sudan, there are reports of branding of slaves.
- An intermediate case between formal slavery and criminal law occurs when a convict is branded and legally reduced, with or without time limit, to a slave-like status, such as on the galleys (in France branded GAL or T travaux forcés 'forced labour' until 1832), in a penal colony, or upon auction to a private owner.

=== As punishment ===
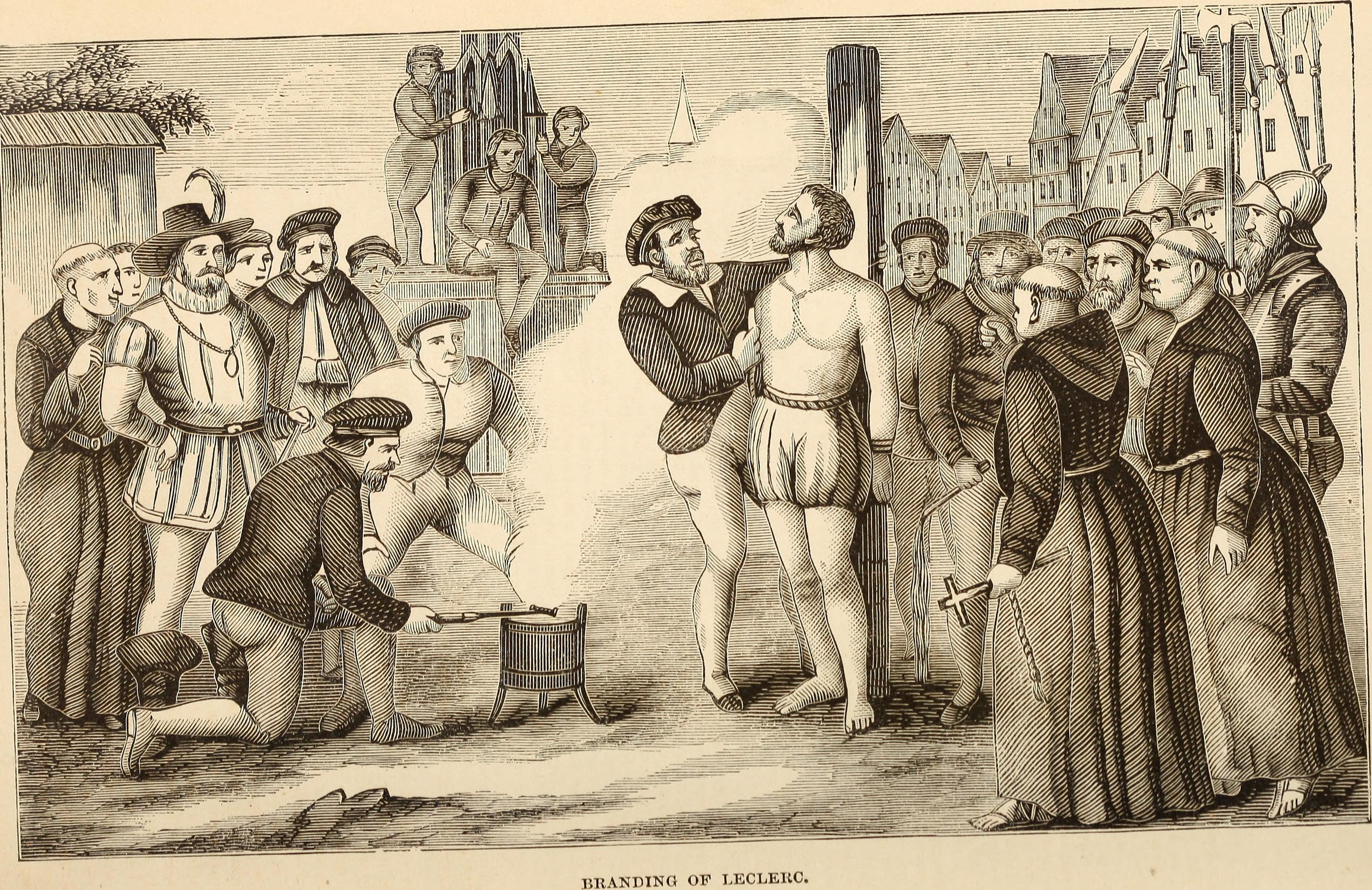
Branding of the Huguenot John (or Jean) Leclerc during the 16th century persecutions

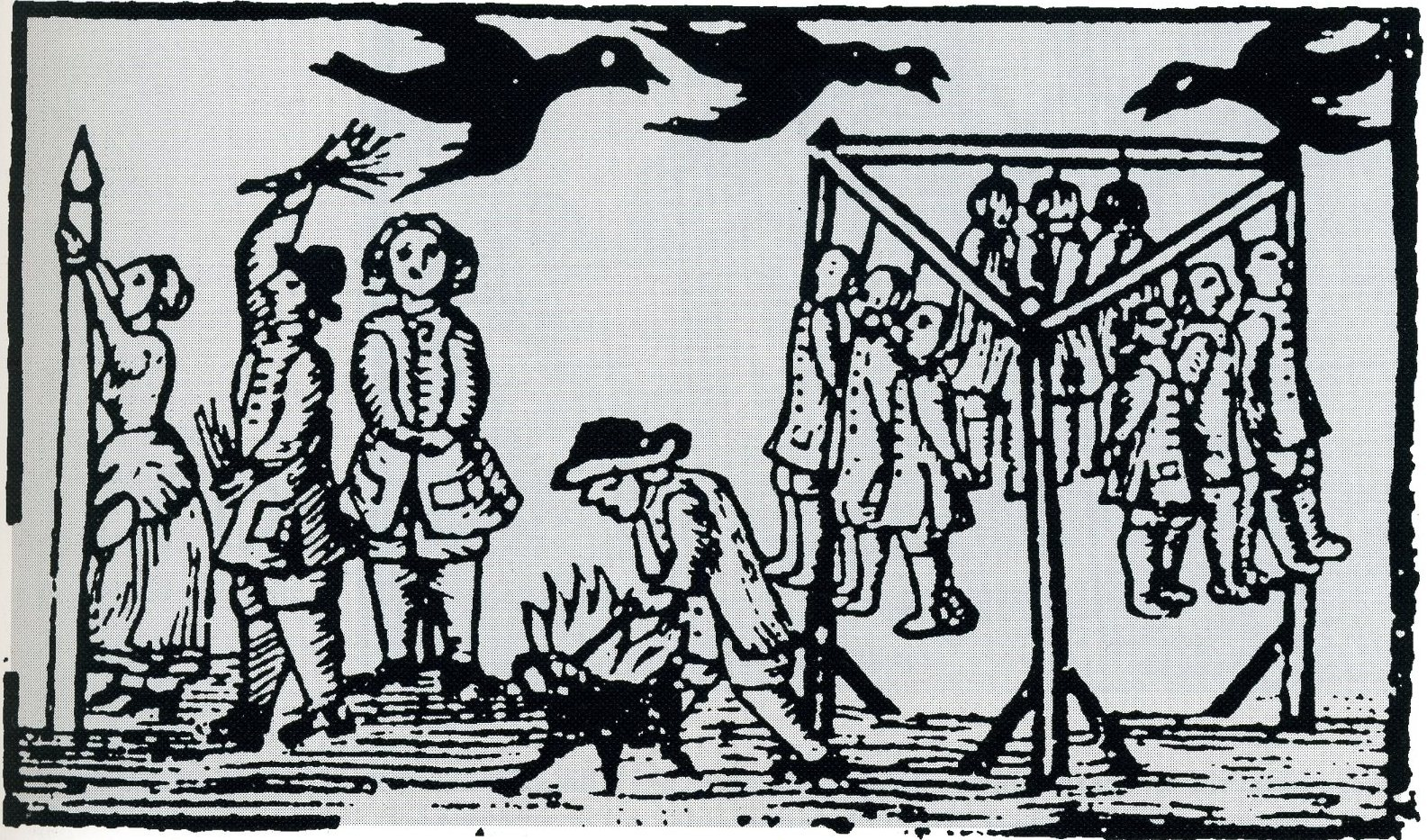
Whipping and branding of thieves in Denmark, 1728

In criminal law, branding with a hot iron was a mode of punishment consisting of marking the subject as if goods or animals, sometimes concurrently with their reduction of status in life.

Brand marks have also been used as a punishment for convicted criminals, combining physical punishment, as burns are very painful, with public humiliation (greatest if marked on a normally visible part of the body) which is here the more important intention, and with the imposition of an indelible criminal record.

Robbers, like runaway slaves, were marked by the Romans with the letter F (fur); and the toilers in the mines, and convicts condemned to figure in gladiatorial shows, were branded on the forehead for identification. Under Constantine I the face was not permitted to be so disfigured, the branding being on the hand, arm or calf.

The Acts of Sharbel record it applied, amongst other tortures, to a Christian between the eyes and on the cheeks in Parthian Edessa at the time of the Roman Emperor Trajan on a judge's order for refusal to sacrifice.

In the 16th century, German Anabaptists were branded with a cross on their foreheads for refusing to recant their faith and join the Roman Catholic church.

In the North American colonial settlements of the 17th and early 18th centuries, branding was a common punishment for those found guilty of crimes. The type of brand differed from crime to crime. Men and women sentenced for adultery were branded with an A letter on their chest, D for drunkenness and B for blasphemy or burglary, T on the hand for thief, SL on the cheek for seditious libel, R on the shoulder for rogue or vagabond, and F on the cheek for forgery. Those convicted of burglary on the Lord's Day were branded upon their forehead.

During the early stages of the American Revolution, some Loyalists were branded on the face with the letters G.R (for George Rex, i.e. King George) by Patriots as punishment for perceived servility to the Crown.

In late 18th century England the letter used would indicate the type of crime committed, eg SS (Sower of Sedition), M (Malefactor), B (Blasphemer), F (Fraymaker) and R (Rogue), for example.

The mark in later times was also often chosen as a code for the crime (e.g., D for desertion and BC for bad character in Canada. Most branded men were shipped off to a penal colony). Branding was also used by the Confederate Army during the American Civil War.

Until 1832 in France, various offenses carried the additional infamy of being branded with a fleur de lis and galley slaves could be branded GAL or, once the galleys were replaced by the bagnes on land, T (travaux forcés, 'forced' labor, i.e. hard labour) or TP (travaux forcés à perpetuité, hard labour for life), with an additional F added for forgery. In most of the German-speaking states, however, branding people was unlawful.

Following the Conspiracy of the Slaves of 1749 in Malta, some slaves were branded with the letter R (for ribelli) on their forehead and condemned to the galleys for life.

Branding tended to be abolished like other judicial mutilations (with notable exceptions, such as amputation under sharia law), sooner and more widely than flogging, caning, and similar corporal punishments, which normally aim 'only' at pain and at worst cause stripe scars, although the most severe lashings (not uncommon in penal colonies) in terms of dosage and instrument (such as the proverbial knout) can even turn out to cause death.

=== United States ===
==== As criminal punishment ====
In Pennsylvania, the horse theft law "An Act to Increase the Punishments of Horse Stealing" was passed in 1780 and repealed in 1860, which stated people guilty of such a crime should be branded. The law ran as follows; "the first offense [the convicted] shall stand in the pillory for one hour, and shall be publicly whipped on his, or her [bare] backs with thirty-nine lashes, well laid on, and at the same time shall have his or her ears cut off and nailed to the pillory, and for the second offense shall be whipped and pilloried in like manner and be branded on the forehead in a plain and visible manner with the letters H. T."

This punishment was referenced in Cormac McCarthy's novel Blood Meridian as the character Toadvine is branded with the letters H. T. on his forehead. H stands for Horse, T for Thief and F for Felon; "On his forehead were burned the letters H T and lower and almost between the eyes the letter F and these markings were splayed and garish as if the iron had been left too long. When he turned to look at the kid, the kid could see that he had no ears."

==== For slavery ====
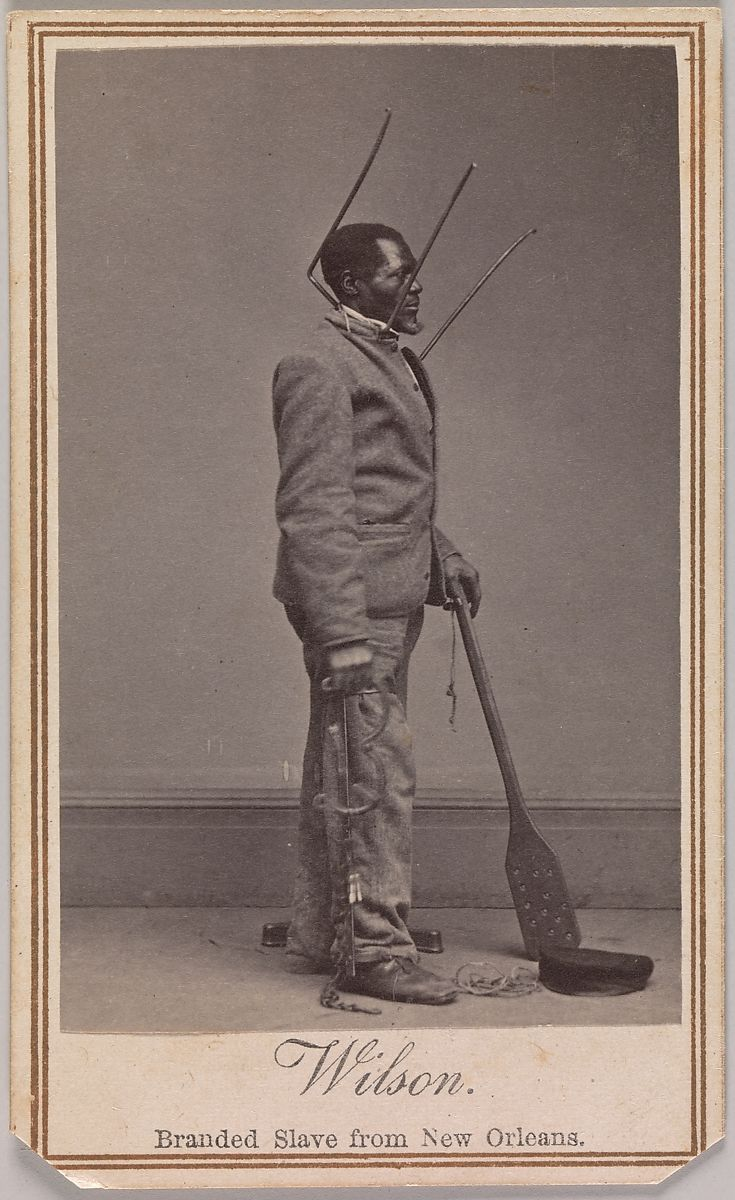
Wilson Chinn, the famous "branded slave" photo

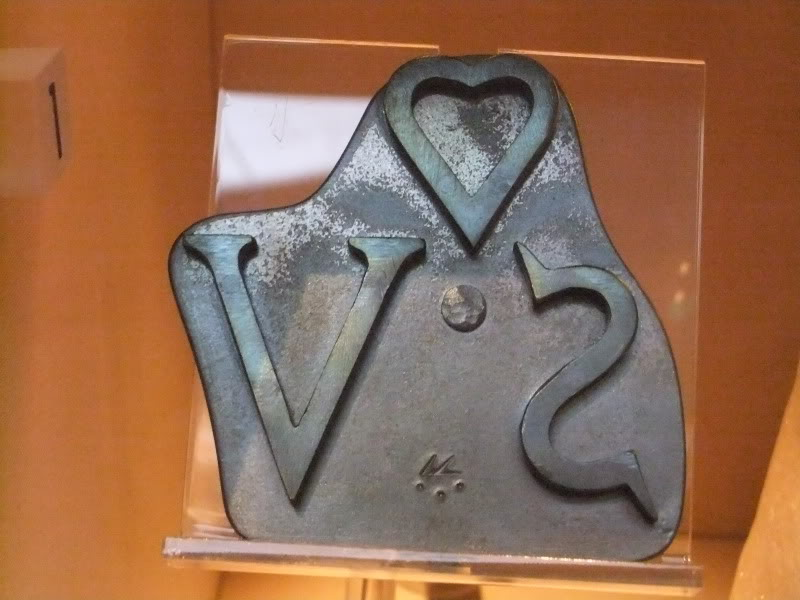
A replica of a slave branding iron originally used in the Atlantic slave trade, on display at the Museum of Liverpool, England

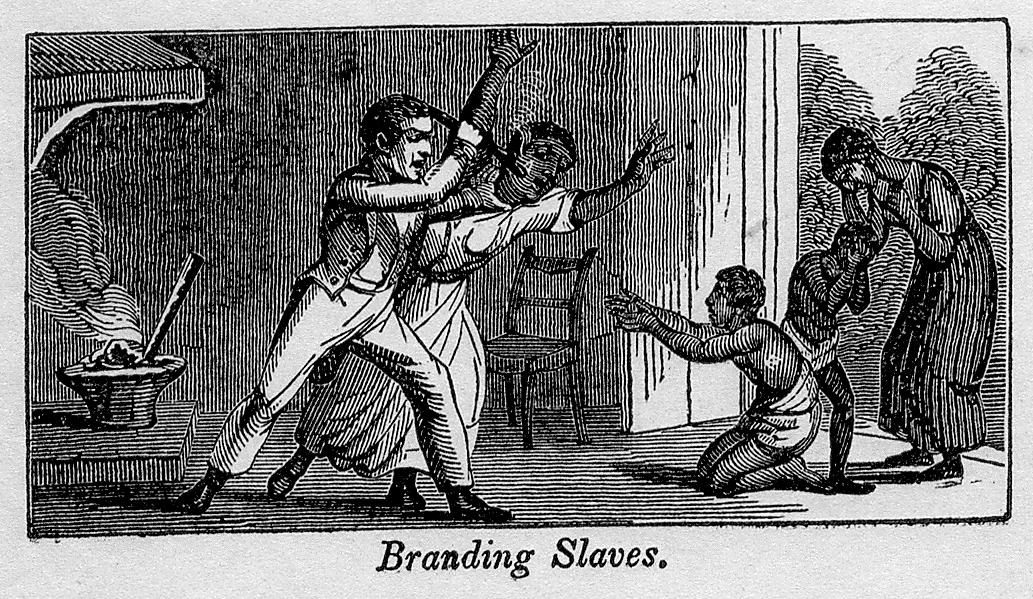
Depiction of slave branding, from Illustrations of the American Anti-Slavery Almanac for 1840

In Louisiana, there was a "black code", or Code Noir, which allowed the cropping of ears, shoulder branding, and hamstringing, the cutting of tendons near the knee, as punishments for recaptured slaves. Slave owners used extreme punishments to stop flight, or escape. They would often brand the slaves' palms, shoulders, buttocks, or cheeks with a branding iron.

Branding was sometimes used to mark recaptured runaway slaves to help the locals easily identify the runaway. Micajah Ricks, a slave owner in Raleigh, North Carolina, was looking for his slave and described, "I burnt her with a hot iron, on the left side of her face, I tried to make the letter M." Another testimony explains how a slave owner in Kentucky around 1848 was looking for his runaway slave. He described her having "a brand mark on the breast something like L blotched". In South Carolina, when a slave ran away twice, they could be marked with the letter R on their forehead.

=== As religious initiation ===
Ceremonial branding is an integral part of religious initiation for some Hindus. References to this practice can be traced in texts such as Narad Panchratra, Vaikhnasagama, Skanda Purana, etc. This practice remains prevalent among some Hindus of Karnataka in India, who brand small marks on both shoulders (for men) or forearms (for women). This practice is not without controversy; a Hindu temple in Sugar Land, Texas, USA was sued by the father of an eleven-year-old boy who was branded during a religious ceremony there.

=== Britain ===
The punishment was adopted by the Anglo-Saxons, and the ancient law of England authorized the penalty. By the Statute of Vagabonds (1547) under King Edward VI, vagabonds and Roma were ordered to be branded with a large V on the breast, and "brawlers" with F for "fraymaker". Slaves who ran away were branded with S on the cheek or forehead. This law was repealed in England in 1550.

From the time of Henry VII, branding was inflicted for all offences which received benefit of clergy. Branding of the thumbs was used around 1600 at the Old Bailey, to ensure that the accused who had successfully used benefit of clergy, by reading a passage from the Bible, could not use it more than once. It was abolished for such in 1822.

In 1655, James Nayler, a Quaker, was accused of claiming to be the Messiah, and was convicted of blasphemy in a highly publicised trial before the Second Protectorate Parliament. He had his tongue bored through and his forehead branded B for "blasphemer". In 1698 it was enacted that those convicted of petty theft or larceny, who were entitled to benefit of clergy, should be "burnt in the most visible part of the left cheek, nearest the nose". This special ordinance was repealed in 1707.

In the Lancaster Criminal Court, a branding iron is preserved in the dock. It is a long bolt with a wooden handle at one end and an M for malefactor at the other. Close by are two iron loops for firmly securing the hands during the operation. The brander would, after examination, turn to the judge exclaiming "A fair mark, my lord." Criminals were ordered to hold up their hands before their sentence, to show if they had been previously convicted.

In the 18th century, cold branding, or branding with cold irons, became the mode of nominally inflicting the punishment on prisoners of higher rank. "When Charles Moritz, a young German, visited England in 1782 he was much surprised at this custom, and in his diary mentioned the case of a clergyman who had fought a duel and killed his man in Hyde Park. Found guilty of manslaughter he was burnt in the hand, if that could be called burning which was done with a cold iron". From Markham's Ancient Punishments of Northants, 1886.

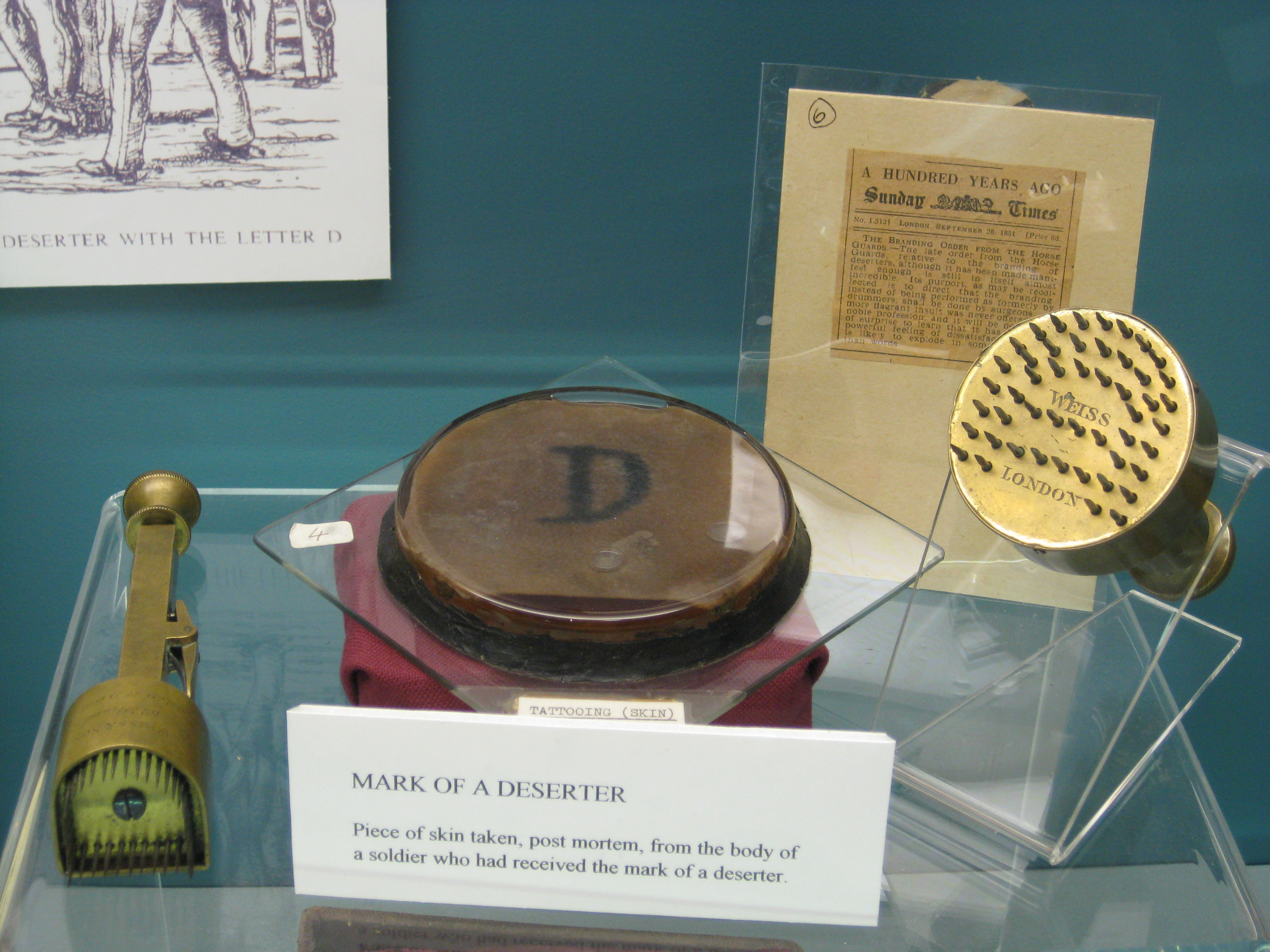
Mark of a deserter from the British Army. Tattoo on skin and equipment. Displayed at Army Medical Services Museum.

Such cases led to branding becoming obsolete. It was abolished in 1829, except in the case of deserters from the army, who were marked with the letter D, not with hot irons but by tattooing with ink or gunpowder. Notoriously bad soldiers were also branded with BC (bad character). The British Mutiny Act 1858 provided that the court-martial might, in addition to any other penalty, order deserters to be marked on the left side, 2 inches (5.1 cm) below the armpit, with the letter D, such letter to be not less than an inch long. In 1879 this was abolished.

=== Australia ===
Offenders in Australia were subject to branding in accordance with British law. In 1826, in Hobart, Joseph Clarke was charged with manslaughter and 'sentenced to be burnt in the hand'. In 1850, in New South Wales, deserter Daniel O'Neil was tattooed with the letter 'D'.

=== Russia ===
Branding in Russia was used quite extensively in the 18th century and the first half of the 19th century. Over time, red hot iron brands were gradually replaced by tattoo boards; criminals were first branded on the forehead and cheeks, later on the back and arms. Branding was totally abolished in 1863.

=== Prostitutes ===
Forced and enslaved prostitutes have often been tattooed or branded with a mark of their owners. Women and girls being forced into prostitution would have their boss's name or gang symbol inked or branded with hot iron on their skin. In some organizations involved with the trafficking of women and girls like the mafias nearly all prostitutes are marked. Some pimps and organisations use their name or well-known symbol, others are using secret signs.

The branding is both painful and humiliating for the victim, especially when done with a branding iron, and may be also a form of punishment and of psychological submission for the prostitutes.

Some years ago the brands were usually small, only recognized by other pimps, sometimes hidden between the inner vaginal lips, though other instances show that pimps have no issue with larger, more noticeable brands.

== Persisting practices ==
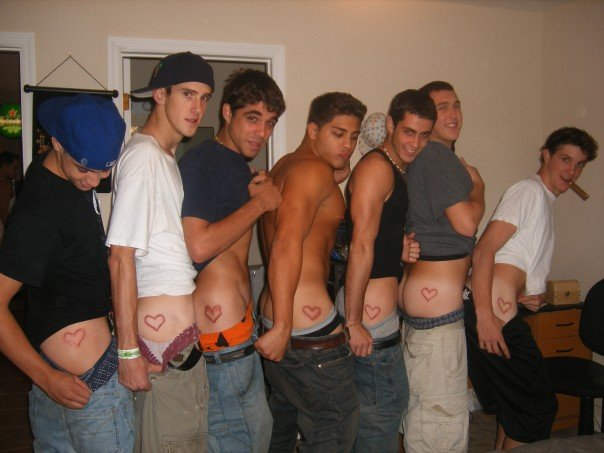
Members of a fraternity displaying their new heart brands

Generally voluntary, though often under severe social pressure, branding may be used as a painful form of initiation, serving both as endurance and motivation test (rite of passage) and a permanent membership mark, seen as male bonding. Branding is also practiced as a form of body art, and sometimes in BDSM relationships. Branding is thus practiced:

- By some street gangs
- In organized crime as "stripes" to signify a violent crime that the person committed. Typically on the upper arm or upper torso.
- In prisons
- Some members of college fraternities and sororities voluntarily elect to be branded with their fraternity/sorority letters. This is considerably less common in sororities than fraternities and is especially prevalent in some historically African-American fraternities, such as Omega Psi Phi.
- Sometimes as an extreme initiation in the increasingly less common tradition of painful hazing (otherwise mostly paddling).
- As a voluntary body decoration – a form of permanent body art rather like many tattoos.
- In some consensual BDSM relationships, with a dominant branding their name or symbol onto their submissive.
- In cyberbullying, branding has established itself as a method of humiliation and is called fansigning. This bullying technique gained wider notoriety through media coverage of the 764-network. In fansigning, perpetrators force their victims through blackmail to carve or tattoo symbols, names, online aliases, or group names into their skin. Victims are often coerced into sending video or image material to the perpetrators, who then share it within their networks.

== Protests ==
In symbolic solidarity with Calf 269, protesters in Israel subjected themselves to branding on World Farm Animals Day (Gandhi's birthday): October 2, 2012. This act was emulated by others in England and Czechia. An English protester who was interviewed explained the act as a reaction to the extreme cruelty perpetrated by the dairy industry such as shooting calves at birth.

== Methods ==
Strike branding
Similar to the process used to brand livestock, this method presses a heated piece of metal onto the skin for the brand. Historically it was used to claim ownership of slaves or to punish criminals, but as a form of body art, strike branding is less preferable to other types because it is not precise and tends to spread greatly on healing, and is not advisable for curved areas of the body. More successful is the multi-strike brand; it is done piece-by-piece rather than all at once. For example, to get a V-shaped brand, two lines would be burned separately by a straight piece of metal, rather than by a V-shaped piece of metal.
Cautery branding
This is a less common form of branding. It uses a thermal cautery tool with a heated wire tip to cause the burns.
Laser branding
"Laser" branding is a marketing term coined by Steve Haworth, who pioneered its use in body modification. The technical term is "electrosurgical branding". Though it is technically possible to use a medical laser for scarification, this term refers not to an actual laser, but rather to an electrosurgical unit which uses electricity to cut and cauterize the skin, similar to the way an arc welder works. Electric sparks jump from the hand-held pen of the device to the skin, vaporizing it. This is a more precise form of scarification, because it is possible to greatly regulate the depth and nature of the damage being done to the skin. Whereas with traditional direct branding, heat is transferred to the tissues surrounding the brand, burning and damaging them, electrosurgery branding vaporizes the skin so precisely and so quickly that little to no heat or damage to the surrounding skin is caused. This means that pain and healing time after the scarification is greatly lessened.
Cold branding
This rare method of branding is the same thing as strike branding, except that the metal branding tool is subjected to extreme cold (such as liquid nitrogen) rather than extreme heat. This method will cause the hair on the brand to grow back white and will not cause keloiding. This process is also used in livestock and called freeze branding in that context.

== See also ==
- Criminal tattoo
- Number of the beast
- Scarification for details on cosmetic branding

== Sources ==
- This article incorporates text from a publication now in the public domain: Chisholm, Hugh, ed. (1911). "Branding". Encyclopædia Britannica (11th ed.). Cambridge University Press.
- Brand & Cauterize on EtymologyOnLine
- W. Andrews, Old Time Punishments (Hull, 1890)
- A. M. Earle, Curious Punishments of Bygone Days (London, 1896).
