= Anti-Vivisection Coalition =

British pressure group against animal testing

- Type: Pressure group
- Purpose: Opposition to animal testing
- Location: London, United Kingdom
- Region served: UK wide
- Key people: Danny Flies (Chairman); Sophie Kennerley (UK Coordinator); Dr Andre Menache (Scientific Consultant)
- Website: www.stopvivisection.org.uk

The Anti-Vivisection Coalition (AVC) is a United Kingdom-based pressure group which campaigns against animal testing. The AVC are described as 'main driver' of the Stop Vivisection Initiative, a petition launched in November 2012 which attracted more than a million signatures. The Stop Vivisection Initiative called upon the European Union to ban animal testing. If the signatures are verified, "the initiative will be granted hearings at the European Commission and the European Parliament".

== History ==
The AVC attracted local media attention in 2014 for protests against primate testing. The group launched an online petition against the use of taxpayer money for the UK Government funding of primate tests, signed by thousands of people, and criticised Newcastle University's Institute of Neuroscience for conducting experiments on macaques, calling for the UK Government to stop funding the experiments, and calling on Newcastle University to release the animals.

More than fifty people attended a protest outside of the National Institute for Biological Standards and Control in Potters Bar, which the AVC claims continues to test old drugs on animals unnecessarily. The National Institute, in response, described their experiments as "crucial". The AVC also campaigns against Cambridge University's experiments on primates. The group's efforts rejuvenated a prior campaign against the practice, stating:

"2014 marks 10 years since the British people spoke out against sickening primate experiments by stopping a new monkey laboratory being built in Cambridge. This was a call for change, but the government continues to present money from the very people who oppose these tests to fund the vivisectionists who undertake them."

University spokespeople rejected the calls from the AVC to stop the testing, with one saying that "Without animal research, which is only used when there is no alternative, many treatments we take for granted today would not be possible."

On 15 February 2014, members of the AVC gathered outside Senate House in Cambridge to campaign against the university's use of animal testing. The members wore red boiler suits and carried lit torches. A Spokesperson for AVC stated: "Our demonstration at the University of Cambridge was to show the public the sickening face of primate tests, where animals have had their skulls cut open and electrodes implanted into their brains." University spokespeople reiterated their support for animal testing, saying that it "offers the greatest hope of effective treatments for conditions such as cancer, Parkinson’s, multiple sclerosis, Alzheimer’s, strokes and transplants". In that month, the Anti-Vivisection Coalition also spoke out against experiments taking place at Harwell Science and Innovation Campus.

The group has not posted on Facebook since October 2015, and its website is no longer up. However, the Belgian/Dutch counterpart, Anti-Dierproeven Coalitie, remains active.

== See also ==
- Cruelty Free International
- List of animal rights groups
