= Rocky Mountain Animal Defense =

American nonprofit organization

- Abbreviation: RMAD
- Formation: 1994
- Type: Non-profit
- Legal status: Defunct
- Headquarters: Denver, Colorado

Rocky Mountain Animal Defense (RMAD) was a U.S.-based non-profit 501(c)(3) organization that helped eliminate the human-imposed suffering of animals in the Rocky Mountain region. The group was formed in 1994. RMAD furthered its mission through public education, community outreach, litigation, legislation and hands-on work. As of May, 2010, the group was renamed Rocky Mountain Justice for Animals under the leadership of Executive Director Karen Breslin.

== History ==
In 1993, an undercover exposé of conditions (Part 1, Part 2) was filmed at an intensive egg farm operation in Boulder, Colorado. Leveraging the publicity generated by the video, a small but dedicated group of volunteers banded together to form RMAD. Historically, volunteer effort has fueled the work of RMAD. Over the years, paid staff has been phased in to support these volunteers, conduct program work, and administer the organization.

== Funding ==
Approximately 75 percent of RMAD's funding came from individual contributions and membership dues. Approximately 20 percent came from foundations. The remaining 5 percent came from businesses and corporations. The organization devoted approximately 80 percent of its budget toward programs that directly supported education and advocacy efforts on behalf of animals. It used about 20 percent of its budget for administration and organizational development.

== See also ==
- List of animal rights groups
