= Animal welfare and rights in Canada =

Treatment of and laws concerning non-human animals in Canada

Animal welfare and rights in Canada is about the laws concerning and treatment of nonhuman animals in Canada. Canada has been considered to have weak animal welfare protections by the organization World Animal Protection. The vast majority of Canadians are for further animal protections, according to a poll conducted on behalf of Mercy for Animals.

== Legislation ==
Sections 444 to 447 of Canada's Criminal Code constitute Canada's primary federal animal protection legislation. The Code prohibits causing "unnecessary pain, suffering or injury to an animal or bird" and "causing damage or injury by wilful neglect".

The Criminal Code includes special protections for cattle, horses, mules, donkeys, pigs, sheep, and goats, but excludes chicken and fish, which make up the majority of animals raised and killed for food in Canada. The federal Health of Animals Act concerns the welfare of animals during transport and loading. This law prohibits overcrowding and sets a maximum amount of time that an animal can be transported without food, water, or rest: 52 hours for ruminants, 36 hours for monogastric animals. The federal Meat Inspection Act sets down regulations on inspections and slaughter. The law permits electric prods and does not require chickens and domesticated rabbits to be unconscious before slaughter.

Canadian provinces vary in their provisions for farm animal welfare. However, animal agriculture is generally exempt from anti-cruelty and duty of care provisions of provincial animal welfare legislation.

Animal testing for cosmetics was made illegal in 2023. In Ontario, Manitoba, Newfoundland, Labrador, Alberta, and Saskatchewan animals used in research are exempt from duty of care and/or prohibitions on causing distress.

In 2014 and again in 2020, Canada received a D out of possible grades A, B, C, D, E, F, G on World Animal Protection's Animal Protection Index.

== Animals used for food ==
=== Animal agriculture ===
In 2015, Canada slaughtered 660.96 million chickens, a steady increase from 621.82 million in 2007; 2.48 million cattle (on federally inspected farms), down from 3.61 million in 2004; and 20.41 million hogs. Statistics on the number of aquatic animals raised and killed are not forthcoming, but in 2010 Canadian aquaculture produced 160,924 tons of aquatic animals.

In 2014 Canada had 1.4 million head of dairy cattle. In 2014, there were 1007 registered egg farms in Canada with an average of 20,192 hens each, for a total of 20.33 million egg-laying hens. According to a 2012 document by the Society for the Prevention of Cruelty to Animals of British Columbia, 80% of Canadian egg-laying hens live in battery cages. In 2016 Egg Farmers of Canada pledged to phase out battery cages by 2036. As of 2024, 18% of Canadian egg production is cage-free, compared to 39% in the US and 77% in the UK.

In addition to battery cages, extreme confinement of calves in veal crates is legal in Canada, as is the removal of farm animal body parts (for instance, debeaking and castration) without anesthesia.

In 2014 the National Farm Animal Care Council, an industry body which lays down codes of practice for handling domestic animals, pledged to phase out the use of gestation crates by 2024. In 2020, the NFACC pushed back its commitment to 2029. Gestation crates in Canada are still widely used in pork production.

==== Vegetarianism and veganism ====
In a 2015 poll commissioned by the Vancouver Humane Society, 8% of 1507 respondents identified as vegetarian or mostly vegetarian and 25% said they are trying to eat less meat. 12% of respondents 18-34 identified as vegetarian or mostly pesco-vegetarian, as opposed to 5% of those 55 and up. The study did not measure the number of vegans. In 2018, A Dalhousie University study led by Sylvain Charlebois revealed that over 6.4 million Canadians limit the amount of meat they eat, and number will likely grow.

== Animal testing ==
According to the Canadian Council for Animal 2015 Animal Data Report, 3.57 million animals were used in experiments. 76,646 of these animals experienced "severe pain near, at, or above the pain tolerance threshold of unanesthetized conscious animals"

Testing cosmetics on animals was legal in Canada until 2023. In December 2015 a bill to ban testing cosmetics on animals as well as the sale of cosmetics tested on animals was introduced to the Canadian Senate. In 2023, cosmetic testing was banned.

== Animals used for clothing ==
In 2014, over 3 million animals were raised on 230 mink and 50 fox fur farms. No federal laws regulate fur farms specifically, and only Newfoundland and Labrador have enacted the National Farm Animal Care Council's codes of practice for mink and fox farming.

A particularly controversial animal issue in Canada is seal hunting, in which seals are killed for their fur and meat. The seals are killed by being clubbed or shot; however, evidence shows that many must be clubbed many times before death, are impaled with hooks and dragged while still conscious, and are hooked, knifed open, and skinned without being checked for consciousness. In 2015 the Canadian government authorized the killing of up to 468,000 seals.

== Animal activism ==
A number of major international animal welfare and rights groups are active in Canada, including Mercy for Animals (MFA), People for the Ethical Treatment of Animals, Direct Action Everywhere, and Humane Society International.

Canada also has homegrown animal activist groups. In 2010 Toronto Pig Save began the international Save Movement in which activists stop trucks transporting animals to slaughter and hold vigils for them. The Canadian Coalition for Farm Animals works to educate Canadians about farm animal welfare issues, promote reductions in the consumption of animal products, and push for legislative changes including bans on battery cages and gestation crates. Similar to the American Animal Legal Defense Fund, Canada's Animal Justice lobbies for stronger animal welfare legislation and litigates on behalf of animals. Canadian freelance journalist and animal advocate Jessica Scott-Reid, has written about animal rights and animal activism in Canada, for mainstream media since 2014.

Recent undercover investigations of animal farms in Canada include a 2014 MFA investigation of a dairy farm in British Columbia, in which workers were filmed kicking, beating, and hanging cows; a 2014 MFA investigation of a veal farm in Quebec where workers were filmed kicking, punching, and force-feeding calves, among other abuses; and a 2015 MFA investigation of a Hybrid Turkeys farm in which workers were filmed kicking and throwing turkeys, crushing their spines with bolt cutters, and beating them with shovels and metal rods, leaving them to die slowly. Following the investigation Hybrid Turkeys was found guilty of animal cruelty and fined 5,600 Canadian dollars.

== Canadian Activism in Film ==
Canadian filmmaker Fern Levitt examined the treatment of working animals in her 2016 documentary Sled Dogs, which investigated the Iditarod and commercial dog-sledding operations in Canada and the United States. The film presented allegations concerning the chaining, mistreatment and killing of sled dogs. Levitt and People for the Ethical Treatment of Animals stated that the documentary contributed to Wells Fargo’s decision to withdraw its sponsorship of the Iditarod.

In 2025, Levitt produced another documentary, titled, Lucy: The Stolen Lives of Elephants. Centred on Lucy, an Asian elephant kept at the Edmonton Valley Zoo, the film examines the physical and psychological effects of elephant captivity and contrasts zoo environments with natural habitats and sanctuaries. Levitt provided material from the production in support of the Senate’s consideration of Bill S-15, which proposed restrictions on elephant and great-ape captivity.

In an August 2026 opinion article for The Globe and Mail, Levitt called for the bill to be reintroduced and argued that Canada could set an international example by strengthening protections for captive wildlife. Levitt argued that the legislation could make Canada the first country to establish a legal phase-out of elephant and great-ape captivity while introducing some of the world’s strongest protections for captive great apes.

The proposed Bill S-15 introduces new offences into the Canadian Criminal Code to ban the use of these animals in public entertainment and halts new captivity unless explicitly licensed for a strict animal welfare, scientific, or conservation case. Bill S-15 was stalled in 2025. Levitt's Op-ed mentions her hope that it will be passed by the end of 2026.

== Disaster response ==
Following the 2021 Abbotsford floods, "the largest-ever agricultural and animal welfare disaster in B.C. history", there has been renewed attention on disaster management as an aspect of animal welfare in Canada. In 2023, British Columbia passed the Emergency and Disaster Management Act, which includes animals in risk assessments and evacuation plans.

== See also ==
- List of animal rights advocates
- Timeline of animal welfare and rights
- Timeline of animal welfare and rights in the United States
- Timeline of animal welfare and rights in Europe
- Abolitionism (animal rights)
- Universal Declaration on Animal Welfare
