= Ronnie Lee =

British animal rights activist

- Born: 1951 (age 74–75)

Ronnie Lee (born 1951) is a British animal rights activist. He is known primarily for being the Press Officer for the UK Animal Liberation Front (ALF) in 1976. He also founded the magazine Arkangel in 1989.

== Founding the ALF ==
Lee was a member of the Hunt Saboteurs Association (HSA) in the 1970s, and formed an offshoot of it, which he called the Band of Mercy. The original Band of Mercy was started by a group of activists in England in 1824 to thwart fox hunting by laying false scents and blowing hunting horns. Lee and another activist, Cliff Goodman, revived the name in 1972, and set about attacking hunters' vehicles. They progressed to attacking pharmaceutical laboratories and seal-hunting boats, and on 10 November 1973, they set fire to a building in Milton Keynes with the aim of making insurance prohibitive for what they saw as industries that exploit animals, a strategy the ALF continues to pursue.

In August 1974, Lee and Goodman were arrested for taking part in a raid on Oxford Laboratory Animal Colonies in Bicester, which earned them the name the "Bicester Two". Daily demonstrations took place outside the court during their trial, with Lee's local Labour MP, Ivor Clemitson among the demonstrators. They were sentenced to three years in prison, during which Lee went on the movement's first hunger strike to obtain vegan food and clothing. Paroled after 12 months, Lee emerged more militant than before, and organised 30 activists to set up a new liberation campaign. Seeking a campaign name that would "haunt" those who used animals, he chose the Animal Liberation Front.

== "Valerie's" story ==
In Free the Animals (2000), Ingrid Newkirk, the president of People for the Ethical Treatment of Animals (PETA), tells what purports to be the true story of one of the first ALF activists to set up a cell in the United States, and how she was helped by Lee. The activist, named "Valerie" by Newkirk, flew to London in the early 1980s to seek Lee's help. She made contact with him by making an appointment to interview Kim Stallwood, then the executive director of the British Union for the Abolition of Vivisection (BUAV), and later executive director of PETA. Valerie pretended she was writing an article about animal rights, and asked Stallwood whether he knew how to contact Lee, as she wanted to interview him too. Stallwood told her BUAV allowed Lee's "volunteers" to use an office in the BUAV building, because Lee had just been released from prison. Stallwood made it clear that Lee and the BUAV did not agree on the merits of direct action.

Newkirk describes how Stallwood introduced Valerie to Lee in a nearby pub. Before agreeing to speak to her, Lee asked Valerie to hand over her wallet, the contents of which he checked, take off her jacket, stand up, and lift her shirt over her stomach. When he was satisfied that she was not recording the conversation, he told her he could arrange for her to join an ALF activist training course in the north of England. When they parted, he declined to shake hands with her, because he said he couldn't afford to be seen doing anything that looked as though he was sealing a deal. "What you do is our handshake," he told Valerie. Newkirk describes how the participants in the training course did not know each other's real names, using code names throughout, with Lee being the only person who knew everyone's identity.

Logo of the Animal Liberation Front

== Imprisonment ==
Lee became the ALF's full-time press officer in the 1980s, and was sentenced in connection with this to ten years imprisonment in 1986. While in prison, he founded Arkangel, the animal liberation magazine. During this time he furthered his education by learning foreign languages. He was released in 1992 after serving six years and eight months.

== Beliefs ==
Lee has written that animal liberation requires widespread, radical changes in the way human beings live.

True animal liberation will not come merely through the destruction of the Dachaus and Buchenwalds that the occupiers have built for their victims, but demands nothing less than the driving back of the human species to pre-invasion boundaries. So, in practical terms, what does this mean? It means the end of environmental pollution and the industrial society which causes it. The end of such things as the private car. The end of methods of agriculture relying on pesticides, artificial fertilizers and other poisons. The end of cities and vast urban conurbations, which are like deserts to most wild animal species. The end of large-scale farming which provides little habitat for them either. And perhaps above all, a drastic cut in the number of the human species. The radical American environmental group Earth First! has estimated that the right level of human population world wide should be about 50 million. Today more than that number live just in Britain.

== Current activism ==
Lee is reported to maintain a low profile in England. His participation in the animal liberation movement includes making public statements in response to news stories about ALF actions, expressing views that are frequently more militant than those expressed officially by the Animal Liberation Press Office. For example, he issued a statement in 2001 openly condoning an armed assault on an executive of Huntingdon Life Sciences, the subject of an international animal-rights campaign called Stop Huntingdon Animal Cruelty (SHAC), which ALF activists are believed to be involved in.

Ronnie Lee put in an appearance in disguise in the 2006 documentary about the ALF 'Behind the Mask' where he again expressed radical views about violence towards people he perceived as animal abusers. Under the pseudonym of Tony Peters, Lee founded the anti greyhound racing group Greyhound Action, which folded in 2011.

=== Vegan advocacy ===
Ronnie Lee was a guest of Animal Rights Zone (ARZone), appearing as a live guest on the global animal rights social network, which is transcribed on the online site.

=== Green Party ===
Lee has become an active member of the Green Party of England and Wales and has co-founded a group called Greens For Animal Protection, for members of the Green Party who campaign on animal issues.

== See also ==
- Animal Liberation Front Supporters Group (ALFSG)
- Hunt Saboteurs Association (HSA)
- Animal testing
- List of animal rights advocates
