= HAYTAP =

Turkish animal rights organization

HAYTAP, the Animal Rights Federation in Turkey
- Founded: July 2008
- Type: Non-governmental organization
- Purpose: Animal rights
- Location: Istanbul
- Website: haytap.org

HAYTAP (HAYTAP) is an animal rights federation in Turkey (Turkish: Hayvan Hakları Federasyonu). It is an animal rights organization and a federation of such organisations based in Istanbul, currently led by Ahmet Kemal Şenpolat.

HAYTAP unified all animal rights associations and organizations under one name. Created in 2008, HAYTAP raises awareness of the violation of animal rights. It reaches out to the Turkish Parliament through court trials, engages in training activities such as education programs in schools, and uses public relations to spread its message.

HAYTAP's main lobbying concern is to change the laws in Turkey regarding cruelty to animals. It believes that the present law, Animal Protection Law No.5199, does not provide for strong enough punishment for animal abusers. Under Turkey's law no. 5199, cruelty to animals is considered a misdemeanor, punishable by a fine, with no jail time and no mark on one's criminal record.

== History ==
HAYTAP resulted from the merger of five animal rights organizations in Turkey in July 2008 and the number of registered members has reached 21 associations, including one from Azerbaijan, and 61 representatives. It claims to be the largest and the best organised animal rights organization in Turkey.

== Philosophy ==
HAYTAP supports local ecological integrity and economic needs in the areas of habitat loss and prevention. It lobbies for the ratification of international agreements and for creation of legal and institutional infrastructure.

HAYTAP raises public awareness of the violation of nature and animal rights, files suits regarding current abuses, is involved in training activities, conducts public relations exercises and tries to get laws applied in a better way. Its slogan is Life is in your hands.

== Campaigns ==
HAYTAP rejects the idea of animals as property, and opposes the use of animals in any form: It is against raising animals for their furs, selling them as pets, hunting them and making them a trade commodity. It promotes a vegan diet.

HAYTAP supports the presence of stray animals at a tolerable level and the appropriate prevention of strays.

HAYTAP opposes animal fighting, seal hunting, bullfighting and works to stop the use and abuse of animals in certain display contexts like zoos, circuses dolphinariums and roadside exhibits.

Through posters, HAYTAP attempts to draw public attention to animal rights issues like abandoned pets, street dogs and cats, roadkill, fur clothing, emotion in animals, anti-hunting and captive animals in zoos, circuses and dolphinariums.

HAYTAP advises municipalities and governments on legislation to improve animal rights. It met Turkish prime minister Recep Tayyip Erdoğan in February 2011 and obtained his commitment to take action regarding animal rights.

== See also ==
- List of animal rights groups
