= Every Animal =

Ukrainian vegan animal rights organization

- Founded: October 2019; 7 years ago
- Type: Community organization
- Purpose: Promoting veganism
- Location: Ukraine
- Method: Information, support, campaigns
- Leader: Tamara Human
- Website: www.everyanimal.org

Every Animal (Ukrainian: Кожна Тварина) is a vegan animal rights organization in Ukraine.

== History ==
Every Animal was founded in 2019 with the aim of popularizing veganism and forming a movement for animal rights. By 2023, more than 100 activists had joined the organization, more than 50 educational events were held, and more than 62,000 free vegan lunches were distributed.

The organization arranges educational events of various formats, such as lectures, trainings, meetings, discussions, and screenings of documentaries, and has its own charity merchandise.

Before the full-scale Russian invasion of Ukraine, street actions called “Open your eyes” were regularly organized in various cities of Ukraine. During these, some activists held TV screens with documentary footage about animal cruelty in the meat, dairy, egg, and fur industries while others talked to passers-by about veganism.

On August 11, 2020, the organization launched a free weekly seven-day online course on veganism for beginners called “Vegan Express”. The course is divided into lessons that contain an overview of industries that exploit animals, tips on transitioning to a vegan lifestyle, selection of ethical products, plant-based recipes for the day, and answers to the most common questions. As of February 2023, 98 courses were held, where more than 8,600 people participated.

In the summer of 2021, the organization visited ten Ukrainian cities as a part of a Vegan Tour. During the campaign, they organized screenings of the 2018 documentary "Dominion", lectures on veganism, activist-focused workshops, "Open your eyes" and "Look at the world through their eyes" actions, and a sampling of plant-based products. As part of the "Look at the world through their eyes" action, visitors were offered to see animal industries through the eyes of farm animals using virtual reality goggles.

In December 2021, they published the first children's book about veganism in Ukrainian called "Hands, paws, or hooves" (Ukrainian: “Руки, лапи чи копита”). With the support of the Supreme Master Ching Hai Association, four thousand copies of the book were distributed to immigrant children in Poland, as well as to children in Bucha, Kyiv Oblast, where Every Animal organized a charity event in September 2022. The book is also distributed in some Ukrainian children's libraries.

With the start of the Russian invasion of Ukraine in 2022, they have actively supported vegans that serve in the Armed Forces of Ukraine by sending them vegan food. They created the Vegan Kitchen of Ukraine project, which provides free vegan meals to forcibly displaced people, volunteers, and servicemen of the Territorial Defense Forces. As of February 2023, more than 62,000 free vegan lunches were distributed and 760 parcels were sent to vegans in the Armed Forces of Ukraine.

In the fall of 2022, a lecture on veganism and sports was held, as well as two charity festivals called “Vegan Weekend” in Kyiv. At these events, the organization raised funds to support the Armed Forces of Ukraine.
