= Kranjec =

Kranjec is a Slovene surname. Notable people with the surname include:

- David Kranjec (born 1994), Slovene-Australian figure skater
- Igor Kranjec (born 1972), Slovene cyclist
- Marko Kranjec (born 1940), Slovene politician
- Miško Kranjec (1908–1983), Slovene writer
- Robert Kranjec (born 1981), Slovene ski jumper
- Žan Kranjec (born 1992), Slovene ski racer
