= Arkangel (magazine) =

British animal rights magazine

Arkangel: for animal liberation
- Editor: Ronnie Lee
- Editor: Vivien Smith
- Format: 30cm
- Founded: 1989
- First issue: Winter 1989
- Final issue: 2007
- Country: England
- ISSN: 0969-207X

Arkangel Magazine #29. The front cover features the image of a macaque with the word "crap" written on his head, taken during a daylight raid by the Animal Liberation League, inside a Royal College of Surgeons (RCS) research facility in Kent, England, 1984.

Arkangel was a British-based bi-annual animal liberation magazine, first published in the winter of 1989. The magazine, which was sold internationally, covered global aspects of underground and overground animal rights campaigning, and promoted a vegan lifestyle. The magazine ceased publication around 2007, with issue #31.

The magazine was the idea of Ronnie Lee, the founder of the Animal Liberation Front (ALF). While in prison, he regularly received letters of support and details of unreported actions by ALF activists. Lee decided to publish these in the form of a magazine, with the first edition put together by Vivian Smith. The magazine continued to be written largely by activists associated with the British ALF.

== See also ==
- Bite Back
- No Compromise
