= CAS International =

International non-profit advocacy group

Adrian MAM (Comité Anti Stierenvechten)
- Founded: 1993
- Type: NGO
- Purpose: Anti-bullfighting
- Location: Utrecht, the Netherlands
- Members: 14,000
- Website: http://cas-international.org

CAS International is an international non-profit advocacy group which aims to end bullfighting. CAS International was founded in 1993 as Comité Anti Stierenvechten, with the help of ADDA from Barcelona, Spain, De Dierenbescherming (Dutch Society for the Protection of Animals) and the international animal welfare organisation WSPA originally aimed at stopping Dutch tourists from going to bullfighting.

In 2008 the name Comité Anti Stierenvechten was changed to CAS International because its original goal had been achieved: the majority of Dutch tourists do not visit bullfights and Dutch travel organisations do not promote bullfighting any more. The name change reflects the current scope of activities that have gradually changed to international campaigning in close cooperation with anti-bullfighting organisations in Europe and Latin America.

It is the largest organisation exclusively dedicated to the abolition of bullfighting everywhere in the world, and according to their website, they have 14,000 members. CAS International has its head office in the Netherlands, and has a branch office in Belgium.

== See also ==
- Anti-Bullfighting City
- Animal ethics
- Animal rights
- Animal welfare
- Cruelty to animals
- List of animal rights groups
