= British Columbia Society for the Prevention of Cruelty to Animals =

Canadian animal welfare charity

The British Columbia Society for the Prevention of Cruelty to Animals
- Abbreviation: BC SPCA
- Founded: 1896; 130 years ago
- Type: Charitable organization
- Registration no.: 118819036RR0001
- Purpose: Animal welfare, education and enforcement
- Headquarters: 1245 East 7th Avenue; Vancouver, B.C. V5T 1R1
- Locations: 42 Shelters: 5 Animal hospitals/clinics; Wildlife Rehabilitation Centre
- Region served: British Columbia, Canada
- Key people: Craig Daniell (CEO)
- Subsidiaries: BC Pet Registry
- Revenue: CA$35,114,749 (2016)
- Expenses: CA$33,183,436 (2016)
- Staff: 551 (2017)
- Volunteers: Approx. 5500 (2017)
- Website: spca.bc.ca

The British Columbia Society for the Prevention of Cruelty to Animals (BC SPCA) is a non-profit animal welfare organization which advocates for animal protection legislation, operates animal shelters, and runs educational workshops and public awareness programs throughout British Columbia, Canada. Founded in 1896, it is a registered charitable organization and one of the largest such animal welfare organizations in North America. As of 2017, BC SPCA had 36 branches, over 500 staff members, nearly 5500 volunteers, operated 5 veterinary hospitals/clinics and a wildlife rehabilitation centre, and sheltered more than 22000 animals. It is also one of the few animal welfare organizations to monitor animals in film.

== History ==
In 1895, the British Columbia Society for the Prevention of Cruelty to Animals Act was enacted in British Columbia, bringing the BC SPCA into existence. The act authorized the establishment of the BC SPCA to investigate offences involving cruelty to animals and to take action to rescue captive animals in distress. BC SPCA formally began operating in 1896 and its first meeting was held at New Westminster. By 1901, the organization had more than 10 branches spread across various cities of British Columbia. Beyond law enforcement, the society's primary aims were to educate the public and advocate for an end to practices causing suffering for animals. This was the business of the BC SPCA until it elected to open its first animal shelter in 1955 in Vancouver.

== Activities ==
Being the only animal welfare organization in British Columbia that is authorized to enforce animal cruelty laws, BC SPCA operates a Cruelty Investigations Department that investigates reports of cruelty towards animals, rescues animals if they are found to be subject to distress, and if required, initiates legal proceedings against perpetrators of acts of cruelty by making recommendations to Crown Council to prosecute. Punishments handed out by the court to persons found guilty in such cases range from revoking permission to own animals to fines and imprisonment. In February 2016, the BC SPCA seized 66 animals from a puppy mill in Langley, one of the largest seizures in the province's history.

BC SPCA provides medical care to animals through five veterinary practices, including three full-service veterinary hospitals and two spay/neuter clinics launched to reduce pet overpopulation. The society operates a range other facilities including community animal centres (a new model of animal shelter) and store-front education and adoption centres which offer youth education programming and adoptions of cats and small animals. Many of these locations extend their emergency services to injured pets, and may also provide short-term care for pets whose owners are in a crisis situation. Also, it monitors the use of animals in the film industry.

=== Funding ===
BC SPCA is a not-for-profit charitable society and relies largely on donations from the public and government grants for its funding.

According to its website, BC SPCA spends approximately $2.5 million per year on animal cruelty investigations, an activity for which it does not receive any government funding and relies solely on public donations.

Every September, the organizations conducts Paws for a Cause walks throughout British Columbia for fundraising.
