= Anita Krajnc case =

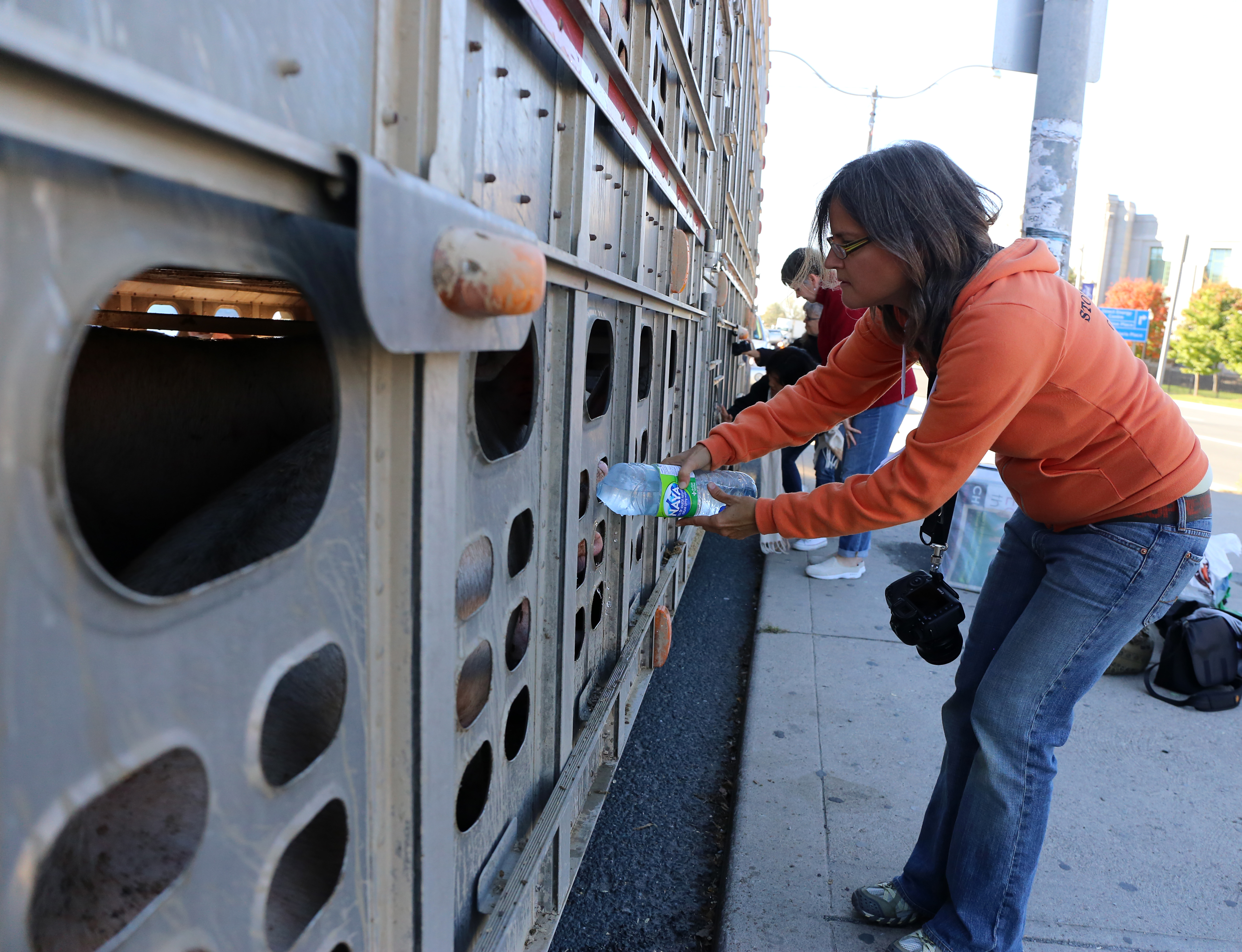
At a Toronto Pig Save vigil: Anita Krajnc giving water to pigs on their way to slaughter.

On June 22, 2015, Toronto resident Anita Krajnc gave water to pigs in a slaughter truck on the way to Fearman's Pork Inc. slaughterhouse in Burlington, Ontario. She was charged with criminal mischief, but was found not guilty on May 4, 2017.

== Background ==
Anita Krajnc is a co-founder of Toronto Pig Save. She holds a PhD in political science from the University of Toronto. Her doctoral thesis was based on the role of scientific knowledge and public education in building international environmental regimes. Krajnc has been Assistant Professor at Queen's University. She has also been a media democracy activist and a writer. She was an aide to Charles Caccia, former Minister of Environment.

== Incident ==
The related incident occurred on June 22, 2015, outside Fearman's Pork Inc. slaughterhouse in Burlington. The protest was undertaken by Toronto Pig Save, a group to which Krajnc, who is described as an animal rights activist, belongs. Krajnc and her group were providing water to pigs in trucks transporting them to slaughter, as they stopped at a traffic island at the intersection of Appleby Line and Harvester Road, through the vents on the sides of the truck. As they were doing so, a driver of one of the trucks, got down and went to her and asked her to stop. Krajnc recited a verse from the biblical Book of Proverbs: "If they are thirsty, give them water". In response the driver told her that the pigs weren't human. Krajnc asked the driver to be compassionate; he said he would call the police, Krajnc suggested that she would call Jesus. The driver then walked away, boarded the truck and drove on. This interaction was filmed by Krajnc's associates. The police report on the incident described the contents of the bottle as "an unknown liquid".

On June 23, 2015, Eric van Boekel, from whose farm the pigs were brought, filed a case against Krajnc. On September 9, 2015, Krajnc was charged with criminal mischief, the penalty for which ranges from a fine to 10 years in prison. In response, the group arranged a vigil on September 24. On October 14, 2015, Krajnc appeared in court for an arraignment, to have charges read to her. In the context of the case The Daily Telegraph reports that under Canadian law pigs are considered property and can be transported without food and water for 36 hours. Krajnc has said that she would refuse to pay any fine and that she was willing to suffer imprisonment.

The driver of the truck stated that though the activists were entitled to protest, his objection was to them interfering with his delivery and touching his truck (which may jeopardise the protester's own safety). He considers the charges justifiable. He said that the pigs were loaded an hour before the incident and argued that it was unlikely they were dehydrated. Metro printed a rebuttal from Bob Comis, a former breeder who stated that the pigs as seen in a video of the incident showed symptoms of "severe heat stress". Eric van Boekel, in support of his complaint, said, "They don't have the right to involve other people's property and they don't have the right to protest illegally". He stated that rules set by pig breeders regarding food and water were followed by his operations.

Krajnc has stated that treating living animals such as pigs as property – "no different than a toaster" – is the focal issue of the matter and that being compassionate to them should not be considered criminal.

== Trial ==
The case was heard in the Ontario Superior Court of Justice and presided over by Justice David Harris. Closing arguments in the trial were made on March 9, 2017.

Justice David Harris found Krajnc not guilty of criminal mischief on May 4, 2017, judging that a crime had not occurred because simply giving water to the pigs did not constitute interference "with the operation, enjoyment or use of" the pigs by their owners as argued by the Crown. Harris also dismissed the argument that Krajnc's actions created a safety risk via possible contamination, finding that the driver had delivered the pigs immediately afterwards with no mention of the incident because he did not think there was a real risk and that in the past, despite knowing that the pigs had been given water, abattoirs had never refused them.

Harris dismissed the testimony of two defendant's expert witnesses as unobjective and also found that one of them had been "less than scientific". He chastised the defence team for making attention-grabbing statements comparing Krajnc to Mandela, Gandhi, Susan B. Anthony, and those who had helped Jews during the Holocaust.

== Reactions ==
Several online petitions sprung up including one called Compassion Isn't a Crime that had 125,500 signatures, and another asking the Ontario Court of Justice to drop charges against Krajnc had over 24,000. The Daily Telegraph called Krajnc's case "a cause célèbre for animal welfare activists".

== Other incidents ==
On October 4, 2016, Krajnc was arrested on charges of obstructing police and breaching her bail conditions for the 2015 incident, after a truck heading to the slaughterhouse overturned. Police had taped off part of the street and Krajnc was arrested after she "walked past the police tape more than once, and did not follow police directions to stop what she was doing".

In June 2020, Regan Russell was killed by an animal transport truck while attending one of Krajnc's Toronto Pig Save protests at the same slaughterhouse.
