= Animal Rights Cambridge =

English animal rights organisation

Animal Rights Cambridge is an animal rights group based in Cambridge, England, founded in 1978. The group claims to be the longest standing local animal rights group in the UK.

Animal Rights Cambridge opposes all forms of animal exploitation. The group have been involved in protests against foie gras and animal testing.
