= Western Animal Rights Network =

The Western Animal Rights Network (WARN) first appeared in 2005 as a coalition for animal rights groups in the West of England and South Wales and acted as a news service for animal rights demos and action reports.

It re-launched in August 2007 and continued to work towards total animal liberation using direct action and protests to fulfil this goal. There was also an expansion to include not just South Wales but all of Wales, providing the country with its first animal rights national group.

The website is also used by the Animal Liberation Front (ALF) in the same way the international group use the magazine Bite Back to anonymously report their criminal activities. Under a disclaimer stating that the network does not "encourage any illegal activities", the group publishes claims of various forms of illegal liberation and vandalism, including acts against McDonald's, KFC and the property of hunters.

== Campaigns and actions ==
=== Stop Sequani Animal Testing ===
==== Sean Kirtley ====
Following the arrests of the Stop Sequani Animal Testing (SSAT) campaigners in May 2006, when 13 animal rights activists were arrested under the Serious Organised Crime and Police Act 2005 (SOCPA), WARN supported six of the activists who had the most serious charges against them. Similar to the SHAC 7, six individuals who received jail sentences in the United Kingdom of between 3–6 years for using their website to "incite attacks" on those who did business with Huntingdon Life Sciences, the campaigners have been called the Sequani Six after a seventh accepted a plea bargain. in 2008, Sean Kirtley was jailed for four and a half years for a sustained protest campaign and David Griffiths received a 30-week prison sentence, both for conspiracy to interfere with the contractual relationships of an animal research organisation.

==== December March 2007 ====
On 15 December, approximately 100–150 demonstrators marched against Sequani Ltd in Ledbury town centre. Section 12 and Section 14 of the Public Order Act were applied to limit the number of protesters then going to the laboratory to a maximum of fifteen. A spokesperson for WARN argued that the policing was heavy-handed, resulting in a female protester thrown back by police for distributing leaflets.

During the march, activists attempted to blockade a road near the High Street, in solidarity with the Sequani Six. Two activists were arrested for trying to D-lock themselves together, whilst another three locked together using arm tubes, which were then eventually cut to release the individuals. The five were arrested and released on bail later that evening until February 2008.

==== Carnival Against Vivisection ====
It was promoted by various sources, through local media, activist based, and by the network, that a Carnival Against Vivisection was to be held in Ledbury, without an original source for the organising of the event. As the police called for organisers to step forward and reveal their identities, protesters said they were demonstrating in solidarity with Sean Kirtley, who was sentenced to prison in May for his part in the campaign against Sequani laboratories, including the organising of marches with police.

On the day of action 200 activists marched through Ledbury, many wearing black and green, with others beating drums, waving flags and sounding airhorns.

=== Sun Valley chicken rescue ===
On 7 January, WARN reported that a chicken named Rocky was "rescued" from Uphampton Farm, Shobdon, Herefordshire at the second biggest poultry slaughterhouse in the UK. This was in response to the recent high-profile campaign on the television by Hugh Fearnley-Whittingstall and Jamie Oliver who showed their concern at some of aspects of the farming industry, including Sun Valley Foods, the supplier where the bird was taken from. The activists claimed to have avoided the security checkpoint, by hiding behind a transport lorry, in order to investigate the conditions that Compassion in World Farming said were poor at the site in Shobdon.

The group said the conditions were so bad, that instead an individual took an opportunity to rescue a chicken, which was named Rocky, after the film Chicken Run, he was then allegedly chased by four security guards and a van, but escaped. One male was arrested and released later that night on bail for attempted burglary, the police spokesman confirmed this and said that they were still looking for another man in connection with the offence. Sun Valley refuted the allegations of cruelty and bad conditions saying that the responsibility they have towards animal welfare is very serious, with employees trained to ensure the highest standards possible. The activists involved have since had all charges dropped and no further action is to be taken by West Mercia Police.

== See also ==
- Stop Huntingdon Animal Cruelty (SHAC)
- SPEAK
- Animal Liberation Front (ALF)
- Animal liberation movement
- Leaderless resistance
- Animal rights
- Animal testing
- List of animal rights groups
