= Kranjc =

Kranjc may refer to:

== People ==
- Aleš Kranjc (b. 1981), Slovenian ice hockey player
- Mladen Kranjc (1944-1988), Slovenian football player
- Matija Kranjc (b. 1984), Slovenian javelin thrower

== Other ==
- 7516 Kranjc, main-belt asteroid
