= Animal Liberation Leagues =

Animal rights activist organisations campaigning against animal exploitation

Animal Liberation Leagues were a network of animal rights organizations active in the UK in the 1980s. Whereas the Animal Liberation Front specialized in clandestine activity, mainly masked, at night, and involving small numbers of people, the Animal Liberation Leagues consisted of coordinated raids, or 'invasions', by a large number of people, mainly carried out during the day. One journalist described the Animal Liberation Leagues as "a sophisticated...development in the move to direct action". Raids were often carried out at the same time as legal demonstrations.

== Central Animal Liberation League ==
The Central Animal Liberation League (CALL) was an animal rights organisation based in central England that was active during the 1980s. Over a hundred animals were taken by this organisation, mainly from centres of animal experimentation. They also took documentation and video footage. The slogan of the CALL was "Through The Door When They Least Expect It".

- A fifteen-year-old rhesus monkey called Beatrice was the only monkey ever to be taken from a UK laboratory, by CALL. She had been used in arthritis research.
- Guinea pigs used in burn experiments were taken from a laboratory in Birmingham by CALL activists posing as window cleaners.
- A raid on the premises of Animal Supplies London Ltd netted van loads of documentation and found a fridge filled with decapitated monkey heads and bats.
- Video footage taken at Oxford University Park Farm showed rhesus monkeys that had been used in eye experiments.
- Experiments on rats, pigs, mice, rabbits, ferrets, polecats, primates, pigeons and sheep were filmed at the John Radcliffe Hospital in Oxford.
- Roebuck Farm in Hertfordshire was raided in 1986. Documentation taken from here revealed that primates had been supplied by Windsor Safari Park, Chessington Zoo, and Ravenstone Zoo for use in experiments at places like Huntingdon Life Sciences.

== Eastern Animal Liberation League ==
The Eastern Animal Liberation League (EALL) was based in the East of England.

The main action of the EALL took place in August 1984. Unilever research laboratories in Bedford was stormed by over two hundred animal rights activists and the same time as a legal demonstration was taking place at the front. 25 people were later convicted of conspiracy to burgle and sentenced to a total of 41 years.

One of those convicted was Jill Phipps, who was killed in 1995 during a demonstration, when she was run over by a lorry carrying calves for the live export trade. Jill, along with her mother Nancy Phipps, and her sister Lesley Phipps, were all convicted in the Unilever case. Jill's sentence was suspended because she had gotten pregnant, but her mother and sister were sent to HM Prison Holloway.

These heavy losses to the animal rights movement led to the winding up of the EALL and a change in tactics.

== Northern Animal Liberation League ==
The Northern Animal Liberation League was active in the north of England. Their campaigning slogan was, "Over the wall when they least expect it". It specialised in mass daytime invasion of places such as animal laboratories to obtain photographs and other information, and in some cases animals were also removed.

- In 1980, over a hundred animal rights activists invaded Babraham Agricultural Research Centre in Cambridge. They witnessed sights such as pigs with electrodes in their brains, cows with windows on the side of their stomachs and goats with udders grafted onto their necks. Eighteen people were arrested. Footage and media coverage of this raid is credited as a major expose of the vivisection industry.
- Several dogs were removed from the University of Sheffield by the NALL in 1980. In the publicity that followed, one dog in particular known as Blackie was recognised by her former owners and reunited with them.
- In April 1984, three hundred NALL activists stormed the ICI laboratories at Alderley Edge in Cheshire. Several people were arrested and two imprisoned.

== South East Animal Liberation League ==
This image of a monkey with the word "crap" tattooed on his head was taken during a daylight raid in 1984 by the South East Animal Liberation League, from a Royal College of Surgeons (RCS) research facility in Kent. The BUAV prosecuted the RCS in connection with material found during the raid, leading to a £250 fine, overturned on appeal.

The South East Animal Liberation League (SEALL) existed in the southeast of England. It specialised in mass daylight raids of places such as animal research laboratories.

- In 1983 there was a mass invasion of the Wellcome laboratories at Dartford, Kent. Offices were broken into and documents removed, but because the company wanted to avoid further publicity, no one was charged.
- In August 1984, sixty SEALL activists carried out a daylight raid on the Buxton Brown Research Farm of the Royal College of Surgeons (RCS), located in the village of Downe in the London Borough of Bromley. They uncovered details of dental and diet experiments being carried out on monkeys and other animals. Information obtained led to the Royal College of Surgeons being prosecuted by the British Union for the Abolition of Vivisection for causing unnecessary suffering to a ten-year-old macaque monkey called Mone. They were fined £250. In order to obtain the prosecution, activist Mike Huskisson had to admit to being present on the day and witnessing the documents being removed. He was sentenced to prison for eighteen months. The RCS's conviction was later overturned on a technicality.
- Shamrock Farm, which imported primates for experiments was the focus of a SEALL campaign.
- The University of Surrey was raided by SEALL, but the only conviction was of a woman who had taken out a dog from the laboratory.
- In October 1984, SEALL carried out three simultaneous raids on animal laboratories in Hampshire. Due to their previous successes, the police had the group under surveillance and were more prepared. Activists turned up at APT Consultancy, Cottagepatch Kennels, and Wickham Laboratories. It achieved widespread press coverage and nineteen people were arrested and charged, dubbed the "Wickham 19". Seven of them were later imprisoned, for sentences of up to three years. This caused the SEALL to disband.

== See also ==
- Leaderless resistance
- Western Animal Rights Network (WARN)
- List of animal rights groups
