= InterNICHE =

British non-profit organization

- Formation: 1988
- Location: Leicester, England
- Co-ordinator: Nick Jukes
- Website: interniche.org

InterNICHE (International Network for Humane Education; /ˈɪntərniːʃ/ IN-tər-neesh), is a non-profit organization and an international network based in the United Kingdom that promotes the use of humane alternatives within biological science and veterinary medical education globally. The network is composed of campaigners, students, teachers and trainers.

== Resource ==
Resources developed by InterNICHE to highlight alternatives in biological sciences of the multi-language book From Guinea Pig to Computer Mouse (2003), several Alternative Loan Systems, the Humane Education Award. The organization also has a website www.interniche.org, conferences, outreach visits and training around the world.

== See also ==
- Alternatives to animal testing

== Sources ==
- Patricia Ann Owens. Encyclopedia of animal rights and animal welfare. School Library Journal. vol. 56 iss. 4 p. 10.
