= Vegetarian ecofeminism =

Feminism and vegetarianism

Vegetarian ecofeminism is a branch within the field of ecofeminism, which examines the connection between the oppression of women and the oppression of nature. Vegetarian ecofeminism extends beyond ecofeminism because it believes that the way in which humans exploit and kill animals should be distinctly recognized, and that the oppression of humans is linked to the oppression of animals.

Vegetarian ecofeminists integrate the consideration of nonhuman animals in their analyses, along with race, class, gender, and nature. Through the concept known as intersectionality, it is recognized that sexism, racism, classism, heterosexism and other forms of inter human discrimination are all connected.

The concept of speciesism is central to distinguishing between vegetarian ecofeminism and ecofeminism, and it strongly links the hierarchies created among animals to the hierarchies created among humans. Distinguishing between ecofeminism and vegetarian ecofeminism is important because of vegetarian ecofeminism's focus on the oppression of animals provides connections between the other linked forms of oppression, but specifically the oppression of women.

== Speciesism ==
Speciesism is a form of oppression central to the ecofeminist concept, and the belief that speciesism is a valid form of oppression that must be eradicated is at the center of most vegetarian ecofeminist arguments. It is used to support the exploitation and killing of nonhuman animals. Much like any other form of oppression, speciesism is a social construction that benefits the dominant at the expense of the oppressed.

=== Humanism in opposition to vegetarian ecofeminism ===
Humanists believe that speciesism is not a "bad -ism" like racism or sexism, because while women, people of color, and any other group of oppressed humans are moral humans, nonhuman animals are not and therefore do not deserve the same rights. According to humanism, the domination of humans over animals is justified, and animals are indeed meant for human consumption. Human rights are inherently more important than animal rights because their biological differences from human makes them morally different as well.

Vegetarian ecofeminists argue that there is an inherent bond between humans and nonhuman animals, and the human supremacy and degradation of animals that ensues is a social construction meant to undermine the human-animal bond. It is in fact not the characteristic of an abnormal few who care and empathize with nonhuman animals, but the normal state for most humans. This is exemplified by the cross-cultural practice of pet-keeping or the usage of animals in therapy, which demonstrate the strength of the bond between humans and animals. The act of expiation in which humans justify the act of killing nonhuman animals shows that humans are inclined not to harm animals, otherwise there would not need to be any mechanisms created cross-culturally to help deal with the guilt felt in killing animals.

=== Hierarchies ===
The hierarchy created among nonhuman animals validates the hierarchies created among humans. Humans identify more closely with nonhuman animals that have human characteristics, and this allows for humans to create a hierarchy that places nonhuman that humans are able to identify more closely with at the top, and those it shares less characteristics with at the bottom. Humans have evolved to sympathize with beings similar to themselves. This allows humans to justify the killing of certain animals over others, because due to the hierarchy humans have created, some animals are of lesser value and therefore have fewer rights. For example, Western cultures kill cows, chickens, and fish for consumption, but find it morally wrong to kill lions, dogs, and dolphins. That is because Western moral values find connections between humans and lions, dogs, and dolphins, but do not find connections between cows, chickens, and fish, and therefore value certain species' lives over others. Which species are valued over others differs depending on culture, country, religion, etc., as can be seen in the fact that it is socially acceptable to eat dogs in many Asian cultures, but is seen as morally corrupt in most Western cultures. The lack of a universal hierarchy for nonhuman animals shows that it is a social construction created to benefit humans.

Vegetarian ecofeminism argues that the killing of any animal is part of a larger system of oppression, and that instead of choosing one animal over another, or a human over a nonhuman animal, humans should care about all oppressed subjects and should be invested in ending each subject's oppression, so as to end the oppression of all beings. The creation of hierarchies in nonhuman animals can also rapidly become the creation of hierarchies in humans, and thus one can once again observe how speciesism is linked to racism, classism, sexism, and other forms of oppression.

Vegetarian ecofeminism asserts that as long as "humans are violent toward animals, they often are violent toward one another" and this "vicious circle of violence and destruction can end only if and when the human species learns to form harmonious relations – non-hierarchical and non-exploitative – with other animal species and the natural world."

== Vegetarianism ==
Vegetarian ecofeminism argues that the oppression of nonhuman animals and the oppression of women are closely linked, so vegetarian ecofeminism argues that eating meat makes one complicit in the exploitation of animals. It also makes one complicit in the violence towards animals and women, for "meat-eating is a form of patriarchal domination [...] that suggests a link between male violence and a meat-based diet". The phrase "the personal is political" is deeply embedded in ecofeminism, because just as it is hypocritical for feminists to buy products created in sweatshops, it is hypocritical for feminists to buy products produced by factory farming. Feminists recognize that buying and consuming these products, whether they are clothes made by a woman denied her human rights in Cambodia or meat from a cow whose rights as a nonhuman animal were violated until it was killed, is an act of support to sweatshops and factory farming, but also to the larger patriarchal system at play.

It is also noted that vegetarianism can be a means to protest violence of all kinds because it believes that "animals and humans suffer and die alike. Violence causes the same pain, the same spilling of blood, the same stench of death, the same arrogant, cruel and brutal taking of life." Vegetarianism is therefore a way that ecofeminists can embody their beliefs, because eating meat directly supports the domination of humans over nonhumans, speciesism, and the creation of hierarchies. Or in other words, "the fact that our meat-advocating culture has successfully separated the consequence of eating animals from the experience of eating animals". The dairy industry acquires revenue via artificial insemination and the consequential lactating of female bodies. When their calf is born, the newborn is immediately taken from their mother. If they are a male calf, they are destined to be sold to the veal or beef industry. If they are a female calf, they are destined to live the same dairy cow life as their mothers. Vegetarians are able to empathize with nonhuman animals and reject the notion of speciesism, and their diets reflect their beliefs. Vegetarian ecofeminists do the same but connect it to the larger picture of systematic oppression, and recognize that the only way that humans are able to justify their oppression of animals is to discredit the empathy and sympathy felt for nonhuman animals.

== Link between sexism and speciesism ==
While the goal of vegetarian ecofeminism is to end all oppression, it does focus on the connections between the oppression of nonhuman animals and the oppression of women. Both are objectified by men within the dominant discourse of the patriarchy, though in different ways: women are seen as sex objects and nonhuman animals are seen as food. In both instances, both beings are considered to be less than men, and therefore are able to be used, abused, and consumed by those with more privilege. There are often essentialistic and empathetic connections made between human mothers and nonhuman mothers, and ecofeminist scholar Carol Adams exemplifies this when she states "As a lactating mother, I empathize with the sow whose reproductive freedoms have been denied and whose nursing experience seems so wretched." Generalizing women as mothers is problematic because not all women identify as mothers, yet there often is a strong link made between women and nonhuman animals due to their shared experience and oppression as mothers.

The egg, veal, and dairy industry directly profits from exploiting the reproductive system of female nonhuman animals. Similarly, many industries, like the advertising industry, profit from objectifying female human bodies, treating them as something to be dominated. Adams asserts that the culturally accepted belief that animal bodies are "disposable objects for fun or eating" emboldens the acceptance of "heterosexuality as normative and the idea that pleasuring men is women's work".

=== Linking sexism and speciesism through language ===
Women are often objectified by being compared to a piece of meat or dehumanized by being called a 'cow' or a 'bird'. There is indeed a history of dehumanization through equating humans to animals, which because of speciesism, means that they are devalued and considered to be less than other valued humans. This is often seen in cases of genocide, in Rwanda the Tutsi were compared to cockroaches for many months prior to the genocide. Viewing humans as animals makes it easier to oppress them, and thus it is once again clear that in order to end the oppression of humans, one must also work to end the oppression of nonhuman animals, because so long as nonhuman animals are viewed as inherently inferior to humans, dehumanization will continue to be justified with comparisons to nonhuman animals.

== Morality and ethics ==
Sympathy towards nonhuman animals and recognizing that the same dominant power is abusing all of the oppressed is essential to ending all oppression because "humans have an innate sense of sympathy and that this is the basis for moral awareness", and are therefore able to make the moral and sympathetic connections between human experiences and nonhuman experiences. These can include the connection mothers will feel to cows being exploited for their milk, or the understanding among "people of color, women, gays, and lesbians [who] all know the experience of being hunted-of being 'prey' in Western culture." Vegetarian ecofeminists argue that as feminists, those who recognize the domination of the patriarchal power, should also recognize the way in which it dominates and objectifies nonhuman animals, and should therefore feel a moral obligation to end not only women's oppression, but animals' oppression as well.

=== Need for justification when harming nonhuman animals ===
Harming animals goes against humans' natural instincts, and language is used to hide the harm humans cause nonhuman animals. In farming, the act of killing a nonhuman animal is not known as "slaughter" but as "termination" or "meat-packing" and the animals themselves are referred to as "livestock". This terminology prevents sympathy, through disconnecting the living animal from the product, and by masking the harm done to these nonhuman animals by humans. Another justification for exploiting and harming animals is that it is a necessary function in order for humans to survive. This is supported by the discourse that humans must consume meat and eggs in order to be healthy, or that animal testing must be used to advance medicine. So while humans are naturally empathetic and caring to nonhuman animals, there are a great deal of obstacles created by "the substantial power of institutionalized animal exploitation [that] sustain ignorance, promote fear, reward cruelty, and punish kindness." These obstacles are deeply ingrained in many societies and thus social justice for nonhuman animals is often difficult to obtain.

== The feminist–vegetarian connection ==
The feminist–vegetarian connection first appeared in Sheri Lucas' "A Defense of the Feminist-Vegetarian Connection", a response to Kathryn Paxton George's book Animal, Vegetable, or Woman? A Feminist Critique of Ethical Vegetarianism (2000). The feminist–vegetarian connection is a concept indicating that the oppression of animals in the form of being slaughtered and consumed is parallel to the oppression of women in a patriarchal society, which establishes a connection between feminism and vegetarianism. Carol J. Adams first published on this topic in 1975. However, this topic was mentioned in 'few publications' for ten years afterwards. The lack of acknowledgment on this topic in the 1980s became a concern amongst feminists and, eventually, triggered the formation of an 'Ecofeminist Task Force' in 1990, raising awareness on the feminist–vegetarian connection. After 1990, this connection was extensively analysed in articles and journals by numerous scholars such as Josephine Donovan and Kathryn Paxton George.

== Criticism ==
Kathryn Paxton George argues against the connection between vegetarianism and feminism, stating that vegetarian diets place "arbitrary burdens upon females that males do not have to bear." George bases this claim on the belief that men to be more likely to succeed on a vegetarian diet than women, stating the potential health risks brought by a vegetarian or vegan diet are "rare for Western adult males, for whom the ideal is best suited". For example, she has cited pregnancy as a source of nutritional stress that poses a risk of harm to the fetus. She has also described socioeconomic disadvantages of women as a barrier to vegetarianism, especially in concern to the use of iron and B12 supplements. Additionally, George has cast doubt on the validity of research on plant-based nutrition, claiming that it was "done almost entirely on men."

== Voices in support of the feminist–vegetarian connection ==
=== Food choices and gender identification ===
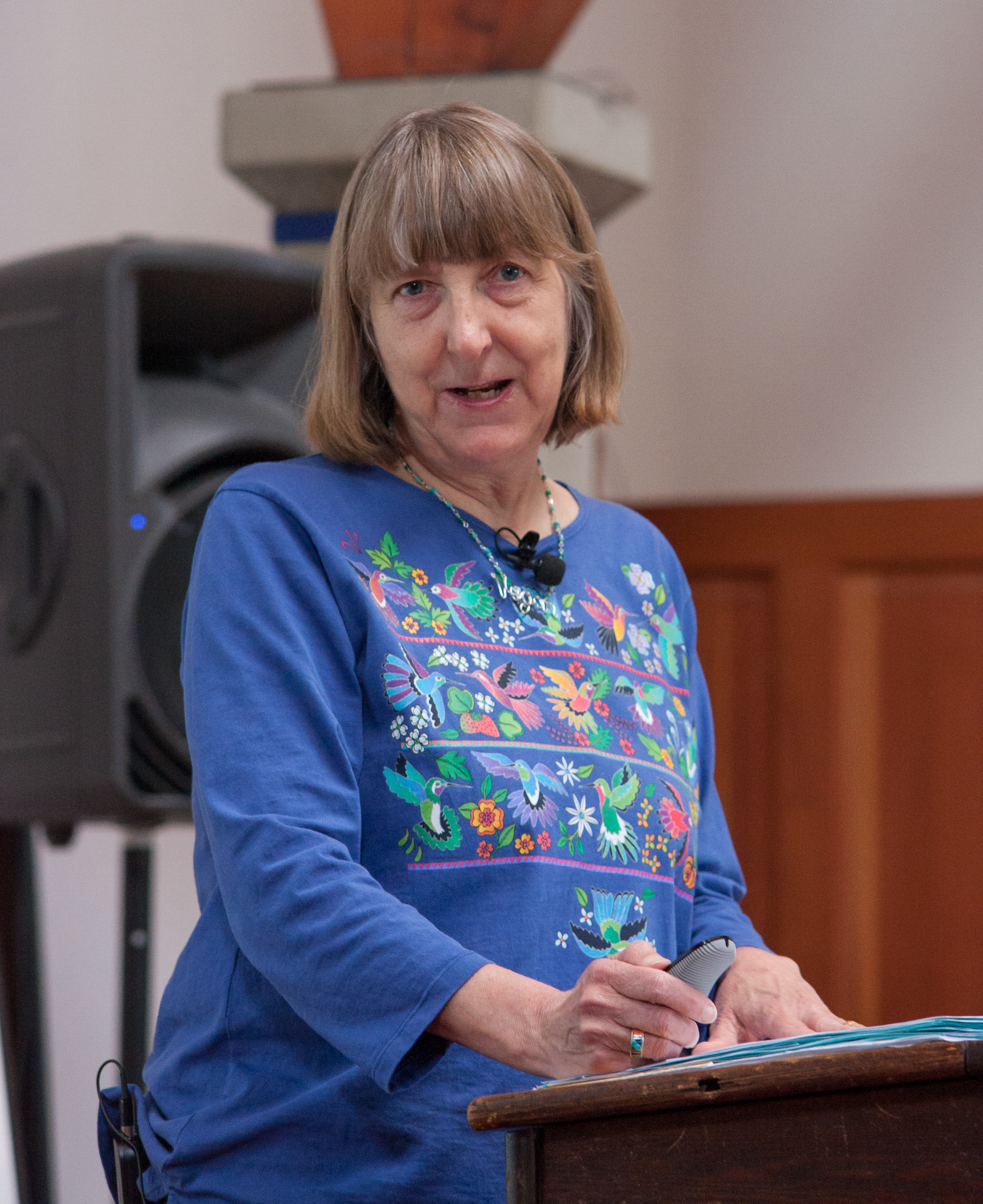
Carol J. Adams speaks at the Intersectional Justice Conference at the Whidbey Institute. 2016

Some scholars such as Carol J. Adams and Josephine Donovan support the feminist–vegetarian connection. In The Sexual Politics of Meat: A Feminist-Vegetarian Critical Theory, Adams establishes "the cross-mapping between feminism and vegetarianism" through an in-depth analysis of gender identification embedded in people's food choices. In a patriarchal society, "meat is constant for men, intermittent for women". For example, "'Ethiopian women and girls of all classes are obliged to prepare two meals, one for the males and a second, often containing no meat or other substantial protein, for the females'". Also, women who prepare to be pregnant are told that "one should eat meat (or fish, vegetables, chocolate, and salt) at least six weeks before becoming pregnant if one wants a boy. But if a girl is desired, no meat please, rather milk, cheese, nuts, beans, and cereals". Additionally, there are cultural food taboos that concern meat consumption based on gender; women are commonly forbidden to have "chicken, duck, and pork" and also "fish, seafood, and eggs" in some Asian countries. Only "vegetables and other nonmeat foods are viewed as women's food". Thus, gender identification is heavily associated with the eating of animals; meat-eating links with masculinity while vegetable-eating suggests "emasculation or femininity". This gender-based reading of meat-eating is further accentuated by "Derrida's notion of carnophallogocentrism," indicating that "masculinity and carnivorism work together to support the virility, power, and authority of one who argues, dialogues, and speaks reasonably".

=== Links between women and animals ===
Adams also argues that animals and women are linked through "fused oppressions" as "we oppress animals by associating them with women's lesser status". Examples include the use of different gender pronouns based on whether an animal poses as having "a major power (he) or a minor power (she)". In this case, a major power refers to "'an active power and a possible danger to the speaker'" while a minor power refers to the power "'as a potential prey, a power that has to be destroyed'". Adams further explains that "'she' represents not only a 'minor power', but a vanished power, a soon-to-be-killed powerless animal". Through Adams' analysis, a female-gendered pronoun becomes an indicator of the oppressed, "representing the violated victim of male violence". Thus, women and animals are linked through "a shared and co-constitutive mechanism of oppression that manifests linguistically, particularly through metaphor".

In addition, Adams indicates that people exploits animals' "femaleness" through the consumption of female animals such as hens and cows as well as their by-products such as eggs and dairy. In the meat industry, slaughters are told not to slaughter female animals "in the advanced stage of pregnancy" because "the physiological condition of the female is disturbed and the flesh is not normal". Conclusively, Adams states that "the text of the body upon whom we write the fate of being meat is symbolically if not predominantly female".

Furthermore, Adams argues that the links between women and animals are reinforced "through a structure of the absent referent". For instance, animals whose flesh is called "meat" become "absent referent" through butchering; by renaming dead bodies as meat, people "do not conjured dead, butchered animals, but cuisine". On the other hand, Women also becomes absent in the language about sexual violence. For example, the term "rape" is used metaphorically to depict other devastating violent incidents, such as "'rape' of the earth in ecological writing of the early 1970s'". In this case, the experiences of women are recalled "as a vehicle for explicating another being's oppression" yet women themselves are absent. According to Adams, violence against both women and animals in the form of "sexual violence and meat eating ... find a point of intersection in the absent referent; ... if animals are the absent referent in the phrase 'the butchering of women', women are the absent referent in the phrase 'the rape of animals'".

Vegetarian ecofeminism brings to light the interconnecting oppressions of women and animals within the patriarchal hierarchy. One primary issue that feminists address is autonomy over their bodies, independent and free from control from the church and the state. Vegan ecofeminist Marti Kheel contends that "the lack of control that women have over their reproductive capacity in patriarchal society is magnified on factory farms where female cows are kept in a continual state of lactation, and where rape racks are routinely used to impregnate female animals".

=== Alliance between feminism and vegetarianism ===
After acknowledging the connections amongst vegetable-eating, women, and animals, Adams proposes that "not only was vegetarianism a logical enacting of a moral viewpoint, but it also resonated with feminist theory and female experience". According to ethicist Beverly Harrison, feminists must be with their bodies and acknowledge that all their knowledge, including their moral one, is 'body-mediated knowledge'; disconnecting from their bodies would result in the destruction of 'possibility of moral relations' amongst feminists. Adams further asserts that "ethical vegetarianism is a theory people enact with their bodies" as "vegetarians identify a connection between a healthy body and a diet that honors the moral relations between us and other animals". From a biological point of view, Adams supports the arguments that humans have bodies of herbivores as opposed to those of carnivores due to the biological evidences from humans' "teeth, saliva, stomach acids, and length of the intestines". Thus, vegetarianism and feminism are connected through the predominant involvement of one's body. Veganism is a method of rejection to partaking in the oppression of animals in a patriarchal culture.

=== Other voices and evidences supporting the feminist–vegetarian connection ===
Through evidences from several nutritional studies that prove the health benefits of vegetarian and vegan diets, Donovan explicitly proclaims that "yes, feminists should be vegetarians" one year after the publication of George's article "Should Feminists be Vegetarians?" in 1994. Donovan quotes "Nutritional Consequences of Vegetarianism" that "'with appropriate attention to nutritional needs, the health consequences of vegetarianism itself are neutral and in some respects may even be positive'". Based on nutritional studies done in 1994, she also quotes that "infant, children, adolescents, and pregnant women have ... special needs ... vegan diets can safely be used by these groups if foods, and in some instances, supplements, are selected which provide a healthful and nutritionally adequate diet ... In many cases, vegan diets offer health benefits". Donovan also claims that "most non-Western diets are largely vegetarian" and meat-eating, as a 'Western norm', is imposed on non-Western countries through 'Western cultural imperialism'. Moreover, according to Lucas, "in the West, nearly all of the available flesh, milk products, and eggs are the output of cruel, violent, and wasteful practices". By extension, purchasing and consuming any animal products directly supports cruelty. Such evidences disproving the potential biological and environmental harm caused by vegetarianism accentuates the necessity of adopting a vegetarian or vegan diet while being a feminist. According to Donovan, "feminism must take a stand against animal suffering and exploitation, including human consumption of meat".

== Praxis ==
=== Activism ===
While vegetarian ecofeminism is at its core an academic field, its main principles and ideas – eradicating all oppression by including speciesism and emphasizing the link between speciesism and sexism – can be transferred from theory into action through activism. Activism can take many forms, one of the most common and achievable being the power of boycotting products that support the exploitation and abuse of women and/or animals. For example, vegetarian ecofeminists might boycott products that were created in sweatshops and therefore exploited women, or products that were tested on animals or that were created by killing animals and therefore exploited nonhuman animals. The act of being a vegetarian or a vegan is itself a form of boycotting, for it choosing not to consume products that were created at the expense of killing or abusing nonhuman animals. Even at the Ecofeminist Task Force of the National Women's Studies Association suggested that no animal products should be served the 1990 NWSA meeting or at future conferences due to ecological and humane issues. Vegetarian ecofeminist might put their beliefs into practice by participating in demonstrations, as was seen at the 1990 March for the Animals in Washington, D.C., when ecofeminists carried a banner showing their support of recognizing how the domination of humans over nonhumans animals fits into ecofeminism, but also feminism in general.

== Key thinkers ==
Since vegetarian ecofeminism is part of the larger academic field of ecofeminism, the most significant thinkers of vegetarian ecofeminism are part of both, but one of their focuses is connecting the domination of women to the domination of nonhuman animals, and understanding how animal liberation fits into ecofeminism.

Greta Gaard is one of the main thinkers within ecofeminism in general, but especially within vegetarian ecofeminism. Aside from being an activist and a writer, she is also a professor at the University of Wisconsin, River Falls. Her essay entitled "Vegetarian Ecofeminism" speaks to many of the key concepts within the field, including the importance of including speciesism in ecofeminism.

Carol J. Adams, both a vegetarian ecofeminist writer and activist, has spent over twenty years writing about ecofeminism, focusing on the importance of connecting speciesism to sexism. Her article entitled "Ecofeminism and the Eating of Animals" is an essential work to the field, and draws upon the importance of not consuming meat as an ecofeminist. Another one of her major works is The Sexual Politics of Meat, which once again examines major themes in vegetarian ecofeminism.

== See also ==
- Women and vegetarianism and veganism advocacy
- Black veganism
- Vegan studies
