= Mark Mathew Braunstein =

American writer

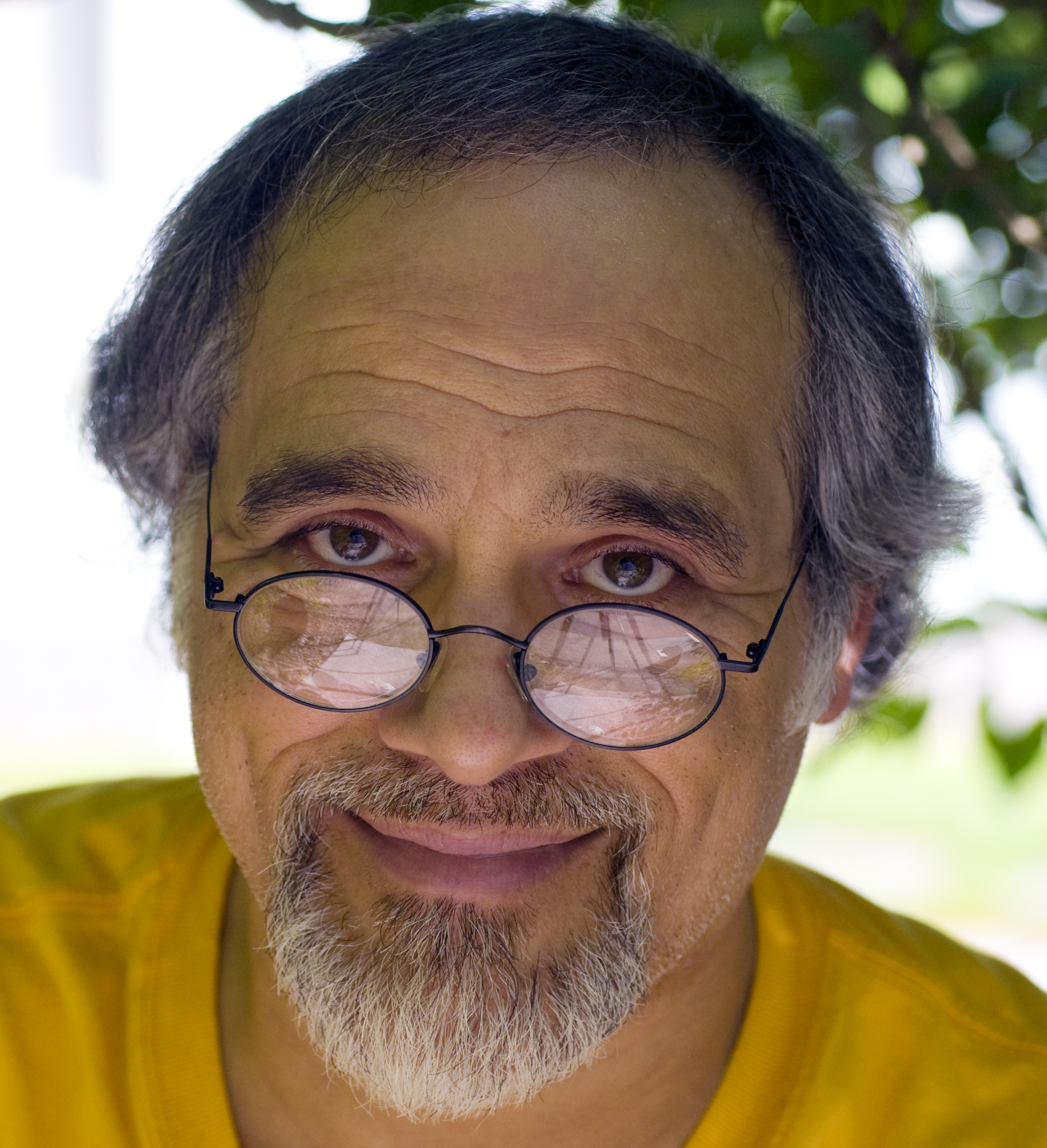
- Braunstein in 2010
- Born: August 6, 1951 (age 75); New York City
- Occupation: Writer

Mark Mathew Braunstein (born August 6, 1951) is an American writer, nature photographer, art librarian, and advocate of medical marijuana legalization. His writing focuses on the topics of vegetarianism/veganism, wildlife conservation, animal rights, sprouting, and raw food. Braunstein has written six books, including his sixth, Mindful Marijuana Smoking: Health Tips for Cannabis Smokers, and his first, Radical Vegetarianism: A Dialectic of Diet and Ethic, and many magazine articles.

== Life ==
Braunstein was born in New York City. His parents were Benjamin and Clare Braunstein. Benjamin Braunstein (died 2005) was a book critic and a literature and journalism teacher at Bayside High School, Queens, New York City. Clare Braunstein (January 20, 1926 - April 5, 2011) was a homemaker and an editor of the Hadassah newsletter, and of its cookbook entitled One People, One Heart: Culinary Classics. Mark Braunstein has a brother, Jack A. Braunstein of Gibson, Pennsylvania.

In 1969, Mark Braunstein graduated from Farmingdale High School (Farmingdale, New York) In 1974 he received his B.A. degree from the State University of New York at Binghamton. In 1978 he received a Master of Science degree at Pratt Institute, Brooklyn.

From 1978 to 1980, Braunstein was Editor at Rosenthal Arts Slides, Chicago. From 1980 to 1983 he was Assistant editor at Art Index in New York City. From 1983 to 1987 he was Head of slides and photographs at Rhode Island School of Design in Providence. Since 1987, he has been an art curator and art librarian at Connecticut College, New London, Connecticut.

Braunstein has been a vegetarian since 1966 and a vegan since 1970.

In 1981, Braunstein published his book, Radical Vegetarianism: A Dialectic of Diet and Ethic.

An "About the Author" blurb in 1990 said this:

Mark M. Braunstein is the author of Radical Vegetarianism: A Dialectic of Diet & Ethic. In addition to editing reference books on art history, he writes about animal rights and wildlife for journals such as Animals' Agenda, Between the Species, Vegetarian Times, Backpacker and East West. He lives in a wildlife refuge in Quaker Hill, CT, where his favourite hobby is sabotaging hunting. He served as the guest editor for this issue of the Trumpeter.

On August 6, 1990 (his 39th birthday), Braunstein became a paraplegic due to a spinal cord injury from a diving accident. Since then, he smokes marijuana to control the pain and spasms in his feet and has been an advocate of medical marijuana legalization. He testified before committees of the Connecticut legislature seven times over 14 years, urging passage of bills to legalize medical marijuana.

Braunstein, after discovering that some prostitutes were meeting with clients on his private road, began documenting their lives. From his photographs of them and their life stories collected over a ten-year period, he created a literary and photography project entitled "Good Girls on Bad Drugs", which explores the lives of streetwalkers in the New London, Connecticut, area. In October 2017, Braunstein published a book entitled Good Girls on Bad Drugs: Addiction Nonfiction of the Unhappy Hookers.

His sixth and most recent book, Mindful Marijuana Smoking: Health Tips for Cannabis Smokers, was published in 2022.

Braunstein is single and lives in Quaker Hill, Connecticut.

== Books ==
- Braunstein, Mark Mathew (2009-03-01) [1981]. Radical Vegetarianism: A Dialectic of Diet and Ethic. Lantern Books. ISBN 978-1590561515. LCCN 2009024467. Foreword by Viktoras Kulvinskas.
  - Paul Barret Obis; Ted PanDeva Zagar; Scott S. Smith (February 1982). "Radical Vegetarianism: A Dialectic of Diet and Ethic" (PDF). Vegetarian Times (Review). No. 54.
- Cashman, Norine D.; Braunstein, Mark M., eds. (August 1990). Slide Buyers' Guide: International Directory of Slide Sources for Art and Architecture (6th ed.). Libraries Unlimited, Inc. ISBN 978-0872877979.
- Braunstein, Mark Mathew (March 1999) [1993]. Sprout Garden: Indoor Grower's Guide to Gourmet Sprouts. Summertown, Tennessee: Book Publishing Company. ISBN 978-1570670732. LCCN 99014286.
- Braunstein, Mark Mathew (2012-10-17). Germinados: Guía para cultivarlos en casa [Sprout Garden: Indoor Grower's Guide to Gourmet Sprouts] (in Spanish). Translated by Rodriguez-Vida, Susana. Barcelona: Ediciones del Serbal, S.A. ISBN 9788476287163.
- Braunstein, Mark Mathew (2013-07-05). Microgreen Garden: Indoor Grower's Guide to Gourmet Greens. Summertown, Tennessee: Book Publishing Company. ISBN 978-1570672941. LCCN 2013002999.
  - Gail Lord (November 19, 2013). "Microgreen Garden: Indoor Grower's Guide to Gourmet Greens". Spirit of Change Retrieved 2024-04-14. (Review). Winter 2013.
- Braunstein, Mark Mathew (2019-03-04) [2017]. Good Girls On Bad Drugs: Addiction Nonfiction in a Revised Edition (2nd ed.). Quaker Hill, Connecticut: Panacea Press. ISBN 978-0963566355. LCCN 2018954099.
  - Lindsay Boyle (February 9, 2019). "Retired librarian's book details lives of local sex workers". The Day. New London.
  - "Braunstein collects the life stories of several young, female addicts in this nonfiction work". Kirkus Reviews. Retrieved 2024-04-14. (Review). October 2, 2018.
- Braunstein, Mark Mathew (2019-05-22). Final Thoughts: Beginner's Guide to Death. Panacea Press. ISBN 978-0963566362. LCCN 2018966460
- Braunstein, Mark Mathew (2022-07-17). Mindful Marijuana Smoking: Health Tips for Cannabis Smokers. Rowman & Littlefield Publishers. ISBN 978-1538156674. LCCN 2021051061

== Articles ==
- Braunstein, Mark Mathew (March 1980). "On Being Radically Vegetarian". Vegetarian Times: 72–73. "... ours is a sick society where misconception cons the conscience while nature's truths go unheard or unheeded, ..."
- Braunstein, Mark Mathew (September 1980). "Vegetarianism in Art". Vegetarian Times (#40): 20–24. "Isaiah, the vegetarian prophet, meant also that humans must sit with the lamb, the kid, the ox -- because humans must make peace with the animals before they can make peace with other humans."
- Braunstein, Mark Mathew (Summer 1985). "Milk: Utter Truth and Udder Nonsense". Vegetarian Voice. 12 (2). Malaga, New Jersey: North American Vegetarian Society. ISSN 0271-1591. "Along with the majority of the non-Caucasian adult world which cannot digest, and therefore does not drink, milk, you too will outgrow it if you withdraw all milk and milk products for one year."
- Braunstein, Mark Mathew (October 1985). "On Becoming Vegetarian". Between the Species (play). 1 (4): 44, 47. doi:10.15368/bts.1985v1n4.9. "He discovers the worst of conditions awaits the calves for whom the milk is intended. The farm family knows the true cost of milk, the price that must be paid with blood."
- Braunstein, Mark Mathew (1990). "The Beast in the Belly: How Human Food Choices Affect Wild Animals". The Trumpeter. 7 (4). ISSN 0832-6193. "While North Americans forest disappear slowly but steadily, Central and South American rainforests disappear quicker than you can say, 'Cheeseburger.'"
- Braunstein, Mark Mathew (September 1995). "Why and How to Wean from Cow" (PDF). Country Connections: 26. ISSN 1082-0558. "Only humans drink milk past puberty. Along with the majority of the non-Caucasian adult world which cannot digest -- and therefore does not drink -- milk, you, too, will outgrow it if you withdraw all milk and milk products from your diet for one year."
- Braunstein, Mark Mathew (November–December 1995). "Confessions of a Hunt Saboteur: A Real Sab Story". Country Connections. ISSN 1082-0558. "The hunters took aim (upon deer, not upon us) and were just about to release the bowstrings. BOOM! The blasts from our foghorns twice sent deer fleeing to safety."
- Braunstein, Mark Mathew (2004). Karp, Gary; Klein, Stanley D. (eds.). "Take the pain" (PDF). From There to Here: Stories of Adjustment to Spinal Cord Injury. Horsham, Pennsylvania: No Limits Communications: 171–177. "On my thirty-ninth birthday, sober but celebratory, I dived off a footbridge into a river and emerged awaiting a wheelchair. I shattered my T12 vertebra and injured that fragile bundle of nerves called the spinal cord."
- Braunstein, Mark Mathew (2009). "Good Girls on Bad Drugs". Social Documentary Network (Portraits of crack- and heroin-addicted prostitutes). "Once you hear their tragic life stories, you can no longer regard them as criminals or monsters or demons."
- Braunstein, Mark Mathew (2013). "Sunlight and Sustenance" (PDF). Healing Our World. 33 (2). Hippocrates Health Institute: 26, 44, 45. "Exposed to insufficient light, seedlings grow long and frail stems in a vain attempt to reach for more light. Gardeners call this sorry state legginess. Botanists call it etiolation."
- Braunstein, Mark Mathew (2013-04-01). "Eulogy to a Slide Library". Visual Resources Association Bulletin. 39 (3, Article 6). Visual Resources Association. ISSN 1046-9001. "The transition from black-and-white lantern slides to 35mm color slides spanned 30 years—but the transition from 35mm film to digital images occurred virtually overnight. Farewell to the sparkling little gems and jewels called slides." Check the issn.
- Braunstein, Mark Mathew (2015-02-23). "Walking in the March of Time". Spirit of Change (Spring 2015). Uxbridge, Massachusetts. ISSN 1075-9182. "I became an old man in the blink of an eye. At age 39, I experienced instant old age when I dived off a footbridge into a river and did not land right. The impact broke my back, which injured my spinal cord, which paralyzed me below the waist."
- Braunstein, Mark Mathew (Winter 2015). "Meat: The Anti-Longevity Food" (PDF). Healing Our World. 36 (1). Hippocrates Health Institute: 51–52. "Thus we count on a vegan's average life expectancy to be 90 years."
- Braunstein, Mark Mathew (2016-02-23). "First Aid for Cannabis Smokers: 10 ways to reduce the health risks of smoking marijuana". Spirit of Change (Spring 2016). Uxbridge, Massachusetts. ISSN 1075-9182. "[S]moking cannabis leaves much to be desired when compared to breathing fresh air. Not smoking is better than smoking. But if light up you will, then follow some precautions to assure your good health, and you also will lighten up."
- Braunstein, Mark Mathew (July 2016). "Medical Marijuana More Acceptable -- and Refined -- Than Ever". New Mobility. 27 (274). "The War on Drugs is losing, and pot is winning. And people who use medical marijuana have won the right to choose the treatment option in all of Canada, most of Western Europe, and half of the United States."
- Braunstein, Mark Mathew (2017-02-28). "Hungry In New England". Spirit of Change (Spring 2017). Uxbridge, Massachusetts. ISSN 1075-9182. "So next time you're famished and a long way from home, drive up to a Wendy's outlet and order a Baked Potato with Nothing on It, meaning no sour cream and chives, no butter, and no margarine."
- Braunstein, Mark Mathew (2017-09-05). "Distracted Eating". Spirit of Change (Fall 2017). Uxbridge, Massachusetts. ISSN 1075-9182. "Only a fool would intentionally hold his nose while eating, yet we essentially are thumbing our noses at our food when we pay scant attention to what we eat."
- Braunstein, Mark Mathew (February 2018). "Artists and Writers Wanted". New Mobility. 29 (293). "What started in 2008 as a partnership between an artists residency center and a foundation dedicated to improving the quality of life for people with spinal cord injuries has grown into a sprawling, multi-site opportunity unlike any other."
- Braunstein, Mark Mathew (2020-08-25). "When Good Vegans Make Bad Neighbors". Spirit of Change (Fall 2020). Uxbridge, Massachusetts. ISSN 1075-9182. "Was my lack of decorum the thoughtless and reflexive response of a self-righteous animal-rightist? Did my reply stir in him a bitter memory of an incident with some cantankerous vegan more strident than even I?"
- Braunstein, Mark Mathew (2021-02-07). "Medical marijuana in Connecticut has problems; legalizing adult recreational use can fix them". Connecticut Post (op-ed). Bridgeport, Connecticut. "Connecticut has gotten right most parts of its medical marijuana program, but some parts are broken. Legalizing adult recreational use of cannabis can fix what's broken and can prevent from breaking what's fixed."
- Braunstein, Mark Mathew (2022-01-04). "I'm a longtime medical marijuana user—and now I'm a home-grower". Connecticut Magazine (January 2022). "Now that [growing cannabis is] legal for Connecticut's 53,700 patients, a question hangs in the air. How to get started?"
- Braunstein, Mark Mathew (2022-09-01). "Playing With Fire - Safer Ways to Tune up your Cannabis Ignition System". Weed World Magazine. Coventry, England (Issue 159, early Fall 2022). ISSN 1362-3540. Retrieved 2024-04-14. “Countless medical studies have shed light upon the health risks of smoking herbs, be they tobacco or cannabis. Yet most smokers hide behind a smokescreen of denial in recognizing the risky business of inhaling the ignition fumes from lighters or matches.”
- Braunstein, Mark Mathew (2022-11-01). "Waterpipes - The Big Bong Theory". Weed World Magazine. Coventry, England (Issue 160, late Fall 2022). ISSN 1362-3540. Retrieved 2024-04-14. “While the waterpipe had for centuries traditionally been used for tobacco, waterpipes are now associated only with cannabis use.”
- Braunstein, Mark Mathew (2023-01-01). "Eat and Drink to Reduce the Health Risks of Smoking Cannabis". Weed World Magazine. Coventry, England (Issue 161, Winter 2023). ISSN 1362-3540. Retrieved 2024-04-14. “Except for the nicotine in tobacco and the cannabinoids in cannabis, the smoke from the two herbs is quite similar. The nutrient loss from smoking tobacco is well documented, but there is no research about how smoking cannabis, too, might adversely affect your body’s storage and usage of nutrients.”
- Braunstein, Mark Mathew (2023-09-01). "How to Preserve the Potency of Pot". Weed World Magazine. Coventry, England (Issue 165, early Fall 2023). ISSN1362-3540. Retrieved 2024-04-14. “Warmth. Light. Air. Water. The same elements that empower living plants to grow and flourish also reduce the potency of cannabis after it’s been dried and cured.”
- Braunstein, Mark Mathew (2024-12-01). "A Plentitude of Self-Portrait Paintings". Still Point Arts Quarterly. Brunswick, Maine (Number 56, Winter 2024–25). ISSN 2163–0909. Retrieved 2024-12-15. “It is one thing to understand what we see, and another to understand ourselves through what we see.”

== See also ==
- Animal protectionism
- Animal Rights
- Cannabis
- Drugs and prostitution
- Hunt sabotage
- Medical cannabis
- Microgreen
