= Arne Næss =

Norwegian philosopher and mountaineer (1912–2009)

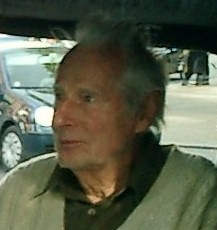
- Arne Næss in 2003
- Born: Arne Dekke Eide Næss; 27 January 1912; Slemdal, Oslo, Norway
- Died: 12 January 2009 (aged 96); Oslo, Norway

Education
- Education: University of Oslo (PhD, 1936)

Philosophical work
- Era: 20th-century philosophy
- Region: Western philosophy
- School: Environmental philosophy
- Institutions: University of Oslo
- Main interests: Environmental philosophy, environmental ethics
- Notable ideas: Deep ecology, ecosophy

Arne Dekke Eide Næss (/ˈɑːrnə ˈnɛs/ AR-nə NESS; Urban East Norwegian: [ˈɑ̂ːɳə ˈdɛ̂kːə ˈæ̂ɪdə ˈnɛsː]; 27 January 1912 – 12 January 2009) was a Norwegian philosopher who coined the term "deep ecology", an important intellectual and inspirational figure within the environmental movement of the late twentieth century, and a prolific writer on many other philosophical issues. Næss cited Rachel Carson's 1962 book Silent Spring as being a key influence in his vision of deep ecology. Næss combined his ecological vision with Gandhian nonviolence and on several occasions participated in direct action.

Næss averred that while western environmental groups of the early post–World War II period had raised public awareness of the environmental issues of the time, they had largely failed to have insight into and address what he argued were the underlying cultural and philosophical background to these problems. Næss believed that the environmental crisis of the twentieth century had arisen due to certain unspoken philosophical presuppositions and attitudes within modern western developed societies which remained unacknowledged.

He thereby distinguished between what he called deep and shallow ecological thinking. In contrast to the prevailing utilitarian pragmatism of western businesses and governments, he advocated that a true understanding of nature would give rise to a point of view that appreciates the value of biological diversity, understanding that each living thing is dependent on the existence of other creatures in the complex web of interrelationships that is the natural world.

== Life and career ==
Næss was born in Slemdal, Oslo, Norway, the son of Christine (Dekke) and Ragnar Eide Næss. Ragnar was a successful banker, and Arne was the younger brother of shipowner Erling Dekke Næss. Næss had two children with his first wife Else and was the uncle of mountaineer and businessman Arne Næss Jr. (1937–2004).

In 1939, Næss was the youngest person to be appointed full professor at the University of Oslo and the only professor of philosophy in the country at the time.

He was a noted mountaineer, who in 1950 led the expedition that made the first ascent of Tirich Mir (7,708 metres or 25,289 feet) in Pakistan, depicted in the documentary film Tirich Mir til topps. The Tvergastein hut in the Hallingskarvet massif played an important role in the name of Næss's philosophy, "Ecosophy T", as "T" is said to represent his mountain hut Tvergastein.

In 1958, he founded the interdisciplinary journal of philosophy Inquiry.

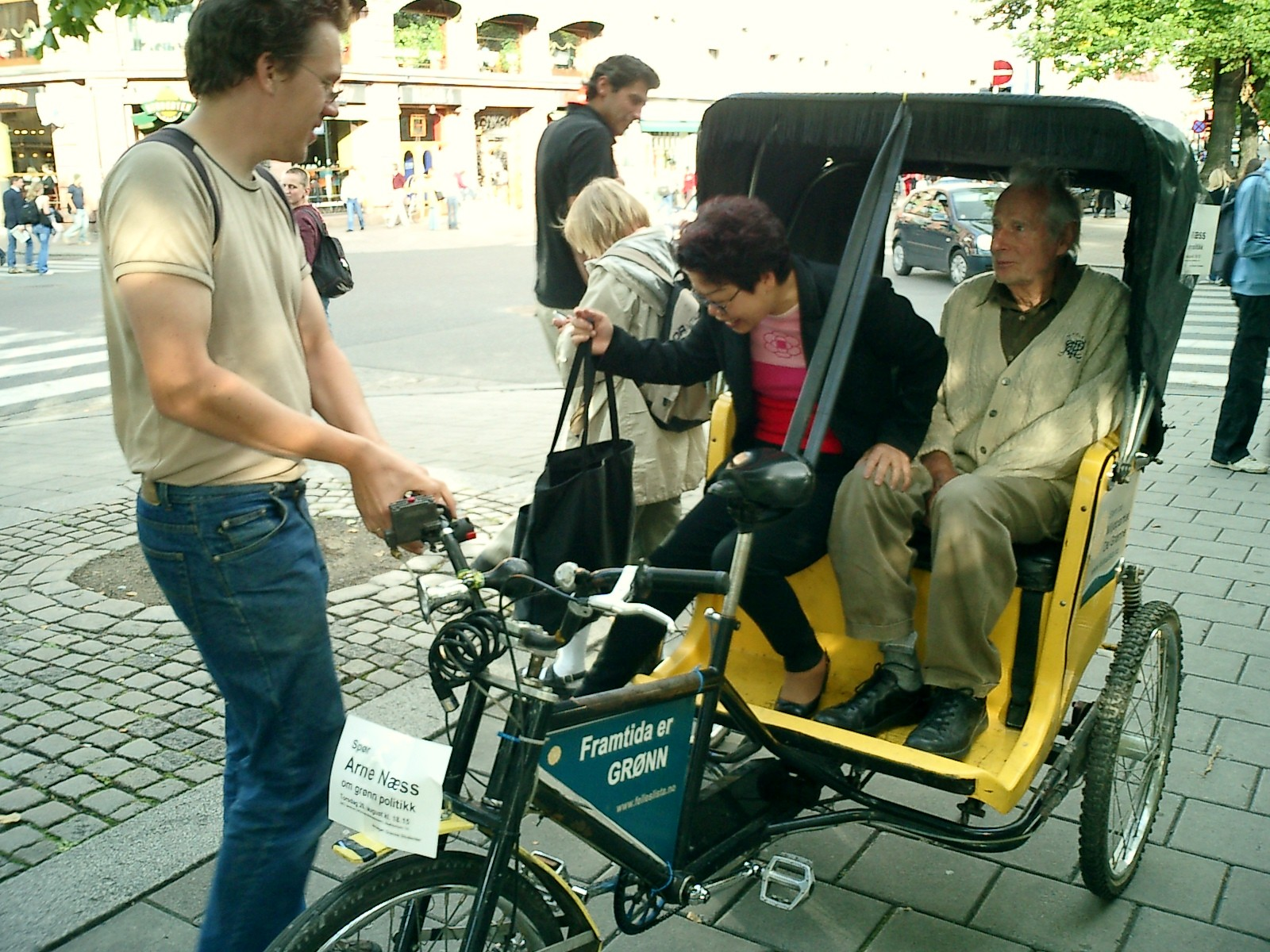
Næss beside Kit-Fai Tsui, campaigning for the Norwegian Green party in 2003

In 1970, together with a large number of protesters, he chained himself to rocks in front of Mardalsfossen, a waterfall in a Norwegian fjord, and refused to descend until plans to build a dam were dropped. Though the demonstrators were carried away by police and the dam was eventually built, the demonstration launched a more activist phase of Norwegian environmentalism.

When he was 61, while guest-lecturing at the University of Hong Kong, he met Kit-Fai Tsui, a philosophy student who was four decades younger than him, whom he married seventeen years later.

In 1996, he won the Swedish Academy Nordic Prize, known as the "little Nobel". In 2005 he was decorated as a Commander with Star of the Royal Norwegian Order of St. Olav for socially useful work. Næss was a minor political candidate for the Norwegian Green Party in 2005. He was inducted into the Norwegian Academy of Science and Letters in 1941.

Næss died on 12 January 2009, at the age of 96.

== Philosophy ==
Næss's book Erkenntnis und wissenschaftliches Verhalten (1936) anticipated many themes familiar in post-war analytic philosophy.

In the 21st century, Næss came to be recognized by newer generations of philosophers as a pioneer of experimental philosophy (a term that Næss himself used) for his empirical semantics research. One of Næss's early publications on experimental philosophy was "Truth" as Conceived by Those Who Are Not Professional Philosophers (1938).

Næss's main philosophical work from the 1950s was entitled Interpretation and Preciseness (1953). This was an application of set theory to the problems of language interpretation, extending the work of semanticists such as Charles Kay Ogden in The Meaning of Meaning. A simple way of explaining it is that any given utterance (word, phrase, or sentence) can be considered as having different potential interpretations, depending on prevailing language norms, the characteristics of particular persons or groups of users, and the language situation in which the utterance occurred. These differing interpretations are to be formulated in more precise language represented as subsets of the original utterance. Each subset can, in its turn, have further subsets (theoretically ad infinitum). The advantages of this conceptualisation of interpretation are various. It enables systematic demonstration of possible interpretation, making possible evaluation of which are the more and less "reasonable interpretations". It is a logical instrument for demonstrating language vagueness, undue generalisation, conflation, pseudo-agreement and effective communication.

Næss developed a simplified, practical textbook embodying these advantages, entitled Communication and Argument: Elements of Applied Semantics (1966), which became a valued introduction to this pragmatics or "language logic", and was used over many decades as a sine qua non for the preparatory examination at the University of Oslo, later known as examen philosophicum ("exphil").

=== Recommendations for public debate ===
Næss's book Communication and Argument (1966) included his recommendations for objective public debate. Næss argued for adhering to the following principles to make discussions as fruitful and pleasant as possible:

1. "Avoid tendentious references to side issues"—distractions such as personal attacks, claims about opponents' motivation, or irrelevant explanations or arguments.
2. "Avoid tendentious renderings of other people's views"—editing quotes or paraphrasing in a biased or misleading way (for example, quoting out of context).
3. "Avoid tendentious ambiguity"—deliberately offering ambiguous statements instead of more precise ones (equivocation).
4. "Avoid tendentious argument from alleged implication"—assigning views to opponents that they do not hold (straw men).
5. "Avoid tendentious firsthand reports"—information that is untrue or incomplete, withholding relevant information (for example, lying by omission).
6. "Avoid tendentious use of contexts"—presenting material with extra accessories of persuasion and suggestion such as visual or aural appeals to emotion of irony, sarcasm, insult, exaggeration, or subtle (or open) threat.

For many years these points were part of a compulsory course in philosophy (examen philosophicum) taught in Norwegian universities.

Argumentation theorist Erik Krabbe later said that Næss's principles for effective discussion were precursors of the rules for critical discussion in pragma-dialectics.

=== Ecosophy T ===
Ecosophy T, as distinct from deep ecology, was originally the name of Næss's personal philosophy. Others such as Warwick Fox have interpreted deep ecology as a commitment to ecosophy T, Næss's personal beliefs. The "T" referred to Tvergastein, a mountain hut where he wrote many of his books, and reflected Næss's view that everyone should develop his own philosophy.

Næss's ecosophy can be summed up as self-realization. According to Næss, every being, whether human, animal or vegetable, has an equal right to live and to blossom. Næss states that through self-realization humans can become part of the ecosystems of Earth, in distinction to becoming only themselves. According to one writer, Næss defined the ethical consequences of self-realization as: If one does not know how the outcomes of one's actions will affect other beings, one should not act.

In an article that summarized Næss's career, Nina Witoszek noted that he qualified his most radical propositions using the rhetorical term "in principle", and he pragmatically recognized that, in Witoszek's words, "concessions are unavoidable; dogmas are ductile; and practice diverges from principle".

== Selected works ==
- Næss, Arne (1936). Erkenntnis und wissenschaftliches Verhalten. Skrifter utg. av det Norske videnskaps-akademi i Oslo. 2. Hist.-filos. klasse, 1936 (in German). Vol. 1. Oslo: I kommisjom hos J. Dybwad. OCLC 5916296.
- Næss, Arne (1938). "Truth" as Conceived by Those Who Are Not Professional Philosophers. Skrifter utg. av det Norske videnskaps-akademi i Oslo, II. Hist.-filos. klasse, 1938, no. 4. Oslo: I. kommisjon hos J. Dybwad. OCLC 1021167.
- Næss, Arne (1953). Interpretation and Preciseness: A Contribution to the Theory of Communication. Skrifter utg. av det Norske videnskaps-akademi i Oslo. 2. Hist.-filos. klasse, 1953, no. 1. Oslo: I kommisjon hos J. Dybwad. OCLC 3195596.
- Næss, Arne; Christophersen, Jens A.; Kvalø, Kjell (1956). Democracy, Ideology, and Objectivity: Studies in the Semantics and Cognitive Analysis of Ideological Controversy. Oslo: Published for the Norwegian Research Council for Science and the Humanities by University Press. OCLC 1942421.
- Næss, Arne (June 1958). "A systematization of Gandhian ethics of conflict resolution". Journal of Conflict Resolution. 2 (2): 140–155. doi:10.1177/002200275800200202. JSTOR 172972. S2CID 144823357.
- Næss, Arne (1965). Gandhi and the Nuclear Age. Totowa, NJ: Bedminster Press. OCLC 368861.
- Næss, Arne (1966). Communication and Argument: Elements of Applied Semantics. Translated by Alastair Hannay. Totowa, NJ: Bedminster Press. OCLC 1012411.
- Næss, Arne (1968) [1965]. Four Modern Philosophers: Carnap, Wittgenstein, Heidegger, Sartre. Translated by Alastair Hannay. Chicago: University of Chicago Press. OCLC 252616. Translation of Moderne filosofer.
- Næss, Arne (1968). Scepticism. International Library of Philosophy and Scientific Method. New York: Humanities Press. ISBN 9780710036391. OCLC 1283.
- Næss, Arne (1973). "The shallow and the deep, long-range ecology movement: a summary" (PDF). Inquiry: An Interdisciplinary Journal of Philosophy. 16 (1–4): 95–100. doi:10.1080/00201747308601682. S2CID 52207763.
- Næss, Arne (1975) [1972]. Freedom, Emotion and Self-Subsistence: The Structure of a Central Part of Spinoza's Ethics. Filosofiske problemer. Vol. 42. Oslo: Universitetsforl. ISBN 8200014592. OCLC 3841538.
- Næss, Arne (Fall 1984). "A defence of the deep ecology movement". Environmental Ethics. 6 (3): 265–270. Bibcode:1984EnEth...6..265N. doi:10.5840/enviroethics19846330.
- Næss, Arne (Winter 1986). "The deep ecological movement: some philosophical aspects". Philosophical Inquiry. 8 (1/2): 10–31. doi:10.5840/philinquiry198681/22.
- Naess, Arne (1987). "Self-realization: an ecological approach to being in the world". The Trumpeter. 4 (3): 35–42.
- Næss, Arne (1989) [1976]. Ecology, Community and Lifestyle: Outline of an Ecosophy. Translated by David Rothenberg. Cambridge, UK; New York: Cambridge University Press. doi:10.1017/CBO9780511525599. ISBN 0521344069. OCLC 17621528. "Not a direct translation of Arne Naess' 1976 work, Økologi, samfunn, og livsstil, but rather a new work in English, based on the Norwegian, with many sections revised and rewritten by Professor Naess".
- Rothenberg, David; Næss, Arne (1993). Is It Painful to Think?: Conversations with Arne Næss. Minneapolis: University of Minnesota Press. ISBN 0816621519. JSTOR 10.5749/j.ctttspr2. OCLC 25631774.
- Witoszek, Nina; Brennan, Andrew, eds. (1999). Philosophical Dialogues: Arne Næss and the Progress of Ecophilosophy. Lanham, MD: Rowman & Littlefield. ISBN 084768928X. OCLC 39157669.
- Næss, Arne; Haukeland, Per Ingvar (2002) [1998]. Life's Philosophy: Reason & Feeling in a Deeper World. Translated by Roland Huntford. Athens, GA: University of Georgia Press. ISBN 0820324183. JSTOR j.ctt46n9qm. OCLC 48642579.
- Glasser, Harold, ed. (2005). The Selected Works of Arne Naess, Volumes 1–10. Springer-Verlag. doi:10.1007/978-1-4020-4519-6. ISBN 9781402037276. OCLC 62309695. (Review by David Orton, 2006)
  - Vol. 1: Interpretation and Preciseness: A Contribution to the Theory of Communication
  - Vol. 2: Scepticism: Wonder and Joy of a Wandering Seeker
  - Vol. 3: Which World Is the Real One?: Inquiry into Comprehensive Systems, Cultures, and Philosophies
  - Vol. 4: The Pluralist and Possibilist Aspect of the Scientific Enterprise: Rich Descriptions, Abundant Choices, and Open Futures
  - Vol. 5: Gandhi and Group Conflict: Explorations of Nonviolent Resistance, Satyāgraha
  - Vol. 6: Freedom, Emotion, and Self-Subsistence: The Structure of a Central Part of Spinoza's Ethics
  - Vol. 7: Communication and Argument: Elements of Applied Semantics
  - Vol. 8: Common Sense, Knowledge, and Truth: Open Inquiry in a Pluralistic World: Selected Papers
  - Vol. 9: Reason, Democracy, and Science: Understanding Among Conflicting Worldviews: Selected Papers
  - Vol. 10: Deep Ecology of Wisdom: Explorations in Unities of Nature and Cultures: Selected Papers
- Drengson, Alan R.; Devall, Bill, eds. (2008). Ecology of Wisdom: Writings by Arne Naess. Berkeley, CA: Counterpoint. ISBN 9781582434018. OCLC 180574094.
