= Pattrice jones =

American writer, educator, and activist

pattrice jones
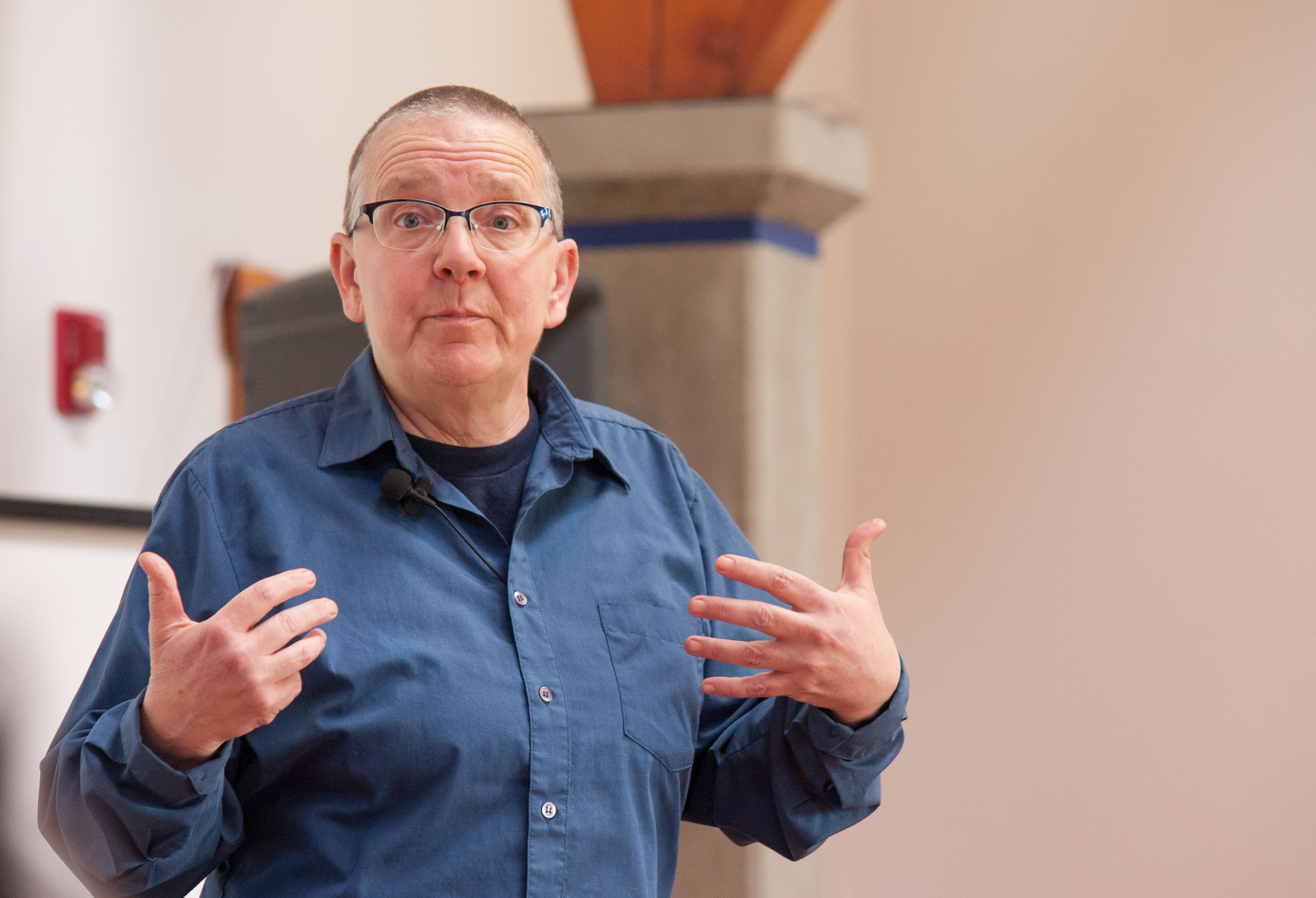
- jones speaking at the Intersectional Justice Conference at the Whidbey Institute
- Born: 1961 (age 64–65); Baltimore, Maryland
- Education: Towson University; University of Michigan
- Organization: VINE Sanctuary
- Known for: Ecofeminism; Animal rights Veganism
- Website: pattricejones.info

pattrice jones is an American ecofeminist writer, educator, and activist. She is the co-founder of VINE Sanctuary in Springfield, Vermont, an LGBTQ-run farmed-animal sanctuary.

== Activism ==
Jones has been involved in social justice activism since the 1970s. At 15, she came out as a lesbian and stopped eating meat, later adopting veganism out of concern for the sexual exploitation of female farmed animals. Her commitment to animal rights is closely linked to her feminist principles, emphasizing the intersections of gender, sexuality, and the ethical treatment of animals.

In the year 2000, jones and her partner Miriam Jones founded Eastern Shore Sanctuary in rural Maryland. The sanctuary was relocated to Vermont in 2009, and later renamed to VINE ("Veganism Is the Next Evolution") Sanctuary.

Around 2002–2003, jones was recognized as the main organizer of the Global Hunger Alliance (GHA), an international network of several activist organizations that was coordinated in preparation for the 2002 World Food Summit. The GHA networked with 90 other "supportive" organizations from around the world, including People for the Ethical Treatment of Animals, Physicians Committee for Responsible Medicine and Uncaged Campaigns.

In 2012, jones became involved in a battle over the lives of Bill and Lou, two oxen at Green Mountain College in Poultney, Vermont. After one of the oxen, Lou, became injured, the school decided to slaughter both and serve them as food in the dining hall. Students and animal rights advocates protested, and jones offered the oxen a home at VINE Sanctuary. The college ultimately euthanized Lou. The controversy made national headlines. jones wrote about the events in her book, The Oxen at the Intersection.

== Awards ==
Jones has been recognized for her activism and scholarship, receiving multiple commendations for her work in ecofeminism and animal rights. In 2013, she was invited to speak at the International Animal Rights Conference, where she presented on intersectionality and rights-based approaches. In 2018, she was honored with the Lisa Shapiro Young Animal Activist Award, presented to her by Animal Outlook's Erica Meier.

== Writing and Lectures ==
Jones writes and lectures about animal rights from an intersectional approach, connecting speciesism with racism, sexism, homophobia, and transphobia. In her writing and lectures, she touches on the theory and praxis of social change activism, as well as the fields of psychology, gender studies, and LGBTQ studies. Her writing and lectures aim to educate on the interconnectedness of various forms of oppression and the importance of an inclusive, compassionate approach to activism. She is the author of Aftershock: Confronting Trauma in a Violent World: A Guide for Activists and Their Allies (Lantern, 2007), The Oxen at the Intersection: A Collision (Lantern, 2014), and has contributed chapters to Ecofeminism: Feminist Intersections with Other Animals and the Earth (Bloomsbury, 2014); Confronting Animal Exploitation: Grassroots Essays on Liberation and Veganism (McFarland, 2013); Sister Species: Women, Animals and Social Justice (University of Illinois Press, 2011); Sistah Vegan: Food, Identity, Health, and Society (Lantern, 2010); Contemporary Anarchist Studies (Routledge, 2009); Igniting a Revolution: Voices in Defense of the Earth (AK Press, 2006); and Terrorists or Freedom Fighters?: Reflections on the Liberation of Animals (Lantern, 2004).

== See also ==
- Speciesism
- List of animal rights advocates

== Selected publications ==
- pattrice le-muire jones (2001). "The Hunger for a Solution". The Animals' Agenda. 21 (5): 36–37.
- Best, Steven (June 1, 2004). "Mothers with Monkeywrenches: Feminist Imperatives and the ALF". Terrorists or Freedom Fighters?: Reflections on the Liberation of Animals. Lantern Books. pp. 137–156. ISBN 978-1590560549.
- jones, pattrice (June 2005). "Of Brides and Bridges: Linking Feminist, Queer, and Animal Liberation Movements". Satya.
- Steven Best; Anthony J. Nocella II (April 1, 2006). "Stomping with the elephants: Feminist principles for radical solidarity". Igniting a Revolution: Voices in Defense of the Earth. AK Press. pp. 319–334. ISBN 978-1904859567.
- jones, pattrice (March 1, 2007). Aftershock: Confronting Trauma in a Violent World: A Guide for Activists and Their Allies. Lantern Books. ISBN 978-1590561034. Archived from the original on September 5, 2020.
- A. Breeze Harper (March 1, 2009). "Liberation as Connection and the Decolonization of Desire". Sistah Vegan: Black Female Vegans Speak on Food, Identity, Health and Society. Lantern Books. pp. 187–201. ISBN 978-1590561454. Archived from the original on August 28, 2016.
- Randall Amster; Abraham DeLeon; Luis Fernandez; Anthony J. Nocella, II; Deric Shannon (March 14, 2009). "Free as a bird: natural anarchism in action". Contemporary Anarchist Studies: An Introductory Anthology of Anarchy in the Academy. Routledge. pp. 236–246. ISBN 978-0415474023.
- jones, pattrice (2010). "Roosters, hawks and dawgs: Toward an inclusive, embodied eco/feminist psychology". Feminism and Psychology. 20 (3). SAGE Publications: 365–380. doi:10.1177/0959353510368120. S2CID 143663153.
- Kemmerer, Lisa (May 23, 2011). "Fighting Cocks: Ecofeminism Versus Sexualized Violence". Sister Species: Women, Animals, and Social Justice. University of Illinois Press. pp. 45–56. ISBN 978-0252078118.
- jones, pattrice (May 1, 2014). The Oxen at the Intersection: A Collision. Lantern Books. ISBN 978-1590564622. Archived from the original on June 7, 2023.
- Carol J. Adams; Lori Gruen (July 31, 2014). "Eros and the Mechanisms of Eco-Defense". Ecofeminism: Feminist Intersections with Other Animals and the Earth. Bloomsbury Academic. pp. 91–108. ISBN 978-1628928037.
