= Erkenntnis und wissenschaftliches Verhalten =

1936 book by Arne Næss

- Author: Arne Næss
- Language: German
- Subjects: Epistemology; Philosophy of science
- Publisher: Norske Videnskaps-Akademi
- Publication date: 1936
- Publication place: Norway
- Media type: Print
- Pages: 249
- OCLC: 5916296

Erkenntnis und wissenschaftliches Verhalten (English: Cognition and Scientific Behavior) is a 1936 book by the Norwegian philosopher Arne Næss. The work was influential and anticipated many themes familiar in subsequent analytic philosophy.

== Publication history ==
Erkenntnis und wissenschaftliches Verhalten was published in 1936 by Norske Videnskaps-Akademi (the Norwegian Academy of Science and Letters).

== Reception ==
Erkenntnis und wissenschaftliches Verhalten received a positive review from the psychologist Egon Brunswik in Philosophy of Science. Brunswik wrote that psychology was gaining increased importance within philosophy and the sciences by becoming its "preferred center of organization", and that Næss's book was part of this trend. He believed that Næss presented a "new and modernistic" version of psychology that was more promising than the "psychologism" of the late 19th century, maintaining that Næss emphasized "objective psychology" over "subjectivistic" ideas. He credited Næss with an impressive "revolutionary keenness" in the way he questioned "the absolute character of the antagonism between the empirical and the logical, and, within the latter, between true and false." He concluded that Næss's book was an "interesting and promising first publication."

The book was also reviewed in Theoria. A Swedish Journal of Philosophy and Psychology. Næss replied to the review.

The philosopher Alastair Hannay states that Erkenntnis und wissenschaftliches Verhalten is a seminal work, in which Næss anticipates many themes familiar in post-war analytic philosophy. The historian and philosopher of science Friedrich Stadler commented that it was regrettable that the work was not included in Næss's Selected Papers.
