= Queen Afua =

American vegan author

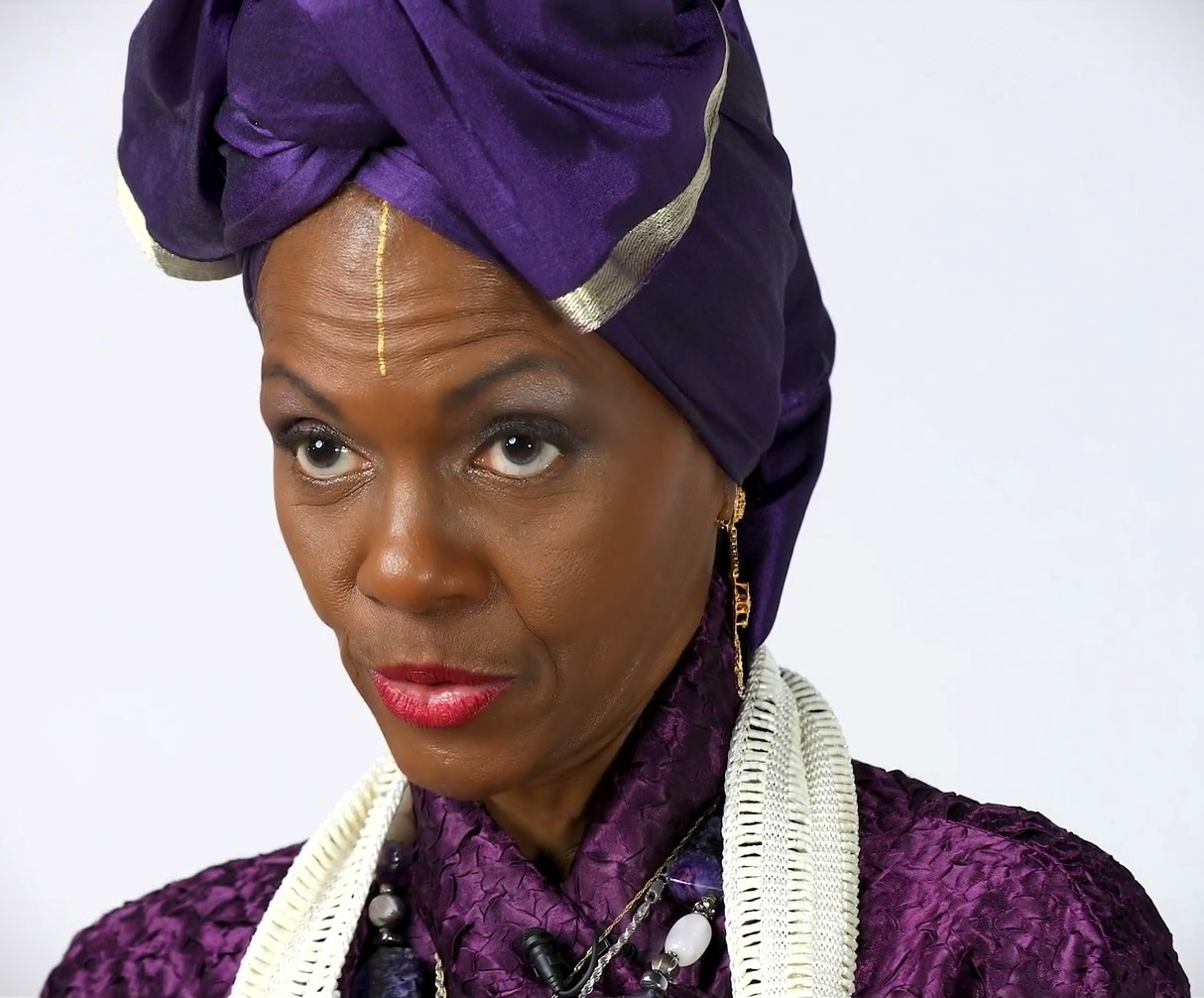
- Queen Afua in a trailer for the film Sacred Woman (2019)
- Born: Helen Odel Robinson; August 13, 1953 (age 72)
- Years active: 1991–present
- Known for: Alternative medicine and wellness education; veganism
- Notable work: Sacred Woman

Helen Odel Robinson (born August 13, 1953), known professionally as Queen Afua, is an American writer, alternative medicine practitioner, and wellness coach. She is an influential figure in Black veganism.

== Early life ==
By her own account, Robinson began pursuing holistic health as a career when she developed asthma and severe allergies as a high school student, preventing her from studying abroad. She decided to experiment by traveling to upstate New York without her inhaler or medications, risking her health by treating her symptoms with guidance from herbalist John E. Moore. A self-trained educator, Moore emphasized using self-reliance and locally available herbs to treat ailments. Robinson found relief using these natural methods and decided to work as a full-time healer. She was eventually able to travel to Ghana, where a mentor named Baba Kwame Ishangi granted her the name Queen Afua.

== Career ==
As Queen Afua, Robinson opened wellness centers in six U.S. states and Saint Thomas, U.S. Virgin Islands. She reported in 1995 that 10,000 customers had come to her center in Prospect Heights, Brooklyn. In 2000, she opened a center in Washington, D.C. Her 2001 book Sacred Woman has remained in print for over twenty years.

In her books and talks, she emphasizes the importance of a vegan diet, referring to meat and dairy as "dead" foods and fruits, and vegetables and grains as "living" foods. She also advises to eat baked and broiled foods and avoid consuming fried food, and suggests using herbs and herbal baths for medical purposes. She also connects poor dietary habits to the legacy of slavery, urging listeners and readers to break free from typical American comfort foods. Scholar A. Breeze Harper describes her writing as grounding veganism in "decolonial body politics" and antiracism, themes rarely found in white vegan publications. Afua's writing on women's health defines the womb as the "sacred organ of reproduction" and describes it as "foundational to healing all other aspects of the body" and "a physical and spiritual site of activism," although she also includes and recognizes women who cannot or can no longer reproduce.

In 2021, her visit to Ghana was highlighted by the Ghana Tourism Authority.

=== Notable clients and collaborators ===
New York City Mayor Eric Adams and musician Erykah Badu have cited Queen Afua's work as having inspired them to become vegan.

Other clients have included Stevie Wonder, Roberta Flack, and Vanessa Williams.

Afua's work was also endorsed by Nipsey Hussle and his widow, Lauren London. Afua has collaborated with London, Erykah Badu, and Beverly Bond.

In 2021, she marketed a wellness program together with singer and actress Mýa.

=== Brooklyn land ownership dispute ===
In 2018, a landlord named Menachem Gurevitch filed an eviction claim against Afua and her family, saying that he had purchased her home and the Brooklyn headquarters of her wellness center network from her 98-year-old mother Ida Robinson. Afua and her family disputed the eviction, claiming that Ida had been defrauded of her title with confusing documents. In 2022, dozens of activists from the Chabad movement stormed Afua's house attempting to evict her family by force while chanting "Death to Arabs" in Hebrew. A court ruled in favor of Afua in 2024, and the Brooklyn district attorney has announced an investigation of the alleged title fraud.

== Personal life ==
In Los Angeles, Queen Afua lived with her mentee and roommate, the vegan chef Lauren Von Der Pool.

Her two sons, SupaNova Slom and Ali Torain, are also vegan.

== Bibliography ==
- Heal Thyself with Health and Longevity (1991)
- Sacred Woman (2001)
- The City of Wellness: Restoring Your Health through the Seven Kitchens of Consciousness (2009)
- Overcoming an Angry Vagina: Journey to Womb Wellness (2010)
- Heal Thyself for Health and Longevity (2012)
- Sacred Women: 84 Day Healing Journal (2016)
- Circle of wellness: a guide to planting, cultivating & harvesting wellness (2019)
