= Marti Kheel =

American activist (1948–2011)

- Born: Martha L. Kheel; August 25, 1948; New York City, US
- Died: November 19, 2011 (aged 63); Greenwich, Connecticut, US
- Occupation: Scholar

Academic background
- Education: University of Wisconsin
- Alma mater: McGill University

Academic work
- Notable works: Nature Ethics: An Ecofeminist Perspective

Marti Kheel (August 25, 1948 – November 19, 2011) was an American vegan ecofeminist activist scholar credited with founding Feminists for Animal Rights (FAR) in California in 1982. She authored several books in deep ecology and ecofeminism, including Nature Ethics: An Ecofeminist Perspective and several widely cited articles in college courses and related scholarship, such as "The Liberation of Nature: A Circular Affair", "From Heroic to Holistic Ethics: The Ecofeminist Challenge", and "From Healing Herbs to Deadly Drugs: Western Medicine's War Against the Natural World". She was a long-time vegan in diet, lifestyle, and philosophical commitments, working out her understanding of its implications in every area of our human relationships with nature and its constituents, and she found a wide audience for those deep reflections. Reportedly, she had pursued a raw vegan diet later in her life. Her pioneering scholarship in ecofeminist ethics is foundational for continuing work in these fields.

== Early life ==
Kheel was one of six children (five daughters: Ellen Kheel Jacobs of Manhattan; Constance E. Kheel of Buskirk, N.Y.; Dr. Marti Kheel, then of El Cerrito, California; Jane Kheel Stanley of Bethesda, Maryland; and Katherine Kheel of Baltimore, Maryland; a son, Robert J. Kheel, of Manhattan) born to Labor Mediator Theodore W. Kheel (who passed in November 2010), and journalist and civic leader Ann Sunstein Kheel, who passed in 2003.

She was born in New York City on August 25, 1948. She is described as being "drawn to other–than–human animals." She related on her website how, around 1960, when she was twelve years old, she first protested on behalf of animals when she refused to be photographed in a family photograph without her cat, Booty–tat. She became vegetarian in 1973 (age 25) through a developing awareness occasioned, by a series of troubling experiences in restaurants and grocery stores, in which she became increasingly aware of the living beings who were defined as "meat" and killed for that interpretation. Four years later, she joined the grass–roots Animal Liberation Collective while living in Montreal, and explored a wide spectrum of animal abuse issues. She became a vegan as she progressively grew more aware of the horrific treatment of nonhumans on farms and in human society's systematic oppression of nonhumans.

She co–founded Feminists for Animal Rights (FAR) in California in 1982, to which she had relocated, hoping to bridge women's and animal advocacy movements. That same year, she developed a slideshow paralleling how women and other–than–human animals are viewed under hierarchical domination characteristic of 'patriarchal' society. Under the auspices of FAR, which she cofounded, the presentation has since been shown throughout the United States and abroad. Over the years, FAR grew into a national organization with regional offices throughout and beyond the United States with a message of 'shared oppression' that continues to inspire, although FAR is not currently active.

Much of Kheel's research and print materials have been archived in Schlesinger Library at Harvard University, including an unpublished commentary on Alan Drengson's work with Canadian environmental philosophy journal The Trumpeter.

== Education ==
- B.A. (History), University of Wisconsin
- M.A. (Sociology), McGill University
- Ph.D. (Religious studies, environmental ethics), Graduate Theological Union (2000), Berkeley, CA

Most recently she was a visiting scholar in the Department of Environmental Science, Policy, and Management at the University of California, Berkeley.

== Publications ==
BOOK

Nature Ethics: An Ecofeminist Perspective. Lanham, MD: Rowman & Littlefield, 2008. ISBN 0-7425-5201-2.

Outline, Excerpts, and Reviews of Nature Ethics:

- Book Overview
- Reviews for Nature Ethics
- Book Excerpt: from Chapter 1
- Book Excerpt: from the Conclusion
- Purchase Nature Ethics

CHAPTERS IN OTHER BOOKS

- "Direct Action and the Heroic Ideal: An Ecofeminist Critique." In Igniting a Revolution: Voices in Defense of the Earth, edited by Anthony J. Nocella and Steve Best, 306–318. Oakland, CA: AK Press, 2006. Read excerpt.
- "Vegetarianism and Ecofeminism: Toppling Patriarchy with a Fork." In Food for Thought: The Debate Over Eating Meat, edited by Steve F. Sapontzis, 327–341. Amherst, NY: Prometheus Books, 2004. (© 2004 by Steve F. Sapontzis. All rights reserved.) Read essay. [PDF]
- "The History of Vegetarianism" in Krech III, Shepard; Merchant, Carolyn; McNeill, John Robert, eds. (2004). Encyclopedia of World Environmental History. Vol. 3. US: Routledge. pp. 1273–1278.
- "License to Kill: An Ecofeminist Critique of Hunters' Discourse." In Animals and Women: Feminist Theoretical Explorations, edited by Carol J. Adams and Josephine Donovan, 85–125. Durham, NC: Duke University Press, 1995. Read excerpt.
- "From Heroic to Holistic Ethics: The Ecofeminist Challenge." [PDF] In Ecofeminism: Women, Animals, Nature, edited by Greta Gaard, 243–271. Philadelphia: Temple University Press, 1993. Reprinted in Feminist Philosophies: Problems Theories and Applications, 2nd ed., edited by Janet A. Kourany, James P. Sterba, and Rosemarie Tong, 462–472 (Englewood Cliffs, NJ: Prentice Hall, 1999), and Earth Ethics: Environmental Ethics, Animal Rights and Practical Applications, 2nd ed., edited by James P. Sterba, 199–212 (Englewood Cliffs, NJ: Prentice Hall, 2000). Read essay.[PDF]
- "Ecofeminism and Deep Ecology: Reflections on Identity and Difference." InReweaving the World: The Emergence of Ecofeminism, edited by Irene Diamond and Gloria Orenstein, 128–137. San Francisco: Sierra Club Publishers, 1990. Reprinted (expanded version) in Covenant for a New Creation: Ethics, Religion, and Public Policy, edited by Carol Robb and Carl Casebolt, 141–164 (Maryknoll, NY: Orbis Press, 1991), and (revised) in The Trumpeter: A Journal of Ecosophy 8, no. 2 (Spring 1991): 55–63.
- "From Healing Herbs to Deadly Drugs: Western Medicine's War Against the Natural World." In Healing the Wounds: The Promise of Ecofeminism, edited by Judith Plant, 96–111. Philadelphia: New Society Publishers, 1989. Reprinted in The Townshend Letter for Doctors 102 (January 1992): 1, 9–15, and (excerpts) in Living with Contradictions: Controversies in Feminist Social Ethics, edited by Alison M. Jaggar, 650–657 (Boulder, CO: Westview Press, 1994). Translated into Chinese by Wu Pei for Environment and Society 3.4 (December 2000): 55–63. Read essay. [PDF]

JOURNAL ARTICLES

- Communicating Care: An Ecofeminist Perspective," Media Development (February 2009): 45–50. Read article.
- "World Day for Laboratory Animals." Between the Species 3 (August 2003).
- "The Killing Game: An Ecofeminist Critique of Hunting." Journal of the Philosophy of Sport 23, no. 1 (May 1996): 30–44. Reprinted (excerpts) in The Animal Ethics Reader, edited by Susan J. Armstrong and Richard G. Botzler, 390–399 (New York: Routledge, 2006). Read article.
- "If Women and Animals Were Heard." Feminists for Animal Rights Semiannual Publication 5 (Summer/Fall 1990): 1, 10.
- "Liberazione Animale Ed Etica Ambientale puo L'Ecofeminismo Accorciare Le Distanza?" [Animal Liberation and Environmental Ethics: Can Ecofeminism Bridge the Gap?]. Translated by Paola Cavalieri. Etica e Animali 11, no. 1 (1989).
- "Animal Liberation Is a Feminist Issue." The New Catalyst Quarterly 10 (Winter 1988): 8–9.
- "Befriending the Beast." Creation 3 (September/October 1987): 11–14.
- "The Liberation of Nature: A Circular Affair." Environmental Ethics 7 (Summer 1985): 135–149. Reprinted (excerpts, under the title "Nature and Feminist Sensitivity") inAnimal Rights and Human Obligations, 2nd ed., edited by Tom Regan and Peter Singer, 256–265 (Englewood Cliffs, NJ: Prentice Hall, 1989); (excerpts) in Thirteen Questions in Ethics, edited by G. Lee Bowie, Kathleen Huggins, and Meredith Michaels, 515–523 (New York: Harcourt Brace and Jovanovich, 1992); and in The Feminist Care Tradition in Animal Ethics, edited by Josephine Donovan and Carol J. Adams, 39–53 (New York: Columbia University Press, 2007).
- "Speaking the Unspeakable: Sexism in the Animal Rights Movement." Feminists for Animal Rights Newsletter 2 (Summer/Fall 1985): 1–7.
- "An/Aesthetics: The Re–Presentation of Women and Animals." Between the Species1 (Spring 1985): 37–45.

== Lecture appearances ==
- Monday, June 27, 2011 – 7:00 pm – Presentation on Nature Ethics: An Ecofeminist Perspective at Red Emma's Bookstore Coffeehouse in Baltimore, MD. More details | Facebook event page.
- June 4–12, 2011 – "Gender, Flesh and Dietary Identity." Presentation at the International Vegan Festival, Malaga, Spain. More details.
- December 1, 2010 – "Is Moral Concern for Animals 'sustainable'?" Presentation for the Women's, Gender and Sexuality Studies series at the University of Cincinnati, organized by assistant professor Adrian Parr and funded by the Faculty Development Council. Download / view flyer on series. [PDF]
- October 19, 2010 – "The Contribution of Ecofeminism to Animal Ethics." Presentation at the Federal University of Santa Catarina, Florianópolis, Brazil University website.
- October 9–12, 2010 – "Coming Out Vegan: What Animal Activists Can Learn from the Lesbian and Gay Movements," and "The Ecology of Social Change: Lessons for Animal Activists." Presentations at Encontro Nacional de Direitos Animais (National Animal Rights Gathering), Porangaba, Brazil. More details.
- July 15–19, 2010 – Two presentations at the Animal Rights 2010 National Conference, Alexandria, VA. "Lunch with the Authors" will take place on July 17. The other authors include Michael Budkie, Melanie Joy, Roberta Kalechofsky, and Dara Lovitz. "Commonality in the Oppression of Animals, Children, Women, Minorities" panel presentation will take place on July 18. Other panelists include pattrice jones, Stephen R. Kaufman, and lauren Ornelas. More details.
- May 2, 2010 "Reclaiming our Kind Nature" online interview for SupremeMaster TV on ecofemininism and reclaiming our capacity for empathy. This video interview outlines how Dr. Kheel's life helped her configure her worldview of compassion and sensitivity towards others. [14:30]
- April 7, 2010 — 8:00PM – Feminist Perspectives on Veganism," a free public lecture at Georgetown University, White Gravenor Hall, Room 206, Washington DC. Sponsored by the Department of Culture & Politics.
- April 16, 2010 – "Religious and Spiritual Reflections on Seeing and Being Seen by Other Animals," panel presentation at "Troubling Recognition: Seeing Animals, Seeing Ourselves," the 2nd Annual "Do Unto Others" Animals and Religion Conference. Chapman University, Orange, CA. More details.
- April 17, 2010 – "Feminism and Animal Liberation: Making the Links," presentation at the 2nd annual Animal Liberation Forum. Sponsored by Cease Animal Torture (CAT), California State University, and Long Beach University. https://vimeo.com/15088578 More details].
- February 18, 2010 — 5:00PM–7:00PM – "Author-Meets-Critic: Marti Kheel's Nature Ethics: An Ecofeminist Perspective," panel presentation at the Palmer House Hilton, Chicago, IL. Sponsored by the International Society for Environmental Ethics, held in conjunction with the Central Division meeting of the American Philosophical Association.
- November 3, 2009 – 6:30 pm – "Ecofeminism and Conservation Management: A Contradiction in Terms?" Noel Fine Arts Center (NFAC), Room 221, University of Wisconsin-Stevens Point. Sponsored by the UWSP Department of Philosophy, Office of Multicultural Affairs, and Women's Studies Department. Download flyer. [PDF]
- July 26, 2009 – "Ecofeminism and Animal Ethics," presentation at Kindness House, Melbourne, Australia. Sponsored by the Winsome Constance Kindness Trust.
- July 13–18, 2009 – "Beyond the Model of Abstinence: An Ecofeminist Approach to Veganism," presentation for the Minding Animals International Academic & Community Conference. Newcastle, Australia. View the conference themes and objectives.
- May 20, 2009 – Interview with Erin Scott of the Palo Alto Humane Society on empathy and the ecology of care. This video interview outlines how Dr. Kheel's life helped her configure her worldview of compassion and sensitivity towards others. [8:27]
- February 4, 2009 – "Women, Nature, and Animals: Ecofeminist Reflections," a presentation for a series on Gender. University of Osnabrueck, Osnabrueck, Germany. Sponsored by the Equal Opportunities Office of Osnabruek University. Download flyer. [PDF]
- November 1–3, 2008 – "Feminist Perspectives on Vegetarianism: Beyond the Model of Abstinence," a paper for the American Academy of Religion Annual Conference. Chicago, IL.
- October 30, 2008 – 7:30 pm – Book Reading at Women and Children First Bookstore. Chicago, IL. Download flyer. [PDF]
- October 8–11 – Presentation on "Ethics and Ecofeminism: A Perspective on the Animal Rights Debate. 1 World Congress on Bioethics and Animal Rights ( I Congresso Mundial de Bioética e Direito Animal) Salvador, Bahia, Brazil. Sponsored by the Instituto Abolicionista Animal.
- October 4–5, 2008 – "Toppling Patriarchy with a Fork: The Radical Potential of Veganism," a presentation at World Veg Festival Weekend. San Francisco, CA.
- List of Marti Kheel's earlier presentations

== Death ==
Marti Kheel died of acute myeloid leukemia at 63 years of age on November 19, 2011, in Greenwich, CT. She was widely memorialized on the Internet, including numerous professional, topical, scholarly, and general e-mail discussion lists.

- 'A Collective Tribute' by Carol J. Adams
- Our Hen House Obituary
- Legacy.com
- Kim Stallwood's tribute
- Food Empowerment Project obituary on Facebook
- The Riverdale Press

== See also ==
- List of animal rights advocates
