= Alan R. Drengson =

Canadian philosopher (1934–2022)

Alan Drengson
- Born: 1934; Canada
- Died: March 6, 2022 (aged 87–88)

Philosophical work
- Main interests: Deep ecology
- Notable works: Beyond Environmental Crisis

Alan R. Drengson (1934–2022) was a Canadian philosopher.

== Background ==
Alan Drengson served as the editor of the Trumpeter: Journal of Ecosophy from 1983 to 1997. Alan Drengson's papers associated with the journal are housed in the archives of the University of Victoria Libraries. Marti Kheel's commentary on Alan Drengson's work with The Trumpeter is held in the Schlesinger Library (Harvard University).

In 1986, Environmental Ethics reported that Drengson had "published in a wide variety of periodicals" and that he had taught courses "in Eastern philosophy, environmental philosophy, philosophy of technology, philosophy of religion, and philosophy of history." In 1994, David Clarke Burks stated that "Alan Drengson is an Associate Professor of philosophy at the University of Victoria, B.C., Canada. He is the founder and editor of The Trumpeter and author of Beyond Environmental Crisis."

Drengon's work has been cited by several other environmental philosophers; for example, in "Cultural Relativism and Environmental Ethics", Lawrence T. Willett wrote that "Environmental philosophers are trying to develop a global ethic; see, e.g. Alan Drengson's definitions in the Trumpeter." In 1989, the Vancouver Sun wrote that Drengson "was raised Christian but no longer attends church."

Drengson wrote the introduction to Arne Næss's The Ecology of Wisdom. Editor Bill Devall wrote "this anthology begins with an exploration of Arne's life and work by Alan Drengson. This essay explores how Arne developed and articulated his own life philosophy grounded in a place."

== Bibliography ==
Per OCLC WorldCat unless cited otherwise.

=== Non-fiction ===
- A Study of Collingwood's Philosophy of History, 1960, OCLC 19787486
- Self Deception, 1971 OCLC 26157664
- Shifting Paradigms: From Technocrat to Planetary Person, 1983, ISBN 9780920578063
- Beyond Environmental Crisis, 1989, ISBN 9780820408712
- Doc Forest and Blue Mountain Ecostery, 1993 ISBN 9780969744801
- An Ecophilosopher's Dictionary: Basic Concepts for Ecocentric Exploration, 1994, OCLC 858525077
- The Practice of Technology, 1995, ISBN 9780791426708
- Ecoforestry: The Art & Science Of Sustainable Forest Use, 2000, ISBN 9780865713659
- Wild Way Home: Spiruality for a New Millennium, 2010, ISBN 9780920578087

=== Edited volumes ===
- The Philosophy of Society, 1978 ISBN 9780416834901
- The Deep Ecology Movement, 1995, ISBN 9781556431982
- The Selected Works of Arne Næss, 2005, ISBN 9781402037276

=== Poetry ===
- Sacred Journey I: Land of Visions and Dreams, 1977, ISBN 9780920578001
- Sacred Journey II: A Wilderness Celebration, 1978 ISBN 9780920578025
- Sacred Journey III: Community in the Sun, 1979, ISBN 9780920578049
