= Hippocrates Health Institute =

American holistic health centre

Alternative medicine
- Claims: "Helping people, help themselves"

The Hippocrates Health Institute (HHI) is a nonprofit organization in West Palm Beach, Florida, US, originally co-founded in 1956 in Stoneham, Massachusetts, by Lithuanian-born Viktoras Kulvinskas and Ann Wigmore.

The Hippocrates Health Institute is regarded as controversial for supposedly treating cancer with unproven natural methods that are implausible despite claims otherwise.

In February and March 2015, cease-and-desist orders were issued against co-directors Brian and Anna-Maria Clement, both of whom represented themselves as doctors, requiring them to immediately cease the unlicensed practice of medicine. The Florida Department of Health formally informed Hippocrates Health Institute that it has subsequently withdrawn and dismissed the cease-and-desist orders due to lack of sufficient evidence.

Brian Clement and his institute have been criticized for promoting a number of ineffective treatments, including ones claimed to "reverse" cancer and multiple sclerosis. Clement is not a medical doctor and his treatments have been widely criticized as ineffective and possibly dangerous. Former staff members of the institute have filed suit against Brian Clement for being fired after raising concerns about ethical wrongdoing in treating patients at the center.

== See also ==
- Alternative cancer treatment
- List of unproven and disproven cancer treatments
