= Josephine Donovan =

American professor

- Born: 1941 (age 84–85); Manila, Philippines
- Education: Bryn Mawr College
- Occupation: Literature scholar

Josephine Donovan (born 1941) is an American scholar of comparative literature who is a professor emerita of English in the Department of English at the University of Maine, Orono. Her research and expertise has covered feminist theory, feminist criticism, animal ethics, and both early modern and American (particularly 19th century) literature with a special focus on American writer Sarah Orne Jewett and the local colorists. She recently extended her study of local color literature to the European tradition. Along with Marti Kheel, Carol J. Adams, and others, Donovan introduced ecofeminist care theory, rooted in cultural feminism, to the field of animal ethics. Her published corpus includes ten books, five edited books, over fifty articles, and seven short stories.

== Life and career ==
Donovan was born in Manila in the Philippines in 1941, and was, with her mother, evacuated shortly before the attack on Pearl Harbor. Her father, a captain in the US Army, remained; in 1942, he was captured by the Japanese. Donovan subsequently edited and published his memoirs. Majoring in history, she studied at Bryn Mawr College, Pennsylvania, graduating, cum laude, in 1962. Subsequently, she worked in journalism, as a clerk on the copy desks at The Washington Post and Time and as a reporter for a small New York newspaper. Concurrent with her work, she studied creative writing at Columbia University. She went on to study at the University of Wisconsin–Madison, reading for an MA (graduating 1967) and a PhD (graduating 1971), both in comparative literature. She subsequently held positions at the University of Kentucky (Honors Program), the University of New Hampshire (as the first coordinator of the Women's Studies Program), and visiting professor positions at George Washington University and the University of Tulsa.), as well as working as a copy editor for G. K. Hall & Co. She took early retirement from her position of professor of English at the University of Maine to allow more time for both research and writing, and is currently a professor emerita.

== Select bibliography ==
=== Books ===
- Sarah Orne Jewett. New York: Ungar, 1980. (Revised edition released by Cybereditions in 2001.)
- New England Local Color Literature: A Women's Tradition. New York: Ungar, 1983.
- Feminist Theory: The Intellectual Traditions. New York: Ungar, 1985. (Second edition released by Continuum in 1992, third edition released by Continuum in 2000, and fourth edition released by Bloomsbury in 2012.)
- After the Fall: The Demeter-Persephone Myth in Wharton, Cather and Glasgow. University Park, PA: Pennsylvania State University Press, 1989.
- Gnosticism in Modern Literature: A Study of Selected Works of Camus, Sartre, Hesse, and Kafka. New York: Garland, 1990.
- Uncle Tom's Cabin: Evil, Affliction, and Redemptive Love. Boston: Twayne, 1991. (Revised edition released by Cybereditions, 2001.)
- Women and the Rise of the Novel, 1405-1726. New York: St. Martin's Press, 1999. (Revised and expanded second edition released by Palgrave Macmillan in 2013.)
- European Local-Color Literature: National Tales, Dorfgeschichten, Romans Champêtres. New York: Bloomsbury, 2010.
- The Aesthetics of Care. On the Literary Treatment of Animals. New York, London, Oxford: Bloomsbury, 2016.
- The Lexington Six: Lesbian and Gay Resistance in 1970s America. Amherst/Boston: University of Massachusetts Press, 2020.
- Animals, Mind, and Matter: The Inside Story. Michigan State University Press, 2022.

=== Edited works ===
- Feminist Literary Criticism: Explorations in Theory. Lexington: University Press of Kentucky, 1975. (Second edition released in 1989.)
- Animals and Women: Feminist Theoretical Explorations. Durham, N.C.: Duke University Press, 1995. (Co-edited with Carol J. Adams).
- Beyond Animal Rights: A Feminist Caring Ethic for the Treatment of Animals. New York: Continuum, 1996. (Co-edited with Carol J. Adams).
- P. O. W. in the Pacific: Memoirs of an American Doctor in World War II. Wilmington, Del.: Scholarly Resources, 1998. (By William N. Donovan).
- The Feminist Care Tradition in Animal Ethics: A Reader. New York: Columbia University Press, 2007. (Co-edited with Carol J. Adams).

== See also ==
- List of vegans
