= March for the Animals =

June 10 1990 animal March in Washington

The March for the Animals on June 10, 1990 was a significant early protest by the Animal Rights Movement in Washington D.C. An estimated 25,000 animal rights activists gathered for the march. The event however did not immediately attract significant media attention, and was relatively small among List of rallies and protest marches in Washington, D.C. compared, for example, to the Rally for Life in January 1990 which had gathered 700,000 people. Among the celebrity supporters of the march was singer Grace Slick who performed the Jefferson Airplane song "Panda" from the band's final album of the previous year. The majority of marchers were women, but female activists were not the majority of speakers on the roster.
