= Lantern Books =

American non-profit book publisher

Lantern Publishing & Media is an American non-profit book publisher founded in 2020, having acquired the assets of Booklight Inc. DBA Lantern Books in 2019. Booklight was founded in 1999, and first located in Union Square (New York City), before moving to Brooklyn in 2007, where Lantern Publishing & Media had its offices, before moving to Woodstock, NY, in 2022. The subject areas that Lantern Publishing & Media covers include veganism, animal rights, humane education, spirituality, wellness and recovery, and social justice. Lantern distributes books published by the American Mental Health Foundation, and is in turn distributed by Red Wheel Weiser.

== Notable authors ==
- Carol J. Adams, feminist and animal rights activist
- Brooks Brown, survivor of the Columbine High School massacre and author of No Easy Answers: The Truth Behind Death at Columbine High School
- Jo-Anne McArthur, award-winning photojournalist and founder of We Animals Media
- Ingrid Newkirk, founding president of People for the Ethical Treatment of Animals (PETA)
- Thomas Keating, American Roman Catholic monk, and co-founder of Contemplative Outreach
- A. Breeze Harper, editor of Sistah Vegan: Black Women Speak on Food, Identity, Health, and Society (10th Anniversary Edition)
- Patricia Wright, primatologist and conservationist
- Eric Adams, Mayor of New York City, Brooklyn borough president and contributor to Brotha Vegan: Black Men Speak on Food, Identity, Health, and Society
- Basheer Ahmad Masri, Indian Islamic scholar and animal welfare writer

== Selected books ==
- Adewale, Omowale, editor. Brotha Vegan: Black Men Speak on Food, Identity, Health, and Society, 2021. ISBN 978-1-59056-598-8
- Best, Steven; Nocella, Anthony J. Terrorists or Freedom Fighters? Reflections on the Liberation of Animals, 2004. ISBN 978-1-59056-054-9
- Brown, Brooks; Merritt, Rob. No Easy Answers: The Truth Behind Death at Columbine, 2002. ISBN 978-1-59056-031-0
- Keating, Thomas. Divine Therapy and Addiction, 2011. ISBN 978-1-59056-115-7
- Ko, Aph; Ko, Syl. Aphro-Ism: Essays on Pop Culture, Feminism, and Black Veganism from Two Sisters, 2017. ISBN 978-1-59056-555-1
- McArthur, Jo-Anne. We Animals (paperback edition), 2017. ISBN 978-1-59056-546-9
- Pozatek, Krissy. The Parallel Process: Growing Alongside Your Adolescent or Young Adult Child in Treatment, 2010. ISBN 978-1-59056-236-9
- Tuttle, Will. The World Peace Diet: Tenth Anniversary Edition, 2016. ISBN 978-1-59056-527-8
- Wright, Patricia. For the Love of Lemurs (paperback edition), 2016. ISBN 978-1-59056-547-6
