= Alastair Hannay =

Norwegian philosopher (1932–2024)

Robert Alastair Hannay
- Born: 2 June 1932; Plymouth, England
- Died: 8 December 2024 (aged 92); Horten, Vestfold, Norway

Philosophical work
- Era: Contemporary
- Region: Western
- School: Continental
- Main interests: Ethics, history of philosophy, existentialism
- Notable ideas: Focus on and from the first person

Robert Alastair Hannay (2 June 1932 – 8 December 2024) was a British-born Norwegian philosopher and academic who was a professor emeritus at the University of Oslo.

== Life and career ==
Hannay was born in Plymouth, England on 2 June 1932. He was educated in Edinburgh and London, where he studied under A. J. Ayer and Bernard Williams, and was a resident of Norway from 1961.

Hannay wrote extensively on the writings of Søren Kierkegaard. His book "The Public" (2004) as well as examining the roles of the 'public' as audience and political participant, brings several Kierkegaardian insights to bear on contemporary political life. Hannay wrote a novella (2020) and several pocket books on philosophical themes, as well as a memoir (2020). From 2006 to 2020, he was a member of the team translating Kierkegaard's complete journals and notebooks.

He was inducted into the Norwegian Academy of Science and Letters in 1991.

Hannay died in Horten, Vestfold, Norway on 8 December 2024, at the age of 92.

== Bibliography ==
=== Books ===
- Alastair Hannay, The Special Messenger: Rediscovering Kierkegaard, Edinburgh: Zeticula/Humming Earth, 2022, ISBN 978-1-84622-079-1.
- –––––––––, Odes to Joy and the Perils of a Single Society, Edinburgh: Zeticula/Humming Earth, 2021, ISBN 978-1-84622-078-4.
- –––––––––, In and With the Beginning: A Wider-eyed and Open-minded Look at the Conscious Life, Edinburgh: Zeticula/Humming Earth, 2020, ISBN 978-1-84622-075-3
- –––––––––, Hello and Goodbye, Horace Hardcover: On Doubt, Certainty, the Faces of Love and Some Other Things, Third Edition, Edinburgh: Kennedy & Boyd, 2022, ISBN 978-1-849-21135-2.
- –––––––––, Not All at Sea. A Memoir, Edinburgh: Kennedy & Boyd, 2020, ISBN 978-1-84921-208-3.
- –––––––––, Kierkegaard: Existence and Identity in a Post-Secular World, London: Bloomsbury Academic, 2020 ISBN 978-1-3501-4468-2.
- –––––––––, Søren Kierkegaard, Critical Lives, London: Reaktion, 2018, ISBN 978-1-78023-923-1.
- Alastair Hannay, and Gordon D. Marino (editors), The Cambridge Companion to Kierkegaard, Cambridge: Cambridge University Press, 1998, ISBN 0-521-47719-0.
- Alastair HannayHuman Consciousness (Problems of Philosophy: Their Past and Present), London; New York: Routledge (November 1990), ISBN 0-415-03299-7.
- –––––––––, Kierkegaard (The Arguments of the Philosophers), Routledge; New Edition (December 1999), ISBN 0-415-06365-5.
- –––––––––, Kierkegaard: A Biography, Cambridge University Press, New edition 2003, ISBN 0-521-53181-0.
- –––––––––, Kierkegaard and Philosophy: Selected Essays, London; New York: Routledge, paperback 2006.
- –––––––––, and Bruce H. Kirmmse, Niels Jorgen Cappelorn, George Pattison, Jon Stewart (editors), Søren Kierkegaard (author), Kierkegaard's Journals and Notebooks: Volumes I-11: Princeton University Press, 2006–2020, ISBN 0-691-09222-2.
- –––––––––, Mental Images: A Defence (Muirhead Library of Philosophy), Humanities Press/Routledge (1971, repr. 2002), ISBN 0-04-100030-7.
- –––––––––, On the Public, Routledge; 1 edition, (13 July 2005), ISBN 0-415-32792-X.
- ––––––––– and Andrew Feenberg (editors), Technology and the Politics of Knowledge (Indiana Series in the Philosophy of Technology), Indiana University Press (May 1995), ISBN 0-253-20940-4.

=== Translations ===
- Søren Kierkegaard, Either/Or, Penguin Books, ISBN 0-14-044577-3.
- Søren Kierkegaard, Fear and Trembling, Penguin Books, ISBN 0-14-044449-1.
- Søren Kierkegaard, Journals and Papers: A Selection,ISBN 0-14-044589-7.
- Søren Kierkegaard, A Literary Review, Penguin Books, ISBN 0-14-044801-2.
- Søren Kierkegaard, The Sickness Unto Death, Penguin Books, ISBN 0-14-044533-1.
- Søren Kierkegaard, "Concluding Unscientific Postscript", Cambridge UP, ISBN 978-0-521-88247-7.
- Søren Kierkegaard, "The Concept of Anxiety", Liveright Publishing Corporation/W.W. Norton, ISBN 978-0-87140-719-1

=== Essays ===
- Hannay, Alastair, "Despair as Defiance: Kierkegaard’s Definitions in “The Sickness unto Death”", Open Philosophy vol. 1, 2018. Open Access: https://doi.org/10.1515/opphil-2018-0004
- –––––––––, "Translating Kierkegaard", in J. Lippitt and G. Pattison (eds.), "The Oxford Handbook of Kierkegaard", Oxford UP, 2013, ISBN 978-0-19-960130-1.
- –––––––––, "Kierkegaard: the Pathologist," in Enrahonar, 29, 1998, pp. 109–114.
- –––––––––, "Kierkegaardian Despair and the Irascible Soul," in Kierkegaard Studies – Yearbook, 1997, pp. 51–69.
- –––––––––, "Basic Despair in the Sickness Unto Death," in Kierkegaard Studies-Yearbook, 1996, pp. 15–32.
- –––––––––, "Paradigmatic Despair and the Quest for a Kierkegaardian Anthropology," in Kierkegaard Studies-Yearbook, 1996, pp. 149–163.
- –––––––––, "Conscious Episodes and Ceteris Paribus", The Monist, 78:4, 1995, pp. 447–463.
- –––––––––, "Consciousness and the Experience of Freedom," in John Searle and His Critics, (Philosophers and their Critics) by Ernest Lepore (Editor), Walter Gulick (Editor), Wiley-Blackwell (15 April 1993) ISBN 0-631-18702-2, ISBN 978-0-631-18702-8
- –––––––––, "To See a Mental Image," in Mind, April 1973, pp. 161–182.
- –––––––––, "Wollheim and Seeing Black on White As A Picture," in British Journal of Aesthetics, 10, 1970, pp. 107–118.

== See also ==
- The Oxford Companion to Philosophy
