= A. Breeze Harper =

African-American critical race feminist and writer

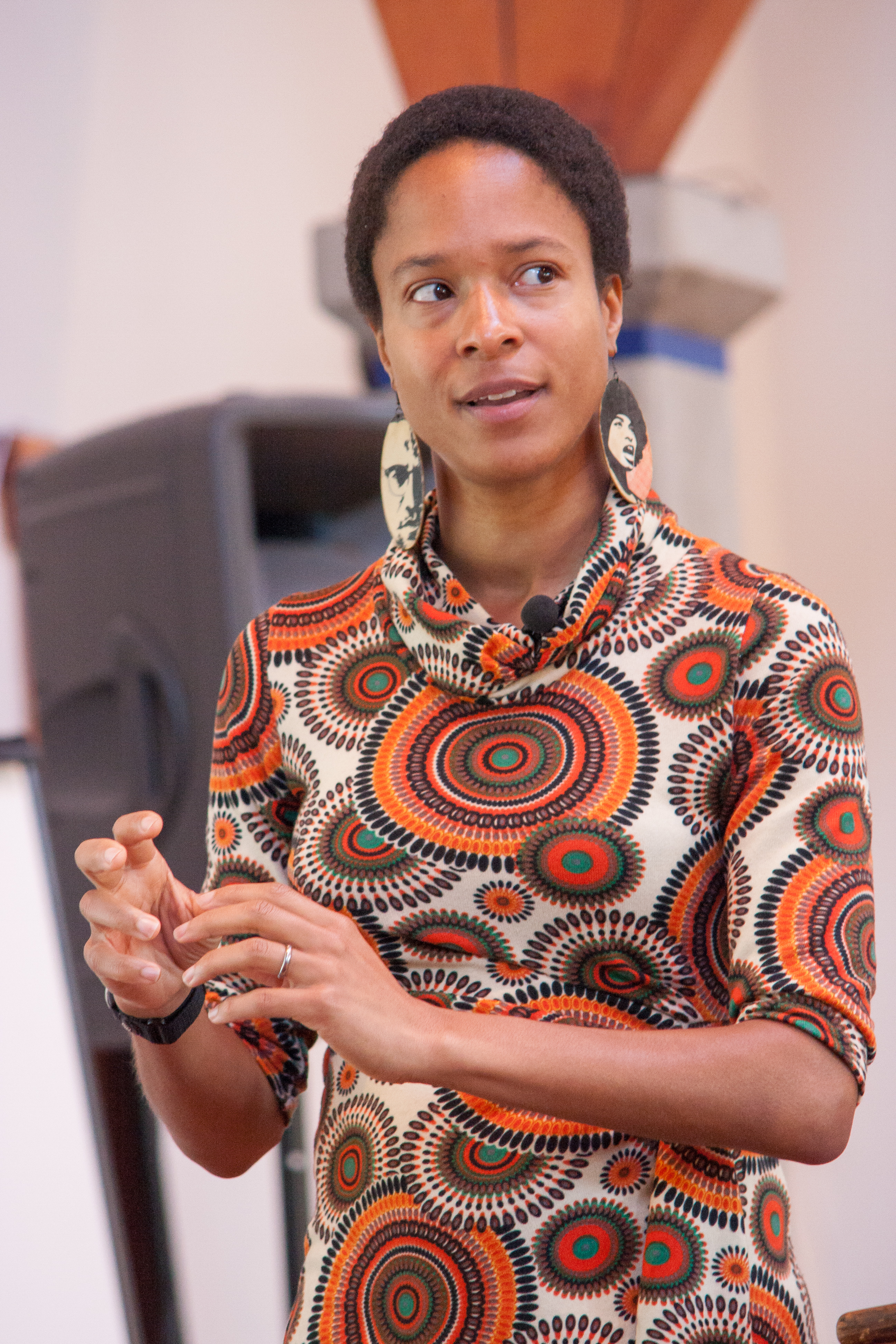
- A. Breeze Harper speaking at the Intersectional Justice Conference at the Whidbey Institute
- Education: Dartmouth College (BA); Harvard University (ALM); University of California, Davis (PhD)
- Occupation: Writer Speaker Diversity strategist
- Known for: Critical race theory Feminism Veganism
- Notable work: Sistah Vegan: Black Female Vegans Speak on Food, Identity, Health, and Society (2010)
- Website: drbreezeharper.com

Amie "Breeze" Harper is an American critical race feminist, diversity strategist, and author of books and studies on veganism and racism. Her Sistah Vegan anthology features a collection of writings by black female vegans.

== Life and career ==
Harper attributes her initial interest in practicing veganism to the influence of the work of Dick Gregory in connecting diet to the liberation struggle of marginalized groups, and to Afrocentric, raw foodist Queen Afua.

In 2015, Harper organized a conference, The Vegan Praxis of Black Lives Matters, to discuss intersectional issues concerning veganism and the Black Lives Matter movement. In the same year, Harper joined the advisory board for Black Vegans Rock.

Harper was the Humane Party's vice-presidential nominee for the 2016 U.S. presidential election.

== Publications ==
- A. Breeze Harper (March 1, 2009). Sistah Vegan: Black Female Vegans Speak on Food, Identity, Health and Society. Lantern Books. ISBN 978-1590561454. Archived from the original on August 28, 2016.
- Amie Breeze Harper (2010). "Race as a 'Feeble Matter' in Veganism: Interrogating Whiteness, Geopolitical Privilege, and Consumption Philosophy of 'Cruelty-Free' Products". Journal for Critical Animal Studies. 8 (3): 5–27.
- D. Ndirangu Wachanga (May 31, 2011). Cultural Identity and New Communication Technologies: Political, Ethnic and Ideological Implications. Hershey, PA: IGI Global. pp. 235–255. ISBN 9781609605919. "Chapter 12: Veganporn.com & 'Sistah': Explorations of Whiteness through Textual Linguistic Cyberminstrelsy on the Internet"
- Alison Hope Alkon; Julian Agyeman (October 21, 2011). Cultivating Food Justice: Race, Class, and Sustainability. MIT Press. pp. 221–238. ISBN 978-0262516327. Chapter 10: "Vegans of color, racialized embodiment, and problematics of the 'exotic'"
- Psyche Williams Forson; Carole Counihan (September 13, 2013). Taking Food Public: Redefining Foodways in a Changing World. Routledge. pp. 155–174. ISBN 9781134726271. Chapter 12: "Going Beyond the Normative White 'Post-Racial' Vegan Epistemology"
- A. Breeze Harper (September 12, 2014). Scars: A Black Lesbian Experience in Rural White New England. Sense Publishers. ISBN 978-9462097599.

== See also ==
- Critical race theory
