= The Trumpeter (magazine) =

- Categories: Creative writing, environmental philosophy
- Frequency: Annual
- Publisher: Athabasca University
- First issue: 1983
- Country: Canada
- Website: trumpeter.athabascau.ca
- ISSN: 0832-6193
- OCLC: 47360295

The Trumpeter is a Canadian annual environmental philosophy and creative writing magazine.

== History ==
The Trumpeter was founded in 1983 at the University of Victoria. In 2001, the International Encyclopedia of the Social & Behavioral Sciences clarified that The Trumpeter was edited Alan R. Drengson from 1983 to 1997 and that "subsequently, it has continued as an on-line journal, under the editorship of Bruce Morito.” Although the Trumpeter was initially published by the University of Victoria, it is now published by Athabasca University.

== Structure ==
Although the magazine is primarily focused on environmental philosophy, it has also published creative writing such as poetry, provided those writings employ naturalist or ecological imagery. In 1995, Warwick Fox explained that the Trumpeter "began to be numbered consecutively across issues within a volume" beginning in 1988.

== Impact ==
In 1990, the Institute for Research on Public Policy stated that "the academic journal The Trumpeter, published at the University of Victoria with Professor Alan Drengson as editor, offers one Canadian vehicle for continuing dissemination of scholarly work on philosophical foundations underlying environmental issues.” In 1995, Yuichi Inoue wrote that the magazine was established "specifically to disseminate ecosophies in support of the deep ecology movement." In 2006, Donald Edward Davis described the Trumpeter as “the principal voice of the North American Deep Ecology movement for nearly two decades.” The Trumpeter has been cited and discussed extensively in the University of North Texas' peer-reviewed academic journal Environmental Ethics. (Note: As of 2021, Environmental Ethics has referenced The Trumpeter 25 times.)

== In libraries ==
Alan Drengson's papers associated with The Trumpeter are housed in the archives of the University of Victoria Libraries. Marti Kheel's commentary on Alan Drengson's work with The Trumpeter is held in the Schlesinger Library (Harvard University).

== See also ==
- Canadian literature
- Deep ecology
