= Aph Ko =

American writer and digital media producer

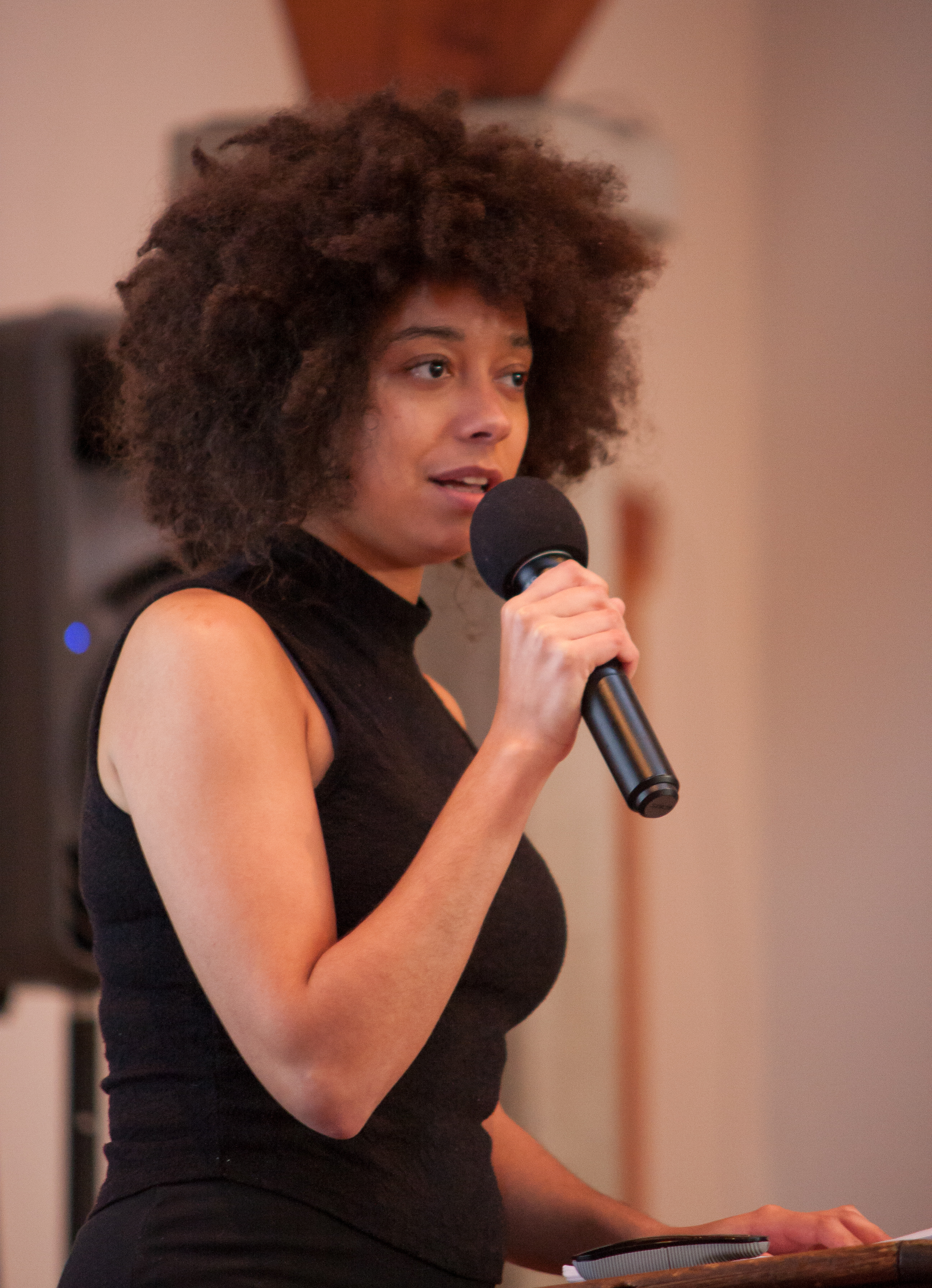
- Ko in 2016
- Occupation: writer; activist
- Language: English
- Education: (B.A.) (M.A.)
- Genre: feminism; veganism

Website
- aphko.wordpress.com

Aph Ko is an American writer, vegan activist, and digital media producer. She is the author of Racism as Zoological Witchcraft: A Guide to Getting Out (2019), co-author of Aphro-ism: Essays on Pop Culture, Feminism, and Black Veganism from Two Sisters (2017), and creator of the website Black Vegans Rock.

== Early life and education ==
Ko has an older sister, Syl. Ko became a vegetarian in high school. She has a B.A. in Women’s and Gender Studies and an M.A. in Communication/Media Studies.

== Philosophy ==
Ko believes that "Racism uses animality as a vehicle to oppress any being that is not considered "human". She objects to common comparisons of animal exploitation to enslavement of humans. According to the UK Centre for Animal Law, "citing the frequent metaphorical use of nonhuman animals to discuss racism and racial violence, Ko encourages her readers not to view violence against nonhumans as merely comparative to that which people of colour experience by the dominant racial class" but instead as "casualties of the project of 'animality', which is historically and contemporarily part of our own condition." She argues this is an acknowledgement rather than a comparison, that "it is recognition that white supremacy’s ruthlessness isn’t limited to people of color."

== Black Vegans Rock ==
Annoyed that popular opinion was that only white people were vegans, Ko created List of 100 Black Vegans and a website, Black Vegans Rock. Huffington Post noted in 2016 that "searching the phrase "vegan people" on Google yields countless images mostly of young, smiling white people" and that the then-first image of a person of color was a photo of a hungry child captioned "When you eat meat, she doesn't eat," which framed the issue as one of wealthy white privilege. Ko intended the list and the website to "change the mainstream narrative" that veganism wasn't for Black people. In 2019 PETA said through the site Ko "has arguably done more to give black vegans a voice than any other media outlet today."

== Books ==
She is the author of Racism as Zoological Witchcraft: A Guide to Getting Out, which was described by UK Centre for Animal Law as "Establishing the connection between white supremacy and animal use, Ko urges a new form of resistance. Rather than taking an intersectional approach, where the two separate movements supposedly 'meet', Ko posits a multidimensional angle which recognises the inextricability of the ideologies from the start."

She is co-author with her sister of Aphro-ism: Essays on Pop Culture, Feminism, and Black Veganism from Two Sisters. Aphro-ism was described by Black Youth Project as "conceptualiz[ing] veganism in a way that de-centers whiteness and critiques the intersection of colonialism, race-thinking, and animality." According to Black Youth Project, "The Ko sisters argue animality is a Eurocentric concept that has contributed to the oppression of any group that deviates from the white supremacist ideal of being—white Homo sapiens."

== Personal life ==
Ko lives in Florida.

== Awards ==
- 2015 Anti-Racist Changemaker of the Year Award, Sistah Vegan Project
