= Timeline of animal welfare and rights =

Animal welfare and rights through history

This timeline describes major events in the history of animal welfare and animal rights.

== Overview ==
Period	Description
c.14000–1000 BCE	The domestication of animals began with dogs. From 8500 to 1000 BCE, cats, sheep, goats, cows, pigs, chickens, donkeys, horses, silkworms, camels, bees, ducks, and reindeer were domesticated by various civilizations.
1000 BCE–700 CE	Hinduism, Jainism, and Buddhism started teaching ahimsa, nonviolence toward all living beings. Many adherents of these religions began foregoing meat-eating and animal sacrifice, and, in the case of Jainism, taking great precautions to avoid injuring animals. The earliest known reference to the idea of non-violence to animals (pashu-ahimsa), apparently in a moral sense, has been found in the Kapisthala Katha Samhita of the Yajurveda (KapS 31.11), written about the 8th century BCE. Judaism, Christianity, and Islam began less comprehensive in their concern for animals, but included some provisions for humane treatment. A number of ancient Greek and Roman philosophers advocated for vegetarianism and kindness toward animals. The ancient Indian philosopher Thiruvalluvar (between 1st century BCE and 5th century CE) wrote an exclusive chapter on moral vegetarianism in his work Tirukkural, insisting strictly on a plant-based diet, with separate chapters on ahimsa (or non-harming) and non-killing. Vivisection for scientific and medical purposes began in ancient Greece. Under the influence of Buddhism, a ban on meat-eating was instated in Japan.
1600–1800	Enlightenment philosophers took up the question of animals and their treatment, some arguing that they were sentient beings who deserved protection. The period also saw early laws regulating cruelty to animals in places including Ireland and the Massachusetts Bay Colony.
1800–1914	British Parliament passed the first national animal protection legislation, and the first animal protection and vegetarian organizations formed in the U.S. and U.K. The American and British anti-vivisection movements grew in the late 19th century, led by Frances Power Cobbe in Britain and culminating in the Brown Dog affair, then declining sharply thereafter. The Japanese taboo against meat-eating died out under the Meiji Restoration.
1914–1966	The use of animals grew tremendously with the beginning of intensive animal agriculture in the 1920s and the increasing role of animal experimentation in science and cosmetics. Media coverage of animal abuses spurred concern over animal welfare in the U.S. and U.K., and helped bring about the first federal animal welfare legislation in the U.S. The theoretical possibility of in vitro animal products was recognized.
1966–	Consumption of intensively farmed animal products boomed worldwide, with global meat production rising from approximately 78 million tons in 1963 to 308 million tons in 2014. In the US and Europe, books, documentaries, and media coverage of controversies surrounding animal cruelty boosted the animal rights and welfare movements, while destructive direct actions by groups like the Animal Liberation Front draw public rebuke and government crackdown. Research on in vitro animal products gained traction, resulting in the first in vitro meats. Beginning in the late 1980s, Europe took the lead in animal welfare reform. In the West and some other countries, public interest in animal welfare, animal rights, and plant-based diets increased significantly.

== Detailed timeline ==
Year	Event	Country or region
c. 530 BCE	Greek philosopher Pythagoras was the first in a line of several Greek and Roman philosophers to teach that animals had souls, and to advocate for vegetarianism.	Flag of Greece
c. 269–c. 232 BCE	Indian emperor Ashoka converted to Buddhism and issued edicts advocating vegetarianism and offering protections to wild and domestic animals.	Flag of India
100s	Greek medical researcher and philosopher Galen's experiments on live animals helped establish vivisection as a widely used scientific tool.	Flag of Greece
675	Japanese Emperor Tenmu, a devout Buddhist, banned eating meat (with exceptions for fish and wild animals).	Flag of Japan
973–1057	Syrian writer and philosopher Al-Ma'arri at some point in his life stopped using any animal products, making him the first documented vegan.	Flag of Japan
Early 1600s	Philosopher and scientist René Descartes argued that animals were machines without feeling, and performed biological experiments on living animals.	Flag of France
1635	The Parliament of Ireland passed the Cruelty to Horses and Sheep Act 1634, one of the first known pieces of animal protection legislation.	Flag of Ireland
1641	Regulations against "Tirranny or Crueltie" toward domestic animals were included in the Massachusetts Body of Liberties.	Flag of the United States
1687	The Japanese ban on eating meat, which had waned with the arrival of Portuguese and Dutch missionaries, was reintroduced by the Tokugawa shogunate. Killing animals was also prohibited.	Flag of Japan
1780	In An Introduction to the Principles of Morals and Legislation philosopher Jeremy Bentham argued for better treatment of animals on the basis of their ability to feel pleasure and pain, famously writing, "The question is not, Can they reason? nor, Can they talk? but, Can they suffer?"	Flag of the United Kingdom
1809	The Liverpool Society for Preventing Wanton Cruelty to Brute Animals was founded in Liverpool on 25 October. Its programme included enforcing laws against cruelty, investigating and publicising abuses, consumer pressure against people who mistreated animals, and education. Alun Howkins and Linda Merricks describe it as the first animal-protection movement.	Flag of the United Kingdom
1822	Led by Richard Martin, British Parliament passed the Cruel Treatment of Cattle Act 1822.	Flag of the United Kingdom
1824	Richard Martin, along with Reverend Arthur Broome and abolitionist Member of Parliament William Wilberforce, founded the Society for the Prevention of Cruelty to Animals, later the Royal Society for the Prevention of Cruelty to Animals (RSPCA).	Flag of the United Kingdom
1824	Early vegan and anti-vivisectionist Lewis Gompertz published Moral Inquiries on the Situation of Man and of Brutes, one of the first books advocating for animal rights.	Flag of the United Kingdom
1830	The Association for Promoting Rational Humanity towards the Animal Creation was founded in Britain. It campaigned against cruelty through education, petitions, investigations and prosecutions, and published The Voice of Humanity.	Flag of the United Kingdom
1832s	Lewis Gompertz left the SPCA to found the Animals' Friend Society, opposing all uses of animals which were not for their benefit.	Flag of the United Kingdom
1835	Britain passed the Cruelty to Animals Act 1835 after lobbying from the Society for the Prevention of Cruelty to Animals, expanding existing legislation to protect bulls, dogs, bears, and sheep, and prohibit bear-baiting and cock-fighting.	Flag of the United Kingdom
1847	The term "vegetarian" was coined and the Vegetarian Society was founded in Britain.	Flag of the United Kingdom
1859	Charles Darwin's On the Origin of Species was published, demonstrating that humans are the evolutionary descendants of non-human animals.	Flag of the United Kingdom
1863	Frances Power Cobbe published her first article on animal rights, The Rights of Man and the Claims of Brutes, which included a moral case for the regulation of the scientific use of animals in experiments (vivisection).	
1866	The American Society for the Prevention of Cruelty to Animals was established.	Flag of the United States
1866 onwards	Under the Meiji Restoration and renewed contact with the West, the Japanese taboo against meat-eating was actively discouraged by the government. Meat-eating soon became the norm.	Flag of Japan
1875	Frances Power Cobbe founded the National Anti-Vivisection Society in Britain, the world's first anti-vivisection organization.	Flag of the United Kingdom
1876	After lobbying from anti-vivisectionists, Britain passed the Cruelty to Animals Act 1876, the first piece of national legislation to regulate animal experimentation.	Flag of the United Kingdom
1877	Anna Sewell's Black Beauty, one of the first English novels to be written from the perspective of a non-human animal, spurred concern for the welfare of horses.	Flag of the United Kingdom
1892	Social reformer Henry Stephens Salt published Animals' Rights: Considered in Relation to Social Progress, an early exposition of the philosophy of animal rights.	Flag of the United Kingdom
1902	On 19 March, the International Convention on the Protection of Birds Useful to Agriculture was signed in Paris.	Flag of France
1903	The Brown Dog affair brought anti-vivisection to the forefront of public debate in Britain; the debate lasted till 1910.	Flag of the United Kingdom
1906	J. Howard Moore published The Universal Kinship, which advocated for the ethical consideration and treatment of all sentient beings, based on Darwinian principle of shared evolutionary kinship and a universal application of the Golden Rule.	Flag of the United States
1923	Intensive animal farming began when Celia Steele raised her first flock of chickens for meat.	Flag of the United States
1933	Nazi Germany introduced the law Reichstierschutzgesetz (Reich Animal Protection Act).	Flag of Nazi Germany
1944	Donald Watson coined the word "vegan" and founded The Vegan Society in Britain.	Flag of the United Kingdom
1950	On 18 October, the International Convention on the Protection of Birds was signed in Paris.	Flag of France
Early 1950s	Willem van Eelen recognized the possibility of generating meat from tissue culture.	Flag of the Netherlands
1955	The Society for Animal Protective Legislation (SAPL), the first organization to lobby for humane slaughter legislation in the US, was founded.	Flag of the United States
1958	The American Humane Slaughter Act was passed.	Flag of the United States
1960	Indian parliament passed its first national animal welfare legislation, Prevention of Cruelty to Animals Act.	Flag of India
1964	The Hunt Saboteurs Association was founded in England to sabotage hunts and oppose bloodsports.	Flag of the United Kingdom
1964	Ruth Harrison's Animal Machines, which documented the conditions of animals on industrial farms, helped to galvanize the animal movement in Britain.	Flag of the United Kingdom
1964	Largely due to the outcry following Animal Machines, British Parliament formed the Brambell Committee to investigate animal welfare. The Committee concluded that animals should be afforded the Five Freedoms, which consisted of the animal's freedom to "have sufficient freedom of movement to be able without difficulty to turn around, groom itself, get up, lie down, [and] stretch its limbs."	Flag of the United Kingdom
1966	Following public outcry over the cases of Pepper and other mistreated animals, the American Animal Welfare Act was passed. This legislation set minimum standards for handling, sale, and transport of dogs, cats, nonhuman primates, rabbits, hamsters, and guinea pigs, and instated conservative regulations on animal experimentation.	Flag of the United States
1968	The original European Convention for the Protection of Animals during International Transport, establishing minimal ethical standards for livestock transportation in Europe, was adopted by the Council of Europe.	Flag of Europe
1970	Animal rights activist Richard Ryder coined the term "speciesism" to describe the devaluing of nonhuman animals on the basis of species alone.	Flag of the United Kingdom
1971	The United States Department of Agriculture excluded birds, mice, and rats – which make up the vast majority of animals used in research – from protection under the Animal Welfare Act.	Flag of the United States
1971	Animals, Men and Morals is published which argued explicitly in favour of animal liberation/animal rights.	Flag of the United Kingdom
1973	On 3 March, the Convention on International Trade in Endangered Species of Wild Fauna and Flora (CITES) was adopted in Washington, D.C..	Photograph of the Earth from space
1974	Ronnie Lee and Cliff Goodman of the Band of Mercy, a militant group founded by former members of the Hunt Saboteurs Association, were jailed for firebombing a British animal research center.	Flag of the United Kingdom
1974	The Council of Europe passed a directive requiring that animals be rendered unconscious before slaughter.	Flag of Europe
1974	Henry Spira founded Animal Rights International after attending a course on animal liberation given by Peter Singer.	Flag of the United States
1975	Peter Singer published Animal Liberation, whose depictions of the conditions of animals on farms and in laboratories and utilitarian arguments for animal liberation were to have a major influence on the animal movement.	Flag of the United States
1976	The European Convention for the Protection of Animals kept for Farming Purposes, which mandated that animals be kept in conditions meeting their "physiological and ethological needs", was adopted by the Council of Europe.	Flag of Europe
1976	Released from prison, Ronnie Lee founded the Animal Liberation Front in Britain, which soon spread to the US.	Flag of the United Kingdom
1976–1977	Under the leadership of Henry Spira, Animal Rights International led a successful campaign to end harmful experiments performed on cats at the American Museum of Natural History.	Flag of the United States
1979	On 10 May, the European Convention for the Protection of Animals for Slaughter, seeking 'to help harmonise methods of slaughter in Europe and make them more humane', was adopted by the Council of Europe.	Flag of Europe
1979	On 19 September, the Berne Convention on the Conservation of European Wildlife and Natural Habitats was adopted by the Council of Europe in Bern.	Flag of Europe
1979	On 20 December, the Convention for the Conservation and Management of the Vicuña was signed between Bolivia, Chile, Ecuador and Peru, in 1981 joined by Argentina, based on an earlier treaty signed on 16 August 1969 in La Paz.	Parties to the 1979 Vicuña Convention
1980	A campaign by Animal Rights International opposing Draize tests performed on rabbits by the cosmetics company Revlon resulted in Revlon making a $250,000 grant to Rockefeller University to research alternatives to animal experimentation. Several other major cosmetics companies soon followed suit.	Flag of the United States
1980	In March, Ingrid Newkirk and Alex Pacheco founded People for the Ethical Treatment of Animals (PETA).	Flag of the United States
1981–1983	The Silver Spring monkey controversy began when Alex Pacheco's undercover investigation of Edward Taub's monkey research laboratory resulted in Taub's arrest for animal cruelty. Taub was later convicted on six counts of inadequate veterinary care, which was then overturned on the grounds that state animal welfare laws did not apply to federally-funded experiments.	Flag of the United States
1982	The International Whaling Commission (IWC) banned commercial whaling by a 1982 moratorium, effective from 1986.	Photograph of the Earth from space
1983	Tom Regan published The Case for Animal Rights, a highly influential philosophical argument that animals had rights (as opposed to Peter Singer's utilitarian case for animal liberation).	Flag of the United States
1986	The European Convention for the Protection of Vertebrate Animals used for Experimental and other Scientific Purposes to regulate the treatment and protection of test animals was adopted by the Council of Europe. Simultaneously and in close coordination with the Council of Europe, Directive 86/609/EEC (later replaced by Directive 2010/63/EU) was developed and adopted by the European Communities.	Flag of Europe
1987	The European Convention for the Protection of Pet Animals promote the welfare of pets and ensure minimum standards for their treatment and protection was adopted by the Council of Europe.	Flag of Europe
1989	Gary Francione became the first academic to teach animal rights theory in an American law school, at Rutgers Law School.	Flag of the United States
1990	PETA and the Physicians Committee for Responsible Medicine ended their highly publicized legal battle over the Silver Spring monkeys, failing to gain custody of the animals.	Flag of the United States
1992	Switzerland became the first country to include protections for animals in its constitution.	Flag of Switzerland
1995	Publication of Gary Francione's Animals, Property, and the Law (1995), arguing that because animals are the property of humans, laws that supposedly require their "humane" treatment and prohibit the infliction of "unnecessary" harm do not provide a significant level of protection for animal interests.	Flag of the United States
1996	Publication of Gary Francione's Rain Without Thunder: The Ideology of the Animal Rights Movement, arguing that there are significant theoretical and practical differences between the messaging of the animal rights advocacy, which he maintains requires the abolition of animal exploitation, and the messaging of animal welfare advocates, which seeks to regulate exploitation to continue the exploitation while making it (appear as) less painful and more humane (as in laboratory IACUCs and regulated cattle ranching).	Flag of the United States
1997	The European Union's Protocol on Animal Protection was annexed to the treaty establishing the European Community. The Protocol recognized animals as "sentient beings" (rather than mere property) and required countries to pay "full regard to the welfare requirements of animals" when making laws regarding their use.	Flag of Europe
1998	The EU passed the Council Directive 98/58/EC Concerning the Protection of Animals Kept for Farming Purposes, which was based on a revised Five Freedoms: freedom from hunger and thirst; from discomfort; from pain, injury, and disease; from fear and distress; and to express normal behavior.	Flag of Europe
1999	Willem van Eelen secured the first patent for in vitro meat.	Flag of the Netherlands
1999	European Union Council Directive 1999/74/EC was legislation passed by the European Union on the minimum standards for keeping egg laying hens which effectively banned conventional battery cages.	Flag of Europe
2000–2009	Bans on fur farming were instituted in the United Kingdom, Austria, Netherlands, Switzerland, Croatia, and Bosnia and Herzegovina.	Flag of Europe
2001	The European Court of Justice issued a conservative interpretation of the 1997 Protocol on Animal Protection in the Jippes case, stating that the law did not create new protections for animals but only codified existing ones.	Flag of Europe
2003	The revised European Convention for the Protection of Animals during International Transport, establishing more detailed ethical standards for livestock transportation in Europe than the original 1968 convention, was adopted by the Council of Europe.	Flag of Europe
2006	Veal crates became illegal in the EU.	Flag of Europe
2008	Spain passed a non-legislative measure to grant non-human primates the right to life, liberty, and freedom from use in experiments. However, this required further action by the government to become formal law, which was not taken.	Flag of Spain
2008	California passed a ballot measure requiring that a chicken "be able to extend its limbs fully and turn around freely". This has been described as a ban on battery cages, but battery cages giving 116 square inches per hen were allowed under the law.	Flag of the United States
2009	In 2009, Bolivia became the first country to ban all animal use in circuses.	Flag of Bolivia
2009	After a similar 1991 ban in the Canary Islands, the Catalan Parliament adopted a ban on bullfighting in Catalonia in December 2009, effective January 2012. However, it was overturned by the Spanish Constitutional Court in October 2016.	Flag of Spain
2010	Gary Yourofsky's YouTube lecture on veganism and factory farming entitled "Best Speech You Will Ever Hear" was translated into Hebrew, and went viral in Israel. The speech helped drive a surge in Israeli interest in veganism and animal rights.	Flag of Israel
2010	EU Directive 2010/63/EU was the EU legislation "on the protection of animals used for scientific purposes" and became one of the most stringent ethical and welfare standards worldwide.	Flag of Europe
2011–2016	After undercover investigations sparked public outrage over animal abuse on industrial farms, several American states introduced "ag-gag" laws in an effort to criminalize such investigations.	Flag of the United States
2012	The EU's ban on battery cages went into effect. Furnished cages were still allowed, however.	Flag of Europe
2012	A group of prominent scientists issued the Cambridge Declaration on Consciousness, which stated that "the weight of evidence indicates that humans are not unique in possessing the neurological substrates that generate consciousness. Nonhuman animals, including all mammals and birds, and many other creatures, including insects and octopuses, also possess these neurological substrates."	Flag of the United Kingdom
2013	The world's first cultured meat product (a hamburger), developed by the Maastricht University team of Mark Post (mostly sponsored by Sergey Brin), was publicly tested by Hanni Rützler in London.	Photograph of the Earth from space
2013	The EU banned testing cosmetics on animals.	Flag of Europe
2013	The Nonhuman Rights Project filed the first-ever lawsuits on behalf of chimpanzees, demanding courts grant them the right to bodily liberty via a writ of habeas corpus. The petitions were denied and the cases moved on to appellate courts.	Flag of the United States
2013	The UK legislation to protect animals in research, The Animals (Scientific Procedures) Act 1986, was amended to protect "...all living vertebrates, other than man, and any living cephalopod." Previously, the only protected invertebrate was the common octopus.	Flag of the United Kingdom
2014	The American Animal Cruelty Investigations School was established in the United States with the mission to provide law enforcement and animal care and control professionals training in the area of animal cruelty investigations.	Flag of the United States
2014	India became the first country in Asia to ban testing cosmetics on animals as well as imports of animal-tested cosmetics.	Flag of India
2015	In a survey of Israelis, 8% of respondents identified as vegetarian and 5% as vegan (up from 2.5% vegetarians in 2010), making Israel the country with the highest percentage of vegans.	Flag of Israel
2015	New Zealand passes the Animal Welfare Amendment Bill, stating animals like humans are sentient beings.	Flag of New Zealand
2015–2016	Following major public backlash prompted by the 2013 film Blackfish, SeaWorld announced it would end its controversial orca shows and breeding program.	Flag of the United States
2015–2016	In the U.S., a number of major egg buyers and producers switched from battery-cage to cage-free eggs.	Flag of the United States
2016	Cellular agriculture company Memphis Meats announced the creation of the first in vitro meatball.	Flag of the United States
2018	On December 20, 2018, the federal Dog and Cat Meat Trade Prohibition Act was signed into law as part of the 2018 Farm Bill, making it illegal to slaughter a dog or cat for food in the United States, with exceptions for ritual slaughter.	Flag of the United States
2019	A proposal to ban factory farming in Switzerland achieved 100,000 signatures, forcing a nationwide ballot on the issue.	Flag of Switzerland
2019	On June 13, 2019, the Federal Administrative Court in Leipzig, Germany, ruled that the current way of killing unwanted chicks "violates the country's laws against killing animals without a justifiable reason."	Flag of Germany
2019	On October 12, 2019, California banned the sale and manufacture of most animal fur, with some exceptions such as for cowhide or religious observances, effective January 1, 2023.	Flag of the United States
2020	In January 2020, an employment tribunal in Britain ruled that ethical veganism is a "philosophical belief" and therefore is protected in law. This was the first time an employment tribunal in Britain ruled this. This was in regards to vegan Jordi Casamitjana, who stated he was fired by the League Against Cruel Sports due to his ethical veganism.	Flag of the United Kingdom
2020	On July 2, 2020, a referendum launched on improving legislation for animals in France, organized through the collaboration of 25 French animal rights and welfare organizations, including L214 and CIWF.	Flag of France
2020	In December 2020, the first cultured meat product in the world entered the market after being approved by the Singapore Food Agency.	Flag of Singapore
2020	In December 2020, the European Court of Justice ruled that member states of the European Union may require a reversible pre-cut stunning procedure during ritual slaughter in order to promote animal welfare.	Flag of Europe
2021	The UK passed legislation formally recognizing animals as sentient beings.	Flag of the United Kingdom
2021	In a US court, animals were recognized as "interested persons" for the first time.	Flag of the United States
2021	Octopuses, crabs and lobsters were recognized under UK law as sentient beings.	Flag of the United Kingdom
2021	In December 2021, Spain approved a law recognizing animals as sentient beings.	Flag of Spain
2022	Per 1 January 2022, Germany and France jointly became the first countries in the world to prohibit all chick culling, as they called on other EU member states to do the same.	Flag of France and Germany
2022	In February 2022, the electorate in Basel-Stadt in northern Switzerland got to vote on enshrining the basic rights of all non-human primates in the cantonal constitution. While the ballot initiative fell through, it was the first time in history that such a vote had taken place.	Flag of Switzerland

== See also ==
- Abolitionism (animal rights)
- Animal welfare and rights in China
- Animal welfare and rights in India
- Animal welfare in the United States
- History of vegetarianism
- List of animal rights advocates
- Speciesism
- Timeline of animal welfare and rights in Europe
- Timeline of animal welfare and rights in the United States
- Timeline of cellular agriculture
- Universal Declaration on Animal Welfare
- Veganism
- Women and animal advocacy
