= Timeline of animal welfare and rights in Europe =

This page is a timeline of the major events in the history of animal welfare and rights in Europe.

== Big picture ==
Period	Description
600 BCE – 200	In ancient Greece and Rome, a number of philosophers advocate for vegetarianism and kindness towards animals, while the use of vivisection – operations on live animals – as a scientific tool spreads.
1600–1800	Philosophers take up the question of animals and their treatment, with some arguing that they are sentient beings who deserve protection. The first known modern animal protection law is passed in Ireland.
1800–1870	The first national animal welfare law is enacted in the United Kingdom, followed by laws in Germany, Switzerland, France, and Sweden. These laws are largely concerned with public mistreatment of animals as a violation of decency, rather than the suffering of the animals themselves. The first animal protection society is founded in the UK, followed by organizations in Germany and Switzerland.
1870–1914	The anti-vivisection movement takes hold in the UK, where the first legislation to regulate animal experimentation is passed. European anti-vivisectionists and moderate animal protectionists clash, with little significant legislation on animal experimentation appearing outside England, and interest in anti-vivisection waning by World War I. Animal protection societies in Scandinavia and Germany push for humane slaughter regulations. European animal protection societies begin to shift from opposing animal cruelty as a harm to property and public morals, to opposing animal cruelty as a harm to the animal itself.
1914–1970	The number of European countries with national animal welfare laws grows. The number of animals raised and killed for food increases dramatically with the advent of intensive animal agriculture The number of animal used in research also increases significantly with the growth of scientific and medical research.
1970–2016	Meat consumption continues to rise. Countries continue to enact legislation regulating the use and treatment of animals in agriculture and science, with several recognizing animals as sentient beings deserving of basic protections. A number of international agreements are adopted, culminating in measures by the European Union (EU) to recognize animals as sentient beings whose basic needs should be provided for; ban battery cages, veal crates, and gestation crates; and to regulate and monitor animal agriculture and experimentation in various other ways.

== Full timeline ==
Year	Event	Location
c. 530 BCE	Greek philosopher Pythagoras is the first in a line of several Greek and Roman philosophers to teach that animals have souls and advocate for vegetarianism.	Ancient Greece
100s	Greek medical researcher and philosopher Galen's experiments on live animals help establish vivisection as a widely used scientific tool.	Rome
Early 1600s	Philosopher and scientist René Descartes argues that animals are machines without feeling, and performs biological experiments on living animals.	Netherlands
1635	The Parliament of Ireland passes the Cruelty to Horses and Sheep Act 1634, one of the first known pieces of animal protection legislation.	Ireland
1751	William Hogarth paints The Four Stages of Cruelty, which depicts children committing cruelty against animals progressing into adults who commit cruelty against other humans.	England
1754	Philosopher Jean-Jacques Rousseau argues against the mistreatment of animals on the grounds that they are "sensitive beings" and advocates for vegetarianism.	Geneva
1764	Philosopher Voltaire writes Beasts, a short essay denouncing the mechanistic view of animals.	France
1780	In An Introduction to the Principles of Morals and Legislation philosopher Jeremy Bentham argues for better treatment of animals on the basis of their ability to feel pleasure and pain, famously writing, "The question is not, Can they reason? nor, Can they talk? but, Can they suffer?".	England
1785	Philosopher Immanuel Kant argues that animals are not ends-in-themselves, but that in abusing animals we fail in our duties to other people by damaging our humanity.	Prussia
1822	Led by Richard Martin, the British Parliament passes the Cruel Treatment of Cattle Act 1822.	United Kingdom
1824	Richard Martin, along with Reverend Arthur Broome and abolitionist Member of Parliament William Wilberforce, founds the Society for the Prevention of Cruelty to Animals (now the Royal Society for the Prevention of Cruelty to Animals), the world's first animal protection organization.	United Kingdom
1830s	Early vegan and anti-vivisectionist Lewis Gompertz leaves the SPCA to found the Animals' Friend Society, opposing all uses of animals which are not for their benefit.	England
1835	After many similar bills had failed over the previous three decades, the British Parliament passes its Cruelty to Animals Act 1835, outlawing blood sports.	United Kingdom
1837	The first German animal protection society is founded.	Stuttgart
1838	The Kingdom of Saxony enacts the first law against animal cruelty in Germany.	Saxony
1842	The Swiss Canton of Schaffhausen introduces the first law against animal cruelty in Switzerland.	Schaffhausen
1844	The first Swiss animal protection society is founded.	Bern
1847	The term "vegetarian" is coined and the British Vegetarian Society is founded.	England
1850	France passes law criminalizing the public mistreatment of animals.	France
1857	Sweden enacts its Criminal Law, which includes statutes against animal cruelty. Unlike most contemporary European penal statutes, the Swedish law penalizes cruelty towards an animal regardless of its property aspects.	Sweden
1859	Charles Darwin's On the Origin of Species is published, demonstrating that humans are the evolutionary descendants of non-human animals.	England
1870s onward	European animal protection advocates begin to focus less on animal cruelty as a harm to property and public morals, and more on animal cruelty as a harm to the animal itself. For instance, Germany's Animal Protection Society calls for the expansion of laws so that "the animal itself be protected and not only out of regard for the public".	
By 1871	All German states except Lübeck have regulations against animal cruelty.	Germany
1875	Frances Power Cobbe founds the British National Anti-Vivisection Society, the world's first anti-vivisection organization.	England
1876	After lobbying from anti-vivisectionists, the UK passes the Cruelty to Animals Act 1876, the first piece of national legislation to regulate animal experimentation.	United Kingdom
1877	Anna Sewell's Black Beauty, the first English novel to be written from the perspective of a non-human animal, spurs concern for the welfare of horses. Although the book is now considered a children's classic, Sewell originally wrote it for those who worked with horses. She said "a special aim was to induce kindness, sympathy, and an understanding treatment of horses". In many respects the book can be read as a guide to horse husbandry, stable management and humane training practices for colts. It is considered to have had an effect on reducing cruelty to horses; for example, the use of bearing reins, which are particularly painful for a horse, was one of the practices highlighted in the novel, and in the years after the book's release the reins became less popular and fell out of favor.	England
1877	Spain passes its first anti-cruelty provision, which prohibits the maltreatment of dogs.	Spain
1878–1879	Responding to the moderate positions taken by the German animal protection organizations on animal experimentation, Marie Espérance von Schwartz, Ernst Georg Friedrich Grysanowski, and Ernst von Weber begin to form a dedicated anti-vivisection movement in Germany. Von Weber distributes a highly successful pamphlet, winning the support of Richard Wagner.	Germany
1879	Anti-vivisectionists clash with moderate animal protectionists at the German Animal Protection Congress, leading von Weber and von Schwartz to found the International Society for Combat Against Scientific Torture of Animals, which receives financial support from Wagner.	Germany
Early 1880s	Political debates on the regulation of animal experimentation take place in Germany, resulting in a government inquiry into the need for regulation. A significant majority of German animal protection societies oppose the abolition of vivisection.	Germany
1882	The Swedish Nordic Association (now Djurens Rätt, or Animal Rights) is founded to oppose cruelty to animals in science.	Sweden
1886	The Germany Society for the Protection of Animals petitions the Reichstag to regulate slaughterhouses, initiating a national debate over slaughter regulation in Germany. By this time there are already nearly 100 public slaughterhouses controlled by local ordinances, including those against unnecessary cruelty.	Germany
Late 1880s-early 1890s	German anti-vivisectionists fail to achieve national regulations on animal experimentation, and interest in anti-vivisection wanes.	Germany
1891	Danish, Norwegian, and Swedish animal protection societies publish an appeal for humane slaughter.	Denmark, Norway, and Sweden
1892	Social reformer Henry Salt publishes Animals' Rights: Considered in Relation to Social Progress, an early exposition of the philosophy of animal rights.	England
1903–1910	The Brown Dog affair brings anti-vivisection to the forefront of public debate in the UK.	England
1928	The Criminal Code of 1928 is the first Spanish law to incriminate abuse of domestic animals in general.	Spain
1944	Donald Watson coins the word "vegan" and founds The Vegan Society in the UK.	England
1950	Denmark passes its Animal Protection Law.	Denmark
Early 1950s	Willem van Eelen recognizes the possibility of generating meat from tissue culture.	Netherlands
1950s	Intensive animal farming begins in the UK, driving a massive increase in the number of animals raised and slaughtered for food.	
1959	France issues decree incriminating the maltreatment of domestic or captive animals.	France
1961	Netherlands passes its Animal Protection Act.	Netherlands
1964	The Hunt Saboteurs Association is founded to sabotage hunts and oppose bloodsports.	England
1964	Ruth Harrison's Animal Machines, which documents the conditions of animals on industrial farms, helps to galvanize the animal movement.	United Kingdom
1964	Largely due to the outcry following Animal Machines, British Parliament forms the Brambell Committee to investigate animal welfare. The Committee concludes that animals should be afforded the Five Freedoms, which consist of the animal's freedom to "have sufficient freedom of movement to be able without difficulty to turn around, groom itself, get up, lie down, [and] stretch its limbs."	United Kingdom
1969	The Council of Europe adopts the Convention on Animals in Transport.	
1970	Animal rights activist Richard Ryder coins the term "speciesism" to describe the devaluing of nonhuman animals on the basis of species alone.	England
1972	Germany passes its Animal Protection Act.	Germany
1974	Ronnie Lee and Cliff Goodman of the Band of Mercy, a militant group founded by former members of the Hunt Saboteurs Association, are jailed for firebombing a British animal research center.	England
1974	The Council of Europe passes a directive requiring that animals be rendered unconscious before slaughter.	
1975	Spain's first animal welfare organization, the Association for the Defense of Animal Rights, is founded.	Spain
1976	The European Convention for the Protection of Animals Kept for Farming Purposes, which mandates that animals be kept in conditions meeting their "physiological and ethological needs", is passed.	
1976	Released from prison, Ronnie Lee founds the Animal Liberation Front, which soon spreads to the US and Europe.	England
1976	France passes animal welfare law which recognizes that (domestic) animals are sentient beings, and requires that alternatives to animal experimentation be used where possible.	France
1977	The Dutch Experiments on Animals Act is passed.	
1977	The Lega Antivivisezione Italiana (Italian Antivivisection League) – "arguably the most successful animal rights group in Italy" – is founded.	Italy
1978	The Swiss Animal Welfare Act is passed.	Switzerland
1979	The first European Conference on Farm Animal Welfare is held.	Netherlands
1986	The Council of Europe issues the European Directive Regarding the Protection of Animals Used for Experimental and Other Scientific Purposes.	
1988	The Swedish Animal Welfare Act is passed.	Sweden
1992	Switzerland becomes the first country to include protections for animals in its constitution.	Switzerland
1997	The EU's Protocol on Animal Protection is annexed to the treaty establishing the European Community. The Protocol recognizes animals as "sentient beings" (rather than mere property) and requires countries to pay "full regard to the welfare requirements of animals" when making laws regarding their use.	
1998	The EU passes the Council Directive 98/58/EC Concerning the Protection of Animals Kept for Farming Purposes, which is based on a revised Five Freedoms: freedom from hunger and thirst; from discomfort; from pain, injury, and disease; from fear and distress; and to express normal behavior.	
1999	The EU passes a law phasing out the use of barren battery cages.	
1999	Willem van Eelen secures the first patent for in vitro meat.	
2000	The Fur Farming (Prohibition) Act 2000 is enacted by the British Parliament, outlawing fur farming in England and Wales.	England and Wales
2001	The European Court of Justice issues a conservative interpretation of the 1997 Protocol on Animal Protection in the Jippes case, stating that the law did not create new protections for animals but only codified existing ones.	
2002	The Fur Farming (Prohibition) (Scotland) Act 2002 is enacted by the Scottish Parliament, outlawing fur farming in Scotland.	Scotland
2002	Germany extends constitutional protection to animals.	Germany
2003	EU bans the construction of new gestation crates.	
2004	Austria's Animal Welfare Act is passed following a campaign by animal rights groups. The law bans all battery cages effective 2009, makes it illegal to kill any animal without reason, and enacts a federal bans on fur farming and the use of wild animals in circuses.	Austria
2004	England amends its Criminal Justice and Police Act of 2001 to give police more power to stop animal activist tactics such as intimidating demonstrations.	England
2005	French government resists EU ban on animal cosmetics testing, taking its case to the European Court of Justice, where it is rejected.	France
2005	The Council of Europe adopts a recommendation on the welfare of farmed fish.	
2006	The European Commission passes minimum requirements on the collection of information during inspection of animal farms so that the European Community can evaluate the impact of its welfare policies.	
2006	Veal crates become illegal in the EU.	
2006	The Animal Welfare Act in England and Wales and the Animal Health and Welfare Act in Scotland provide minimum standards for keeping domesticated and captive animals.	England, Wales, and Scotland
2008	A crackdown by the Austrian government targets nonviolent activists responsible for recent reforms, imprisoning ten leaders of nonviolent animal welfare organizations (including Martin Balluch of the Association Against Animal Factories). Balluch is released under no charge or evidence of illegal activity after 100 days.	Austria
2008	All fox fur farming in the Netherlands ceases.	Netherlands
2008	Spain passes a non-legislative measure to grant non-human primates the right to life, liberty, and freedom from use in experiments. However, this requires further action by the government to become formal law, which has not been taken.	Spain
2011	The Welfare of Animals Act (Northern Ireland) 2011 is enacted.	Northern Ireland
2012	The EU's ban on battery cages goes into effect.	
2012	A group of prominent scientists issue the Cambridge Declaration on Consciousness, which states that "the weight of evidence indicates that humans are not unique in possessing the neurological substrates that generate consciousness. Nonhuman animals, including all mammals and birds, and many other creatures, including octopuses, also possess these neurological substrates."	Cambridge, England
2013	The EU ban on all gestation crates goes into effect.	
2013	Spain passes legislation protecting bullfighting and running of the bulls.	Spain
2015	Pope Francis' encyclical Laudato si' calls for better treatment of animals, and notes that animal testing is only permissible "if it remains within reasonable limits [and] contributes to caring for or saving human lives".	Vatican City
2019	Proposal to ban factory farming in Switzerland achieves 100,000 signatures, forcing a nationwide ballot on the issue.	Switzerland

== See also ==
- Timeline of animal welfare and rights
- Timeline of animal welfare and rights in the United States
- History of vegetarianism
- List of animal rights advocates
- Animal welfare in the United States
- Animal welfare and rights in India
- Animal welfare and rights in China
- Animal consciousness
- Speciesism
