= Timeline of animal welfare and rights in the United States =

This page is a timeline of the major events in the history of animal welfare and rights in the United States.

== Big picture ==
Period	Descriptions
c.13000 BCE-1492	Native Americans in the present-day United States use domesticated dogs and turkeys.
1493-1800	European settlers introduce a number of domesticated species to the Americas. Settlers adopt the first known animal welfare laws in North America.
1800-1914	The first American state anti-cruelty laws and animal protection organizations appear. Anti-vivisection organizations form but do not result in any major regulations on animal experimentation.
1914-1966	By World War I, the American anti-vivisection movement has come to a standstill. Intensive animal farming begins in the 1920s and accelerates with technological advances in the 1940s, allowing American meat consumption to grow from 9.8 billion pounds in 1909 to approximately 32 billion pounds in 1970. Scientific and cosmetic testing on animals also accelerates dramatically. Concern for animal welfare resurges in the 1950s, resulting in the federal Humane Slaughter Act and the Animal Welfare Act.
1966-2016	Intensive animal agriculture continues to grow, with the number of land animals slaughtered for food in the U.S. growing from 2.4 billion in 1965 to 9.2 billion in 2015. Books, documentaries, and media coverage of controversies surrounding animal cruelty boost the animal rights and welfare movements, while destructive direct actions by groups like the Animal Liberation Front draw public rebuke and government crackdown. Research on in vitro animal products gains traction, resulting in the first in vitro meats. Public interest in animal welfare, animal rights, and plant-based diets increases significantly, though the number of Americans practicing vegetarian and vegan diets does not seem to increase significantly in the first decade of the 2000s. Several states ban the intensive confinement of sows, veal calves, and chickens.

== Timeline ==
Year	Event
c.13000 BCE	Domestic dogs arrive in North America with Siberian colonizers. Native Americans use dogs as draught animals, and breed them for wool and food.
c.200 BCE	Native Americans in the present-day southwestern US domesticate turkeys, initially using them for feathers and later for food.
1493 onward	European settlers introduce domesticated cows, pigs, sheep, chickens, goats, and horses to the Americas.
1641	The first known animal welfare statutes in North America - regulations against “Tirranny or Crueltie” toward domestic animals - are included in the Massachusetts Body of Liberties.
1828	New York passes the first state law against animal cruelty.
1830s onward	Newspapers carry articles reporting and denouncing cruelty towards animals.
1835	Massachusetts passes its first state law against animal cruelty, the second in the nation.
1866	Henry Bergh founds the American Society for the Prevention of Cruelty to Animals (ASPCA), the first animal protection organization in the US, after visiting Britain's Royal Society for the Prevention of Cruelty to Animals.
1868	George Angell founds the Massachusetts Society for the Prevention of Cruelty and succeeds in having a law passed to prevent cruelty towards animals in Massachusetts.
1882	As part of his humane education campaign George Angell begins to organize "Bands of Mercy" to encourage people to learn about and help animals.
1883	Caroline Earle White founds the American Anti-Vivisection Society (AAVS), the first anti-vivisection organization in the US.
1880-1900	The American anti-vivisection movement fails to take hold as it did in Britain, which passed the first national regulations on animal experimentation in 1876. No significant regulations on animal experimentation are passed in the US during this period.
1889	George Angell founds the American Humane Education Society.
1907	Every state in the union has anti-cruelty statutes.
1910	Massachusetts passes a law to allow the Massachusetts SPCA to inspect slaughterhouses.
1922	By this time, twenty states have passed laws requiring humane education in schools.
1923	Intensive animal farming begins when Celia Steele raises her first flock of chickens for meat.
1940s	Industrial animal farming grows due to a number of innovations, including the discovery of vitamin A and vitamin D, which allow chickens to be kept inside without sunlight or exercise; de-beaking machines, which makes it easier to remove the beaks of chickens so that they can be kept in close quarters without pecking one another; hybrid feeds so animals put on weight faster; mechanized feather pluckers; and antibiotic food additives.
1944	Public Health Service Act contributes to a significant increase in animal experimentation over the following decades.
1955	The Society for Animal Protective Legislation (SAPL), the first organization to lobby for humane slaughter legislation in the US, is founded.
1958	The Humane Slaughter Act - the United States' first federal animal welfare legislation - is passed.
1966	Following public outcry over the cases of Pepper and other mistreated animals, the American Animal Welfare Act (AWA) is passed. This legislation sets minimum standards for handling, sale, and transport of dogs, cats, nonhuman primates, rabbits, hamsters, and guinea pigs, and instates conservative regulations on animal experimentation.
1970	The AWA is amended to cover all warm-blooded laboratory animals, and intra- in addition to interstate animal transport. It also requires the appropriate use of anesthetics during experiments.
1971	The United States Department of Agriculture excludes birds, mice, and rats - which make up the vast majority of animals used in research - from protection under the Animal Welfare Act.
1974	Henry Spira founds Animal Rights International after attending a course on animal liberation given by Peter Singer.
1975	Peter Singer publishes Animal Liberation, whose depictions of the conditions of animals on farms and in laboratories and utilitarian arguments for animal liberation are to have a major influence on the animal movement.
1976	The militant underground animal rights group Animal Liberation Front (ALF) is founded in Britain and quickly spreads to the US.
1976	An amendment to the AWA outlaws the interstate or foreign transport of animals used in fighting and establishes standards for shipping containers, feed, water, rest, ventilation, temperature, and handling during transport.
1976-1977	Under the leadership of Henry Spira, Animal Rights International leads a successful campaign to end harmful experiments performed on cats at the American Museum of Natural History.
1979	The National Association of Biomedical Research is founded to advocate for the continued use of animals in biomedical research.
1980	A campaign by Animal Rights International opposing Draize tests performed on rabbits by the cosmetics company Revlon results in Revlon making a $250,000 grant to Rockefeller University to research alternatives to animal experimentation. Several other major cosmetics companies soon follow suit.
1980	Ingrid Newkirk and Alex Pacheco found People for the Ethical Treatment of Animals (PETA).
1981	Vegetarian activist Alex Hershaft organizes the first Action for Life conference, which is attended by a number of pioneers in the animal rights movement, including Ingrid Newkirk, Alex Pacheco, George Cave, Richard Morgan, Doug Moss, Jim Mason, and Henry Spira. Cave founds Trans-Species Unlimited, Morgan founds Mobilization for Animals, Moss and Mason start the Animal Rights Network, and Hershaft's Vegetarian Information Service becomes the Farm Animal Rights Movement (FARM).
1981-1983	The Silver Spring monkey controversy begins when Alex Pacheco's undercover investigation of Edward Taub's monkey research laboratory results in Taub's arrest for animal cruelty. Taub is convicted on six counts of inadequate veterinary care. In a second trial, he is acquitted of five of the six convictions, and in appeals court this final conviction is overturned.
1982	FARM's Veal Ban campaign publicizes the conditions of veal calves. In protest of veal calves' treatment, FARM's Hershaft spends 24 hours outside of the White House in a veal crate.
1983	The first World Day for Laboratory Animals is held on April 24. The first World Day for Farmed Animals is held on October 2, the birthday of Mahatma Gandhi.
1984	Tom Regan publishes The Case for Animal Rights, a highly influential philosophical argument that animals have rights (as opposed to Peter Singer's utilitarian case for animal liberation).
1984	In a raid of researcher Thomas Gennarelli's lab at the University of Pennsylvania, the ALF obtains footage of experiments in which researchers inflicted brain damage on baboons with a hydraulic press. PETA makes the footage into a documentary about the experiments entitled Unnecessary Fuss, taken from Gennarelli's remark that concern over the experiments was "unnecessary fuss".
1985	After failing to get Gennarelli's lab defunded through appeals to the United States Department of Health and Human Services (HHS) and Congress, 100 PETA protesters occupy the offices of the NIH office which was responsible for funding the lab. On the fourth day of the protest, the director of the HHS suspends funds to Gennarelli's lab until an investigation is completed. The affair is covered by a number of major news outlets.
1985	Amid the Silver Spring monkey affair, the Improved Standards for Laboratory Animals Act as an amendment to the Food Security Act of 1985. This amendment expands the scope of USDA's jurisdiction over animal testing, animals in higher education, animals on exhibit and captive marine animals. It provides for the psychological well-being of dogs and primates. The amendment also establishes Institutional Animal Care and Use Committees (IACUCs) to oversee animal care and ensure that alternatives to animal use be explored at research institutions.
1987	With public concern for veal calf welfare rising, largely due to the activities of animal welfare and rights groups, the Veal Calf Protection Act is introduced in Congress. It eventually dies.
1990	PETA and the Physicians Committee for Responsible Medicine end their highly publicized legal battle over the Silver Spring monkeys, failing to gain custody of the animals. By the end of 1990, 8 of the 17 monkeys survive.
1990	The AWA is amended to require that all dogs and cats be held at shelters for at least 5 days before they are allowed to be sold to research facilities, in order to allow pets to be claimed or adopted and ensure that animals are obtained legally.
1992	The Animal Enterprise Protection Act (AEPA) is passed. This law creates the crime of "animal enterprise terrorism" for those who damage or cause the loss of property of an animal enterprise.
2002	The AWA is amended to redefine the term "animal" in the law to match the USDA regulations, i.e. to exclude birds, mice, and rats.
2002	Florida becomes the first state to ban gestation crates.
2006	The Animal Enterprise Terrorism Act (AETA) is passed. The AETA expands the 1992 AEPA to classify as a terrorist anyone who damages the property of an animal enterprise or of a person or entity connected to an animal enterprise, or creates a "reasonable fear" of injury.
2006	Arizona passes a ballot measure banning veal and gestation crates, becoming the first state to ban veal crates.
2007	Oregon passes legislation banning gestation crates.
2008	Colorado passes legislation banning gestation crates and veal crates.
2008	California passes a ballot measure requiring that a chicken "be able to extend its limbs fully and turn around freely". This has been described as a ban on battery cages, but battery cages giving 116 square inches per hen are allowed under the law.
2009	Maine and Michigan pass legislation banning gestation and veal crates.
2011-2016	After undercover investigations spark public outrage over animal abuse on industrial farms, several American states introduce "ag-gag" laws in an effort to criminalize such investigations.
2013	The Nonhuman Rights Project files the first-ever lawsuits on behalf of chimpanzees, demanding courts grant them the right to bodily liberty via a writ of habeas corpus. The petitions are denied and the cases move on to appellate courts.
2015-2016	Following major public backlash prompted by the 2013 film Blackfish, SeaWorld announces it will end its controversial orca shows and breeding program.
2015-2016	In the U.S., a number of major egg buyers and producers switch from battery-cage to cage-free eggs.
2016	Cellular agriculture company Memphis Meats announces the creation of the first in vitro meatball.
2018	The PAWS Act becomes law in the United States, and it expands the definition of stalking to include "conduct that causes a person to experience a reasonable fear of death or serious bodily injury to his or her pet”. It also declares that restitution in domestic abuse cases must include veterinary costs for survivors, if applicable, and establishes a $3 million federal grant program to help survivors of domestic violence find shelters for their pets.
2022	A Utah court acquits activists Wayne Hsiung and Paul Picklesimer for carrying out an open rescue of two piglets at a factory farm. They were at risk of dying from the surrounding conditions before they could be slaughtered for meat.

== See also ==
- Timeline of animal welfare and rights
- Timeline of animal welfare and rights in Europe
- Animal welfare in the United States
- Animal welfare and rights in China
- Animal welfare and rights in India
- Animal rights movement
- Universal Declaration on Animal Welfare
