= Animal welfare in the United States =

Treatment of and laws concerning non-human animals in the US

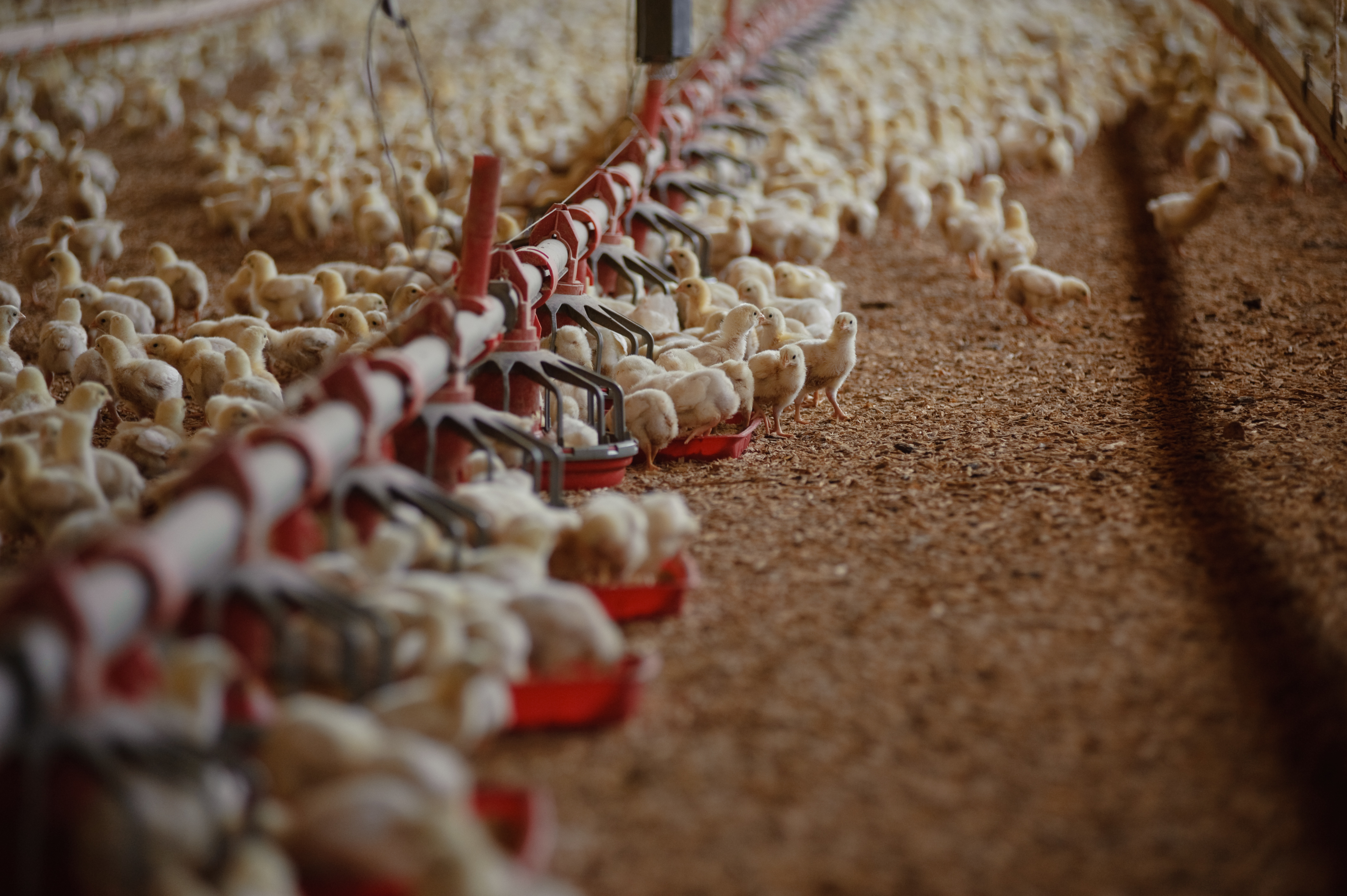
- Baby chickens in a broiler house in Texas
- Legislation: Animal Welfare Act of 1966

Number of animals slaughtered annually for meat production
- Total: 9.94 billion (2022)
- Per capita: 29.39 (2022)

Proportion of population that does not eat meat
- Vegetarian: 4% (2023)
- Vegan: 1% (2023)

Animal welfare in the United States relates to the treatment of non-human animals in fields such as agriculture, hunting, medical testing and the domestic ownership of animals. It is distinct from animal conservation.

== History ==
=== 1641–1900 ===
The first known animal welfare laws in North America were regulations against "Tirranny or Crueltie" toward domestic animals included in the 1641 Massachusetts Body of Liberties.

Starting in the late 1820s, a number of states passed anti-cruelty statutes. Many of these exempted animals used in experiments, and only twice were they invoked on behalf of animals. The first Humane Societies and Societies for the Protection of Animals (SPCAs) were formed starting in the late 1860s to run animal shelters and promote the enforcement of animal cruelty laws.

The American anti-vivisection movement began in response to the opening of the first animal laboratories in the 1860s and 70s. The American Anti-Vivisection Society was formed in Philadelphia in 1883. The anti-vivisection movement failed to achieve federal regulations on animal experimentation and declined as medical science advanced.

=== 1900–present ===
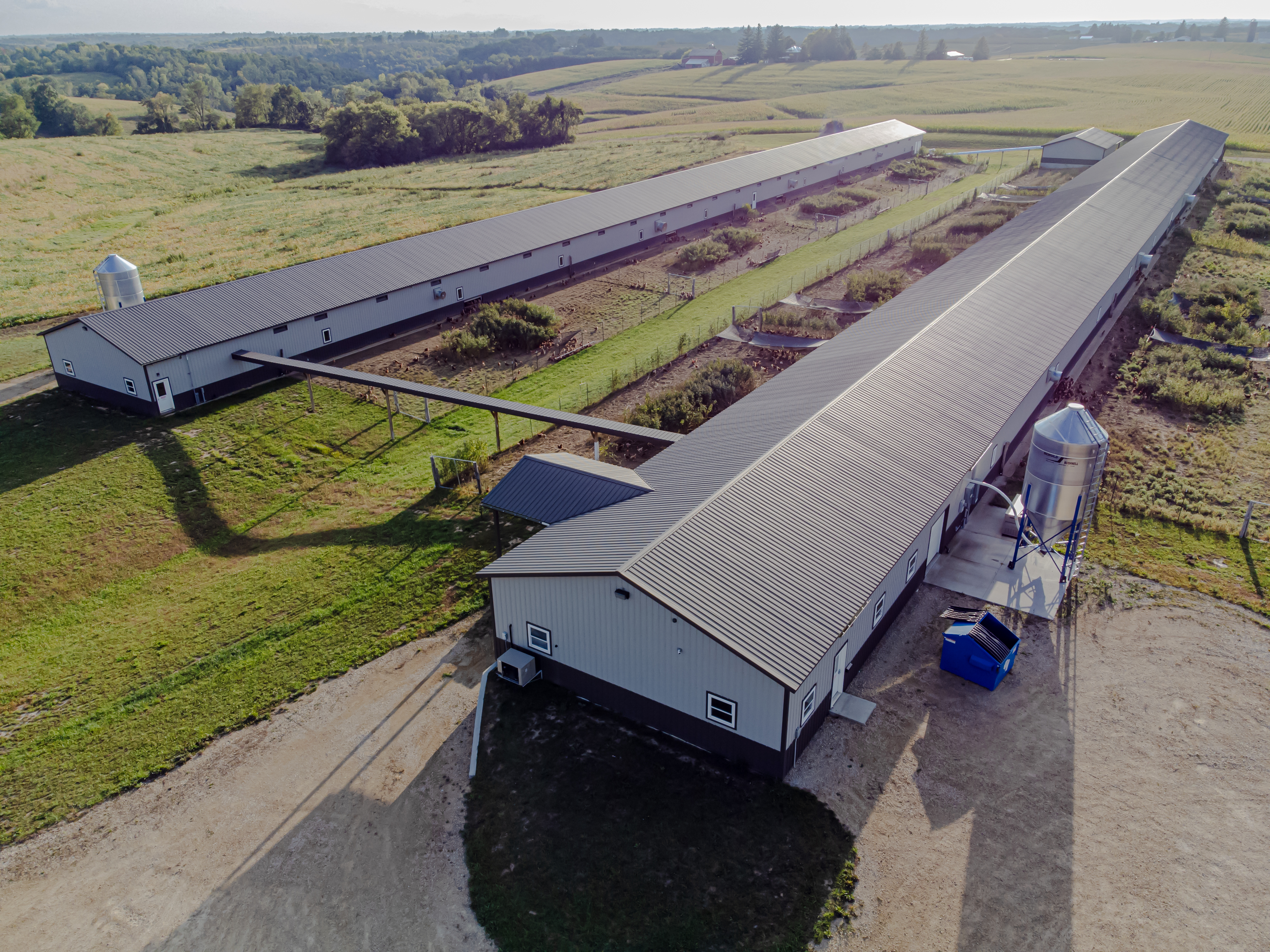
A yarding poultry farm in Vernon County, Wisconsin.

The beginning of intensive animal farming is traceable to 1923 in the Delmarva Peninsula, where Celia Steele raised her first flock of chickens for meat. Starting in the 1940s, intensive confinement and genetic selection of chickens for characteristics like growth rate, weight, and feed conversion efficiency allowed farmers to obtain chicken meat much more efficiently, while leading to many welfare concerns including painful skeletal problems. Pigs and cows were raised in industrial farming operations starting in the 1960s. Largely due to the efficiencies brought by industrial animal farming, American meat consumption (and therefore the number of animals in industrial farming facilities) rose dramatically beginning in the 1940s.

Animal experimentation also increased significantly over the course of the twentieth century, largely driven by the development of new drugs.

Following the decline of the anti-vivisection movement in the early-twentieth century, animal welfare and rights movements did not re-emerge until the 1950s. In 1955, the Society for Animal Protective Legislation (SAPL) was founded to lobby for humane slaughter legislation, and the Humane Methods of Slaughter Act (HMSA) was passed in 1958. Following public outcry over abuses of dogs reported in the media, the Animal Welfare Act was passed in 1966.

The animal welfare and rights movements grew in the 1970s with the publication of philosopher Peter Singer's influential Animal Liberation, and Henry Spira's successful and highly publicized campaigns against animal testing. The movements became more popular still with the founding of People for the Ethical Treatment of Animals (PETA) in 1980 and PETA's years-long legal battle over the Silver Spring monkeys, 17 research macaques found to be living in welfare-compromised conditions in an undercover investigation by PETA's Alex Pacheco.

== Laws ==
=== Federal ===
The 1958 HMSA was the first major federal law concerning animal welfare. The HMSA stipulates that animals be "rendered insensible to pain...before being shackled, hoisted, thrown, cast, or cut", and sets out which methods of slaughter are appropriate for which species. The enforcement of the HMSA is questionable. The law lacks a general enforcement mechanism - its original enforcement mechanism, the prohibition of federal purchases of animal products whose slaughter violated the HMSA, was repealed in 1978. In 2010 the Government Accountability Office (GAO) released a report criticizing the United States Department of Agriculture's (USDA) enforcement of the HMSA. Chickens, which account for over 95% of farm animals slaughtered in the U.S., are exempt from protection under the HMSA.

The basis of animal welfare legislation in the US is the Animal Welfare Act of 1966 (AWA). The original AWA was aimed at regulating the sale and transport of animals. The AWA is enforced by the USDA, APHIS, and the Animal Care agency.

Federal animal care standards mainly cover humane handling, housing, space, feeding, sanitation, shelter from extremes of weather, adequate veterinary care, transportation, and handling in transit.

The AWA was amended eight times, in 1970, 1976, 1985, 1990, 2002, 2007, 2008, and 2013.

In 1970, the Act was amended (Pub.L. 91–579) to include all warm-blooded animals used in testing, experimentation, exhibition, as pets or sold as pets. Certain cases could be exempted from such definitions unless they used live animals in substantial numbers. Fines were increased for those interfering with an investigation of an experimentation facility. Those found guilty of assaulting or killing Federal inspectors responsible for such tasks also faced additional sentencing. Basic treatment was expanded to include humane and reasonable handling of the animals, and required shelter from weather and temperature extremes, proper ventilation, adequate housing, decent sanitation, and adequate veterinary care at all stages in the animal's life.

The Act was further amended in 1976 (Pub.L. 94–279) to further regulate animal treatment during transportation. Animals were to be kept in adequately sized traveling accommodations, and to be kept from fighting amongst one another. The definition of animal was broadened to rid the law of the possible interpretation that dogs used for hunting, security, and breeding were not included in its protection.

The Act was amended in the Food Security Act of 1985 (Pub.L. 99–198). Under this law, it was not permitted for a single animal to be used in more than one major operative experiment, from which it was also allowed adequate time to recover as guided by a veterinarian with proper training. This amendment directed new minimum standards for the handling, housing, sanitation, feeding and other care practices. Requirements for psychological well-being of dogs and primates were made. The law also requires research facilities to be able to describe painful practices as well as implement practices that minimize pain and stress to the animals. Another requirement made under this law was for each research facility to establish an Institutional Animal Care committee to oversee research proposals and provide oversight of animal experimentation.

In 1990, The Food, Agriculture, Conservation, and Trade Act of 1990 was amended by adding SEC. 2503, Protection of Pets (Pub.L. 101–624). This section established a holding period for cats and dogs of not less than 5 days at a holding facility of the dealer, so that the animal could be adopted or recovered by their original owner before it is sold. The provision applies to operated pounds, research facilities, or private organizations. It also requires that a written certification with the animal's background be provided to the recipient. Details should include a description of the animal, history of the animal's transfers, records, and modifications, and signatures from the dealer and recipient. Repeat violations of this section are subject to a $5000 fine per cat or dog acquired or sold. Three or more violations could result in the dealer's license being permanently revoked. Prior to the Animal Welfare Act, animal welfare law was largely reactive and action could only be taken once an animal had suffered unnecessarily.

In 2002, Title X, Subtitle D, of the Farm Security and Rural Investment Act amended the Animal Welfare Act of 1966 by changing the definition of animal (Pub.L. 107–171). Section 2 of the Animal Welfare Act (7 U.S.C. 2132) was amended by changing exclusions specifically to birds, rats of the genus Rattus, and mice of the genus Mus to use in research. Additionally, this law expanded the regulation of animal fighting, making it a misdemeanor to ship, exhibit, or sponsor birds for fighting purposes. Penalties under this section could result in a fine of $15000.

In 2007, The Animal Fighting Prohibition Reinforcement Act amended section 26 of the Animal Welfare Act (Pub.L. 110–22). Its purpose was to strengthen prohibitions against animal fighting, and under the provisions of the AWA it made animal fighting a felony with punishment of up to 3 years in prison under Title 18 of the U.S. Code (Crimes and Criminal Procedure). The act also made it a felony to trade, have knives, gaffs or other objects that aided in use of animal fighting. Also, these provisions were designed to close the loopholes from the 2002 amendments.

In 2008, the Food, Conservation, and Energy Act of 2008, added several new amendments to the Animal Welfare Act (Pub.L. 110–246). It added more prohibitions to training, possessing and advertising animals or sharp objects for use in animal fighting. The penalties for these crimes were raised to 3–5 years imprisonment. The 2008 amendments also prohibited imports for resale of dogs unless they were at least six months of age, have all necessary vaccinations and are in good health. Furthermore, fines for violations of the Animal Welfare Act increased from $2500 to $10,000 per violation, per animal and per day.

In 2013, "An Act to Amend the Animal Welfare Act to Modify the Definition of 'Exhibitor'," added ‘‘an owner of a common, domesticated household pet who derives less than a substantial portion of income from a nonprimary source (as determined by the Secretary) for exhibiting an animal that exclusively resides at the residence of the pet owner,’’ after ‘‘stores,’’ in section 2(h).

No federal laws regulate the living conditions of farm animals. Based on its policies towards animals, the U.S. received a grade of D out of possible grades A, B, C, D, E, F, G on World Animal Protection's Animal Protection Index in both 2014 and 2020.

In regards to legislative attitudes towards animal welfare, a legislator's political party is the biggest influencer on how they will vote on a proposed animal welfare bill. Legislators representing the Democratic Party usually are the most in favor of bills that support legislation that improves animal welfare.

=== State ===
This table shows which states have enacted bans on various industrial farming practices considered to be inhumane.

| | Gestation crates | Veal crates | Extreme confinement of hens | Tail-docking | Foie gras |
|---|---|---|---|---|---|
| Arizona | X | X | | | |
| California | X | X | X | X | X |
| Colorado | X | X | | | |
| Florida | X | | | | |
| Maine | X | X | | | |
| Michigan | X | X | X | | |
| Ohio | X | X | X | X | |
| Oregon | X | | X | | |
| Rhode Island | X | X | | X | |

== Animal issues ==
=== Animals used for food ===
==== Animal agriculture ====
According to the USDA, the total number of land animals slaughtered for food in the U.S. has ranged between 8.9 and 9.5 billion since 2000. In 2015, approximately 9.2 billion land animals were slaughtered for food; 8.8 billion of these were chickens. The total number of farm animal deaths each year is considerably higher than the slaughter total, since at least tens of millions die before they are slaughtered.

While there are no official statistics on the number of aquatic animals killed for food in the U.S., scientist Noam Mohr estimated that 56 billion sea animals were killed to feed Americans in 2011.

==== Animal product consumption ====
In 2013, American meat consumption was second-highest among Organisation for Economic Co-operation and Development (OECD) countries (behind Australia) at 200.6 lbs per capita annually. Cow consumption has been decreasing since the 1970s, while chicken consumption has doubled.

According to a 2009 Food and Agriculture Organization (FAO), American egg consumption was higher than the developed countries’ average. Per-capita egg consumption in the U.S. climbed to 263 in 2014, the highest in recent years.

Per capita availability of dairy products dropped from 339.2 lbs in 1970 to 275.9 in 2012.

==== Vegetarianism and veganism ====
6% of respondents in a 1999 Gallup poll identified themselves as vegetarian, while 5% identified themselves as vegetarian a 2012 poll of 1014 respondents. 2% identified themselves as vegan in the 2012 poll. In a much larger survey (over 11000 respondents) conducted by the Humane Research Council in 2014, only 1.5% of respondents were vegetarian and 0.5% vegan.

While these poll numbers do not indicate an increase in vegetarianism and veganism, plant-based diets and the consumption of fewer animal products seem to be a growing trend.

=== Animals used for clothing ===
==== Leather ====
The United States is a major producer of leather. In 2012, it was the world's largest producer of bovine hide, and in 2013-2014 leather exports were among the highest ever.

==== Fur ====
3.76 million mink were killed for their fur on fur farms in the U.S. in 2014. There are very few federal or state regulations on fur farming aside from labeling laws and bans on dog and cat fur trade.

Americans trap and kill more wild animals for fur than any other country (up to 7 million annually), and the number of animals killed has increased substantially in recent years due to international demand. The steel-jaw trap, a trapping method widely considered inhumane and banned in over 80 countries, is legal in 42 of 50 American states and is the most common trapping method.

=== Animals used in science ===
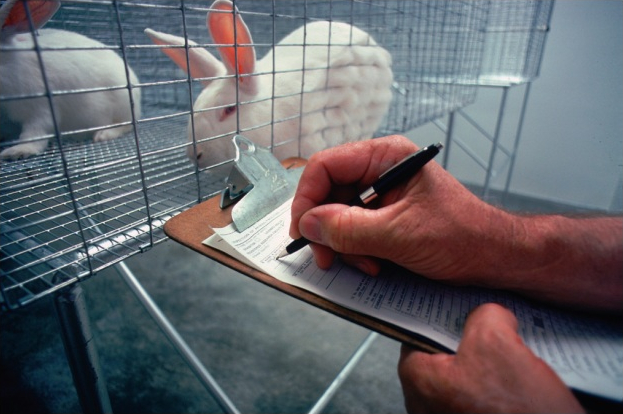
A laboratory rabbit being checked upon by an USDA inspector

In the US, every institution that uses vertebrate animals for federally funded laboratory research must have an Institutional Animal Care and Use Committee (IACUC). Each local IACUC reviews research protocols and conducts evaluations of the institution's animal care and use which includes the results of inspections of facilities that are required by law. The IACUC committee must assess the steps taken to "enhance animal well-being" before research can take place. This includes research on farm animals.

According to the National Institutes of Health Office of Laboratory Animal Welfare, researchers must try to minimize distress in animals whenever possible: "Animals used in research and testing may experience pain from induced diseases, procedures, and toxicity. The Public Health Service (PHS) Policy and Animal Welfare Regulations (AWRs) state that procedures that cause more than momentary or slight pain or distress should be performed with appropriate sedation, analgesia, or anesthesia.

However, research and testing studies sometimes involve pain that cannot be relieved with such agents because they would interfere with the scientific objectives of the study. Accordingly, federal regulations require that IACUCs determine that discomfort to animals will be limited to that which is unavoidable for the conduct of scientifically valuable research, and that unrelieved pain and distress will only continue for the duration necessary to accomplish the scientific objectives. The PHS Policy and AWRs further state that animals that would otherwise suffer severe or chronic pain and distress that cannot be relieved should be painlessly killed at the end of the procedure, or if appropriate, during the procedure."

The National Research Council's Guide for the Care and Use of Laboratory Animals also serves as a guide to improve welfare for animals used in research in the US. The Federation of Animal Science Societies' Guide for the Care and Use of Agricultural Animals in Research and Teaching is a resource addressing welfare concerns in farm animal research. Laboratory animals in the US are also protected under the Animal Welfare Act. The United States Department of Agriculture Animal and Plant Health Inspection Service (APHIS) enforces the Animal Welfare Act. APHIS inspects animal research facilities regularly and reports are published online.

According to the U.S. Department of Agriculture (USDA), the total number of animals used in the U.S. in 2005 was almost 1.2 million, but this does not include rats, mice, and birds which are not covered by welfare legislation but make up approximately 90% of research animals.

In 2015, an article in The New York Times on the U.S. Meat Animal Research Center, a scientific facility containing over 30,000 farm animals, stated that the animals there are grossly mistreated because farm animals are not included under the Animal Welfare Act of 1966. In September 2016, the United States Department of Agriculture released a report on an investigation into the material covered by the Times article, and recommended that the USDA "establish adequate policies, procedures, and processes related to oversight of animal welfare at USMARC."

=== Animals used in cosmetics tests ===
Testing cosmetics on animals is currently legal in the US. The Humane Cosmetics Act to prohibit testing cosmetics on animals was re-introduced to Congress in 2015.

=== Animals used for entertainment ===
The controversial practice of circus animal acts is legal in the US. In 2015 Ringling Bros. and Barnum & Bailey Circus announced it will phase out its use of elephants by 2018, but ended up shutting down in 2017. In May 2022, the circus announced it would resume touring in 2023 without the use of animals.

The keeping of cetaceans in captivity for entertainment is also legal. California has proposed legislation to ban the captive display of orcas, and the state of Washington has proposed banning the captivity of any cetacean for entertainment. Following major public backlash prompted by the 2013 film Blackfish, SeaWorld announced in 2015-16 that it will end its controversial orca shows and breeding program.

==== Dog fighting ====
In 2007, the U.S. Congress passed a Federal law against interstate dog fighting activities. The Animal Fighting Prohibition Reinforcement Act provided for felony-level penalties including multi-year prison sentences and large fines for each offence. Passage of this law was followed by the involvement of the Inspector General's Office of the U.S. Department of Agriculture in ongoing investigations around the United States.

In addition to the controversial treatment a dog receives when he has potential as a fighter, according to a filing in U.S. District Court in Richmond by Federal investigators in Virginia, which was obtained under the Freedom of Information Act and published by The Baltimore Sun on July 6, 2007, a losing dog or one whose potential is considered unacceptable faces "being put to death by drowning, strangulation, hanging, gun shot, electrocution or some other method".

"Bait" animals are often used to test a dog's fighting instinct. The "bait" is mauled or killed in the process. Often "bait" animals are stolen pets.

=== Rodeo ===
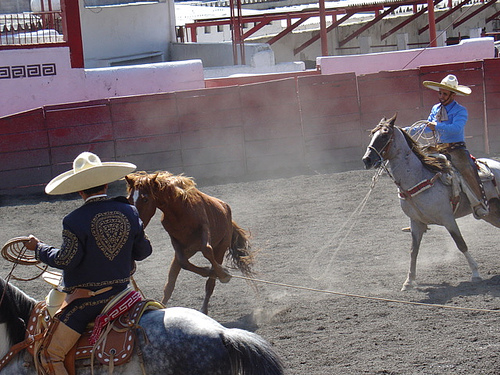
Horse tripping is a controversial charreada event banned in nine US states.

The welfare of animals in rodeo has been a topic of discussion for the industry, the public, and the law for decades. Protests were first raised in the 1870s, and, in the middle twentieth century, laws were enacted to curb events using animals. The American Humane Association (AHA) has worked with the rodeo industry (specifically, the PRCA) to establish rules improving animal welfare in rodeo and the treatment of rodeo animals.

Today, animal cruelty complaints in rodeo are still very much alive. The PRCA (which governs about a third of the rodeos conducted in the United States annually) has provided rules for its members regarding animal welfare. Some local jurisdictions have banned the use of certain rodeo tack or certain events such as tie down roping or steer tripping.

== Public opinion ==
A 2015 Gallup poll found that 32% of Americans agreed that animals should have the ”same rights as people”, up from 25% in 2008. 54% were "somewhat" or "very" concerned about animals raised for food and 67% about animals in research. A 2014 Pew Research Center poll found that 50% of respondents oppose animal testing, up from 43% in 2009.

== Animal movement ==
Animal activism is commonly divided into two camps: animal welfare and animal rights. Animal welfare is concerned with the humane treatment of animals but does not oppose all uses of animals, while animal rights is concerned with ending all human use of animals. The largest American animal nonprofit, The Humane Society of the United States (HSUS), is an animal welfare organization. PETA, Farm Animal Rights Movement (FARM), and Direct Action Everywhere (DxE) are animal rights organizations based in the U.S.

The activities of animal welfare and rights organizations include lobbying for animal protection legislation and better corporate animal welfare policies (e.g. cage-free egg campaigns), promoting reductions in animal product consumption, and conducting undercover investigations of industrial animal farms and animal research laboratories. The HSUS has been instrumental in the passage of several state-level bans on cruel farming practices, and Mercy for Animals' ongoing (as of April 2016) corporate cage-free egg campaign has helped bring about a number of corporate pledges to use cage-free eggs.

The Nonhuman Rights Project (NhRP) is an American civil rights organization working to obtain legal personhood for some animals. In 2013 the NhRP filed the first-ever lawsuits on behalf of chimpanzees, demanding courts grant them the right to bodily liberty via a writ of habeas corpus. The original petitions were denied, and legal efforts on behalf of the chimps are ongoing as of spring 2016. The NhRP plans to file a habeas corpus lawsuit on behalf of captive elephants later in 2016.

== See also ==
- Category:Animal welfare organizations based in the United States
- Fauna of the United States
- List of animal rights advocates
- Timeline of animal welfare and rights
- Timeline of animal welfare and rights in the United States
- Timeline of animal welfare and rights in Europe
- Abolitionism (animal rights)
- Universal Declaration on Animal Welfare
- U.S. Meat Animal Research Center
- Speciesism
