= George Fleming (veterinary surgeon) =

Scottish veterinary surgeon, activist, and writer (1833–1901)

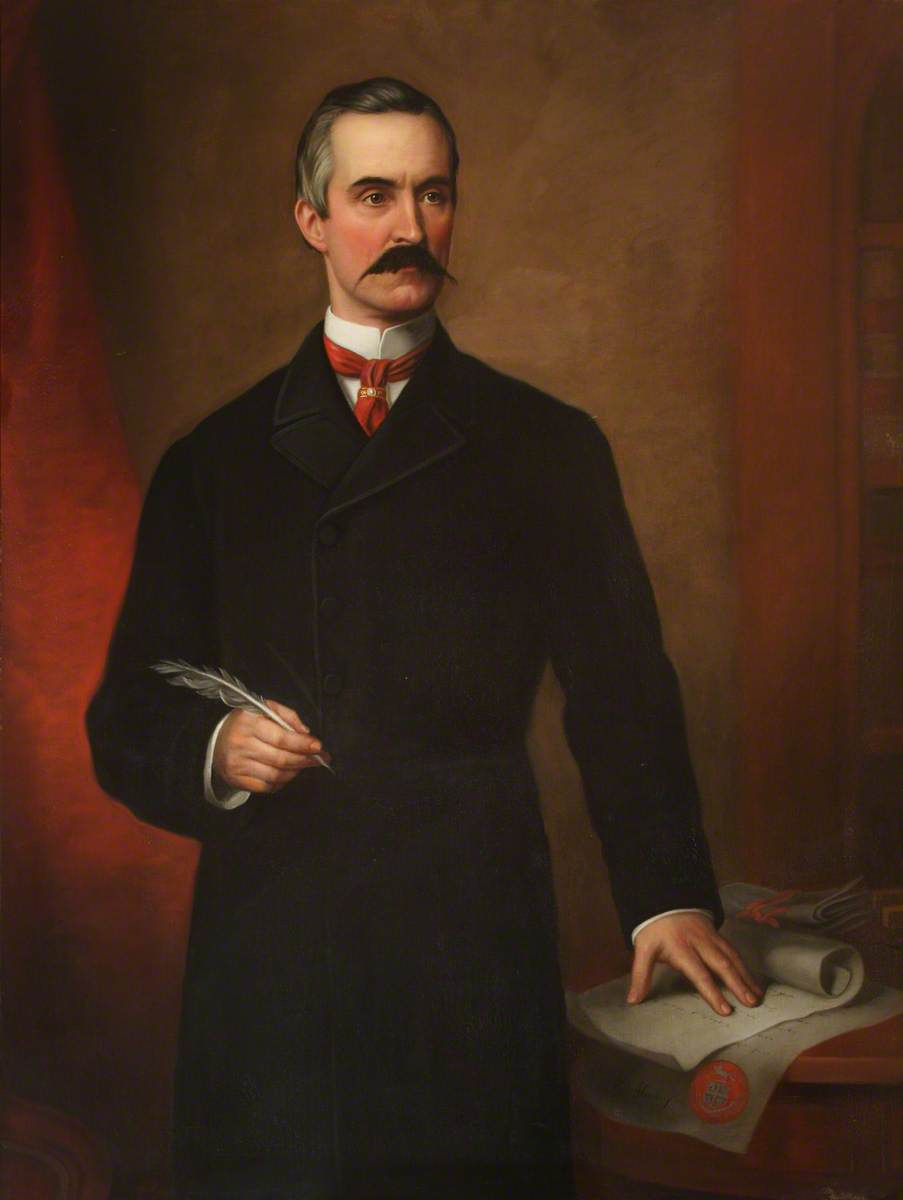
- Fleming in 1883 by B. Hudson
- Born: 11 March 1833; Glasgow, Scotland
- Died: 13 April 1901 (aged 68); Higher Leigh, Combe Martin, North Devon, England
- Occupations: Veterinary surgeon, activist, writer

George Fleming CB ( 11 March 1833 – 13 April 1901) was a Scottish veterinary surgeon and anti-vivisectionist. He was a prolific writer, and supported the passing of the Veterinary Surgeons Act 1881, which regulated the profession, in his time as President of the Royal College of Veterinary Surgeons.

== Life ==
Fleming was born in Glasgow on 11 March 1833, and when still young moved with his father to Manchester, where both of them worked as farriers for veterinary surgeon. A Manchester veterinary surgeon, John Lawson, sent him to Dick's College in Edinburgh. He took medals and prizes, and in 1855 obtained the certificate of the Highland and Agricultural Society of Scotland, at that time a recognised veterinary diploma. At the end of the year he entered the army veterinary service.

Fleming served through the Crimean War. In 1860, he volunteered for the Second Opium War, and was present at the Third Battle of Taku Forts and the surrender of Beijing, receiving for his services a medal with two clasps. In 1866, he obtained the diploma of the Royal College of Veterinary Surgeons, and in 1867, he served with the army in Syria and Egypt. On his return, he spent some years with the Royal Engineers at Chatham. In 1879, he was appointed inspecting veterinary surgeon at the War Office, and in 1883, he was appointed principal veterinary surgeon to the army. In 1887, he was made C.B., and in 1890, he retired from the army.

Fleming became a vice-president of the Royal College of Veterinary Surgeons in 1867, a year after his admission, and a member of council in 1868. He was elected president in 1880. Agitation for an act of parliament to restrict the title of veterinary surgeon to the diploma-holders of the College had become acute, and he helped securing the passage through parliament of the Veterinary Surgeons Act 1881, which imposed a penalty on unqualified persons who used the title of veterinary surgeon. He was then re-elected president for three years in succession (1881–4), and again in 1886–7.

In 1883 Fleming received the honorary degree of LL.D. from the University of Glasgow and he was appointed CB in the 1887 Golden Jubilee Honours. He gave his library of 900 books to the Royal College of Veterinary Surgeons in 1900. He died on 13 April 1901 at Higher Leigh, Combe Martin, North Devon, his residence in later life.

== Opposition to vivisection ==
Fleming was an anti-vivisectionist. In 1866, his essay Vivisection: Is it Necessary or Justifiable? won an RSPCA prize. It was republished as Vivisection: A Prize Essay in 1871 by the Woman's branch of the Pennsylvania Society for the Prevention of Cruelty to Animals. Fleming's essay was translated into German and was influential to anti-vivisectionists in Europe. It inspired Elpis Melena to write an anti-vivisection novel.

== Works ==
While Fleming was in China he made an expedition beyond the Great Wall, which he described in Travels on Horseback in Manchu Tartary (1865). He was a voluminous writer, contributing to professional journals and general reviews. His published works included:

- Vivisection: Is it Necessary or Justifiable? 1866.
- Horse-Shoes and Horse-Shoeing, 1869.
- Vivisection: A Prize Essay, 1871.
- Animal Plagues: their History, Nature, and Prevention, vol. i. 1871; vol. ii. 1882.
- Practical Horse-Shoeing, 1872; 10th edit. 1900.
- Rabies and Hydrophobia, 1872.
- A Manual of Veterinary Sanitary Science and Policy, 2 vols. 1875.
- Vivisection and the Diseases of Animals, 1882.
- The Influence of Heredity and Contagion in the Propagation of Tuberculosis, 1883.
- Operative Veterinary Surgery, vol. i. 1884.
- The Practical Horse-Keeper, 1886.
- A Text Book of Veterinary Obstetrics, 1878; 2nd edit. 1896.

He translated from the French Auguste Chauveau's Comparative Anatomy of the Domesticated Animals (1873; 2nd edit. 1891), and from Louis Georges Neumann's Parasites and Parasitical Diseases of the Domesticated Animals (1892; 2nd edit. 1905).

== Family ==
Fleming was three times married:

1. to Alice, daughter of J. Peake of Atherstone in 1863;
2. to Susan, daughter of W. Solomon of Upchurch, Kent, in 1878;
3. to Anna, daughter of Colonel R. D. Pennefather of Kilbracken, co. Leitrim, who survived him and afterwards remarried.

== Notes ==
Attribution

This article incorporates text from a publication now in the public domain: Lee, Sidney, ed. (1912). "Fleming, George". Dictionary of National Biography (2nd supplement). Vol. 2. London: Smith, Elder & Co.
