= Ernst von Weber =

German travel writer and animal welfare campaigner

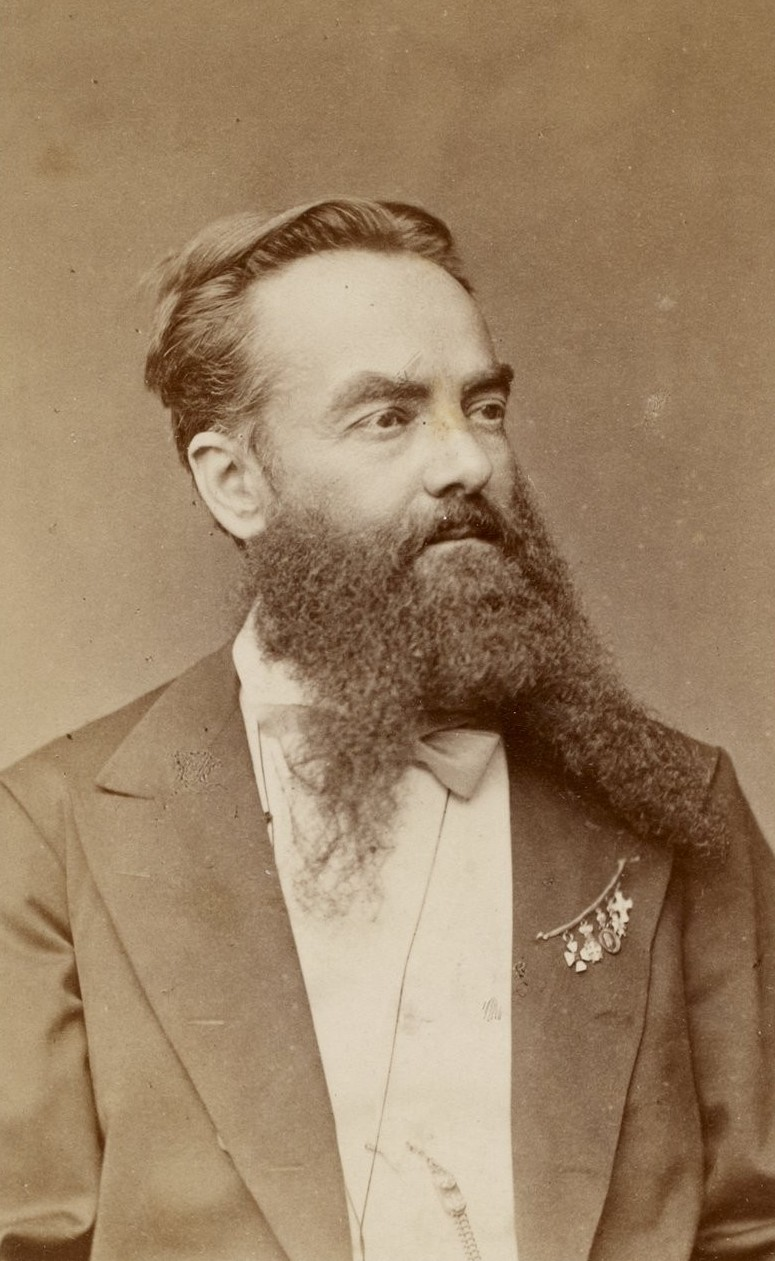
- Born: 7 February 1830; Dresden, Germany
- Died: 4 January 1902 (aged 71); Rome, Italy
- Occupation: Writer

Ernst von Weber (7 February 1830 – 4 January 1902) was a German travel writer, advocate of German colonization, animal welfare campaigner and opponent of vivisection.

== Biography ==
Weber was born in Dresden in 1830 as the son of canon lawyer Karl Gottlieb von Weber. After studying at the Technical University of Bergakademie Freiberg and at the University of Berlin, he became a farmer and then from 1851 onwards travelled several years to further his training, which took him to southern Europe, the Middle East, North Africa and the United States. From 1871 to 1875 Weber stayed in South Africa.

After his return from Africa, Weber campaigned in his homeland for the acquisition of colonies by the newly founded German Empire, initially using his voluminous memories of the years in Africa (1878) as a journalist with great success. This also explains why Weber was listed as an honorary member of the Society for German Colonization at the beginning of the 1890s. He was especially eager to colonise Africa as he had a stake in a South African diamond mine, and wished to continue and expand exploitation.

== Animal welfare ==
In Dresden, Weber spent much time campaigning against vivisection and for this purpose he founded the International Society for Combat Against Scientific Torture of Animals (also known as the International Association for Combating Scientific Animal Torture), in 1879 of which he was president. Weber's friend Marie Espérance von Schwartz was on the Society's directing committee. The Society published a monthly periodical Thier-und Menschenfreund (Friend to Animals and Humans) dedicated to animal welfare.

Weber was Vice-President of the Dresden Animal Protection Society which was also known as the Dresden Society for the Protection of Animals. In April 1878, Weber lectured to the Dresden Animal Protection Society on anti-vivisection. His lecture was published as a 77-page pamphlet, entitled Die Folterkammern der Wissenschaft in 1879. It was translated into English as Torture Chambers of Science.

The membership of Weber's International Society for Combat Against Scientific Torture of Animals increased from 565 registered members within a few months (March 1, 1880) grew to 6,000 members (beginning of 1881). Among the more famous members included Johanna von Puttkamer and the composer Franz Liszt. As President of the association, which from then on became the center of the movement against animal experiments in the German Reich, Weber achieved far-reaching social and political impact over many years, thanks to his own writings, lectures and publishing activities. Individual leaflets of the association reached a circulation of half a million copies. In addition to like-minded fellow campaigners such as Marie Espérance von Schwartz and Ernst Grysanowski, he was able to win over the composer Richard Wagner for the animal welfare cause. In 1879, Wagner wrote a supportive open letter to Weber condemning vivisection.

== Selected publications ==
- Torture Chambers of Science (1879)
