= U.S. Meat Animal Research Center =

US livestock research facility

Coordinates: 40.52666°N 98.14080°W

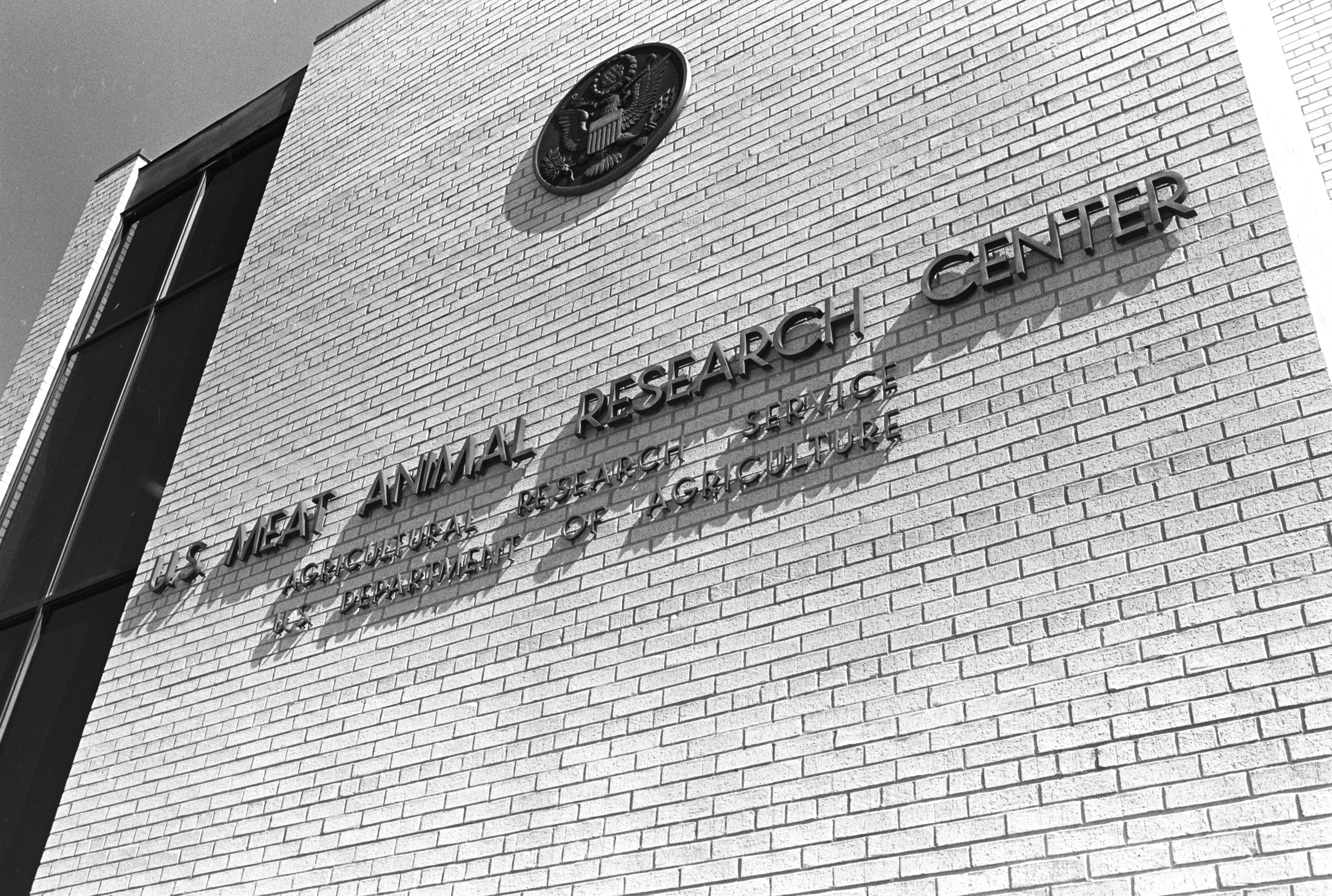
- USDA Meat Animal Research Center in Clay Center Nebraska in June 1976
- Established: June 16, 1964
- Focus: Research methods for increasing the efficiency of livestock production
- Location: 844 Road 313, Clay Center, Nebraska, 68933, United States
- Website: https://www.ars.usda.gov/plains-area/clay-center-ne/marc/

The Roman L. Hruska U.S. Meat Animal Research Center (USMARC) is a livestock research facility in Clay Center, Nebraska. The center researches methods for increasing the efficiency of livestock production. The center maintains around 30,000 animals for its experiments, 44 scientists, and 73 technicians. It is also used as a classroom for teaching animal care.

USMARC has developed a genetics program and a project for evaluating germplasm. The project grew into a large breed comparison study.

In January 2015, Michael Moss of The New York Times published an exposé on the mistreatment of research animals at USMARC after being approached by a scientist and veterinarian who worked at the center for 24 years. In September 2016, the USDA's Office of Inspector General released a report on an investigation into the material covered by the Times article. The report recommended that the USDA "establish adequate policies, procedures, and processes related to oversight of animal welfare at USMARC."

== History ==
The U.S. Meat Animal Research Center was designated by Congress on June 16, 1964, following the closure of the Naval Ammunition Depot, which produced bombs and shells during World War II. The property was transferred to the United States Department of Agriculture (USDA). On October 10, 1978, President Jimmy Carter signed into law a bill renaming the facility after former Senator Roman L. Hruska of Nebraska. It now center maintains around 30,000 animals for its experiments, 44 scientists, and 73 technicians. It is also used as a classroom for teaching animal care. The University of Nebraska–Lincoln has sent veterinary students to the center for over 25 years for training. All decisions about the animals' use and treatment are made by the center. Additionally, USMARC has developed a genetics program and a project for evaluating germplasm. The project grew into a large breed comparison study.

== New York Times exposé ==
In January 2015, Michael Moss of The New York Times published an exposé on the mistreatment of research animals at USMARC after being approached by a scientist and veterinarian who worked at the center for 24 years. The article stated that because the 1966 Animal Welfare Act contains an exemption for farm animals, the research center "has become a destination for the kind of high-risk, potentially controversial research that other institutions will not do or are no longer allowed to do." Among other things, the article commented that the center had no veterinarians on its staff, with surgical procedures done by workers without veterinary degrees or licenses; the research involves selectively breeding animals to give birth to too many children; that sheep are made to give birth unaided in open fields where newborns are killed by predators, harsh weather and starvation. It also stated that in 1985, a scientist wrote the director with a warning, “Membership [to other organizations] may bring more visibility [to USMARC activities], which we may not want.” In response, USDA officials said the center abides by federal rules on animal welfare.

== Interviews with past workers ==
During the Michael Moss's investigation, he interviewed many people who previously worked at the facility. According to a veterinarian who worked at the center for 24 years, those who work at USMARC "pay tons of attention to increasing animal production, and just a pebble-sized concern to animal welfare. And it probably looks fine to them because they’re not thinking about it, and they’re not being held accountable. But most Americans and even livestock producers would be hard pressed to support some of the things that the center has done." One time, according to the veterinarian, "There was a young cow, a teenager, with as many as six bulls. The bulls were being studied for their sexual libido, and normally you would do that by putting a single bull in with a cow for 15 minutes. But these bulls had been in there for hours mounting her. The cow’s head was locked in a cage-like device to keep her immobile. Her back legs were broken. Her body was just torn up.” The cow died a few hours later due to her injuries.

A longtime director of the USMARC's veterinarian teaching program said, "It should have been the best research center in the world, and it’s not. The death loss was higher than it should have been.” A visiting student from Brazil recalls that "Some days, 30 to 40 percent of the lambs were dead, and some of those still alive were in bad condition, separated from the moms, and they would be dead the next morning. As a vet, you always appreciate animal welfare, and you want to have all of your patients taken care of and looking good and being fed.”

== USDA report ==
In September 2016, the USDA's Office of Inspector General released a report on an investigation into the material covered by the Times article. The investigators non-statistically selected 33 specific statements to evaluate the veracity of the article’s expressed concerns. The report stated that 7 were materially accurate, 13 were lacking context, 2 were inaccurate, and the descriptions of the other 11 statements had been censored. It recommended that the USDA "establish adequate policies, procedures, and processes related to oversight of animal welfare at USMARC," and that the USDA "should improve its oversight of USMARC and make its research more transparent to the public."

The first Times statement that was said to be inaccurate is the following, "Little known outside the world of big agriculture, the center has one overarching mission: helping producers of beef, pork and lamb turn a higher profit as diets shift toward poultry, fish, and produce.” The report said this was inaccurate because the stated mission of the research center is to “[develop] scientific information and new technology to solve high priority problems for the U.S. beef, sheep, and swine industries.” According to the report, "Solving high-priority problems may result in increased profits for these industries. However, increasing profits is not USMARC’s stated mission."

The second Times statement that was said to be inaccurate is, "Last year, the center set out to show that its cows could thrive on a growth stimulant called Zilmax. Months earlier, the drug had been withdrawn by its manufacturer, Merck & Company, amid concern in the meat industry that it caused rare complications, like hooves that slough off, and was associated with higher death rates." According to the report, this is inaccurate because "while USMARC has conducted research involving Zilmax since the drug was removed from the market in 2013, none of the experiments included an objective to prove that cows could thrive on the stimulant. [The objectives of the experiments] involved determining if feeding [Zilmax] to steers decreases or increases their energy requirements and to estimate the effects of [Zilmax] on heat stress, animal performance, and carcass characteristics."

== See also ==
- Animal testing
- Animal welfare in the United States
- Animal Welfare Act of 1966
- The three Rs
