= Laboratory animal sources =

Animals used by laboratories for testing purposes are largely supplied by dealers who specialize in selling them to universities, medical and veterinary schools, and companies that provide contract animal-testing services. It is comparatively rare that animals are procured from sources other than specialized dealers, as this poses the threat of introducing disease into a colony and confounding any data collected. However, suppliers of laboratory animals may include breeders who supply purpose-bred animals, businesses that trade in wild animals, and dealers who supply animals sourced from pounds, auctions, and newspaper ads. Animal shelters may also supply the laboratories directly. Some animal dealers, termed Class B dealers, have been reported to engage in kidnapping pets from residences or illegally trapping strays, a practice dubbed as bunching.

== Dealers in the United States ==
All laboratories using vertebrate lab animals in the United States are required by law to have a licensed veterinarian on staff and to adhere to the NIH Guide for the Use and Care of Laboratory Animals, which further stipulates that all protocols, including the sources for obtaining the animals, must be reviewed by an independent committee.

=== Class A dealers ===
Class A breeders are licensed by the U.S. Department of Agriculture (USDA) to sell animals bred specifically for research. In July 2004, there were 4,117 licensed Class A dealers in the United States.

=== Class B dealers ===
Class B dealers are licensed by the USDA to buy animals from "random sources". This refers to animals who were not purpose-bred or raised on the dealers' property. Animals from "random sources" come from auctions, pounds, newspaper ads (including "free-to-home" ads), and some may be stolen pets or illegally trapped strays. As of February 2013, there were only seven active Class B dealers remaining in the United States. However, these sources round up "thousands" of cats and dogs each year for sale.

==== Animal shelters ====
Animals are also sold directly to laboratories by shelters. According to the American Society for the Prevention of Cruelty to Animals (ASPCA), Iowa, Minnesota, Oklahoma, South Dakota, and Utah require publicly funded shelters to surrender animals to any Class B dealer who asks for them. Fourteen states prohibit the practice, and the remainder either have no relevant legislation, or permit the practice in certain circumstances.

==== Bunching ====
According to a paper presented to the American Society of Criminology in 2006, an illegal economy in the theft of pets, mostly dogs, has emerged in the U.S. in recent years, with the thieves known as "bunchers". The bunchers sell the animals to Class B animal dealers, who pay $25 per animal. The dealers then sell the animals to universities, medical and veterinary schools, and companies providing animal-testing services. Lawrence Salinger and Patricia Teddlie of Arkansas State University told the conference that these institutions pay up to $500 for a stolen animal, who is often accompanied by forged documents and fake health certificates. Salinger and Teddlie argue that the stolen animals may affect research results, because they come from unknown backgrounds and have an uncertain health profile. Conversely the Foundation for Biomedical Research claim that pets being stolen for animal research is largely an urban myth and that the majority of stolen dogs are most likely used for dog fighting.

The largest Class B dealer in dogs in the U.S. was investigated for bunching by the U.S. Department of Agriculture (USDA) in 2005. Chester C. Baird, of Martin Creek Kennels and Pat's Pine Tree Farms in Willifore, Arkansas, lost his licence after being convicted of 100 counts of animal abuse and neglect, and of stealing pets for laboratories and forging documentation. The criminal charges were filed after an eight-year investigation by an animal protection group, Last Chance for Animals. The group filmed over 72 hours of undercover video at Martin Creek Kennels, which included footage of dogs being shot. In 2006, HBO produced Dealing Dogs, a documentary film based on this footage.

Baird's customers included the University of Missouri, University of Colorado Health Sciences Center, and Oregon State University. According to the Humane Society of the United States, Missouri was experiencing such a high rate of pet theft that animal protection groups had dubbed it the "Steal Me State". In a 2008 article, Last Chance for Animals estimated that around two million pets are stolen in the U.S. each year.

== Dealers in the European Union ==
Animal dealers in the European Union (EU) are governed by Council Directive 86/609/EEC. This directive sets forth specific requirements regulating the supply and breeding of animals intended for use by testing facilities within the EU. The directive defines 'breeding establishment' as a facility engaged in breeding animals for their use in experiments, and 'supplying establishment' as a facility other than a breeding establishment, which supplies animals for experiments.

Article 15 of the directive requires supplying establishments to obtain animals only from approved breeding or other supplying establishments, "unless the animal has been lawfully imported and is not a feral or stray animal." Nonetheless, the directive allows exemptions from this sourcing requirement "under arrangements determined by the authority."

Animal rights supporters have raised concerns that these rules allow strays and pets to be used for experimentation, either by exemptions or by importing animals from non-EU countries, where the rules may be more lax.

In 2010, a new EU directive was published on the protection of animals used for scientific purposes, repealing the old directive 86/609/EEC on January 1, 2013, with the exception of Article 13 (statistical information on the use of animals in experiments) which has been repealed on May 10, 2013.

== See also ==
- American Association for Laboratory Animal Science
- Pepper (dog)
