= Animal Welfare Act of 1966 =

U.S. federal law

- Long title: Animal Welfare Act of 1966 intended to regulate the transport, sale and handling of dogs, cats, guinea pigs, nonhuman primates, hamsters and rabbits intended to use for research or other purposes.
- Acronyms (colloquial): AWA
- Enacted by: the 89th United States Congress
- Effective: August 24, 1966

Citations
- Public law: P.L. 89-544
- Statutes at Large: 80 Stat. 350

Codification
- U.S.C. sections created: 7 U.S.C. § 2131 et seq.

Legislative history
- Signed into law by President Lyndon B. Johnson on August 24, 1966

Major amendments
- P.L. 91-579, P.L. 94-279, P.L. 91-579, P.L. 99-198, P.L. 107-171

The Animal Welfare Act (Laboratory Animal Welfare Act of 1966, Pub. L. 89–544) was signed into law by President Lyndon B. Johnson on August 24, 1966. It is the main federal law in the United States that regulates the treatment of animals in research and exhibition. Other laws, policies, and guidelines may include additional species coverage or specifications for animal care and use, but all refer to the Animal Welfare Act (otherwise known as the "AWA") as the minimally acceptable standard for animal treatment and care. The USDA and APHIS oversee the AWA and the House and Senate Agriculture Committees have primary legislative jurisdiction over the Act. Animals covered under this Act include any live or dead cat, dog, hamster, rabbit, nonhuman primate, guinea pig, and any other warm-blooded animal determined by the Secretary of Agriculture for research, pet use or exhibition. Excluded from the Act are birds, rats of the genus Rattus (laboratory rats), mice of the genus Mus (laboratory mice), farm animals, and all cold-blooded animals.

As enacted in 1966, the AWA required all animal dealers to be registered and licensed as well as liable to monitoring by Federal regulators and suspension of their license if they violate any provisions of the Animal Welfare Act and imprisonment of up to a year accompanied by a fine of $1,000. As of the 1985 AWA amendment, all research facilities covered by the Animal Welfare Act have been required to establish a specialized committee that includes at least one person trained as a veterinarian and one not affiliated with the facility. Such committees regularly assess animal care, treatment, and practices during research, and are required to inspect all animal study areas at least once every six months. The committees are also required to ensure that alternatives to animal use in experimentation would be used whenever possible.

== History ==
Worldwide, the first law to regulate animal experimentation was Cruelty to Animals Act 1876, passed by the Parliament of the United Kingdom. It established a central governing body that reviewed and approved all animal use in research. After that, numerous countries in Europe adopted regulations regarding research with animals.

Although Congress discussed laboratory animal welfare in the early 1960s, there was not enough interest to pass legislation until articles published by Sports Illustrated and Life in 1965 and 1966, respectively, generated a public outcry.

The first article, written by Coles Phinizy, appeared in the November 29, 1965, issue of Sports Illustrated. The piece detailed the story of Pepper the Dalmatian, a dog that disappeared from the yard of the Lakavage family home in Pennsylvania. It was later discovered that Pepper had been stolen by "dog-nappers", was bought by a Bronx hospital, and had died during an experimental surgical procedure. On July 9, 1965, Representative Joseph Y. Resnick introduced H.R. 9743 into the House of Representatives, a bill that would require dog and cat dealers, as well as the laboratories that purchased the animals to be licensed and inspected by the USDA. A hearing was held on September 30, 1965, and similar legislation was sponsored in the Senate. The (Laboratory) Animal Welfare Act of 1966 was signed into law on August 24, 1966.

In 1966, Life magazine published an article documenting the housing conditions at animal dealer facilities. The article, titled "Concentration Camp for Dogs", featured pictures of skeletal dogs and described the neglectful conditions that the investigative journalists and Maryland State Police found at a Maryland dog dealer's farm. As a result of these articles, the public lobbied Congress to pass a Federal law that would institute animal housing and care standards.

There was increasing evidence that dogs and cats kept as pets were being stolen by dealers, taken across states lines, and resold to research institutions for scientific experimentation. Many sportsmen supported national legislation because it was their hunting dogs that often went missing.

The Horse Protection Act (public Law 91-929) was passed in 1970 and protected horses against various damaging practices designed to produce aesthetically appealing horses, for example, "soring" the ankles to produce a high-stepping gait. Marine mammals as a class (whales, porpoises, seals, and polar bears), for the most part, found protection under the passage of the Marine Mammal Protection Act (Public Law 92-522) of 1972, which prevented extinction or depletion from indiscriminate taking, including hunting, harassment, capture, and killing (permitted takings, including for subsistence and research purposes, must be accomplished humanely, with "the least degree of pain and suffering practicable to the animal"). Endangered and threatened species were also protected with the passage in 1973 of the Endangered Species Act (Public Law 93-205), which made illegal the purchase, sale, or transportation in interstate or foreign commerce any species found to be endangered, and also closely regulated commerce in any species threatened with extinction.

=== Amendments ===
The Act was amended eight times (1970, 1976, 1985, 1990, 2002, 2007, 2008, and 2013) and is enforced by the USDA through the Animal Care division of APHIS (Animal and Plant Health Inspection Service).

In 1970, the Act was amended (Pub.L. 91–579) to include all warm-blooded animals used in testing, experimentation, exhibition, as pets or sold as pets. Certain cases could be exempted from such definitions unless they used live animal in substantial numbers. Fines were increased for those interfering with an investigation of an experimentation facility. Those found guilty of assaulting or killing Federal inspectors responsible for such tasks also faced additional sentencing. Basic treatment was expanded to include humane and reasonable handling of the animals, and required shelter from weather and temperature extremes, proper ventilation, adequate housing, decent sanitation, and adequate veterinary care at all stages in the animal's life.

The Act was further amended in 1976 (Pub.L. 94–279) to further regulate animal treatment during transportation. Animals were to be kept in adequately sized traveling accommodations, and to be kept from fighting amongst one another. The definition of animal was broadened to rid the law of the possible interpretation that dogs used for hunting, security, and breeding were not included in its protection.

The Act was amended in the Food Security Act of 1985 (Pub.L. 99–198). Under this law, it was not permitted for a single animal to be used in more than one major operative experiment, from which it was also allowed adequate time to recover as guided by a veterinarian with proper training. This amendment directed new minimum standards for the handling, housing, sanitation, feeding and other care practices. The psychological well-being of the animals was now taken into consideration as it never had been before. One provision that stood out at this time was the requirement for the exercise of dogs and psychological well being of primates. The law also requires research facilities to be able to describe painful practices as well as implement practices that minimize pain and stress to the animals. Another requirement made under this law was for each research facility to establish an Institutional Animal Care and Use Committee (IACUC) to oversee research proposals and provide oversight of animal experimentation. The Food Security Act also established an information center at the National Agricultural Library, the Animal Welfare Information Center, to assist researchers in searching scientific literature for alternatives to animal use.

In 1990, The Food, Agriculture, Conservation, and Trade Act of 1990 was amended by adding SEC. 2503, Protection of Pets (Pub.L. 101–624). This section established a holding period for cats and dogs of not less than five days at a holding facility of the dealer, so that the animal could be adopted or recovered by their original owner before it is sold. The provision applies to operated pounds, research facilities, or private organizations. It also requires that a written certification with the animal's background be provided to the recipient. Details should include a description of the animal, history of the animal's transfers, records, and modifications, and signatures from the dealer and recipient. Repeat violations of this section are subject to a $5000 fine per cat or dog acquired or sold. Three or more violations could result in the dealer's license being permanently revoked. Prior to the Animal Welfare Act, animal welfare law was largely reactive and action could only be taken once an animal had suffered unnecessarily.

In 2002, Title X, Subtitle D, of the Farm Security and Rural Investment Act amended the Animal Welfare Act of 1966 by changing the definition of animal (Pub.L. 107–171). Section 2 of the Animal Welfare Act (7 U.S.C. 2132) was amended by changing exclusions specifically to birds, rats of the genus Rattus, and mice of the genus Mus to use in research. Additionally, this law expanded the regulation of animal fighting, making it a misdemeanor to ship, exhibit, or sponsor birds for fighting purposes. Penalties under this section could result in a fine of $15000.

In 2007, The Animal Fighting Prohibition Reinforcement Act amended section 26 of the Animal Welfare Act (Pub.L. 110–22). Its purpose was to strengthen prohibitions against animal fighting, and under the provisions of the AWA it made animal fighting a felony with punishment of up to 3 years in prison under Title 18 of the U.S Code( Crimes and Criminal Procedure). The act also made it a felony to trade, have knives, gaffs or other objects that aided in use of animal fighting. Also, these provisions were designed to close the loopholes from the 2002 amendments.

In 2008, the Food, Conservation, and Energy Act of 2008, added several new amendments to the Animal Welfare Act (Pub.L. 110–246). It added more prohibitions to training, possessing and advertising animals or sharp objects for use in animal fighting. The penalties for these crimes were raised to 3–5 years imprisonment. The 2008 amendments also prohibited imports for resale of dogs unless they were at least six months of age, have all necessary vaccinations and are in good health. Furthermore, fines for violations of the Animal Welfare Act increased from $2500 to $10,000 per violation, per animal and per day.

In 2013, "An Act to Amend the Animal Welfare Act to Modify the Definition of 'Exhibitor'," added an owner of a common, domesticated household pet who derives less than a substantial portion of income from a nonprimary source (as determined by the Secretary) for exhibiting an animal that exclusively resides at the residence of the pet owner, after stores, in section 2(h).

Legislative and regulatory documents tracing the history of the Animal Welfare Act can be found on the Animal Welfare Act History Digital Collection.

== Licensing and registration ==
The U.S Department of Agriculture (USDA) requires businesses that either buy or sell warmblooded animals, exhibit them to the public, transport them commercially, or use them in teaching or experiments, must be licensed or registered. Failure to become licensed or registered is a punishable violation of the Animal Welfare Act. Depending on the basis of the business, the Animal and Plant Health Inspection services (APHIS) determines whether the business should be licensed, registered, or both. Business owners are responsible for knowing about registration and licensing requirements.

=== Businesses and activities covered ===
Federal animal care standards mainly cover humane handling, housing, space, feeding, sanitation, shelter from extremes of weather, adequate veterinary care, transportation, and handling in transit. The same standards of animal care apply to all registered and licensed businesses. To make sure the regulation and standards are followed, APHIS field inspectors make periodic unannounced visits to all locations where animals are held.

If any facility does not meet federal standards when they apply for a license or registration, they can receive up to three inspections within a period 90 days to correct any problems. The licenses are not issued until all problems are corrected. The facilities have to wait for a minimum of six months before reapplying for a license if they do not pass inspection within the 90-day period. Legal action results if the facility operates a regulated business without a license.

Under the Animal Welfare Act, exhibitors and animal dealers must obtain a license, for which an annual fee is charged. APHIS does not issue a license until it inspects the facility and finds it to be in compliance with its regulations. Research facilities and animal transporters do not need a license, but must be registered with APHIS.

==== Animal dealers ====
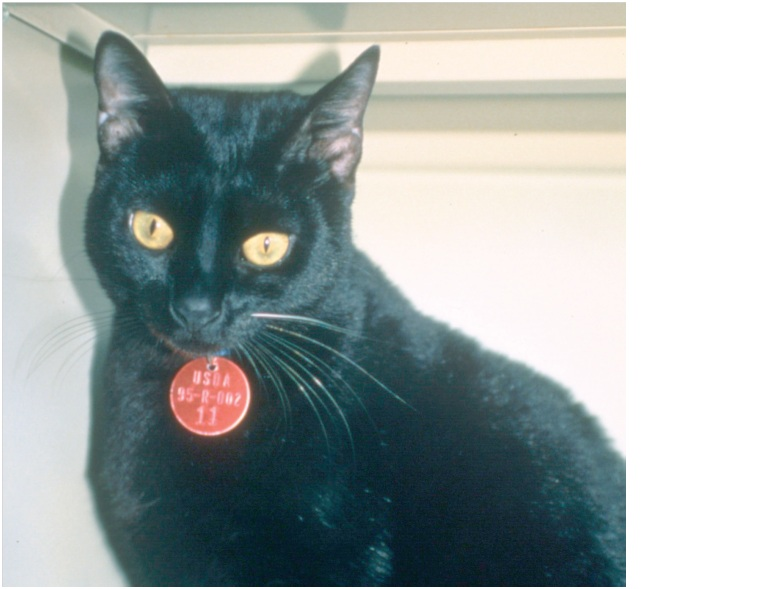
Dealers that breed animals for sale to pet stores must be in compliance with AWA regulations.

Animal dealers are people who sell animals bred at their facility. Examples of dealers include pet and laboratory animal breeders and brokers, auction operators, and everyone who sells exotic or wild animals, or dead animals or their parts. They must be licensed under class "A" or "B". Class A licenses are given to breeders who deal only in animals they breed and raise. Class B licenses are given to people who buy and sell animals they did not raise. Exempt from the law and regulations are retail pet stores, those who sell pets directly to pet owners, hobby breeders, animal shelters, and boarding kennels. The annual license fee for licensed animal dealers (Class A or B) ranges from $30 to $750, depending on the annual dollar volume of business in regulated animals. An annual application fee of $10 must be paid with all yearly license renewal applications.

==== Exhibitors ====
An exhibitor is a business or a person that displays animals to the public. Exhibitors must be licensed by APHIS under Class C licenses. Exhibitors include zoos, educational displays or exhibits, marine mammal shows, circuses, carnivals, and animal acts. The law and regulations exempt agricultural shows and fairs, horse shows, pet shows, game preserves, hunting events, and private collectors who do not exhibit. The annual license fee for Class C licensed animal exhibitors ranges from $30 to $300, depending on the number of regulated animals held. In addition to the annual license fee, an application fee of $10 must be paid with all yearly license renewal applications.

==== Transporters ====
A person with a commercial business that moves animals from one location to another is considered a transporter under the AWA. Animal transporters must be registered, including general carriers such as trucking companies, airlines, and railroads. Businesses that contract to transport animals for compensation are considered dealers and must have licenses.

==== Research facilities ====
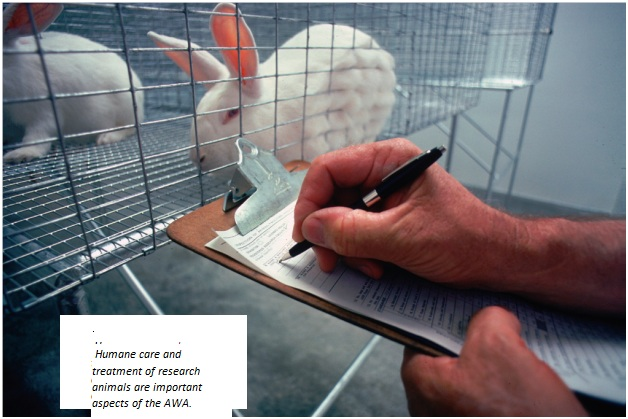
Humane care and treatment of research animals are important aspects of the AWA.

Research facilities are those that use animals for teaching, experimentation, surgery, or testing purposes. Research facilities must be registered, and include state and local government-run research laboratories, universities, and colleges, diagnostic laboratories, and pharmaceutical firms. Federal facilities, elementary and secondary schools, and agricultural research institutions are among those exempt from registration.

=== Exclusions ===
There is much debate as to the actual definition of an animal, but for the purpose of AWA, birds, rats, mice, horses, and other farm animals were excluded from its protection as initially legislated in 1966. The most commonly used animals in laboratories are rats and mice, and therefore they were not regulated in the original law. Purpose-bred rats of the genus Rattus and mice of the genus Mus are not covered by the Animal Welfare Act, but are regulated under PHS policy which applies only to research receiving federal funding from certain federal agencies, including the NIH. These are not federal laws but conditions of funding.

Certain conditions are also excluded from coverage by AWA. Animals that are killed prior to usage, such as frogs used in a biology class, are also not included, so long as they are killed humanely.

Facilities that do not receive Federal funding were also not covered by the Act.

In January 2015 Michael Moss of The New York Times published an exposé on the alleged mistreatment of research animals at the U.S. Meat Animal Research Center. Among other things, Moss's article asserted that the center had no veterinarians on its staff, with surgical procedures done by workers without veterinary degrees or licenses; and that the Act contains an exemption for farm animals used in agricultural research, which exemption covers the USMARC's activities.

== Enforcement ==
=== Investigations and inspections ===
APHIS's Animal Care (AC) program oversees the AWA, which includes about 10,300 facilities. These AC officials make unannounced facility inspections to ensure they are in compliance with regulations, and to identify unregistered facilities. They make such inspections or investigations of any dealer, exhibitor, research facility, handler, carrier, or operator of an auction sale, to determine if they have violated provisions under this chapter. Under the Animal Welfare Act, these facilities are to be inspected at least once a year, with follow-up inspections conducted until deficiencies are corrected. If deficiencies are found, failure to correct them could result in fines, cease and desist orders, suspensions, confiscation of animals and loss of licensing. There are also penalties for interfering with inspections.

=== Violations ===
If the Secretary of Agriculture has any reason to suspect that any licensed dealer, carrier, or operator violates any provision of the AWA, then their license may be suspended temporarily, but not to exceed 21 days, until a hearing is held. After the hearing, the license may be revoked if the violation is determined to have occurred.

Any dealer, carrier, exhibitor, handler, operator, or research facility that violates any provision of the AWA may be assessed a penalty of no more than $10,000 for each violation. Any person who knowingly fails to obey an order made by the Secretary of Agriculture is subject to a civil penalty of $1,500 for each offense.

Any dealer, exhibitor, carrier, handler, auction operator, or research facility may seek a review of an order within 60 days at the United States Court of Appeals.

=== Incidents ===
The 2006 HBO film Dealing Dogs documents an undercover operation targeting a "Class B" kennel which treated dogs inhumanely, violating the Act. The owners of the kennel were fined over $200,000 as the result of a USDA suit.

In 2011, the Dollarhite family of Nixa, Missouri, were fined $90,643 for selling several thousand dollars' worth of rabbits without a license, which is required of people selling more than $500 worth of rabbits sold as pets. The USDA has increased enforcement of the law in recent years, targeting magicians who perform magic tricks with rabbits.

In 2013, the USDA found that China Southern Airlines had improperly transported over a thousand monkeys without federal permission in insecure crates. The airline was forced to pay $26,038 worth of fines after over a dozen of them died.

== Court cases ==
=== International Primate Protection League v. Institute for Behavioral Research ===
In 1981, a graduate student and PETA member, Alex Pacheco, volunteered at a research center in Silver Spring, Maryland. At the time, Edward Taub was conducting research on monkeys for neuroplasticity purposes at that center. While Alex spent time at the research center, he noticed the inhumane treatment of the monkeys under the AWA and reported it to the police. He filed suit against Edward Taub, who was researching afferent ganglia. Edward Taub was convicted of six animal cruelty charges, which were appealed in the second trial. They proved to be significant in the understanding of the law. While this case provided an advancement in neurology research, it was doing so only by risking inhumane treatment of animals. As the court wrote in its opinion:

To imply a cause of action in these plaintiffs might entail serious consequences. It might open the use of animals in biomedical research to the hazards and vicissitudes of courtroom litigation. It may draw judges into the supervision and regulation of laboratory research. It might unleash a spate of private lawsuits that would impede advances made by medical [sic] science in the alleviation of human suffering. To risk consequences of this magnitude in the absence of clear direction from the Congress would be ill-advised. In fact, we are persuaded that Congress intended that the independence of medical [sic] research be respected and that administrative enforcement govern the Animal Welfare Act.

=== Animal Legal Defense Fund v. Glickman ===
In 1998, a court case was argued on behalf of the Animal Legal Defense Fund v. Daniel Glickman (then the Secretary of Agriculture), for the inhumane treatment of a primate named Barney at a Long Island game farm park and zoo. A man named Marc Jurnove had visited this park on a regular basis and noticed this primate had been neglected. He filed suit against the USDA for failing to meet the minimum standards under the AWA and his allegations were supported by investigations. The U.S. Court of Appeals, D.C. Circuit Court ruled that he had standing to sue. The merits of the case were determined by a later case: Animal Legal Defense Fund v. Glickman, 204 F.3d 229 (2001), in which the Court rejected Jurnove's argument and upheld the validity of the USDA regulations.

=== 907 Whitehead Street, Inc. v. U.S. Secretary of Agriculture ===
In 2012, in the case of 907 Whitehead Street, Inc. vs U.S. Secretary of Agriculture (USDA), the plaintiff challenged the jurisdiction of the USDA and its Animal and Plant Health Inspection Service to regulate the Ernest Hemingway Home and Museum as an animal exhibitor. The museum is home to dozens of polydactyl cats, the progeny of a cat that Ernest Hemingway was given as a pet when he lived there during the 1930s. Following a complaint by a museum visitor, the USDA visited the museum and in October 2003, determined that the Museum was an animal exhibitor subject to regulation under the AWA because the Museum exhibited the cats for the cost of an admission fee, and the cats were used in promotional advertising. Under USDA regulations, the museum is required to obtain a USDA exhibitor's license, give each cat a tag for identification purposes, provide additional resting surfaces within their existing enclosures, and introduce one of several specified improvements required to ensure the cats remain contained to the museum's grounds. The museum challenged on several grounds the USDA's authority in the case, noting that the Hemingway cats do not have an effect on interstate commerce sufficient to merit federal regulation. As of December 2012, the case had reached the United States Court of Appeals for the Eleventh Circuit, which upheld earlier district court rulings.

== Public relations ==
The USDA enforces the AWA and conducts regular inspections. Animal care will perform inspections in response to public concerns for the conditions of regulated facilities. They encourage individuals to report unregulated facilities that may require licenses or registration. Many state and local governments have animal welfare laws of their own.

Animal care seeks to educate the public and create a cooperative relationship with licensed and registered entities, the animal protection community, and other Federal and State agencies. To accomplish this goal, Animal care conducts workshops regarding minimum care standards as outlined in the AWA.

== Proposed amendments ==
Many animal welfare groups and animal activists support strengthening and further enforcement of the act. The act is often criticized for its exclusions of rats and mice, which are the most widely used laboratory animals. Although the act was amended to include all warmblooded animals in 1970, birds, mice, and rats were subsequently excluded in 2002. Some, however, feel that additional animals that are not warmblooded, should be included in the act's protection. Some members of Congress have supported additional funding for enforcing the act.

There have been numerous sanctions taken against individuals and agencies that have been found in violation. A database of violations, reports, and sanctions on behalf of the United States Department of Agriculture (USDA) can be found on the Animal and Plant Health Inspection Service website.

== See also ==
- Animal Welfare Act 2006 – United Kingdom act
- Animal Welfare Institute
- The Humane Society of the United States
