= Pepper (dog) =

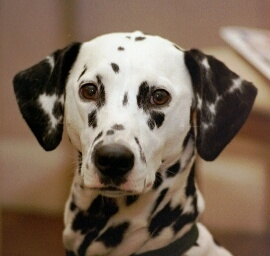
A Dalmatian dog, Pepper's breed

Pepper was a female Dalmatian dog from Pennsylvania, United States, who disappeared in 1965, eventually to turn up euthanized in a New York hospital, having been stolen by an animal dealer who supplied vivisectionists. Pepper's story, along with a Life magazine article titled "Concentration Camp for Dogs", led to members of the United States Congress and Senate being bombarded with angry letters, the volume of which surpassed briefly those about either Civil Rights and the Vietnam War. This campaign resulted in lawmakers passing the Animal Welfare Act of 1966.

== Background ==
In the early 1960s, American animal testing facilities used about 60,000 dogs a year. Of these dogs, only about 20,000 came from breeders who produced them explicitly for testing. More often, they came from "pound seizure", the act of picking up strays from shelters. Beginning in the 1940s, many states passed laws requiring shelters to release animals to testing labs. Dog dealers could receive $10 to $15 for each dog they provided. Some dogs released to labs were not strays, but in fact stolen pets.

Once the dogs had been acquired by dealers, they were frequently kept in inhuman conditions. Dogs became emaciated, with frozen entrails frequently the only food provided. Sometimes they would be crammed into sheds or trailers with as many as 120 other dogs, unable to move. Many of the dogs died before they were sold to labs. Dead dogs would be frozen, burned, or simply amassed in piles which could reach four to five feet in height.

== Stealing and death ==
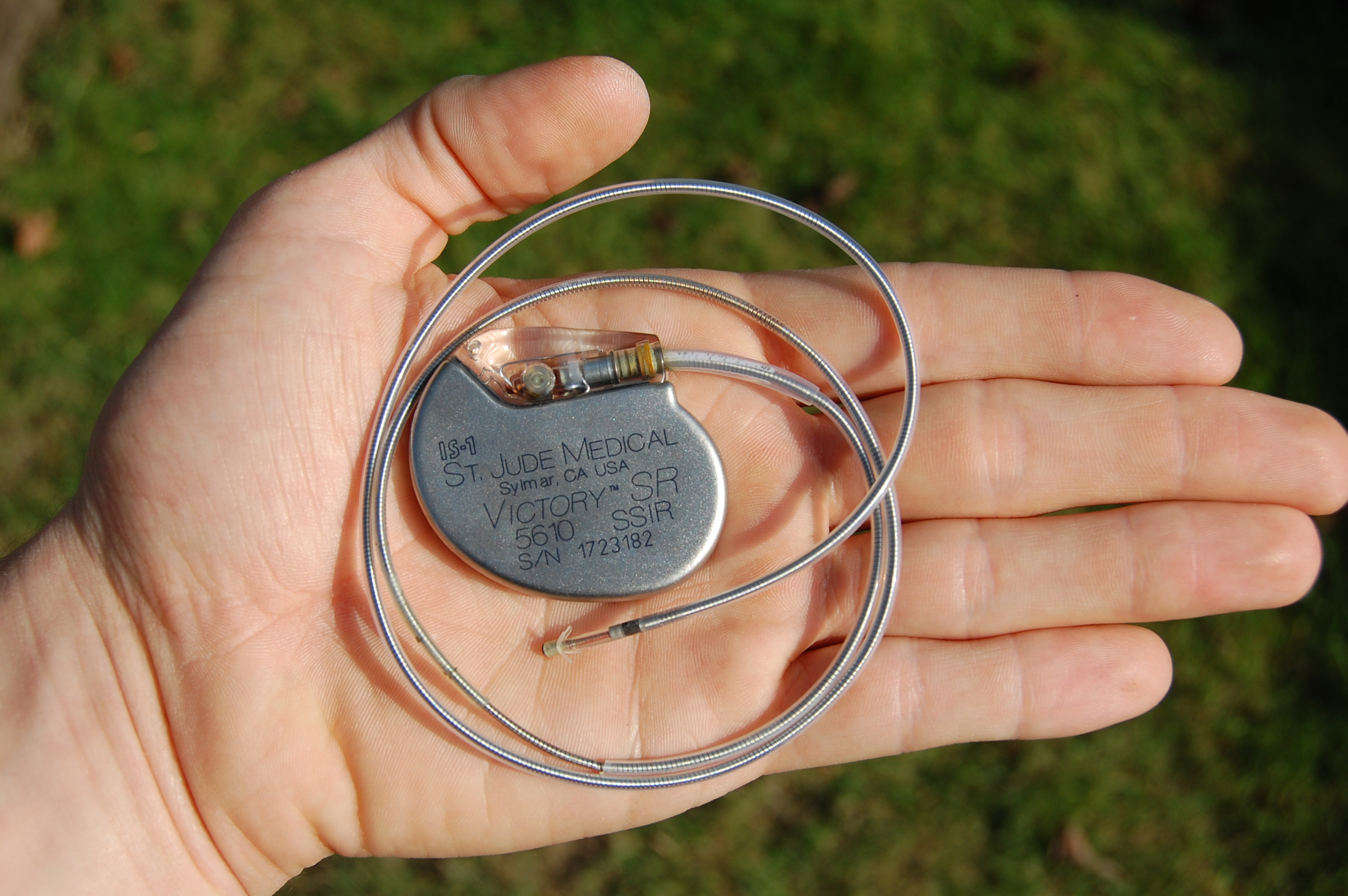
An artificial pacemaker. Pepper died when one such device was surgically implanted in her.

Pepper was a 5-year old Dalmatian bitch who lived on a farm in Slatington, Pennsylvania, owned by Peter and Julia Lakavage. Julia, who was known to adopt stray dogs, would often bring Pepper with her to her job at a hospital. On 22 June, 1964, Pepper was stolen by William Miller, a salesman who supplied dogs to laboratories for scientific experiment. It is thought that she willingly approached Miller's truck as she was trusting of humans. Miller had claimed that the dogs were going to a farm in High Falls, New York, but in fact sold Pepper and another Dalmatian to Montefiore Hospital in New York City. Pepper was implanted with a pacemaker, but died on the operating table. Pepper's owners spent nine months searching for her before they learned what had happened.

== Aftermath ==
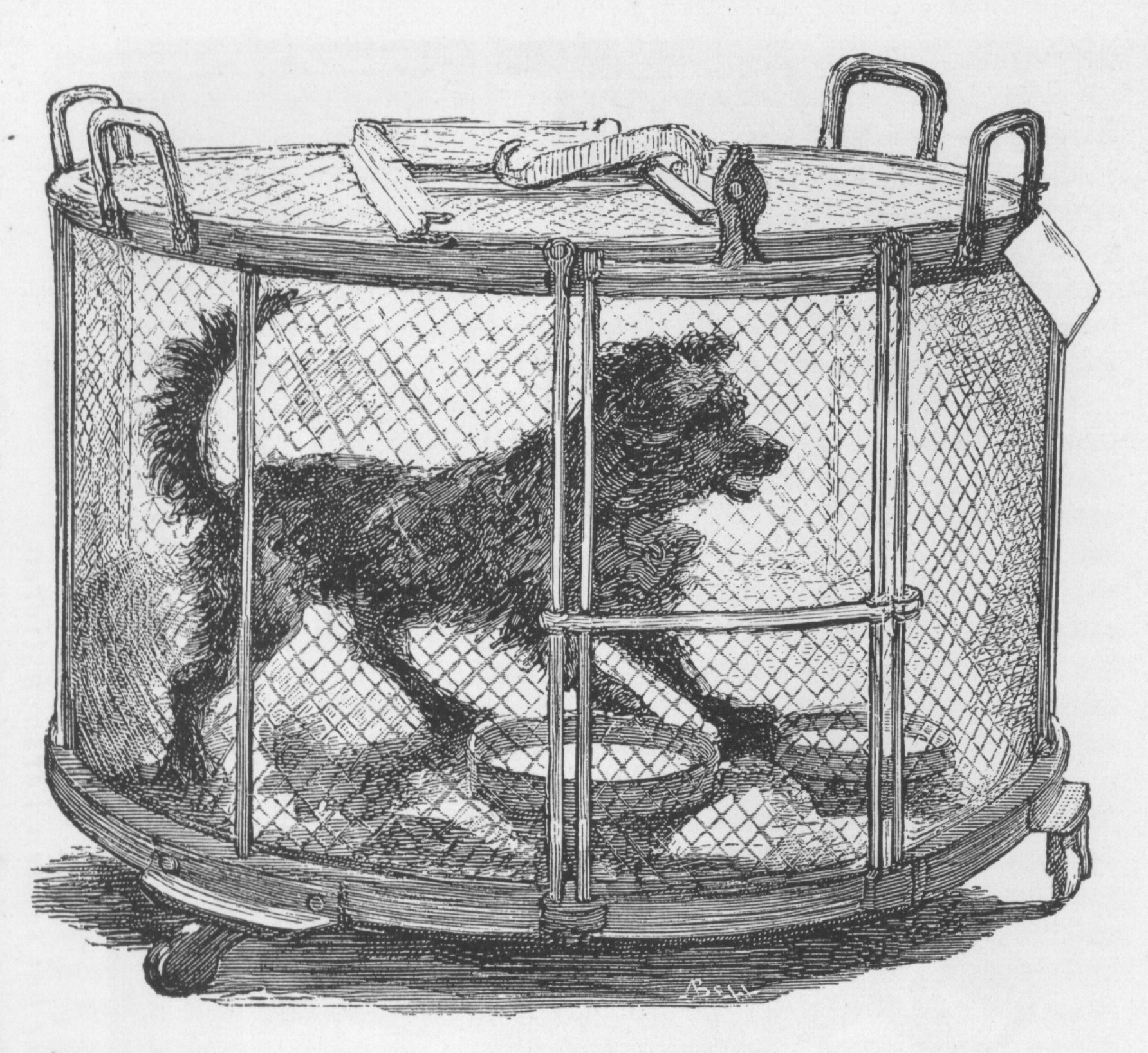
1884 illustration of a Louis Pasteur experiment, in which a dog was given a rabies vaccine. Dogs have long been used in medical experiments.

Pepper's disappearance and death were widely covered in the media, especially after Life Magazine picked up the story in an eight-page article titled "Concentration Camps for Dogs". Thousands of people wrote enraged letters to the United States Congress and Senate, which, for a time, outnumbered the letters sent regarding the Vietnam War or the civil rights movement. The incident inspired some dog owners to put signs up on their property discouraging dog thieves.

Representative Joseph Resnik of New York had been contacted by the Lakavages during their search for Pepper, when they attempted to gain access to the High Falls farm that Pepper was said to be at. Resnik was denied access to the farm. Seven days after Pepper's fate was discovered, he authored the Laboratory Animal Welfare Act, which called for the licensing of animal dealers and penalties for the stealing of pets. It was nicknamed "Pepper's Law". The Act created two types of licenses, Class A and Class B, for animal dealers. A Class A license allows the dealer to sell only animals that they have raised, while Class B allows the sale of animals from "random sources" such as breeders and pounds. Passed in 1966 and was signed by President Lyndon B. Johnson, it was expanded into the Animal Welfare Act in 1970.

By 2007, only 11 Class B dealers sold dogs to laboratories, making up 3% of dogs used in American research. As of 2026, though several states allow pound seizure to occur, Oklahoma is the only state that still has mandatory pound seizure laws.

== See also ==
- Brown Dog affair, a similar incident fifty years before in the UK
- Laboratory animal sources
