= Willem van Eelen =

Dutch researcher and businessperson (1923–2015)

- Van Eelen in 2013
- Born: Willem Frederik van Eelen; 4 July 1923; Dutch East Indies
- Died: 24 February 2015 (aged 91); Amsterdam, Netherlands
- Education: University of Amsterdam
- Occupations: Researcher; businessperson
- Known for: Work on cultured meat

Willem Frederik van Eelen (4 July 1923 – 24 February 2015) was a Dutch researcher and businessperson associated with the early development of cultured meat. He has been described as one of the "godfathers of cultured meat".

== Biography ==
Van Eelen was born in the Dutch East Indies on 4 July 1923, the son of a doctor. During the Second World War, he served in the Royal Netherlands East Indies Army. After the Japanese occupation of the Dutch East Indies, Van Eelen was captured and spent the rest of the war as a prisoner. According to Chase Purdy, his experiences in prisoner-of-war camps shaped his later view of cruelty and hardship.

After the war, Van Eelen studied psychology at the University of Amsterdam. After attending a lecture on meat preservation, he developed the idea of growing meat in a laboratory. Van Eelen was not a vegetarian, but was concerned about the treatment of animals and said that "[g]rowing meat without inflicting pain seemed a natural solution."

After graduating, Van Eelen attended medical school and contacted research scientists and biologists while trying to develop the idea. He left medical school after a tutor told him that he would need to raise money to fund the research. Van Eelen and his wife later ran restaurants and art galleries, saving spare money towards the idea.

By the 1990s, with help from investors, Van Eelen had raised US$750,000. His first patent was filed in 1994, followed by several others.

In 2014, Van Eelen had a stroke and was hospitalised. He died in Amsterdam on 24 February 2015, aged 91. He was buried in Noordwijk.
