= Elpis Melena =

Anglo-German writer

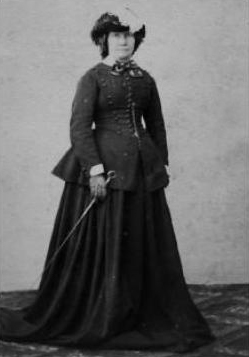
Elpis Melena.

Elpis Melena (born Marie Espérance von Schwartz; 1818–1899) was a German writer.

== Life and career ==
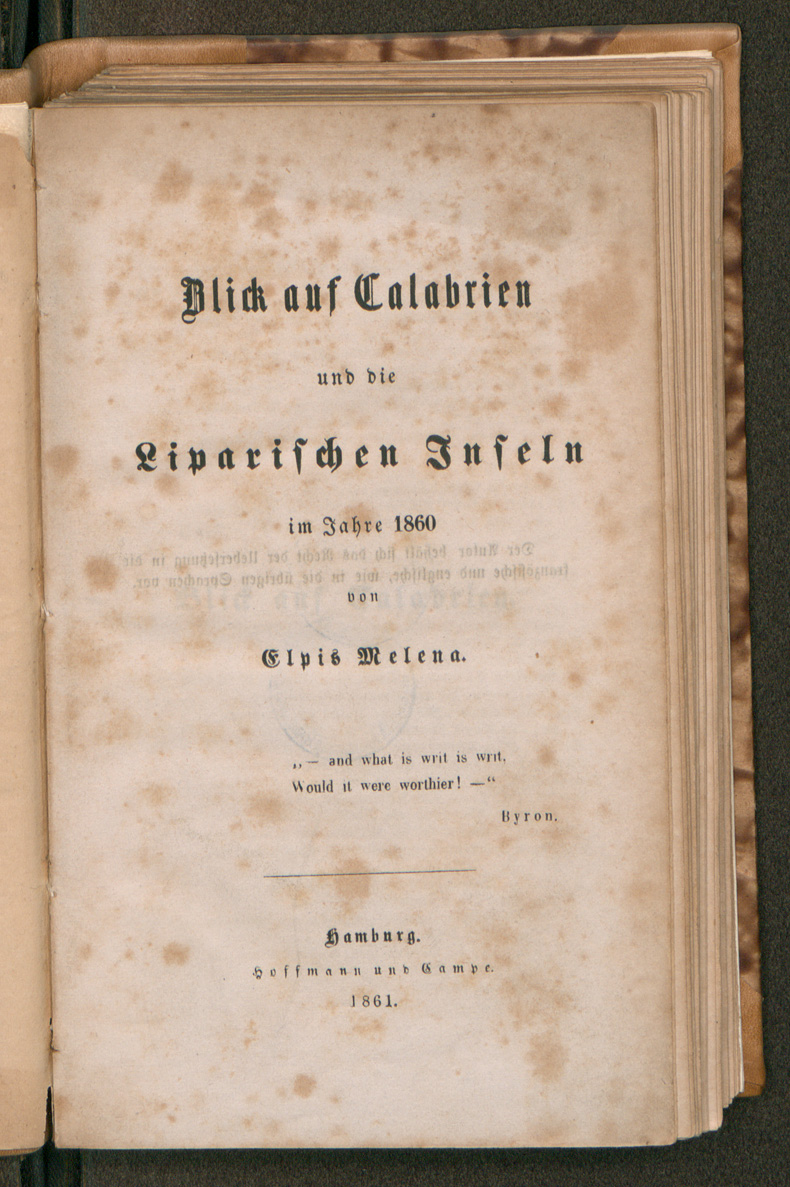
Blick auf Calabrien und bei Liparischen Inseln im Jahre 1860, 1861

Daughter of a Hamburg banker, she was born in England and spent much of her early life in Italy and England. She was well known in connection with the movement for Italian unity and freedom and edited the first version of Garibaldi's memoirs in German, published in English in 1887. After first meeting Garibaldi on the island of Caprera in 1857 she received affectionate letters from him and an ultimately unsuccessful proposal of marriage in 1858. After 1865 she lived in Chania.

She took interest in animal welfare and criticized animal testing. In 1875, she read a German translation of George Fleming's vivisection essay which inspired her anti-vivisection novel Gemma, oder Tugend und Laster (translated as Gemma, or Virtue and Vice). Melena's novel has been described as "mobilizing public opinion against vivisection in Germany".
