= Massachusetts Body of Liberties =

1641 legal code

The Liberties of the Massachusets Collonie in New England
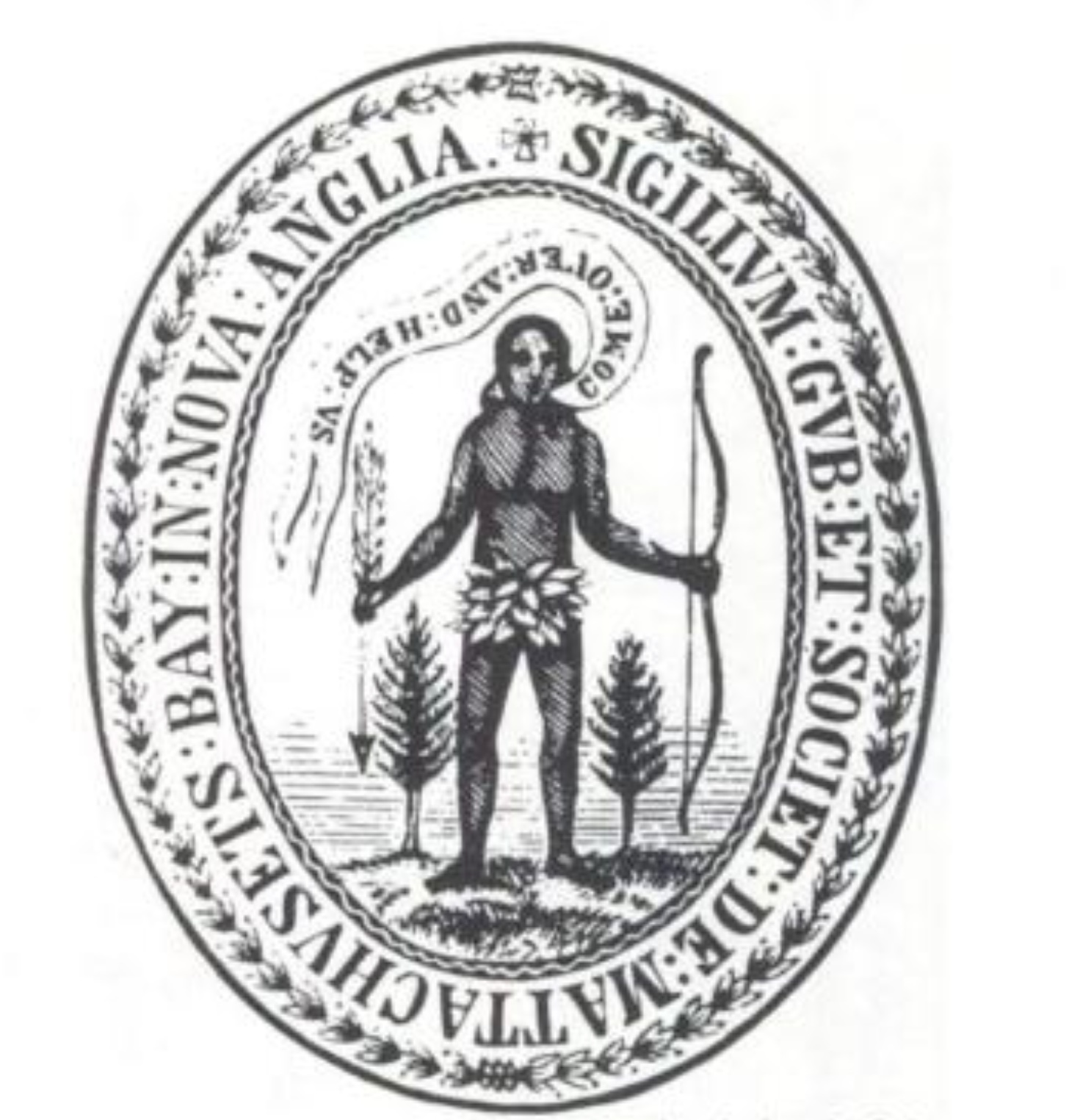
- Seal of the Massachusetts Bay Colony
- Type: Legal Code
- Context: Puritan migration to New England (1620–1640)
- Drafted: 1641
- Expiration: 1684
- Ratifiers: Great and General Court of Massachusetts

The Massachusetts Body of Liberties was the first legal code established in New England, compiled by Puritan minister Nathaniel Ward. The laws were established by the Massachusetts General Court in 1641. The Body of Liberties begins by establishing the exclusive right of the General Court to legislate and dictate the "Countenance of Authority".

In 1684, King Charles II revoked the Body of Liberties and reinstated English law over the Commonwealth. King James II established the Massachusetts Colony, and the Body of Liberties took effect and remained so until it was replaced by the 1691 Provincial Charter.

Though towns such as Dedham and Watertown had already established them, the Body of Liberties recognized boards of selectmen for the first time.

The Massachusetts Body of Liberty was the basis of the first legal code in the Province of New Hampshire, which was known as the Cutt Code. Many of the laws were indistinguishable from the Massachusetts version.

== Rights acknowledged ==
The Body of Liberties was one of the earliest protections of individual rights in America. Unlike many of the English sources of the time, the Body of Liberties was express in many of its grants and far more supportive of individual rights. Despite the grants, the rights were modifiable by the General Court.

To varying degrees, the document contained rights that would later be included in the Bill of Rights. Many of the other rights are now considered fundamental components of procedural due process, such as rights to notice and hearing before the court. The rights also contained in the Bill of Rights included freedom of speech, a right against uncompensated takings, a right to bail, a right to jury trial, a right against cruel and unusual punishment, and a right against double jeopardy.

There is a partial prohibition of monopolies:

No monopolies shall be granted or allowed amongst us, but of such new Inventions that are profitable to the Countrie, and that for a short time.

In addition, the Body of Liberties also contained other individual rights, including a prohibition of a compulsory draft except for territorial defense; prohibition of an estate tax; the freedom of all "house holders" to fishing and fowling on public land; and a declaration that a married woman should be "free from bodilie correction or stripes by her husband."

The Body of Liberties also contained regulations against "Tirranny or Crueltie" toward domestic animals, which were the first American modern animal protection laws.

Passage 92: "No man shall exercise any Tirranny or Crueltie towards any bruite Creature which are usuallie kept for man's use."

=== Slavery ===
Some of the liberties legislated are explicitly cited as originating from biblical sources. Many of the liberties established still exist in both law and practice in the Commonwealth today, but some do not. The justification for slavery of Africans in Passage 91 of the Body of Liberties was likely based on an interpretation of scriptural passages of the New Testament, such as Ephesians 6:5 and Titus 2:9. Full liberties and political rights were extended only to men who had been approved as members of their local Puritan church.

Passage 91: "There shall never be any bond slaverie, villinage or Captivitie amongst us unles it be lawfull Captives taken in just warres, and such strangers as willingly selle themselves or are sold to us. And these shall have all the liberties and Christian usages which the law of god established in Israel concerning such persons doeth morally require. This exempts none from servitude who shall be Judged thereto by Authoritie."

Native Americans taken prisoner during wars were shipped to the West Indies, where they would be slaves on the sugar cane plantations. Returning ships brought African-born and -descended slaves to New England. The provision that only war captives or purchased slaves could be kept was enforced: in 1645, the owners of a ship that was determined to have brought two black men who had been kidnapped in Africa were sentenced to send them back, together with an apology from Massachusetts. Slavery was legal in Massachusetts until 1783, when the Massachusetts Supreme Court ruled that slavery went against the Constitution of Massachusetts.
