= Edward Taub =

American neuroscientist, born 1931

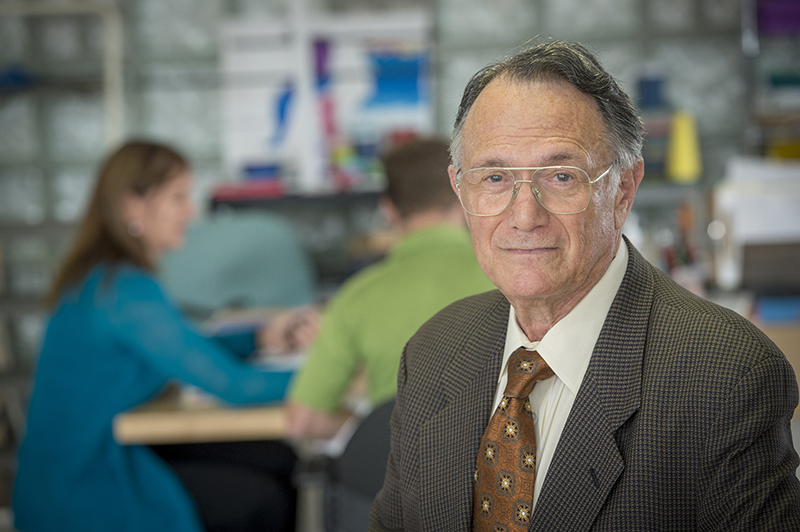
Edward Taub in 2014

Edward Taub (born 1931, Brooklyn New York) is a behavioral neuroscientist on the faculty at the University of Alabama at Birmingham. He is best known for his involvement in the Silver Spring monkeys case, for making discoveries in the area of neuroplasticity, and developing constraint-induced movement therapy; a family of techniques which helps the rehabilitation of people who have developed learned non-use as a result of suffering neurological injuries from a stroke or other cause.

Taub's techniques have helped survivors regain the use of paralysed limbs, and was hailed in 2002 by the American Stroke Association as being "at the forefront of a revolution". The Society for Neuroscience cited Taub's work as one of top 10 translational Neuroscience accomplishments of the 20th century and he was awarded the 2004 Distinguished Scientific Contribution Award from the American Psychological Association.

Taub holds a B.A. from Brooklyn College, a M.A. from Columbia University, and a Ph.D. from New York University. He was married to opera singer Mildred Allen.

== Silver Spring trial ==
Taub's studies have involved using animal test subjects, including seventeen macaque monkeys living inside the Institute of Behavioral Research in Silver Spring, Maryland. These monkeys, known as the Silver Spring monkeys, became the focus of a protest spearheaded by Alex Pacheco of the animal-rights group PETA in 1981.

After Pacheco submitted his allegations to the authorities, Taub was charged with 119 counts of animal cruelty and failing to provide adequate veterinary care. At the conclusion of the first bench trial 113 cruelty charges were dismissed by the judge, largely because a Department of Agriculture veterinarian who had made unannounced visits to the laboratory had testified that he did not find the conditions depicted by Pacheco. Taub was convicted of six misdemeanor charges of failing to provide adequate veterinary care and fined $3,500. Five of these were dismissed at a second jury trial and the final charge was set aside by an appellate court, which found that the Maryland's Prevention of Cruelty to Animals law was never intended to apply to researchers.

The National Institutes of Health initiated its own investigation and suspended the remaining funding for Taub's experiments, over $200,000, due to violations of animal care guidelines. After Taub was exonerated by the courts, sixty-seven professional societies made representation on Taub's behalf and the NIH reversed its decision not to fund him.

== Work on stroke recovery ==
In 1987 Taub moved to the University of Alabama-Birmingham, and began to focus on the area of stroke-recovery. Taub sought to investigate the potential for "constraint-based therapy" to help in the recovery of movement in affected limbs. With an impaired arm, for instance, the therapy involves restraining the patient's good arm over a period of intensive therapy on the affected arm. Sharon Begley writes that Taub and his colleagues' work achieved major progress in the area of neuroplasticity, by targeting the conditions in which the brain can adapt and repair itself after an injury. This original work has since been translated into clinical practice protocols with the development of modified constraint induced therapies used on an outpatient basis, led by Dr. Stephen Page and subsequently by others, and by the adoption of a high duration, modified protocol of Taub's own that is now featured in Taub's clinic.

== Selected papers ==
- Taub, Edward; Perrella, Philip; Barro, Gilbert. "Behavioral Development after Forelimb Deafferentation on Day of Birth in Monkeys with and without Blinding", Science, Vol. 181. no. 4103, September 7, 1973, pp. 959–960.
- Taub, E. (1977). Movement in nonhuman primates deprived of somatosensory feedback. Exercise and sports science reviews, Vol. 4 (pp. 335–374). Santa Barbara: Journal Publishing Affiliates.
- Taub, E. (1980). Somatosensory deafferentation research with monkeys: Implications for rehabilitation medicine. In L. P. Ince (Ed.), Behavioral Psychology in Rehabilitation Medicine: Clinical Applications (pp. 371–401). New York: Williams & Wilkins.
- Taub, E. (1994). Overcoming learned nonuse: A new behavioral medicine approach to physical medicine. In J. G. Carlson, S. R. Seifert, & N. Birbaumer. (eds.) Clinical applied psychophysiology (pp. 185–220). New York: Plenum.
- Taub, E., Burgio, L., Miller, N. E., Cook, E.W. III, Groomes, T., DeLuca, S., & Crago, J. (1994). An operant approach to overcoming learned nonuse after CNS damage in monkeys and man: The role of shaping. Journal of the Experimental Analysis of Behavior, 61, 281–293.
- Taub, E., & Crago, J. E. (1995). Behavioral plasticity following central nervous system damage in monkeys and man. In B.Julesz & I. Kovacs (Eds.), Maturational windows and adult cortical plasticity. SFI Studies in the Sciences of Complexity, vol. 23 (pp. 201–215). Redwood City, CA: Addison-Wesley.
- Taub, E., Pidikiti, R. D., DeLuca, S. C., & Crago, J. E. (1996). Effects of motor restriction of an unimpaired upper extremity and training on improving functional tasks and altering brain/behaviors. In J. Toole (Ed.), Imaging and Neurologic Rehabilitation (pp. 133–154). New York: Demos Publications.
- Taub, E., & Wolf, S.L. (1997). Constraint-Induced (CI) Movement techniques to facilitate upper extremity use in stroke patients. Topics in Stroke Rehabilitation, 3, 38–61.
