= People for the Ethical Treatment of Animals =

American animal rights organization

- Logo used since 1980
- Founded: March 22, 1980; 46 years ago
- Founders: Ingrid Newkirk; Alex Pacheco
- Type: 501(c)(3)
- Purpose: Animal rights
- Location: Norfolk, Virginia, United States
- President: Tracy Reiman
- Senior VP, Laboratory Investigations Department: Kathy Guillermo
- Revenue: US$85.7 million (2024)
- Website: www.peta.org

People for the Ethical Treatment of Animals (PETA; /ˈpiːtə/ PEE-tə) is an American animal rights and vegan non-profit organization based in Norfolk, Virginia, and originally led by Ingrid Newkirk, its co-founder.

Founded in March 1980 by Newkirk and animal rights activist Alex Pacheco, the organization first gained attention in the summer of 1981 during what became known as the Silver Spring monkeys case. The organization opposes factory farming, fur farming, animal testing, and other activities it considers to be exploitation of animals. (Note: Some of the examples include eating meat, fishing, the killing of animals regarded as pests, the keeping of chained backyard dogs, cock fighting, dog fighting, beekeeping, hunting, animal testing, cruelty to pets, guide dogs, zoos, and bullfighting.)

The organization's controversial campaigns have been credited with drawing media attention to animal rights issues, but have also been widely criticized for their disruptive nature. Its use of euthanasia has resulted in legal action and a response from Virginia lawmakers.

== History ==
=== Ingrid Newkirk ===
Ingrid Newkirk co-founded PETA with Alex Pacheco in March 1980. Inspired by Peter Singer's 1975 book, Animal Liberation, Newkirk persuaded Pacheco to join her in forming the organization, at that point just "five people in a basement", as Newkirk described it. They were mostly students and members of the local vegetarian society, but the group included a friend of Pacheco's from the UK, Kim Stallwood, a British activist who went on to become the national organizer of the British Union for the Abolition of Vivisection.

=== Silver Spring monkeys ===
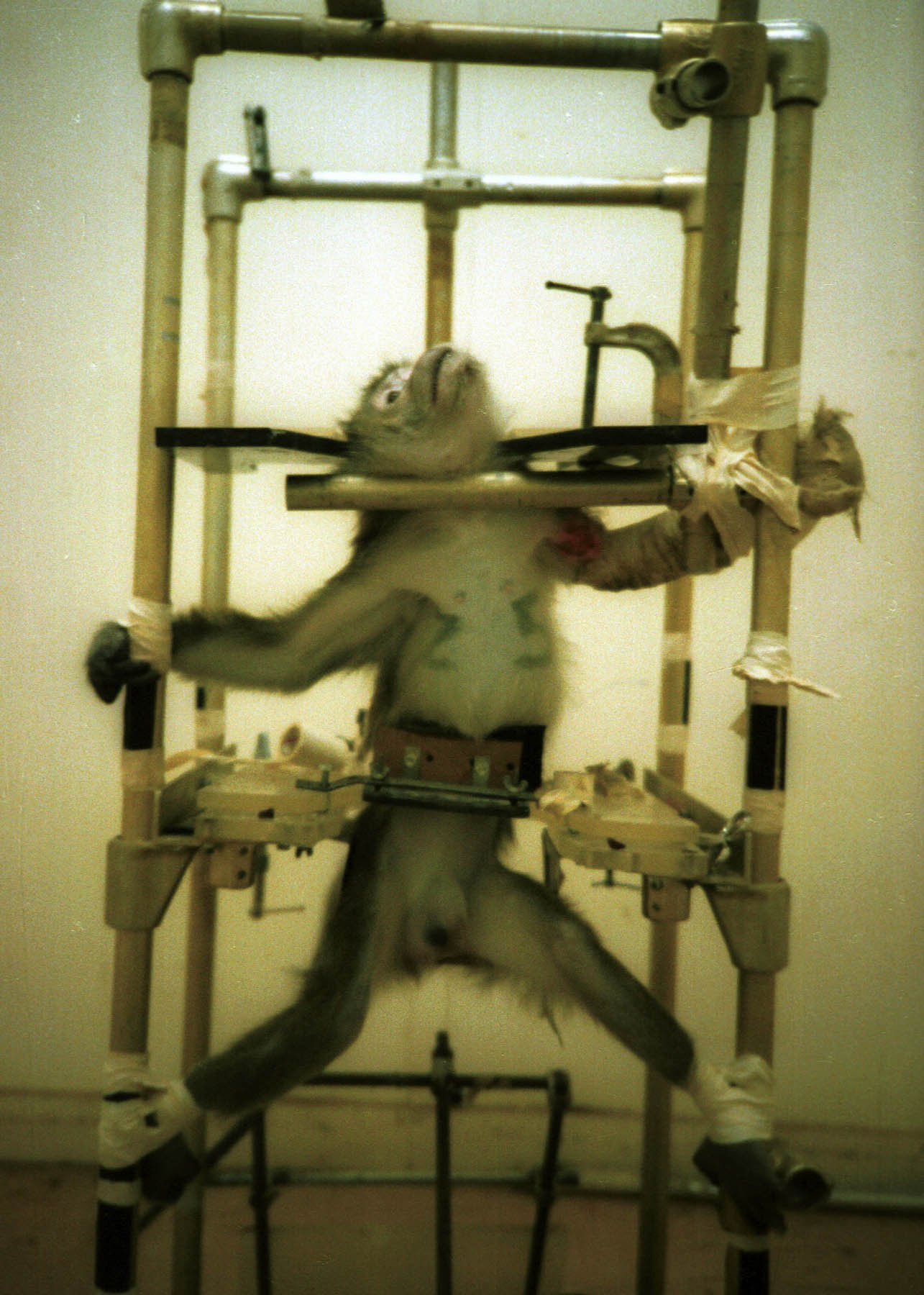
PETA distributed images of the monkeys with the caption, "This is vivisection. Don't let anyone tell you different."

The group first came to public attention in 1981 during the Silver Spring monkeys case, a dispute about experiments conducted by researcher Edward Taub on 17 macaque monkeys inside the Institute of Behavioral Research in Silver Spring, Maryland. The case led to the first police raid in the United States on an animal laboratory, triggered an amendment in 1985 to the United States Animal Welfare Act, and became the first animal-testing case to be appealed to the United States Supreme Court, which upheld a Louisiana State Court ruling that denied PETA's request for custody of the monkeys.

Pacheco had taken a job in May 1981 inside a primate research laboratory at the institute, intending to gain firsthand experience of working inside an animal laboratory. Taub had been cutting sensory ganglia that supplied nerves to the monkeys' fingers, hands, arms, and legs—a process called "deafferentation"—so that the monkeys could not feel them; some of the monkeys had had their entire spinal columns deafferented. He then used restraint, electric shock, and withholding of food and water to force the monkeys to use the deafferented parts of their bodies. The research led in part to the discovery of neuroplasticity and a new therapy for stroke victims called constraint-induced movement therapy.

Pacheco went to the laboratory at night, taking photographs that showed the monkeys living in what the Institute for Laboratory Animal Research's ILAR Journal called "filthy conditions". He passed his photographs to the police, who raided the lab and arrested Taub. Taub was convicted of six counts of cruelty to animals, the first such conviction in the United States of an animal researcher; the conviction, though, was overturned on appeal. Norm Phelps writes that the case followed the highly publicized campaign of Henry Spira in 1976 against experiments on cats being performed at the American Museum of Natural History in New York and Spira's subsequent campaign in April 1980 against the Draize test. These and the Silver Spring monkey case jointly put animal rights on the agenda in the United States.

The 10-year battle for custody of the monkeys—described by The Washington Post as a vicious mud fight, during which both sides accused the other of lies and distortion— transformed PETA into a national, then international, movement. By February 1991, it claimed over 350,000 supporters, a paid staff of over 100, and an annual budget of over $7 million.

=== Locations ===
PETA was based in Rockville, Maryland, until 1996, when it moved to Norfolk, Virginia. It opened a Los Angeles division in 2006 and also has offices in Washington, D.C., and Oakland, California.

PETA has international affiliates including PETA India (Mumbai), PETA Asia-Pacific (Manila, Philippines), and PETA UK.

== Philosophy and activism ==
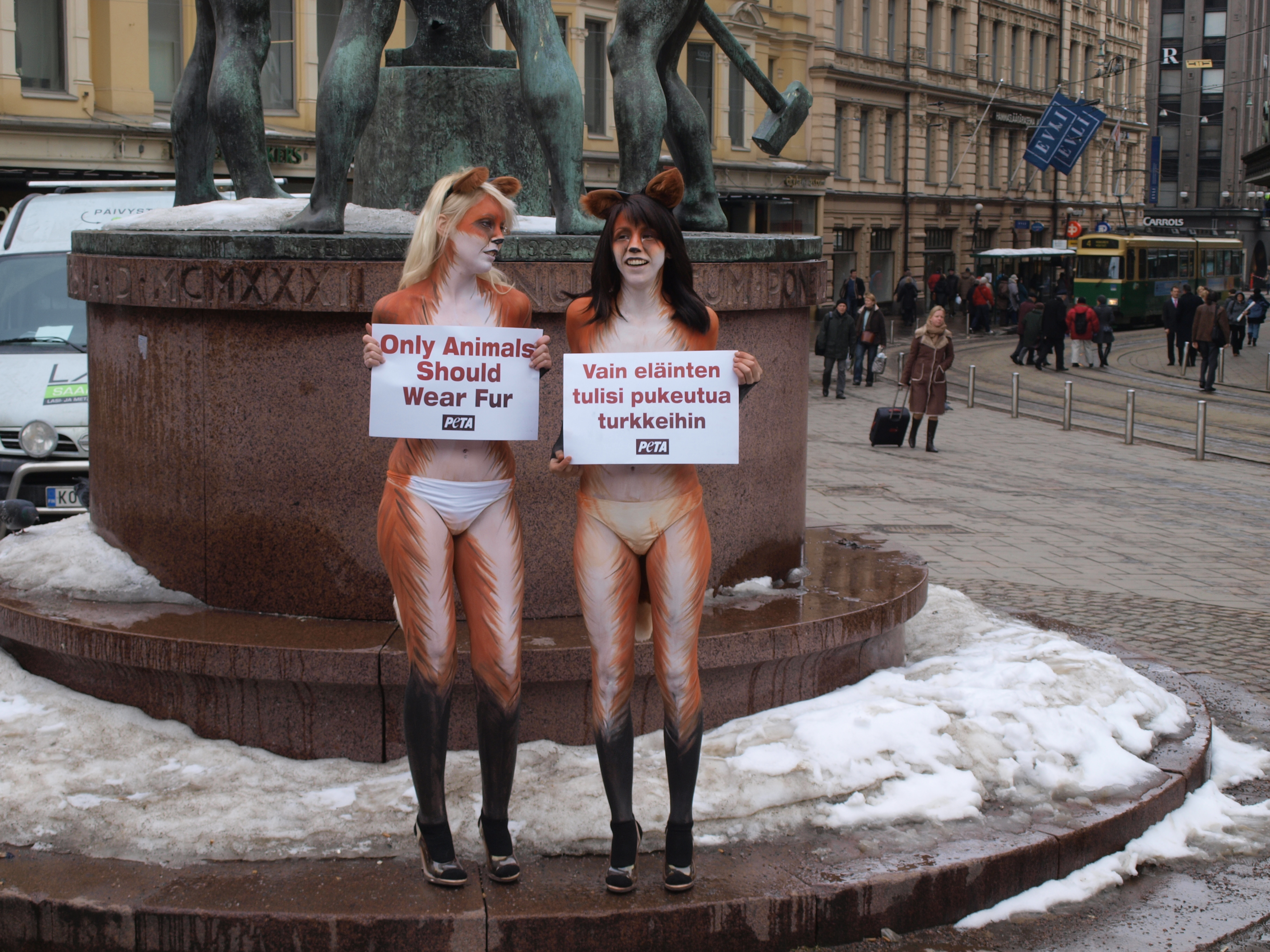
Two young women from PETA, body painted to look like foxes, protesting against the fur trade next to the Three Smiths Statue in Helsinki, Finland on March 25, 2010

=== Profile ===
PETA is an animal rights organization that opposes speciesism, and the abuse of animals in any way, such as for food, clothing, entertainment, or research.

In 2025, PETA's website claimed they had 10.5 million supporters, and received donations of $80 million for 2024.

=== Campaigns and consumer boycotts ===
The organization is known for aggressive media stunts, combined with a solid base of celebrity support—in addition to its honorary directors, Paul McCartney, Alicia Silverstone, Eva Mendes, Charlize Theron, Ellen DeGeneres, and many other notable celebrities have appeared in PETA ads. Every week, Newkirk holds what The New Yorker calls a "war council", with two dozen of her top strategists gathered at a square table in the PETA conference room, with no suggestion considered too "kooky or unkind". PETA also gives an annual prize, called the Proggy Award (for "progress"), to individuals or organizations dedicated to animal welfare or who distinguish themselves through their efforts within the area of animal welfare.

Many of the campaigns have focused on large corporations. Fast food companies such as KFC, Wendy's, and Burger King have been targeted. In the animal-testing industry, PETA's consumer boycotts have focused on Avon, Benetton, Bristol-Myers-Squibb, Pond's, Dow Chemical, General Motors, and others. The group's modus operandi includes buying shares in target companies such as McDonald's and Kraft Foods to exert influence. The campaigns have delivered results for PETA. McDonald's and Wendy's introduced vegetarian options after PETA targeted them; and Polo Ralph Lauren said it would no longer use fur. Avon, Estée Lauder, Benetton, and Tonka Toy Co. all stopped testing products on animals, the Pentagon stopped shooting pigs and goats in wounds tests, and a slaughterhouse in Texas was closed down.

As part of its anti-fur action, PETA supporters have infiltrated hundreds of fashion shows in the U.S. and Europe and one in China, throwing red paint on the catwalks and unfurling banners. Celebrities and supermodels have posed naked for the group's "I'd Rather Go Naked Than Wear Fur" campaign—some men, but mostly women—triggering criticism from some feminist animal rights advocates. The New Yorker writes that PETA activists have crawled through the streets of Paris wearing leg-hold traps and thrown around money soaked in fake blood at the International Fur Fair. They sometimes engage in pie-throwing—in January 2010, Canadian MP Gerry Byrne compared them to terrorists for throwing a tofu cream pie at Canada's fishery minister Gail Shea in protest of the seal slaughter, a comment Newkirk called a silly chest-beating exercise. "The thing is, we make them gawk" she told Satya magazine, "maybe like a traffic accident that you have to look at."

PETA has also objected to the practice of mulesing (removing strips of wool-bearing skin from around the buttocks of a sheep). In October 2004, PETA launched a boycott against the Australian wool industry, leading some clothing retailers to ban products using Australian wool from their stores. In response, the Australian wool industry sued PETA, arguing among other things that mulesing prevents flystrike, a very painful disease that can affect sheep. A settlement was reached, and PETA agreed to stop the boycott, while the wool industry agreed to seek alternatives to mulesing.

In 2011, PETA named five orcas as plaintiffs and sued SeaWorld over the animals' captivity, seeking their protection under the Thirteenth Amendment. A federal judge heard the case and dismissed it in early 2012. In August 2014, SeaWorld announced it was building new orca tanks that would almost double the size of the existing ones to provide more space for its whales. PETA responded that a "larger prison is still a prison." In 2016, SeaWorld admitted that it had been sending its employees to pose as activists to spy on PETA. Following an investigation by an outside law firm, SeaWorld's Board of Directors directed management to end the practice.

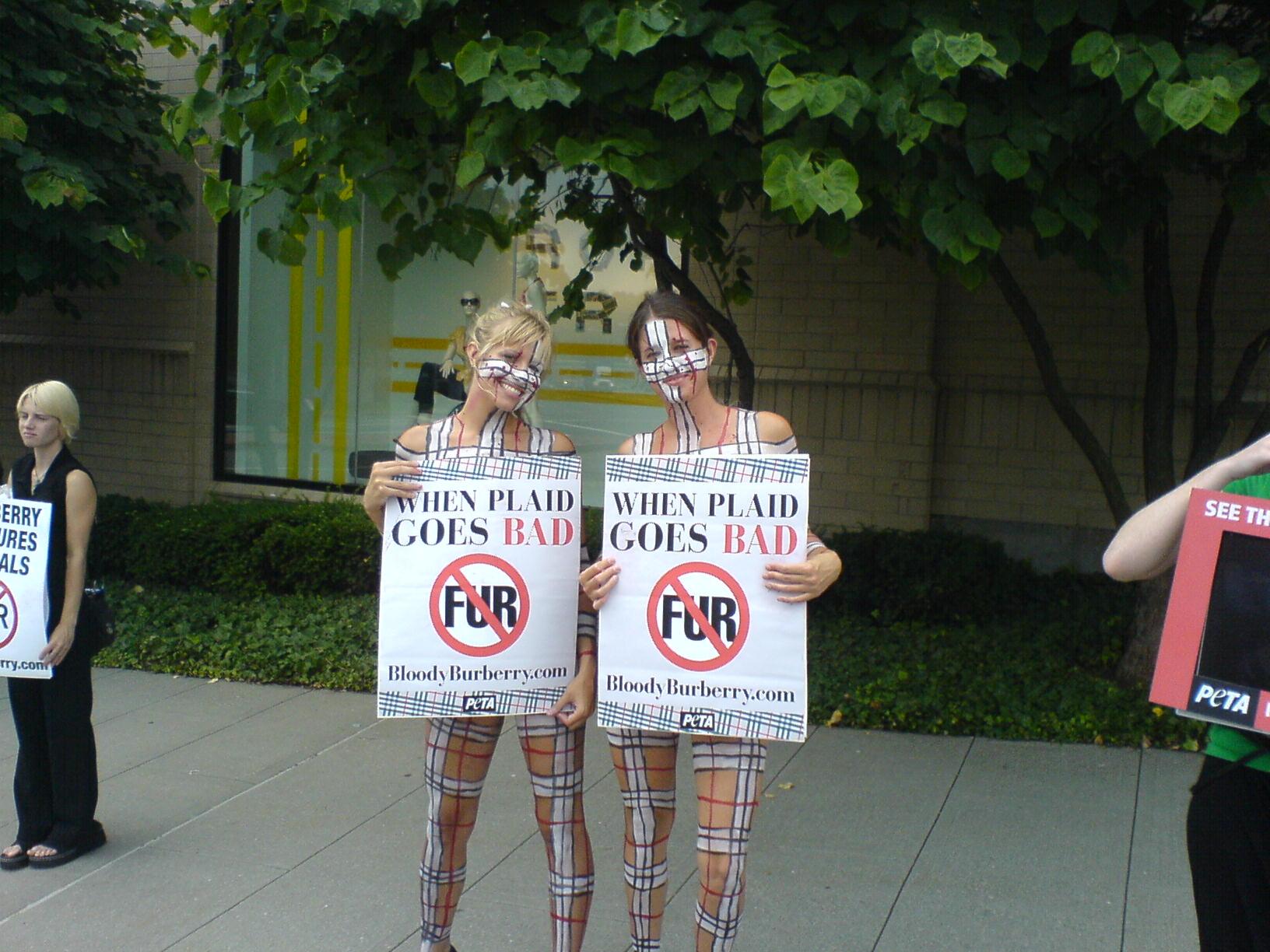
PETA supporters campaign against Burberry in an anti-fur protest in 2007

In 2011, Patricia de Leon was the Hispanic spokesperson for PETA's anti-bullfighting campaign.

Some campaigns have been particularly controversial. Newkirk was criticized in 2003 for sending a letter to Palestine Liberation Organization leader Yasser Arafat asking him to keep animals out of the conflict, after a donkey was blown up during an attack in Jerusalem.

To reduce milk consumption, it created the "Got Beer?" campaign, a parody of the dairy industry's series of Got Milk? ads, which featured celebrities with milk "mustaches" on their upper lips. When the mayor of New York, Rudy Giuliani, was diagnosed with prostate cancer in 2000, PETA ran a photograph of him with a white mustache and the words "Got prostate cancer?" to illustrate their claim that dairy products contribute to cancer, an ad that caused an outcry in the United States. After PETA placed ads in school newspapers linking milk to acne, obesity, heart disease, cancer, and strokes, Mothers Against Drunk Driving and college officials complained it encouraged underage drinking; the British Advertising Standards Authority asked that the ads be discontinued after complaints from interest groups such as The National Farmers' Unions.

In August 2011, it was announced that PETA will be launching a soft pornography website in the .xxx domain. PETA spokesperson Lindsay Rajt told the Huffington Post, "We try to use absolutely every outlet to stick up for animals", adding that "We are careful about what we do and wouldn't use nudity or some of our flashier tactics if we didn't know they worked." PETA also used nudity in its "Veggie Love" ad which it prepared for the Super Bowl, only to have it banned by the network. PETA's work has drawn the ire of some feminists who argue that the organization sacrifices women's rights to press its agenda. Lindsay Beyerstein criticized PETA saying "They're the ones drawing disturbing analogies between pornography, misogyny and animal cruelty."

PETA has approached cities to pressure them to change their names, including Fishkill, New York in 1996, Hamburg, New York in 2003, and Commerce City, Colorado in 2007.

PETA sometimes issues isolated statements or press releases, commenting on current events. After Lady Gaga wore a dress made of meat in 2010, PETA issued a statement objecting to the dress. After a fisherman in Florida was bitten by a shark in 2011, PETA proposed an advertisement showing a shark devouring a human, with the caption "Payback Is Hell, Go Vegan". The proposed ad drew criticism from relatives of the injured fisherman. After Minnesota dentist Walter Palmer admitted that he had killed Cecil the lion in Zimbabwe in 2015, PETA's president, Newkirk, issued a statement on behalf of PETA in which she said:

Hunting is a coward's pastime. If, as has been reported, this dentist and his guides lured Cecil out of the park with food so as to shoot him on private property, because shooting him in the park would have been illegal, he needs to be extradited, charged, and, preferably, hanged.

=== Undercover work ===
PETA sends its staff undercover into industries and other facilities that use animals to document the alleged abuse of animals. Investigators may spend many months as employees of a facility, making copies of documents and wearing hidden cameras.

==== 1980s ====
- In 1984, PETA produced a 26-minute film, Unnecessary Fuss, based on 60 hours of research video footage stolen by the Animal Liberation Front during a break-in at the University of Pennsylvania's head injury clinic. The footage showed experiments on the baboons with a hydraulic device intended to simulate whiplash. The publicity led to investigations, suspension of grant funding, the firing of a veterinarian, the closure of the research lab, and a period of probation for the university.

==== 1990s ====
- In 1990, two PETA activists posed as employees of Carolina Biological, where they took pictures and video footage inside the company, alleging that cats were being mistreated. Following the release of PETA's tapes, the US Department of Agriculture (USDA) conducted its own inspection and subsequently charged the company with seven violations of the Animal Welfare Act. Four years later, an administrative judge ruled that Carolina Biological had not committed any violations.
- In 1990, Bobby Berosini, a Las Vegas entertainer, lost his wildlife license as well as (on appeal) a later lawsuit against PETA, after PETA broadcast an undercover film of him slapping and punching orangutans in 1989.
- In 1997, PETA made a film which aired on television from footage obtained by PETA member Michele Rokke, who went undercover to report on UK company Huntingdon Life Sciences. Huntingdon sued PETA, and PETA agreed to drop its campaign against Huntingdon.
- In 1999, a North Carolina grand jury indicted three workers at a hog farm after three-months of videotaping by a PETA operative while he was employed at the farm. The veterinarian who oversaw the farm said the video PETA had made from the footage was a distortion and was made by someone who "lied during his employment interview".

==== 2000s ====
- In 2004, PETA released video tapes taken from eight months of undercover filming in a West Virginia slaughterhouse that supplies chicken to the fast food industry. The recordings showed workers stomping on live chickens and throwing dozens against a wall. The parent corporation sent in their inspectors and told the plant to take corrective measures or risk losing their contract. Eleven employees were fired and the company introduced an anti-cruelty pledge for workers to sign.
- For 11 months PETA shot footage inside a facility in Virginia operated by Covance (now Fortrea). Alleging that the footage showed primates being choked, hit, and denied medical attention, PETA sent the video and a 253-page complaint to the USDA. The department investigated and the company was fined $8,720. In June 2005, the company filed a lawsuit against PETA and the investigator for fraud, breach of employee contract, and conspiracy. PETA agreed to hand over all video footage and written notes to the company, and agreed to a ban on conducting any infiltration of the company for five years.
- In 2006, PETA filmed a trainer at Carson & Barnes Circus instructing others to beat the elephants to make them obey. A company spokesman said they stopped using electrical prods on animals after the video was released.
- In 2007, the owners of a chinchilla ranch in Michigan sued PETA after it pretended in 2004 to be an interested buyer and secretly filming them, creating a video "Nightmare on Chinchilla Farm". A judge dismissed the case, writing "Undercover investigations are one of the main ways our criminal justice system operates", and noted that investigative television shows "often conduct undercover investigations to reveal improper, unethical, or criminal behavior."
- In 2008, the famous Spanish singer Alaska collaborated with PETA in a joint campaign with AnimaNaturalis, posing nude in a picture to raise awareness for what she considers cruel activity – bullfighting.

==== 2010s ====
- In 2013, PETA investigated angora rabbit farms in China and released video footage showing farmers ripping out the wool from live rabbits while they screamed. In 2015, Inditex announced they would discontinue their use of angora and donated their existing inventory to Syrian refugees. Seventy other retailers had also stopped selling angora wool since the release of PETA's graphic video footage.
- Between 2012 and 2014, PETA investigated sheep shearing sheds in the wool industry in Australia and the US. PETA sent reports and film footage to local authorities alleging that shearers had kicked and beat sheep, stomped on their heads, necks and legs, punched them with clippers, slammed them onto the floor, and sewed up cuts without pain relief. An American Wool Council spokesperson said "We do not condone or support the actions of anyone that results in the abuse of sheep either intentionally or unintentionally. Rough handling of animals that might result in the injury of a sheep is an unacceptable maneuver during the shearing process or anytime when sheep are handled."
- In 2014, PETA conducted an undercover investigation of the horse-racing industry, filming seven hours of footage that, as The New York Times reported, "showed mistreatment of the horses to be widespread and cavalier." Noted trainer Steve Asmussen and his top assistant trainer, Scott Blasi, were accused "of subjecting their horses to cruel and injurious treatments, administering drugs to them for nontherapeutic purposes, and having one of their jockeys use an electrical device to shock horses into running faster." The newspaper noted that this investigation "was PETA's first significant step into advocacy in the horse racing world." In November 2015, as a result of PETA's investigation, Asmussen was fined $10,000 by the New York State Gaming Commission. Robert Williams, executive director of the commission, said, "We recognize PETA for playing a role in bringing about changes necessary to make thoroughbred racing safer and fairer for all." While the fine from the New York State Gaming Commission was for a minor transgression, the most serious charges were deemed unfounded. By contrast, the Kentucky Horse Racing Commission, which also received PETA's allegations, found that Asmussen did not violate any of its rules. After a thorough investigation, the Kentucky Horse Racing Commission did not bring any charges against Asmussen, stating the allegations "had neither a factual or scientific basis."
- In 2015, as The Washington Post reported, PETA investigated Sweet Stem Farm, a pig farm that supplies meat to Whole Foods. The resulting video footage "featured images of pigs, some allegedly sick and not given appropriate care, crowded into hot pens and roughly handled by employees", contradicting both the farm's own video self-portrait and Whole Foods' claims about "humane meat" (a term that PETA maintains is an oxymoron). The Post notes that "[i]n the wake of the PETA investigation, Whole Foods has removed the Sweet Stem video from its Web site." PETA subsequently filed a class-action lawsuit against Whole Foods, "alleging that the chain's claims about animal welfare amount to a 'sham'". The lawsuit was dismissed by a federal magistrate, who ruled that the store's signage "amounted to permissible 'puffery'" and that "the statement that 'no cages' were used to raise broiler chickens was not misleading merely because Whole Foods failed to also disclose that poultry suppliers normally do not use cages in the first place."
- Other PETA investigations from around this time focused on crocodile and alligator farms in Texas and Zimbabwe, a monkey breeding facility in Florida, pigeon racing in Taiwan, ostrich slaughterhouses and tanneries in South Africa.
- CBS News reported in November 2016 that PETA had captured footage from restaurants that serve live octopus, shrimp, and other marine animals. The group's video showed "an octopus writhing as its limbs are severed by a chef at T Equals Fish, a Koreatown sushi restaurant in Los Angeles." PETA noted that octopuses "are considered among the most intelligent invertebrates" and "are capable of feeling pain just as a pig or rabbit would."
- In December 2016, PETA released video footage from an investigation at Texas A&M University's dog laboratory, which deliberately breeds dogs to contract muscular dystrophy. PETA claims that for "35 years, dogs have suffered in cruel muscular dystrophy experiments ... which haven't resulted in a cure or treatment for reversing the course of muscular dystrophy in humans." The Houston Press noted that "Texas A&M has been less than transparent about the research, and in some cases has denied that the dogs experience pain or discomfort." Among other efforts, PETA placed a billboard to oppose the ineffectual research on animals.
- Bio Corporation, a company that supplies dead animals for study and dissection, was the subject of a November 2017 PETA undercover investigation. It was claimed that video footage showed workers at the company's facility in Alexandria, Minnesota "drowning fully-conscious pigeons, injecting live crayfish with latex and claiming that they sometimes would freeze turtles to death." PETA brought 25 charges of cruelty to animals against the company. Drowning is not considered an acceptable form of euthanasia, according to the American Veterinary Medical Association, and its standards of humane euthanasia must be followed by companies certified by the United States Department of Agriculture such as Bio Corporation. On April 18, 2018, the case was dismissed and all charges dropped based on the Alexandria City Attorney's Office's assessment that the allegations of cruelty against either pigeons or crayfish were not sufficiently supported. Daniel Paden, PETA's director of evidence analysis, said that PETA is "reviewing its options to protect animals killed at Bio Corporation."
- In 2018, police raided a PetSmart store in Tennessee, after receiving video footage from PETA. Police confiscated six animals: a guinea pig, mice, and hamsters. PetSmart sued the ex-employee, Jenna Jordan, claiming she was a paid PETA operative who obtained employment at PetSmart stores in Arizona, Florida and Tennessee to obtain recordings which she provided to PETA. Jordan was accused of committing "animal neglect, theft of confidential information, unlawfully surveilled private conversations, and filing false reports with law enforcement under false pretenses in three states." In 2019, PetSmart added PETA as a defendant in the lawsuit.
- On May 1, 2018, PETA released an investigation of the mohair industry that led more than 80 retailers, including UNIQLO and Zappos, to drop products made with mohair. The video evidence "depicts goats being thrown around wood floors, dunked in poisonous cleaning solution or having their ears mutilated with pliers. ... [E]mployees are shown cutting goats' throats, breaking their necks, electrically shocking them and beheading them."

=== Ag-gag laws ===
Various U.S. states have passed ag-gag laws to prevent animal rights and animal welfare groups from conducting undercover investigations of operations that use animals. In response, PETA has been involved with other groups bringing lawsuits, citing First Amendment protections for free speech.

- In 2017, a federal judge ruled Utah's ag-gag law an unconstitutional violation of the First Amendment in a case brought against the state by PETA, the Animal Legal Defense Fund, and Amy Meyer, the director of the Utah Animal Rights Coalition.
- In 2018, Idaho's ag-gag law was struck down as unconstitutional in a case brought by ACLU-Idaho, the ALDF and PETA.
- In 2019, a federal judge struck down Iowa's 2012 ag-gag law in a case filed in 2017 by co-plaintiffs PETA, ALDF, ACLU-Iowa, Iowa Citizens for Community Improvement, Bailing Out Benji, and Center for Food Safety.
- In 2020, in the case of PETA et al v. Stein, Judge Schroeder struck four subsections of North Carolina's 2015 Property Protection Act, writing "the law is declared unconstitutional as applied to them in their exercise of speech." The plaintiffs included PETA, Center for Food Safety, ALDF, Farm Sanctuary, Food & Water Watch, Government Accountability Project, Farm Forward, and the ASPCA.

=== Legal proceedings ===
Two PETA employees were acquitted in 2007 of cruelty to animals after at least 80 euthanized animals were left in dumpsters in a shopping center in Ahoskie, North Carolina, over the course of a month in 2005; the two employees were seen leaving behind 18 dead animals, and 13 more were found inside their van. The animals had been euthanized after being removed from shelters in Northampton and Bertie counties. A Bertie County Deputy Sheriff stated that the two employees assured the Bertie Animal Shelter that "they were picking up the dogs to take them back to Norfolk where they would find them good homes." During the trial, Daphna Nachminovitch, the supervisor of PETA's Community Animal Project, said PETA began euthanizing animals in some rural North Carolina shelters after it found the shelters killing animals in ways PETA considers inhumane, including by shooting them. She also stated that the dumping of animals did not follow PETA's policy.

In November 2014, a resident of Accomack County, Virginia, produced video evidence that two workers in a van marked with a PETA logo had entered his property in a trailer park and taken his dog, who was then euthanized. He reported the incident to the police, who identified and charged two PETA workers, but the charges were later dropped by the commonwealth attorney on the grounds that it was not possible to prove criminal intent. The trailer park's manager had contacted PETA after a group of residents moved out, leaving their dogs behind, which is why the workers were on the property. The state later determined that PETA had violated state law by failing to ensure that the Chihuahua, who was not wearing a collar or tag, was properly identified and for failing to keep the dog alive for five days before euthanizing the animal. Citing a "severity of this lapse in judgment", the Virginia Department of Agriculture and Consumer Services issued PETA a first-ever violation and imposed a $500 fine. The contract worker who had taken the dog was dismissed by PETA.

In 2015, PETA sued British nature photographer David Slater in US court as a next friend for a wild macaque monkey, whom they named Naruto. PETA argued that the monkey was entitled to the copyright of a selfie it had taken while handling Slater's camera, and naming themselves to be the administrator of any copyright revenue. The monkey selfie copyright dispute was originally dismissed by Judge Orrick who wrote there is no indication that the Copyright Act extends to animals and a monkey could not own a copyright. PETA appealed, but the Court of Appeals found in favor of Slater saying that "PETA's real motivation in this case was to advance its own interests, not Naruto's." The decision cited Cetacean v. Bush (2004) that says animals cannot sue unless Congress makes it clear in the statute that animals can sue, and added that "next friend" representation cannot be applied to animals. The court also wrote:

"Puzzlingly, while representing to the world that 'animals are not ours to eat, wear, experiment on, use for entertainment, or abuse in any other way,' PETA seems to employ Naruto as an unwitting pawn in its ideological goals."

=== Video games ===
Screenshot of Super Chick Sisters, one of PETA's games relating to KFC

PETA has released a number of browser games on its website that have parodied existing video games. Some of PETA's earliest forays into gaming include Flash-based games such as Make Fred Spew (2001) and Save the Chicks (2003), which were included as part of PETA's anti-dairy and Kentucky Fried Cruelty campaigns. These games received some coverage in academic and news sources. It was not until 2007 that PETA began to attract wider attention within the gaming community with its release of Super Chick Sisters, a parody of New Super Mario Bros. and Super Mario Galaxy.

Selected PETA video game parodies that have received press coverage include:

- Super Chick Sisters (2007) – New Super Mario Bros. and Super Mario Galaxy
- Cooking Mama: Mama Kills Animals (2008) – Cooking Mama: World Kitchen
- New Super Chick Sisters (2009) – New Super Mario Bros. Wii
- Super Tofu Boy (2010) – Super Meat Boy
- Super Tanooki Skin 2D (2011) – Super Mario 3D Land
- Pokémon Black and Blue (2012) – Pokémon Black 2 and White 2
- Cage Fight: Knock Out Animal Abuse (2013) – River City Ransom
- Pokémon Red, White, and Blue: An Unofficial PETA Parody (2013) – Pokémon X and Y

=== Person of the year ===
Each year, PETA selects a "Person of the Year" who has helped advance the cause of animal rights.

- 2006: Eric Ryan and Adam Lowry (founders of Method Products).
- 2007: Robert C. Byrd (for his passionate defense of animals throughout six decades of public service).
- 2008: Oprah Winfrey (for using her powerful voice to defend those without one).
- 2009: Tim Gunn (Man of the Year) and Ellen DeGeneres (Woman of the Year).
- 2010: Bill Clinton (for his influence to promote the benefits of following a vegan diet).
- 2011: Russell Simmons (for tirelessly advocating for animals and setting a positive example for others by promoting a vegan lifestyle).
- 2012: Anjelica Huston. (for her work to keep animals with their families in the habitats where they belong, instead of being used on production sets and fur farms and to pull carriages).
- 2013: Ricky Gervais.
- 2014: Bill de Blasio. (for his defense of tigers, elephants, and horses forced to work in New York and his promotion of vegan eating).
- 2015: Pope Francis (selected for his encouragement to treat animals with kindness and to respect the environment).
- 2016: Mary Matalin (chosen for her fight for the humane treatment of farm animals and monkeys).
- 2017: Naruto (a monkey unaware of his role in a copyright case).
- 2018: California Wildfire Heroes.
- 2019: Joaquin Phoenix.
- 2020: Tabitha Brown.
- 2021: Billie Eilish.
- 2022: James Cromwell (for speaking out against the live export of pigs from Ireland, and pressuring Starbucks to end its vegan milk up-charge).
- 2023: James Gunn
- 2024: Stella McCartney
- 2025: Jane Goodall

==== PETA India ====
- 2011: Hema Malini (for taking a stand and speaking out for animals).
- 2012: R. Madhavan (for helping make the world a better place for animals).
- 2013: Shashi Tharoor.
- 2014: K. S. Panicker Radhakrishnan (Man of the year for a landmark judgement banning Jallikattu) and Jacqueline Fernandez (Woman of the year).
- 2015: Kapil Sharma (for his dedication in championing the adoption of dogs from animal shelters or the streets).
- 2016: Sunny Leone (for advocating the support of vegan fashion, vegetarianism, and cat & dog adoption / sterilisation).
- 2017: Anushka Sharma (for her wide-reaching work for animals, from helping to protect dogs from fireworks to advocating for horses who are forced to pull carriages).
- 2018: Sonam Kapoor.
- 2019: Virat Kohli.
- 2020: John Abraham.
- 2021: Alia Bhatt (for her continuous work in support of an animal-friendly fashion industry).
- 2022: Sonakshi Sinha. (for action which helped spare the lives of animals killed for fashion, and her strong advocacy for cats and dogs in need).

==== PETA UK ====
- 2008: Leona Lewis. (for her campaign against foie gras).
- 2009: Roger Moore.
- 2010: Pamela Anderson.
- 2011: Morrissey.
- 2012: Brian May (for badger activism).
- 2014: Tony Benn.
- 2016: Pamela Anderson.
- 2017: Roger Moore.
- 2018: Lewis Hamilton.
- 2020: Carrie Johnson (for her work to protect endangered animals).
- 2023: Paul O'Grady (for his lifelong determination to make the world a kinder place for animals).

== Positions ==
=== Direct action ===
Newkirk is outspoken in her support of direct action, writing that no movement for social change has ever succeeded without what she calls the militarism component: "Thinkers may prepare revolutions, but bandits must carry them out." Newkirk is a strong supporter of direct action that removes animals from laboratories and other facilities: "When I hear of anyone walking into a lab and walking out with animals, my heart sings." Newkirk was quoted in 1999, "When you see the resistance to basic humane treatment and to the acknowledgment of animals' social needs, I find it small wonder that the laboratories aren't all burning to the ground. If I had more guts, I'd light a match."

=== Euthanasia ===
PETA is a strong proponent of euthanasia for unwanted and abandoned pets, which it describes as a necessary evil. PETA opposes the no-kill movement, aiming for zero births through spaying and neutering rather than focusing on adoption programs. They recommend not breeding pit bulls, and support euthanasia in certain situations for animals in shelters, such as those being housed for long periods in cramped cages.

PETA's euthanasia practices have drawn intense scrutiny from lawmakers and criticism from animal rights activists for years. The consistently high percentage of animals euthanized at PETA's shelter has been controversial.

In 2008, meat industry lobby group the Center for Consumer Freedom (CCF) said in a news release that "[a]n official report filed by PETA itself shows that the animal rights group put to death nearly every dog, cat, and other pet it took in for adoption in 2006", with a kill rate of 97.4 percent. In 2012, the Virginia Department of Agriculture and Consumer Services said that it had in the past considered changing PETA's status from "shelter" to "euthanasia clinic", citing PETA's willingness to take in "anything that comes through the door, and other shelters won't do that." PETA acknowledged that it euthanized 95% of the animals at its shelter in 2011.

PETA calls their shelter in Norfolk, Virginia a "shelter of last resort", claiming they only receive old, sick, injured, badly behaved, and otherwise unadoptable animals. Operating as open admission, they take in animals "no one else will", and consider death "a merciful end". In 2014, PETA euthanized over 80% of the shelter's animals and justified its euthanasia policies as "mercy killings". The Virginia General Assembly passed Senate Bill 1381 in 2015 aimed at curtailing the operation of PETA's shelter. The bill was filed in response to public outcry following an incident where PETA euthanized a pet chihuahua and reports of the large number of animals killed each year.

Though risking their legal access to euthanasia drugs, PETA has continued their practices.

=== Pet as a derogatory term ===
PETA considers the word pet to be "derogatory and patronises the animal", and prefers the term "companion" or "companion animal". "Animals are not pets", Newkirk has said.

=== Hearing-ear and seeing-eye dogs ===
PETA supports hearing dog programs when animals are sourced from shelters and placed in homes, but opposes seeing-eye dog programs "because the dogs are bred as if there are no equally intelligent dogs literally dying for homes in shelters, they are kept in harnesses almost 24/7".

=== Animal testing ===
PETA opposes animal testing—whether toxicity testing, basic or applied research, or for education and training—on both moral and practical grounds. Newkirk told the Vogue magazine in 1989 that even if animal testing resulted in a cure for AIDS, PETA would oppose it. The group also believes that it is wasteful, unreliable, and irrelevant to human health, because artificially induced diseases in animals are not identical to human diseases. They say that animal experiments are frequently redundant and lack accountability, oversight, and regulation. They promote alternatives, including embryonic stem cell research and in vitro cell research.

=== National Institute of Allergy and Infectious Diseases/White Coat Waste Project ===
The White Coat Waste Project (WCWP), a group of activists that hold that taxpayers should not have to pay $20 billion every year for experiments on animals, said that the National Institute of Allergy and Infectious Diseases provided $400,000 in taxpayer money to fund experiments in which 28 beagles were infected by disease-causing parasites. The WCWP found reports that said dogs taking part in the experiments were "vocalizing in pain" after being injected with foreign substances. Following public outcry, PETA made a call to action that all members of the National Institute of Health (NIH) resign effective immediately and that there is a "need to find a new NIH director to replace the outgoing Francis Collins who will shut down research that violates the dignity of nonhuman animals." In 2019, the WCWP discovered a USDA funded lab in Beltsville, Maryland which conducted toxoplasmosis experiments on kittens resulting in the deaths of nearly 3,000 kittens over 36 years. This discovery led to the USDA banning all taxpayer funded kitten experiments. In 2024, the WCWP also reported that taxpayer money was used to fund beagle experiments in China, which drew widespread condemnation, including a call from PETA to end taxpayer-funded animal experiments globally.

== Controversies ==
=== High euthanasia rates ===
PETA has drawn controversy for its high euthanasia rates.

=== Child targeted messaging ===
PETA has also been criticized for aiming its message at young people. In the past, it has passed out pamphlets such as "Your Daddy Kills Animals", and "Your Mommy Kills Animals", both warning children from letting their "addicted to killing" parents have contact with their pets. The pamphlet was criticized by the Center for Consumer Freedom, who said "There's going to be long-term psychological damage from these kids being exposed to the material that PETA puts in front of them on a regular basis."

As part of its 1999 "McCruelty" campaign, PETA attempted to distribute "Unhappy Meals" to young audiences: a parody of McDonald's Happy Meal. When describing the box, they explained that "PETA's spoof of a McDonald's chicken sandwich box features the image of a knife-wielding Ronald McDonald, along with pictures of birds who have been mutilated and scalded alive. The inside of the Unhappy Meal box is stained with blood and contains a blood-filled packet urging McDonald's to "Ketchup With the Times", a paper cutout of a menacing Ronald McDonald with PETA's parody "I'm Hatin' It" logo, a bloody plastic chicken, and a "Chicken McCruelty" T-shirt wrapped up like a sandwich." The violent imagery was decried by parents who stated "I don't want my son to be around something like this." As part of the same campaign, PETA attempted to place a large statue of a crippled, scalded chicken in front of a McDonalds's in Little Rock, but were denied, and released a short comic book titled Ronald McDonald Kills Animals, in which Ronald McDonald, Grimace, and the Hamburglar unite to kill Birdie's parents, feed them to her unknowingly, then eat her as well.

A similar "Kentucky Fried Cruelty" campaign occurred in 2004, when PETA criticized KFC and distributed "Buckets of Blood" to children: the buckets (meant to mimic KFC's buckets of chicken) included a bag of fake blood, feathers, and bones; a bloody plastic chicken; and a cardboard caricature of a blood-spattered Colonel Sanders holding a butcher knife toward a terrified-looking chicken.

A 2013 ad titled Traditional Thanksgiving Dinner from your Family Butcher, was developed using lenticular technology to show parents a benign Thanksgiving promo, but show their children a mother stabbing a live turkey while her children look on in shock.

=== "It's Still Going On" campaign ===
PETA's "It's Still Going On" campaign features newspaper ads comparing widely publicized murder-cannibalization cases to the deaths of animals in slaughterhouses. The campaign has attracted significant media attention, controversy and generated angry responses from the victims' family members. Ads were released in 1991 describing the deaths of the victims of serial killer Jeffrey Dahmer, in 2002 describing the deaths of the victims of serial killer Robert William Pickton, and in 2008 describing the killing of Tim McLean. In several cases, newspapers have refused to run the ads.

=== "Holocaust on your Plate" campaign ===
In 2003, PETA composed the "Holocaust on Your Plate" exhibition—eight 60-square-foot (5.6 m^{2}) panels juxtaposing images of Holocaust and concentration camp victims with scenes of factory farming, battery cages, animal carcasses and animals being transported to slaughter, along with captions stating that "Like the Jews murdered in concentration camps, animals are terrorized when they are housed in huge filthy warehouses and rounded up for shipment to slaughter. The leather sofa and handbag are the moral equivalent of the lampshades made from the skins of people killed in the death camps." The campaign was widely criticized.

=== "Are Animals the New Slaves?" exhibit ===
In 2005, the NAACP criticized the "Are Animals the New Slaves?" exhibit, which showed images of African-American victims of lynching and slaves, Native Americans, child laborers, and women, alongside chained elephants and slaughtered cows. Lee Hall, the then director of Friends of Animals, supported the criticism, stating that, "While African-Americans have been systematically degraded by being compared with nonhuman beings, are we to think that angry responses to the pairing of man and monkey were unanticipated?"

Vakiya Courtney, then executive director of America's Black Holocaust Museum, was outraged; images from the exhibit included one taken at the site of the attempted lynching of the museum founder James Cameron, and the successful lynching of his two friends. "How can you possibly compare the brutality that our ancestors experienced here, and the brutality that people like Dr. Cameron had to overcome, to animal cruelty?" Cameron, himself, had a similar response: "They may have treated us like animals back then, but there is no way we should be compared to animals today."

=== "Got Autism?" campaign ===
In 2008 and in 2014, PETA conducted an advertising campaign linking milk with autism. Their "Got Autism?" campaign, a play on words mocking the milk industry's Got Milk? ad campaign that began in 1993, stated "Studies have shown a link between cow's milk and autism." PETA also claimed milk was strongly linked to cancer, Crohn's disease, and other diseases. When pressed, PETA cited two scientific papers, one from 1995 and one from 2002 using very small samplings of children (36 and 20), and neither showed a correlation nor a causation between milk and autism. Newer studies from 2010 and 2014 came to the same conclusion. Despite having been corrected, in 2014, PETA's Executive Vice President confirmed their position, and additionally stated that dairy consumption contributes to asthma, chronic ear infection, constipation, iron deficiency, anemia, and cancer.

Steven Novella, a clinical neurologist and assistant professor at Yale University School of Medicine, wrote "This is clearly, in my opinion, a campaign of fear mongering based upon a gross distortion of the scientific evidence. The purpose is to advocate for a vegan diet, which fits [PETA's] ideological agenda. They are likely aware that it is easier to spread fears than to reassure with a careful analysis of the scientific evidence."

PETA's campaign has received backlash from the autism community. A 2008 PETA billboard was taken down by the Autistic Self Advocacy Network. In 2017, British food writer, journalist and hunger relief activist Jack Monroe, demanded PETA remove their recipes from their website "with immediate effect coz I wrote them with my autism". PETA removed their recipes, but did not remove the "Got Autism?" article from their website until 2021. It has been argued that the frowny face in the campaign image negatively stereotypes autistic people.

=== "KKK or AKC?" controversy ===
In 2009, PETA members dressed up in Ku Klux Klan (KKK) robes and protested at the Westminster Kennel Club Dog Show where they passed out brochures implying the Klan and American Kennel Club (AKC) have the same goal of "pure bloodlines". This protest was continued in the PETA video game KKK or AKC? Spot the Difference.

=== Criticism of Steve Irwin ===
PETA has been critical of Australian wildlife expert and zookeeper Steve Irwin. In 2006, when Irwin died, PETA Vice President Dan Mathews said Irwin had made a career out of antagonizing frightened wild animals. Australian Member of Parliament Bruce Scott called for PETA to apologize and said, "Isn't it interesting [...] how they want to treat animals ethically, but cannot even think for a minute whether or not their outlandish comments are ethical towards their fellow human beings."

In 2019, PETA criticized Google for creating a slideshow Google Doodle of Steve Irwin posthumously honoring his 57th birthday.

=== Anti-carnivore sex strike ===
In 2022, PETA's German division called for a sex strike in which women would refrain from sexual activities with men who ate meat, and also called for men who ate meat to be banned from procreating. When pressed on the ban, Laura Weyman-Jones (the Australian division's marketing manager) said that it was a "conversation starter", and not an actual request or threat. The organization did not reverse its position that meat consumption was a form of toxic masculinity, harmful to the environment, increased male impotency, and should be sin-taxed at an additional 41%.

=== Human barbecue stunt protest ===
During Holy Week in the Philippines, a PETA Asia member stripped down to her underwear and laid down on a grill to depict a "human barbecue" in front of Quiapo Church in Quiapo, Manila, calling Filipinos to abstain from eating meat year-round, not just during Lent. The stunt protest drew attention and controversy from churchgoers, and a complaint was filed by the church with the Manila Police District. No formal complaint was made, and as such, the members involved were eventually released.

=== Umamusume drawing ===
On December 10, 2025, PETA posted on social media a drawing of the Umamusume: Pretty Derby character Silence Suzuka breaking her leg, with the caption "If Umamusume: Pretty Derby were honest, your favorite horse girl doesn't get a comeback arc. One failed event, and the race is over forever. Just like what happened to the real Silence Suzuka", reflecting the death of the actual horse with the same name, intending viewers to support better treatment of race horses. In addition to backlash, the franchise's fans pointed out that the image violates Cygames's fan content guidelines, which prohibit works that infringe on their intellectual property, could discomfort the horse's owners, for profit, in violent situations, or intend to advocate a certain view.

== Domain name disputes ==
In February 1995, a parody website calling itself "People Eating Tasty Animals" registered the domain name "peta.org". PETA sued, claiming trademark violation, and won the suit in 2001; the domain is currently owned by PETA. While still engaged in legal proceedings over "peta.org", PETA themselves registered the domains "ringlingbrothers.com" and "voguemagazine.com", using the sites to accuse Ringling Brothers and Barnum & Bailey Circus and Vogue of animal cruelty. PETA later surrendered the domains under threat of similar legal action over trademark infringement.

== Position within the animal rights movement ==
The more radical activists say the group has lost touch with its grass-roots members, is soft on the idea of animal rights, that it should stop the use of media stunts and nudity in its campaigning, and stop "hogging the spotlight at the expense of its allies in the movement".

Robert Garner of the University of Leicester has written that PETA has shaken up the animal rights movement, setting up new groups and radicalizing old ones. According to reviews at Philanthropedia, "PETA paved the way for other national organizations to delve into what used to be controversial issues and are now more mainstream concerns." Michael Specter considers PETA to be the radical that helps the more mainstream message to succeed. (Note: "It has been argued many times that in any social movement there has to be somebody radical enough to alienate the mainstream—and to permit more moderate influences to prevail. For every Malcolm X there is a Martin Luther King Jr., and for every Andrea Dworkin there is a Gloria Steinem. Newkirk and PETA provide a similar dynamic for groups like the Humane Society of the United States, which is the biggest animal-welfare organization in the country and far more moderate than PETA. When I asked Newkirk why she didn't enter political campaigns for animal action and lobby more vigorously on Capitol Hill for her positions, she laughed: 'Are you kidding? Dear boy, we are the kiss of death. If we are involved, the legislation is automatically dead. We have members yelling at us, "Why are you not working on these issues?" But activists just beg us to stay the hell out.'")

Because of PETA's euthanasia rates at their "shelter of last resort", attorney Nathan Winograd, advocate for the No Kill movement, calls Newkirk of PETA "The Butcher of Norfolk".

Gary L. Francione, professor of law at Rutgers Law School and a proponent of abolitionism, says that PETA is not an animal rights group because of their willingness to work with industries that use animals to achieve incremental change. Francione says PETA trivializes the movement with their "Three Stooges" theory of animal rights, making the public think progress is underway when the changes are only cosmetic. "Their campaigns are selected more for media image than content." Francione has criticized PETA for having caused grassroots animal rights groups to close, groups that were essential for the survival of the animal rights movement, and rejects the centrality of corporate animal charities. Francione wrote that PETA initially set up independent chapters around the United States, but closed them in favor of a top-down, centralized organization, which not only consolidated decision-making power, but centralized donations. Now, local animal rights donations go to PETA, rather than to a local group.

== See also ==
- Direct Action Everywhere
- European Vegetarian Union
- International Vegetarian Union
- Mercy for Animals
- Women and animal advocacy
- List of animal rights advocates
- List of animal rights groups
- Open rescue
- Veganism
