= Silver Spring monkeys =

Macaques used in neuroplasticity research; subjects of an animal-cruelty court case

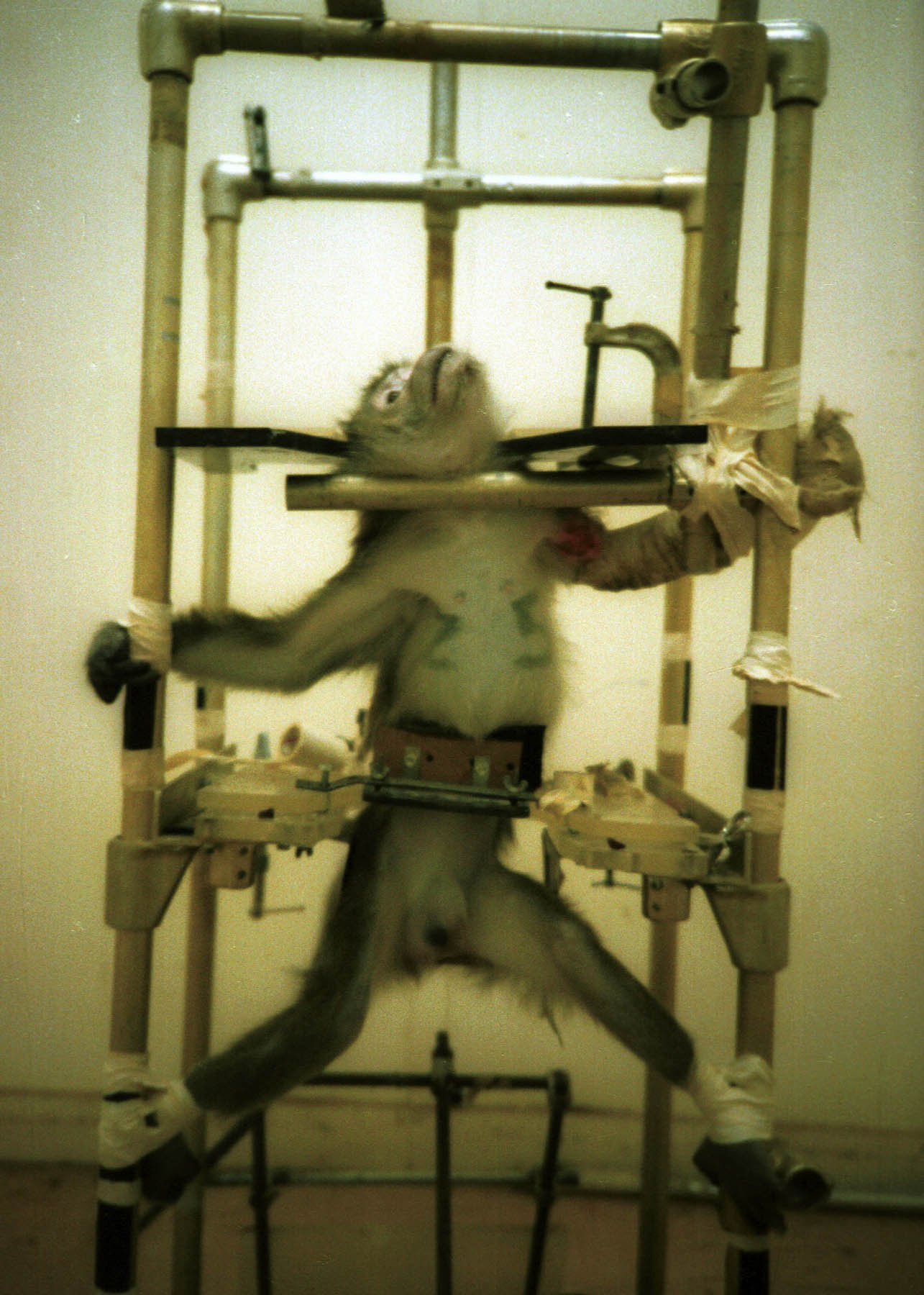
- Domitian, one of the Silver Spring monkeys, in one of the images distributed by PETA to newspapers
- Date: May 1981; 45 years ago
- Location: Institute for Behavioral Research, Silver Spring, Maryland, U.S.
- First reporter: The Washington Post
- Participants: Edward Taub, Alex Pacheco, Ingrid Newkirk, People for the Ethical Treatment of Animals
- Outcome: Advance in research into neuroplasticity and the treatment of strokes; first police raid on a U.S. laboratory; first criminal conviction for animal cruelty of a U.S. researcher (overturned); introduction of the 1985 Animal Welfare Act; reported creation of the first Animal Liberation Front cell in North America
- Deaths: Seventeen macaque monkeys
- Charges: Edward Taub charged with 17 counts of animal cruelty and six of failing to provide adequate veterinary care.
- Convictions: Taub convicted on six counts, overturned on appeal.

The Silver Spring monkeys were 17 wild-born macaque monkeys from the Philippines who were kept in the Institute for Behavioral Research in Silver Spring, Maryland. From 1981 until 1991, they became what one writer called the most famous lab animals in history, as a result of a battle between primate researchers, animal advocates, politicians, and the courts over whether to use them in research or release them to a sanctuary. Within the scientific community, the monkeys became known for their use in experiments into neuroplasticity—the ability of the adult primate brain to reorganize itself.

The monkeys had been used as research subjects by Edward Taub, a behavioral neuroscientist, who had cut afferent ganglia that supplied sensation to the brain from their arms, then used arm slings to restrain either the good or deafferented arm to train them to use the limbs they could not feel. In May 1981, Alex Pacheco of the animal-rights group People for the Ethical Treatment of Animals (PETA) began working undercover in the lab, and alerted police to what PETA viewed as unacceptable living conditions for the monkeys. In what was the first police raid in the U.S. against an animal researcher, police entered the Institute and removed the monkeys, charging Taub with 17 counts of animal cruelty and failing to provide adequate veterinary care. He was convicted on six counts; five were overturned during a second trial, and the final conviction was overturned on appeal in 1983, when the court ruled that Maryland's animal cruelty legislation did not apply to federally funded laboratories.

The ensuing battle over the monkeys' custody saw celebrities and politicians campaign for the monkeys' release, an amendment in 1985 to the Animal Welfare Act, the transformation of PETA from a group of friends into a national movement, the creation of the first North American Animal Liberation Front cell, and the first animal research case to reach the United States Supreme Court. In July 1991, PETA's application to the Supreme Court for custody was rejected. Days later, the last two monkeys were killed after veterinarians determined they were suffering and should be euthanized.

During the subsequent dissection of the monkeys, it was discovered that significant cortical remapping had occurred, suggesting that being forced to use limbs with no sensory input had triggered changes in their brains' organization. This evidence of the brain's plasticity helped overturn the widely held view that the adult brain cannot reorganize itself in response to its environment.

== Background ==
=== Edward Taub ===
Edward Taub (born 1931) is a behavioral neuroscientist currently based at the University of Alabama at Birmingham. He became interested in behaviorism while studying philosophy at Columbia University and went on to study under Fred Keller and Wiliam N. Schoenfeld, the experimental psychologists. He took a job as a research assistant in a neurology lab to gain more understanding of the nervous system and became involved in deafferentation experiments with monkeys.

An afferent nerve is a sensory nerve that conveys impulses from the skin and other sensory organs to the spine and the brain. Deafferentation is a surgical procedure in which the spinal cord is opened up and the sensory nerves cut so that these impulses do not reach the brain. A monkey whose limbs have been deafferented will not feel them, or even be able to sense where they are in space. At his trial in 1981, Taub told the court that deafferented monkeys are notoriously difficult to look after, because they regard their deafferented limbs as foreign objects, mutilating them and trying to chew them off. Taub continued working with deafferented monkeys at New York University, where he obtained his Ph.D. in 1970. Engaged in what he saw at first as pure research, he conducted several kinds of deafferentation experiments. These included deafferenting monkeys' entire bodies, deafferenting monkeys at birth, and deafferenting fetuses before returning them to the uterus.

When Taub began his research in the neurology lab, the prevalent view was that monkeys would not be able to use limbs they could not feel. Norman Doidge writes that Taub wondered whether the reason the monkeys abandoned use of the deafferented limbs was simply that they were still able to use their good ones. He tested his idea by deafferenting one arm of a monkey and restraining the good arm in a sling. The monkey subsequently used its deafferented arm to feed and move itself around. He reasoned that, if a monkey refused to use a deafferented arm because it could rely on its good arm, then deafferenting both arms would force the monkey to use them, a finding that seemed paradoxical, but which his experiments confirmed. He even deafferented the entire spinal cord, so that the monkey received no sensory input from any of its limbs, but it still used them. Doidge writes that Taub had an epiphany, guessing that the reason the monkeys would not use their deafferented limbs was simply because they had learned not to, an idea he called "learned non-use".

=== Alex Pacheco ===
Alex Pacheco (born 1958) was a graduate student at George Washington University when he volunteered in May 1981 to work as a research assistant in Taub's lab. The Washington Post writes that he was raised in Mexico, the son of a doctor, and wanted to become a priest. He took a tour of a slaughterhouse in the 1970s and said it changed his life; he read Peter Singer's Animal Liberation (1975), stopped eating meat, and became an animal rights activist. He worked on an anti-whaling ship for the Sea Shepherd Conservation Society, joined the Hunt Saboteurs Association in England, and when he returned to the United States to study political science at George Washington, he teamed up with Ingrid Newkirk, a local poundmaster, to form People for the Ethical Treatment of Animals in March 1980. The point of taking the research position in Taub's lab was to gain firsthand experience of what happens in animal research laboratories, so he looked through a list of government-funded labs and chose the one nearest his home in Takoma Park. Taub offered him an unpaid position and put him to work with a student, Georgette Yakalis.

=== The monkeys ===
Inside the Institute for Behavioral Research, Taub was conducting deafferentation experiments on 16 male crab-eating macaques (Macaca fascicularis), and one female rhesus macaque (Macaca mulatta), each about 36 centimetres (14 inches) tall, all born wild in the Philippines. Each monkey lived alone in a wire cage measuring 46 cm × 46 cm (18 in × 18 in), with no bedding, no food bowl, and no environmental enrichment, the cages kept in a windowless room measuring 4.6 m (15 ft) square. Pacheco writes that 12 of the 17 monkeys had had one or both arms deafferented, while according to the Laboratory Primate Newsletter 10 had undergone deafferentation, the seven others acting as the control group.

The researchers had named the monkeys Chester, Paul, Billy, Hard Times, Domitian, Nero, Titus, Big Boy, Augustus, Allen, Montaigne, Sisyphus, Charlie, Brooks, Hayden, Adidas, and Sarah. Sarah, the lone female, was a control subject, which meant she had been left intact. She had been purchased from a dealer, Litton Laboratories, when she was one day old, and had lived since then, for eight years, in the institute. Paul was the eldest. He had had one arm deafferented. He had chewed off all the fingers on that hand and pulled the skin and flesh off the palm, exposing the bone. Billy had undergone surgery to deafferent both arms and used his feet to pick up food pellets.

== Police raid and charges ==
=== Pacheco's description of the laboratory ===
Pacheco wrote that he found the monkeys living in filthy conditions. He found frozen monkey corpses in a refrigerator, and others floating in formaldehyde. He alleged that, in the surgery room, human and monkey records were scattered everywhere, including under the operating table, while soiled clothes, old shoes, rat droppings, and urine covered the floor, with cockroaches in the drawers, on the floor, and around the scrub sink. He said the wires of the cages were caked in filth, with feces piled in the bottom of the cages, and urine and rust on every surface, with the 17 monkeys picking at scraps of food that had fallen through the wire floor of the cages into the waste tray below. He alleged that the cages had not been cleaned for months, that there were no dishes to keep the food away from the feces, and that there was nothing for the monkeys to sit on but the cages' wire bottoms. He wrote that 12 of the monkeys had deafferented limbs, with 39 of their fingers deformed or missing. He described them as neurotic, attacking their deafferented limbs as though they were foreign objects:

No one bothered to bandage the monkeys' injuries properly (on the few occasions when bandages were used at all), and antibiotics were administered only once; no lacerations or self-amputation injuries were ever cleaned. Whenever a bandage was applied, it was never changed, no matter how filthy or soiled it became. They were left on until they deteriorated to the point where they fell off the injured limb. Old, rotted fragments of bandage were stuck to the cage floors where they collected urine and feces. The monkeys also suffered from a variety of wounds that were self-inflicted or inflicted by monkeys grabbing at them from adjoining cages. I saw discolored, exposed muscle tissue on their arms. Two monkeys had bones protruding through their flesh. Several had bitten off their own fingers and had festering stubs, which they extended towards me as I discreetly took the fruit from my pockets. With these pitiful limbs they searched through the foul mess of their waste pans for something to eat.

=== Informal inspections and raid ===
Pacheco decided to document the conditions in the lab. He told Taub he wanted to work at night and took photographs that showed the monkeys' living conditions. He showed them in July to animal rights activists, including Cleveland Amory, who gave him money for a better camera and some walkie-talkies, so that a look-out outside could alert him if visitors arrived unexpectedly. He also asked Peter Hamilton of the Vancouver-based Lifeforce Foundation to assist with the investigation. In August, Pacheco began inviting veterinarians and scientists into the lab to witness the conditions. According to The Washington Post, Geza Teleki, a primatologist at George Washington University, wrote that he had never seen a lab so poorly maintained, and psychologist Donald Barnes, a former primate researcher, wrote that it was a "miserable and unhealthful environment for the primates" and a health hazard for humans. One local veterinarian, Richard Weitzman, agreed that the lab was very dirty, but said the monkeys seemed well fed and "in pretty good health".

Pacheco reported the situation to the Montgomery County police, who raided the laboratory on September 11, 1981, under Maryland's Prevention of Cruelty to Animals law. PETA tipped off the media beforehand, so that the raid was witnessed by several reporters and a camera crew, to the irritation of the police. The officers later testified that the monkeys were living in filthy conditions. Richard Swain, who led the raid, told The Washington Post in 1991: "It was absolutely filthy, just incredibly dirty, like nothing I've ever been in. I've executed lots and lots of search warrants. I've worked in murder, in narcotics, in vice, but this was the first time I went into a room, and I felt legitimately concerned for my health just being there." Taub was charged with 17 counts of animal cruelty and failing to provide adequate veterinary care.

The police removed the monkeys from the lab to the basement of a house in Rockville owned by Lori Kenealy of the local humane society. The monkeys were given toys, groomed with toothbrushes by the activists, watched 24 hours a day, and allowed to watch daytime soap operas. In the meantime, Taub's lawyers went to court and demanded their return, and ten days after the raid a judge granted the request. Immediately afterward, the monkeys disappeared. Kenealy was not at home when it happened, and insisted she knew nothing about it. Richard Swain, who had led the police raid, arrested her and put her in the local jail overnight. PETA was told there could be no legal action against Taub without the monkeys as evidence. Five days later the monkeys were suddenly returned, this time with Spanish moss in their cages after a holiday in Florida, according to the activists. After another brief stand-off, the monkeys were returned to Taub.

=== Taub's response ===
Taub said he had been set up. He said his laboratory had been clean when he left on vacation, but that Pacheco had failed to clean the cages, had neglected the animals, then subjected the laboratory to false reports of cruelty. During Taub's vacation that August, which lasted over two weeks, on seven different days in which the animals were supposed to have been fed and the cage area cleaned, the two caretakers failed to show up for work. Taub estimated the probability of seven absences in that 2.5-week period at seven in a trillion based on the previous 14 months of attendance records from the workers. On three of those absentee days, Pacheco brought people in to look at the monkeys. Taub's research assistant, John Kunz, a graduate student, said it was simply that the caretakers took advantage of Taub's absence to have a holiday of their own.

During the October and November 1981 trial of Taub and Kunz, Taub told the court—as reported by The Baltimore Sun—that the monkeys had been given "gentle" treatment and had what he called a "remarkable record of health." He acknowledged that they had not been seen by a veterinarian in the previous two years, because he was an expert himself in the treatment of deafferented monkeys. Responding to the images of the monkeys with open sores and decaying bandages, he said that using salves, ointments, and bandages is more dangerous than leaving the conditions untreated; monkeys feel no pain from the deafferented limbs and learn to ignore them, he said, whereas drawing attention to the wounds with salves or bandages would cause the animals to bite or claw at them. Bandages might be necessary where the wounds had grown out of control, or where there was massive infection, and it was sometimes better to let the bandages deteriorate, he said. Taub also testified that some of the photographs Pacheco took had been staged for dramatic effect. Norman Doidge wrote in 2007 that, according to Taub, the monkeys in the photographs had been placed in positions that were not part of the laboratory procedure, a claim Pacheco denied. As for the dirt, Taub said "monkey rooms are dirty places," and that it was normal in laboratories for fecal matter to lie on the floor and food to drop through the cage bottoms into waste trays. He said employees had used brooms and mops on the floor and had emptied the waste trays nearly every day. He said the monkeys had been given fresh fruit twice a week, and that he disagreed with the veterinarians who testified for the prosecution that the female monkey, Sarah, was underweight.

=== National Institutes of Health investigation ===
The National Institutes of Health (NIH), which had financed Taub's research, suspended his $115,000 research grant (equivalent to $407,000 in 2025). It initiated its own investigation, and sent the Office for the Protection from Research Risks (OPRR) to assess Taub's lab. OPRR found that the lab's animal care failed in significant ways, and concluded that it was grossly unsanitary. Based on the OPRR investigation, NIH suspended the remaining funding for the experiments, over $200,000 (equivalent to $708,000 in 2025), because of violations of its animal care guidelines. William Raub and Joe Held, officials at NIH, wrote in the Neuroscience Newsletter in April 1983 that deafferented monkeys kept at NIH since May 1981, and subjected to the same surgical procedures, had not developed lesions comparable to those in five of the deafferented monkeys from Taub's lab. "Based on these observations," they wrote, "it would appear that fractures, dislocations, lacerations, punctures, contusions, and abrasions with accompanying infection, acute and chronic inflammation, and necrosis are not the inevitable consequences of deafferentation." After the appeal, according to Doidge writing in 2007, 67 professional societies made representations on Taub's behalf, and the NIH reversed its decision not to fund his research. In 1991 neuroscientist David Hubel, referring to both the Silver Spring monkeys case and a PETA film about the University of Pennsylvania's head injury clinic in 1984, said the science was sound, that the people involved were not cruel, and that at the time there was a "laxness of standards" in animal care that, he wrote, would hardly be conceivable today.

== Trials and appeal ==
=== First trial (October 1981) ===
According to Peter Carlson, every aspect of the case was disputed by experts on both sides during the first trial in October 1981. The prosecution said that Taub's lab was filthy and unhealthy, and federal inspection reports and witnesses supported the charge. Taub said the lab was no dirtier than any other, and he also produced federal inspection reports and witnesses to support his position. Veterinarians speaking for the prosecution said Taub's failure to bandage the monkeys' wounds was a threat to their health; veterinarians for the defense, including two who had worked with monkeys whose limbs had been deafferented, said bandaging them would cause the animals to attack the limbs. Carlson writes that the prosecution produced 70 photographs of dirty conditions and injured monkeys, while researchers who had worked in the lab testified for the defense that they had never seen the lab looking like that. The judge—District Court Judge Stanley Klavan—found Taub guilty of six counts of cruelty to animals for failing to provide adequate veterinary care in respect of six of the monkeys and acquitted him of the other 11 charges against him. He fined Taub $3,000. The laboratory assistant, John Kunz, was acquitted of all 17 charges.

=== Second trial and appeal (1982 and 1983) ===
Taub managed to secure a second trial in June 1982. After three weeks at the Montgomery County Circuit Court, a jury acquitted him of five of the convictions, and upheld the sixth charge of inadequate veterinary care of Nero, whose wounds were such that an NIH veterinarian later amputated his deafferented arm. Taub was fined $500. The sixth charge was set aside on appeal, when the court ruled that Maryland's Prevention of Cruelty to Animals law did not apply to federally funded laboratories.

== Fight for custody ==
After the monkeys were returned to Taub's custody, they were transferred to an NIH facility. They were later removed to the Tulane Regional Primate Research Center in Covington, Louisiana, still under the care and control of the NIH. Two primate sanctuaries, Moorpark College in California and Primarily Primates in Texas, offered them a permanent home, but the NIH refused to release them.

The monkeys were moved by the NIH to the Delta Primate Center in June 1986, where animal rights activists, who had been able to visit and groom the animals at the previous center, were told they could no longer see them. In 1987, the custodians of 14 of the remaining monkeys recommended that eight of them be euthanized, because they were judged to be beyond hope of resocialization. A lawsuit filed by PETA and others sought to block euthanasia and transfer the animals to a facility under their control. The New England Anti-Vivisection Society and PETA ran ads in The New York Times on December 26, 1989, The Washington Post on December 27, and in The Washington Times on January 3, 1990, asking President Bush to save the monkeys, and concerned citizens to petition the White House. PETA also hired Tom Vice, a consultant veterinarian associated with the non-profit Primarily Primates to assess Billy, one of the monkeys set to be euthanized by Tulane. Billy had two disabled arms, extensive pressure wounds, diaper rashes, bone infections, and kidney damage from antibiotic use. Vice's recommendations to proceed with the euthanasia was rejected by Pacheco and PETA's lawyers. One of the Tulane veterinarians caring for the monkeys, Marion Ratterree recalled, "We were standing here when he made the call. He was shocked. We were shocked."

After the court denied custody to PETA, two of the monkeys, Titus and Allen, were kept for the National Institutes of Health at a Tulane University primate center, where they were later euthanized. On January 10, 1990, Tulane successfully argued to euthanize Billy in the U.S. District Court of Appeals, doing so four days later. The rejection of Vice's assessment was subsequently reiterated by Peter Gerone, the then head of Tulane's federal primate center, on radio appearances and in letters, saying "We had them [PETA] by the short hairs and twisting when Billy was sick and their own vet recommended he be put down and they said no...so much for PETA's concern for the welfare of animals."

== Final experiments and euthanasia ==
The homunculi showing which parts of the body are controlled by the sensory cortex and motor cortex. Taub's research on the Silver Spring monkeys challenged the paradigm that brain functions are fixed in certain locations.

The NIH had said in 1987 that no further invasive research would be conducted on the monkeys, but in fact further experiments were performed on them in 1990. NIH presented the experiments in the lawsuit for custody of the animals in 1989. It proposed to perform deep surgical anesthesia during all procedures followed by euthanasia. After euthanasia, tissue examination would continue. The court allowed a group of researchers from the NIH to conduct a terminal experiment on January 14, 1990, on one of the monkeys who had become ill. Under anesthesia, electrodes were placed in his brain and hundreds of recordings taken. The Laboratory Primate Newsletter said it revealed an "unprecedented degree of reorganization of the sensory cortex. An 8-to-10-millimeter-wide area that would normally receive input from the hand was found to have completely filled in with input from the face." Brainmapping studies were conducted on the remaining monkeys on July 6, 1990, three days after PETA's application for custody was rejected. The monkeys were subsequently euthanized. During these experiments, scientists discovered an unpredicted change in thalamus structure apparently caused by progressive nerve degeneration through the dorsal root ganglia (which were severed) and the dorsal columns all the way to the thalamus (a second order synaptic target).

== Constraint-induced movement therapy ==
Based in part on his work with the Silver Spring monkeys, Taub went on to develop novel physical therapy techniques to help stroke victims, and those with other forms of brain injury, regain the use of affected limbs. The American Stroke Association regards Taub's therapy, known as constraint-induced movement therapy (CI), as "at the forefront of a revolution" in the treatment of stroke survivors. With CI therapy, the patient is forced to use the affected limb, to whatever minimal extent he can, by having the unaffected one restrained. The affected limb is then used intensively for three to six hours each day for at least two weeks. As a result of engaging in repetitive movements with the affected limb, the brain grows new neural pathways that control the limb's use, as a result of which stroke victims who were seriously disabled for many years have reportedly regained the use of limbs that were almost completely paralysed.

== See also ==
- Cruelty to animals
- Animal liberation
- Animal research
- Animal rights movement

== Bibliography ==
- Barnard ND; Selby R; Robinson DN; Schreckenberg GM; Van Petten C. "NIH research protocol for Silver Spring monkeys: A case of scientific misconduct (Part I)", February 24, 2003.
- "Part II", August 22, 2004, accessed December 7, 2010.
- Blum, Deborah. The Monkey Wars. Oxford University Press, 1995.
- Boffey, Philip M. (October 27, 1981). "Animals in the lab: Protests accelerate, but use is dropping". The New York Times.
- Carbone, Larry. What Animals Want: Expertise and Advocacy in Laboratory Animal Welfare Policy. Oxford University Press, 2004.
- Carlson, Peter. "The Great Silver Spring Monkey Debate," The Washington Post magazine, February 24, 1991.
- Clarke, A.S. "'Silver Spring' Monkeys at the San Diego Zoo", Laboratory Primate Newsletter, Volume 27, No. 3, July 1988, accessed December 7, 2010.
- Dajer, T. "Monkeying with the Brain", Discover, January 1992.
- Doidge, Norman. The Brain That Changes Itself. Viking Penguin 2007.
- Ettlin, David Michael. "Taub denies allegations of cruelty", The Baltimore Sun, November 1, 1981.
- Guillermo, Kathy Snow. Monkey Business. National Press Books, 1993.
- Holder, Constance. "Scientist convicted for monkey neglect," Science, vol 214, December 11, 1981.
- Johnson, David. Review of The Mind and the Brain: Neuroplasticity and the Power of Mental Force, curledup.com, accessed December 7, 2010.
- Jones E.G., Pons T.P. (1998). "Thalamic and brainstem contributions to large-scale plasticity of primate somatosensory cortex". Science. 282 (5391): 1121–5. Bibcode:1998Sci...282.1121J. doi:10.1126/science.282.5391.1121. PMID 9804550.
- Leary, Warren E. (January 18, 1990). "Animal Rights Groups Vow Suit to Save Monkeys". The New York Times.
- Leary, Warren E. (June 28, 1991). "Renewal of Brain Is Found In Disputed Monkey Tests". The New York Times.
- Merzenich M (1998). "Long-term change of mind". Science. 282 (5391): 1062–3. doi:10.1126/science.282.5391.1062. PMID 9841454. S2CID 6855158.
- Newkirk, Ingrid. Free the Animals. Lantern Books, 2000.
- Pacheco, Alex and Francione, Anna. "The Silver Spring Monkeys" in Singer, Peter. In Defense of Animals. Basil Blackwell, 1985.
- Reinhold, Robert (May 23, 1987). "Fate of monkeys, deformed for science, causes human hurt after six years". The New York Times.
- Sideris Lisa, McCarthy Charles, Smith David H (1999). "Bioethics of Laboratory Animal Research. Roots of Concern with Nonhuman Animals in Biomedical Ethics". ILAR Journal. 40 (1): 3–14. doi:10.1093/ilar.40.1.3. PMID 11533511. Archived from the original on 2008-06-03.
- Schwartz, Jeffrey and Begley, Sharon. The Mind and the Brain: Neuroplasticity and the Power of Mental Force. HarperCollins, 2002.
- Stroke Connection Magazine. "Constraint-Induced Movement Therapy", "A Rehab Revolution," September/October 2004, accessed December 7, 2010.
- University of Alabama at Birmingham. "Dr. Edward Taub" Archived 2005-03-08 at the Wayback Machine, Department of Psychology, accessed December 7, 2010.
