= Alex Pacheco (activist) =

American animal rights activist (born 1958)

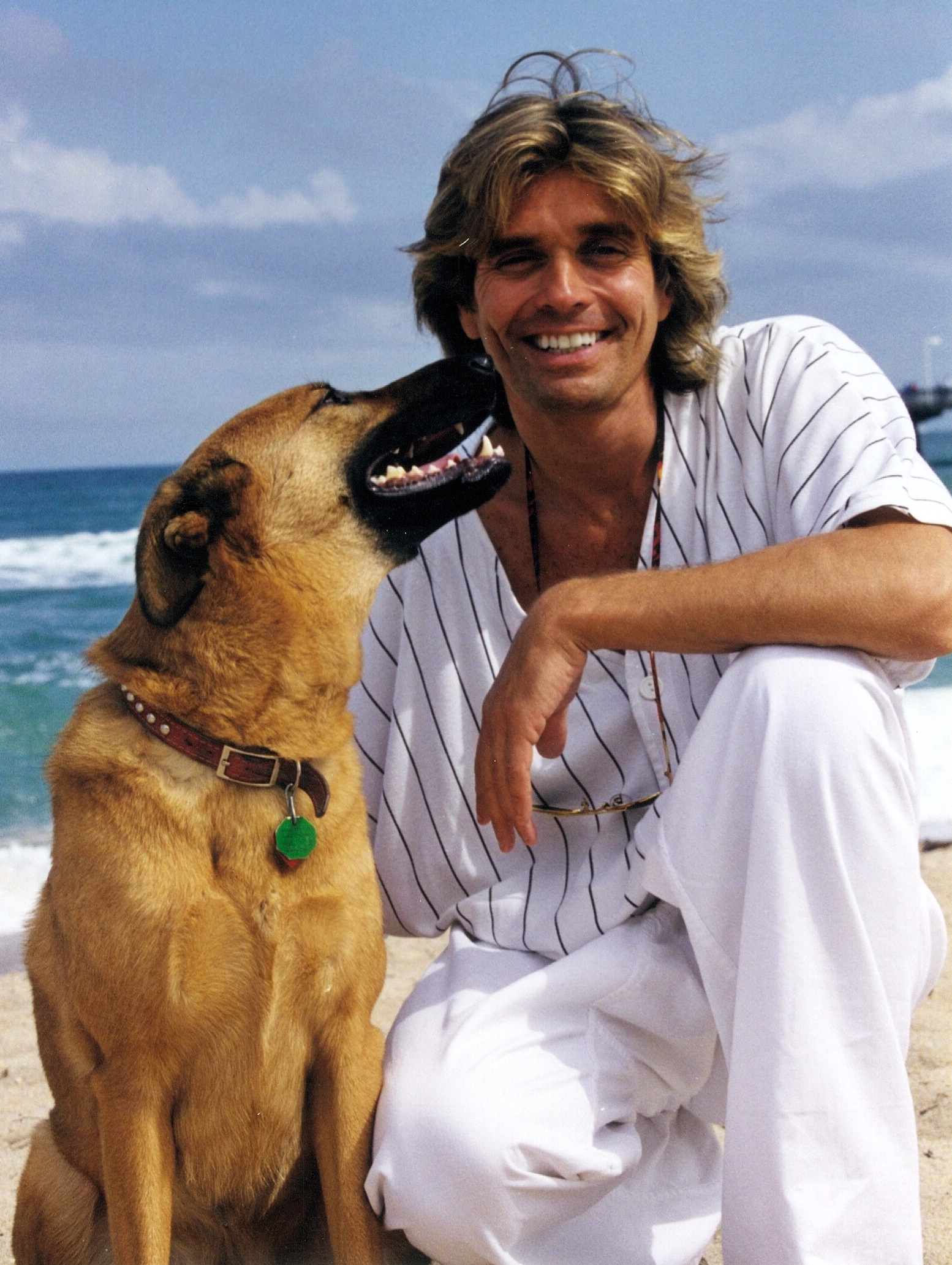
- Born: Alexander Fernando Pacheco; August 1958 (age 67–68); Joliet, Illinois, U.S.
- Education: Ohio State University
- Known for: Animal rights advocacy Founder, 600 Million Stray Dogs Need You; Co-founder, People for the Ethical Treatment of Animals (PETA)
- Awards: U.S. Animal Rights Hall of Fame (2001); The Peace Abbey Courage of Conscience (1995); Sea Shepherd Crew Member of the Year (1979)
- Website: www.600milliondogs.org

Alexander Fernando Pacheco (born August 1958) is an American animal rights activist. He is the founder of 600 Million Dogs, co-founder and former chairman of People for the Ethical Treatment of Animals (PETA) and a member of the advisory board of the Sea Shepherd Conservation Society.

Pacheco first crewed with Captain Paul Watson in 1979 on the ship Sea Shepherd across the Atlantic Ocean, during a campaign of opposition to the Sierra, a Portuguese pirate whaling ship. Both The Sea Shepherd and the Sierra were sunk after being seized by the Portuguese authorities.

Pacheco came to wider public attention in 1981 for his role, along with Ingrid Newkirk, in what became known as the Silver Spring monkeys case, a campaign to release 17 crab-eating macaques who were undergoing experiments in the Institute for Behavioral Research in Silver Spring, Maryland. Filmmaker Oliver Stone writes that the political campaign to save the monkeys gave birth to the animal rights movement in the United States.

== Early life and education ==
Pacheco was born in Joliet, Illinois, but moved to Mexico with his family when he was very young, where he and his two siblings were raised near the ocean by his Mexican father, a physician, and his mother, an American nurse. Kathy Snow Guillermo writes in Monkey Business (1993) that Pacheco's early life was filled with animals; bats lived in the rubber trees in his front yard, snakes slept behind nearby rocks, and fishermen regularly dragged dolphins out of the water onto the beach. Instead of animals being killed for food in slaughterhouses, pigs, oxen, chickens, and turkeys were frequently killed in front of him.

The family left Mexico when Pacheco was in junior high, and moved between Ohio, Indiana, and Illinois. His interest in animals continued. He bought turtles and birds from pet stores, and a baby crab-eating macaque, whom he called Chi Chi and who would perch on his shoulder as he walked around the house.

He attended a Catholic university in Ohio, intending to enter the priesthood, but while in Canada in his first year at the university, he visited a friend who worked at a meat-packing plant. Guillermo writes that he was shocked by the sight of two men throwing a newborn calf, cut from the uterus of its slaughtered mother, into a dumpster. Later in the week, a friend gave him a copy of Peter Singer's Animal Liberation, and he returned to Ohio as a vegetarian. His heart was no longer in becoming a priest, and he decided to attend Ohio State University in Columbus, Ohio and devote himself to helping what he called "other-than-human beings".

== Activism ==
=== Sea Shepherd ===
At university, Pacheco organized campaigns against the use of leghold traps and castrating pigs and cattle without anesthetic. Guillermo writes that, as Ohio is an agricultural state, his activism met with stiff opposition and the occasional anonymous telephone call threatening to blow his head off.

In 1979, he attended a talk in Columbus, Ohio, by Cleveland Amory of the Saturday Review, who was also the founder of the Fund for Animals, which funded the anti-whaling vessel the Sea Shepherd. He sought Amory out after the talk and volunteered. Pacheco first crewed with Paul Watson on the ship for the summer in 1979 (and again in 2003), in the bridge, the engine room and as a deckhand, during the Sea Shepherd's first whale protection campaign, known as The Sierra Campaign, across the Atlantic, which ended with both the Sea Shepherd and the Sierra being sunk, in Portugal in 1980.

=== Silver Spring monkeys case ===
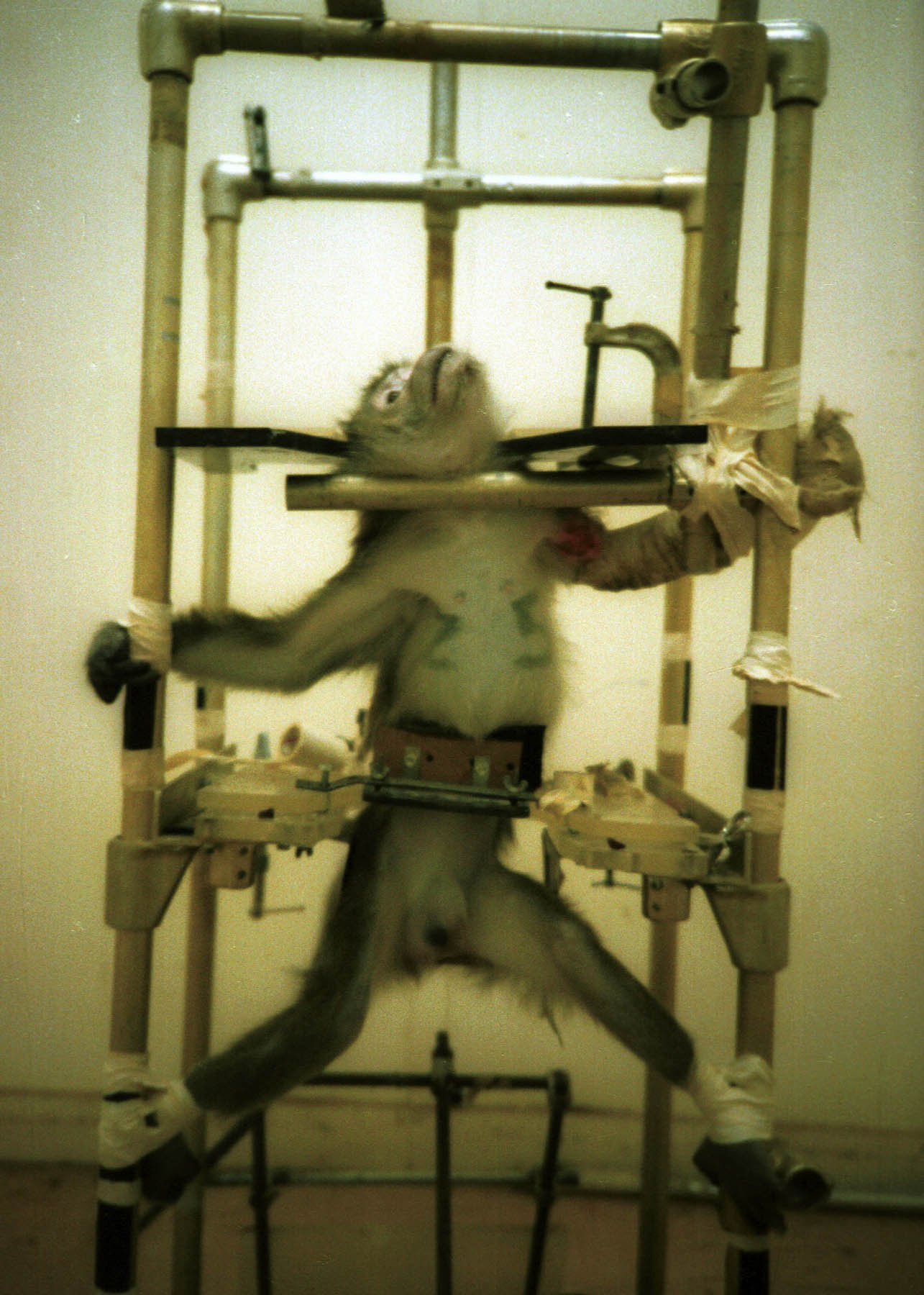
One of the photographs Pacheco took inside the Institute for Behavioral Research, 1981

The Silver Spring monkeys case began in 1981, when Pacheco took a job as a volunteer inside the Institute for Behavioral Research in Silver Spring, Maryland. Edward Taub, a neuroscientist, was cutting sensory ganglia that supplied nerves to the fingers, hands, arms, and legs of 17 macaque monkeys – a process known as "deafferentation" – so that the monkeys could not feel them. (Some of them had had their entire spinal columns deafferented.) Taub used restraint and electric shock to force the monkeys to use the limbs they could not feel. He discovered that, when motivated by extreme hunger or the desire to avoid electric shock, they could be induced to use their deafferented limbs. The research led in part to the discovery of neuroplasticity within the primate motor system and a new therapy for stroke victims called constraint-induced movement therapy that helped restore the use of affected limbs. Pacheco reported Taub for violations of animal cruelty laws based on the animals' living conditions.

Police raided the lab, seized the monkeys and charged Taub with 119 counts of animal cruelty and failure to provide adequate veterinary care, the first such charges brought in the United States against a research scientist. 113 charges were dismissed at the first court hearing. Taub was initially convicted on six misdemeanor counts of failure to provide adequate veterinary care. Five convictions were dismissed after a second trial, and the final conviction was overturned on appeal when the court ruled that Maryland's Prevention of Cruelty to Animals law did not apply to researchers.

In 1990, Washingtonian magazine published an article alleging that Pacheco's photo of a monkey in a restraint chair was "staged." PETA filed a $3 million libel lawsuit, which was settled out of court when the magazine agreed to issue an apology and donate an unspecified amount of money to animal rights organizations.

The legal battle for custody of the monkeys, following their removal by PETA, reached the United States Supreme Court. It was the first animal-rights case to do so, though the newly formed PETA ultimately failed in its battle to secure the animals' release. The proceedings, which lasted years, generated a large amount of publicity for PETA, transforming it from what Ingrid Newkirk called "five people in a basement" into a national movement. As a result of the case, the House of Representatives Subcommittee on Science, Research and Technology held hearings that led to the 1985 Animal Welfare Act, and in 1986 changes in United States Public Health Service guidelines for animals used in animal research included a requirement that each institution seeking federal funding have an Institutional Animal Care and Use Committee whose job it is to oversee how laboratory animals within that institution are cared for.

=== Snare trapping of wild pigs and goats in Hawaii ===
In 1992, Pacheco and a staffer went to the Hawaiian island of Molokai and destroyed several hundred wire snares that were causing pigs and goats to die slowly of strangulation, starvation, and dehydration. The traps had been set by the Nature Conservancy in an effort to preserve native species by killing non-native species. After this was publicized, the Nature Conservancy discontinued the trapping.

=== Dogs at Pentagon wound lab ===
In July 1983, The New York Times reported that Pacheco was responsible for Defense Secretary Caspar Weinberger halting Pentagon plans to shoot dogs in a "wound laboratory" at a military medical facility near Washington, D.C. Pacheco had learned about the project and notified both Congress and The Washington Post. Weinberger had a collie, and when he read the article, he immediately banned the use of dogs in the experiments. Two days later, he also ordered the Pentagon to review the plans and suspend the shooting of pigs, goats, and other animals until the review was completed.

Pacheco continued to raise public awareness of the issue through protests.

He also worked with Congressional contacts and the media in order to convince the military to make the change permanent and include other facilities and other species. In November 1983, Congressional representatives instructed the Defense Department not to use dogs and cats in any wound laboratories, and the policy went into effect in January 1984.

In late 1984, after continued public pressure and completion of the review ordered by Secretary Weinberger, the secretaries of the Army and Air Force banned the use of dogs and cats not just in wound labs, but in all biomedical and clinical research under their control.

=== Horse slaughter in Texas ===
In late 1983, Pacheco went to Falls County, Texas, to investigate reports of horses dying in fields. At least 14,000 horses had been gathered by a company called Horses Unlimited, which planned to fatten them for slaughter and sale in Europe as horsemeat. Instead, 2,000 horses died of starvation, and one third of the rest suffered from severe malnutrition.

Pacheco and others tried to aid the horses but were threatened with arrest by Falls County authorities, PETA told reporters. He took his investigation and evidence of cruelty to the national media in early 1984. State investigators called it "one of the biggest cases of animal abuse in the state's history", and Jacy Reese Anthis described it as "the first modern undercover investigation of farmed animal abuse" in his 2018 book The End of Animal Farming.

As a result of his efforts, Pacheco was brought before a grand jury on criminal charges. He was represented by well-known defense attorney Richard "Racehorse" Haynes, and the charges were dropped. The same month, the slaughter operation closed down permanently.

=== Pennsylvania head injury lab's baboon experiments ===
In May 1984, Pacheco compiled a 30-minute video called Unnecessary Fuss based on 60 hours of videotapes taken from the Pennsylvania Head Injury Lab by the underground organization Animal Liberation Front.

The videos, made by the researchers, showed baboons receiving severe head and neck injuries from a head-acceleration machine. The videos also included footage of the researchers laughing at injured, brain-damaged animals.

After nearly a year of other efforts to stop the federal government from continuing to fund this laboratory, in July 1985 Pacheco led approximately 100 activists in a sit-in at the headquarters of the National Institutes of Health, the federal agency funding the experiments. The sit-in lasted 4 days, after which Secretary of Health and Human Services Margaret Heckler publicly announced the termination of funding for the $14 million Head Injury Laboratory at the University of Pennsylvania.

=== Testing on animals; declining sales of fur ===
During his 20-year tenure as chairman of PETA, Pacheco was involved in bringing public attention to the way animals are treated in cosmetic tests and in urging companies to abandon this practice. These campaigns resulted in major companies such as Avon, Revlon, and Benetton ending animal tests on products sold in the U.S., and hundreds of other companies pledging to do the same.

He was also involved in informing the public about the treatment of animals used for fur. The publicity by PETA was considered by the media, the public, and some in the fur industry to have caused a decline in fur sales.

=== Spokesperson for the Animal Liberation Front ===
Pacheco was the subject of grand jury investigations because he sometimes obtained information from, and served as the spokesperson for, the underground Animal Liberation Front, which broke into animal facilities to remove animals, gather evidence of cruelty, and sometimes damage laboratory equipment.

=== 600 Million Dogs ===
In 2010, Alex Pacheco founded 600 Million Dogs with the mission to develop safe veterinary formulas to permanently end the number one cause of suffering and death for dogs and cats worldwide—dog and cat overpopulation. The first formulas in development are Spay and Neuter Cookies, which are being designed to safely sterilize strays—without surgery. The objective is to end the cycle of suffering for the tens of millions of stray cats in the U.S. and end the cycle of suffering for the 600 million stray dogs worldwide, who give birth to over one billion stray pups each year. The organization is also dedicated to alleviating the plight of the 29 million people who are treated for rabies each year, and preventing the deaths of the 59,000 people who die from rabies each year.

== Awards ==
The Peace Abbey, of Sherborn, Massachusetts, awarded Alex Pacheco the Courage of Conscience award in 1995. In 2001, Pacheco was inducted into the US Animal Rights Hall of Fame.

== See also ==
- Unnecessary Fuss, 1984 documentary
- List of animal rights advocates
