= Unnecessary Fuss =

- Produced by: Ingrid Newkirk and Alex Pacheco (PETA)
- Release date: 1984
- Running time: 26 minutes
- Country: United States
- Language: English

Unnecessary Fuss is a film produced by People for the Ethical Treatment of Animals (PETA), showing footage shot inside the University of Pennsylvania's Head Injury Clinic in Philadelphia. The raw footage was recorded by the laboratory researchers as they inflicted brain damage to baboons using a hydraulic device. The experiments were conducted as part of a research project into head injuries such as is caused in vehicle accidents.

Sixty hours of audio and video tapes were stolen from the laboratory on May 28, 1984, by the Animal Liberation Front (ALF), described in their press release as the "Watergate tapes of the animal rights movement". ALF handed the tapes over to PETA. The footage was edited down to 26 minutes by Alex Pacheco and narrated by Ingrid Newkirk, then distributed to the media and Congress. Charles McCarthy, director of the Office for Protection from Research Risks (OPRR), wrote that the film had "grossly overstated the deficiencies in the Head Injury Clinic", but that the OPRR had found serious violations of the Guide for Care and Use of Laboratory Animals. Due to the publicity and the results of several investigations and reports, the lab was closed.

The title of the film comes from a statement made to The Globe and Mail by the head of the clinic, neurosurgeon Thomas Gennarelli, before the raid. He declined to describe his research to the newspaper because, he said, it had "the potential to stir up all sorts of unnecessary fuss."

== Contents of the film ==
The film shows at least one sedated but not anesthetized baboon with his wrists and ankles tied, strapped to table, his head secured with dental stone (Note: Dental stone is a material used in dentistry in the preparation of models and study casts.) inside a helmet. A hydraulic device slams the baboon's head, intended to simulate whiplash. (Note: "The protocol called for sedated baboons to be injured in a machine that simulated the whiplash motion that often inflicts damage to the neck and spine of humans involved in rear-end auto crashes. The nature of the injuries to the animals were to be studied, and the animals unassisted recovery from injury was to be compared with the recovery of animals that received a variety of treatment modalities. The protocol was controversial because it required the infliction of a severe injury on the baboons. Each animal ultimately would be examined in terminal surgery.") After one such injury is sustained, the helmet seems stuck and two researchers use a hammer and screwdriver to dislodge the helmet; a researcher is heard to say "Push!", grunts, then "It's a boy!" as the helmet finally comes loose. One sequence shows that a baboon's ear has been damaged as the helmet is removed: "... like I left a little bit of the ear behind." The footage shows researchers performing electrocautery on an inadequately sedated baboon, smoking cigarettes and pipes during surgery, laughing, and playing loud music. A researcher is seen holding a brain-injured baboon up to the camera, while others speak to the animal: "Don't be shy now, sir, nothing to be afraid of". While one baboon was strapped and waiting in the hydraulic device, the photographer pans to a brain-damaged baboon strapped into a high chair in another corner of the room as he says "Cheerleading in the corner, we have B-10. B-10 wishes his counterpart well. As you can see, B-10 is still alive. B-10 is hoping for a good result".

== Distribution, reception, result ==
The film was distributed to major newspapers and new agencies, as well as Congress. (Note: "[It] was distributed to the New York Times, the Washington Post, segments of the documentary were aired on NBCs "Nightly News" and the Cable News Network (CNN), and two screenings occurred on Capitol Hill.") The broad distribution and the piteous images in the film stirred public outrage. (Note: "the broadcast of Unnecessary Fuss on NBC and CNN alongside newspaper coverage served to arouse public indignation well beyond the geographic range of the ALF action and the civil disobedience at the University of Pennsylvania and place pressure on elected officials to terminate Gennerelli's NIH funding.") Journalist Deborah Blum wrote "It is difficult to put into words just how ugly that brief movie is."

The university's president halted its use of animals in experiments in response to a preliminary report by the National Institutes of Health (NIH).

The Secretary of Health and Human Services, Margaret Heckler, after reading the same preliminary report, and after a four-day sit-in by animal rights activists at NIH, ordered the suspension of the annual $1 million NIH grant supporting the baboon research.

Several investigations and favorable assessments of the research have taken place. The NIH report and a university report were delayed because the activists refused to release the tapes for a year. The university report concurred with the NIH reviewers about the scientific merit of the head injury research, while delineating items where there were violations. (Note: "The committee further agreed that the film "Unnecessary Fuss" gave a distorted view of the conduct of the personnel and the treatment of animals during studies in the Laboratory. While the committee does not condone instances of apparent inappropriate jocularity and offensive comments, it believes they do not reflect the general level of care given the animals or the manner in which the experiments were carried out.") It was noted in the report that since the raid and resulting media exposure, many of the concerns had already been addressed within the university. But in the end, the research lab was shut down.

The biomedical research community expressed its concerns that the government capitulating to activists would put other research at risk of attack by direct action. (Note: "Meanwhile, many members of the biomedical research community have expressed dismay that the government's decision to suspend support for Penn's head injury research project seemed to come in direct response to pressure from animal rights protesters. In a letter to Secretary Heckler, the association of American Medical Colleges and three other academic organizations wrote that appearing to capitulate 'to the demands of an irresponsible advocacy group ... increases the vulnerability of academic institutions to further break-ins, destruction of property, and loss of research data of incalculable value.")

== OPRR investigation ==
An investigation was conducted by 18 veterinarians from the American College of Laboratory Animal Medicine, commissioned by the Office for Protection from Research Risks (OPRR). Charles R. McCarthy, director of the OPRR at the time, wrote that "[d]espite the fact that Unnecessary Fuss grossly overstated the deficiencies in the Head Injury Clinic, OPRR found many extraordinarily serious violations of the Guide for Care and Use of Laboratory Animals ... Furthermore, OPRR found deficiencies in the procedures for care of animals in many other laboratories operated under the auspices of the university."

The violations included that the depth of anesthetic coma was questionable; that most of the animals were not seen by a veterinarian either before or after surgery; survival surgical techniques were not carried out in the required aseptic manner; that the operating theater was not properly cleaned; and that smoking was allowed in the operating theater despite the presence of oxygen tanks.

When PETA made its 26-minute film available, the OPRR initially refused to investigate because the film had been edited from 60 hours of videotape. For over a year PETA refused to release the original footage. When they eventually handed over the unedited material, the OPRR discovered that the footage of the brain damage being inflicted involved just one baboon out of the 150 who had received the whiplash injuries, but the film had given the impression that the brain-damage scenes involved several animals. (Note: "OPRR discovered that the Unnecessary Fuss presented the case history of only 1 of approximately 150 animals that had received whiplash. By clever editing and inaccurate voice over comments, the viewer was led to believe that the inhumane treatment depicted on the film was repeated over and over and over again. In actual fact, one baboon was badly treated, and the film showed that single mistreatment over and over again while the commentator narrated that the mistreatment was repeated on a long series of different animals. In all, OPRR identified about 25 errors in the description of what was taking place. Typical was the statement accompanying film showing an accidental water spill that acid had been carelessly poured on a baboon.")

The OPRR also found deficiencies in other laboratories operated by the university. The university's chief veterinarian was fired, new training programs were initiated, and the university was placed on probation, with quarterly progress reports to OPRR required. (Note: "The university was put on probation by OPRR. The Head Injury Clinic was closed. The chief veterinarian was fired, the administration of animal facilities was consolidated, new training programs for investigators and staff were initiated, and quarterly progress reports to OPRR were required.")
