= Ingrid Newkirk =

British and American animal rights activist (born 1949)

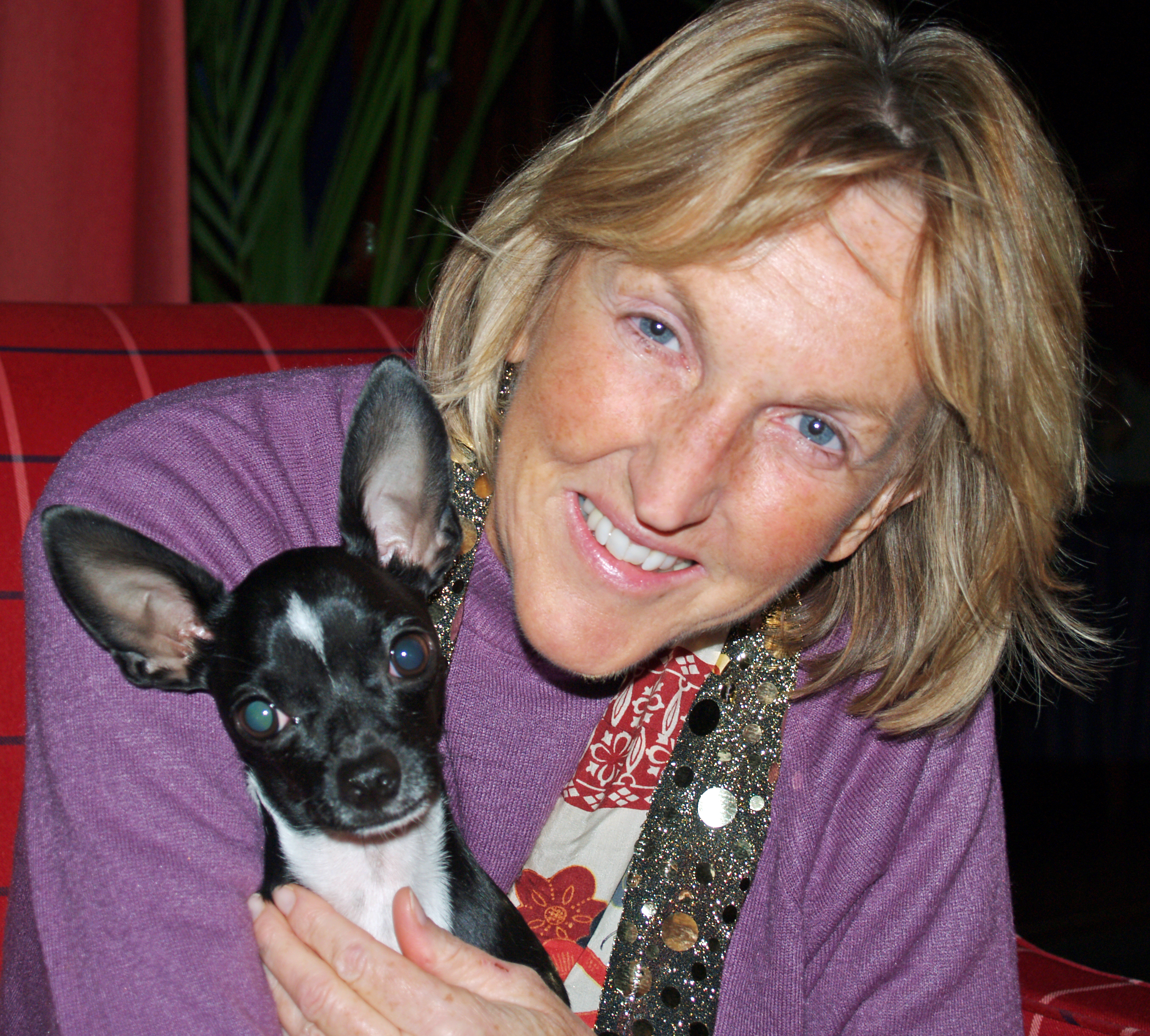
- Newkirk with Little Man, her photographer's chihuahua, during an interview for Wikinews in 2007
- Born: Ingrid Elizabeth Ward; June 11, 1949 (age 77); Kingston upon Thames, Surrey, England
- Citizenship: United Kingdom; United States
- Occupations: Founder and President of People for the Ethical Treatment of Animals
- Spouse: Steve Newkirk (m. 1968; div. 1980)
- Website: Official website

Ingrid Elizabeth Newkirk (née Ward; born June 11, 1949) is a British and American animal rights activist, author and the co-founder of People for the Ethical Treatment of Animals (PETA), the world's largest animal rights organization.

Newkirk founded PETA in March 1980 with fellow animal rights activist Alex Pacheco. They came to public attention in 1981, during what became known as the Silver Spring monkeys case, when Pacheco photographed 17 macaque monkeys being experimented on inside the Institute of Behavioral Research in Silver Spring, Maryland. The case led to the first police raid in the United States on an animal research laboratory and to an amendment in 1985 to the Animal Welfare Act. Since then, Newkirk has led campaigns to stop the use of animals in crash tests, convinced companies to stop testing cosmetics on animals, organized undercover investigations that have led to government sanctions against companies, universities, and entertainers who use animals.

Newkirk has been criticized for her support of actions carried out in the name of the Animal Liberation Front. Newkirk and PETA have also been criticized for euthanizing many of the animals taken into PETA's shelters, including healthy pets, and opposition to the whole notion of pets, and her position that "There's no rational basis for saying that a human being has special rights. A rat is a pig is a dog is a boy," as well as seemingly seeing eradication as a goal. PETA has responded to criticism of its euthanasia practices, saying it only routinely euthanizes animals that are "too unhealthy or too dangerous to place in homes".

== Biography ==
=== Early life ===
Animal liberationists do not separate out the human animal, so there is no rational basis for saying that a human being has special rights. A rat is a pig is a dog is a boy. They're all mammals.

— Ingrid Newkirk, 1985

Newkirk talking to Wikinews about herself and her legacy

Born in Kingston upon Thames, England, in 1949, Newkirk was the only child of Noel Oswald Wodehouse Ward (1917–2000) and Mary Patricia Ward (née Dudley, 1921–2013). Newkirk spent her early years in the Orkney Islands, Scotland and in Ware, Hertfordshire. Her father was a navigational engineer, and when she was seven, the family moved to New Delhi, India, where her father worked for the government, while her mother volunteered for Mother Teresa in a leper colony and a home for unwed mothers. Newkirk attended a convent boarding school in the Himalayas for well-to-do Indian nationals and non-natives. "It was the done thing for a British girl in India", she told Michael Specter for The New Yorker. "But I was the only British girl in this school. I was hit constantly by nuns, starved by nuns. The whole God thing was shoved right down my throat."

Newkirk helped her mother out in the leper colony—packing pills and rolling bandages, stuffing toys for orphans, and feeding strays—and says that this informed her view that anyone in need, including animals, was worthy of concern, along with her mother's advice that it does not matter who suffers, but how. She tells the story of an early experience of trying to rescue an animal, when she heard laughter in the alleyway behind the family home in New Delhi. A group of people had bound a dog's legs, muzzled him, then lowered him into a muddy ditch, laughing as they watched him try to escape. Newkirk asked her servant to bring the dog to her, and tried to get him to drink some water, but someone had packed his throat with mud, and he died in her arms. She told the Financial Times that it was a turning point. (Note: For what happened to the dog, see.: For her comment to the Financial Times, see Glass, Suzanne (7 November 2008). "The Peta principal". Financial Times.) She later attended Ware Grammar School, which was established for members of the Church of England.

When she was eighteen, the family moved to Florida, where her father worked on designing bombing systems for the United States Air Force. It was there that she met her husband, Steve Newkirk; the couple married in 1968 and divorced in 1980. He introduced her to Formula One racing, which—along with sumo wrestling—remains one of her great passions, according to The New Yorker: "It's sex. The first time you hear them rev their engines, my God! That noise goes straight up my spine."

=== Introduction to animal protection ===
Until she was 21, Newkirk had given no thought to animals rights or even vegetarianism. In 1970, she and her husband moved to Poolesville, Maryland, where she studied to become a stockbroker. A neighbor abandoned some kittens, and Newkirk decided to take them to an animal shelter. She told Specter:

When I arrived at the shelter, the woman said, "Come in the back and we will just put them down there."... I thought, How nice—you will set them up with a place to live. So I waited out front for a while, and then I asked if I could go back and see them, and the woman just looked at me and said, "What are you talking about? They are all dead." I just snapped when I heard those kittens were dead. The woman was so rude. The place was a junk heap in the middle of nowhere. It couldn't have been more horrible. For some reason, and even now I don't know what it was, I decided I needed to do something about it. So I thought, I'm going to work here.

Newkirk took a job in the kennels, witnessing the mistreatment of the animals, including physical abuse. Kathy Snow Guillermo writes that Newkirk disinfected kennels by day, and by night studied animal care, animal behavior, and animal-cruelty investigations.

I went to the front office all the time, and I would say, "John is kicking the dogs and putting them into freezers." Or I would say, "They are stepping on the animals, crushing them like grapes, and they don't care." In the end, I would go to work early, before anyone got there, and I would just kill the animals myself. Because I couldn't stand to let them go through that. I must have killed a thousand of them, sometimes dozens every day. Some of those people would take pleasure in making them suffer.

She blew the whistle on the shelter and became an animal-protection officer, first for Montgomery County, Maryland, then for the District of Columbia. She became D.C.'s first female poundmaster, persuading the city to fund veterinary services and to set up an adoption program, an investigations department, and a pet sterilization program. By 1976, she was head of the animal-disease-control division of the District of Columbia Commission on Public Health.

== Newkirk's work with PETA ==
=== Founding of PETA ===
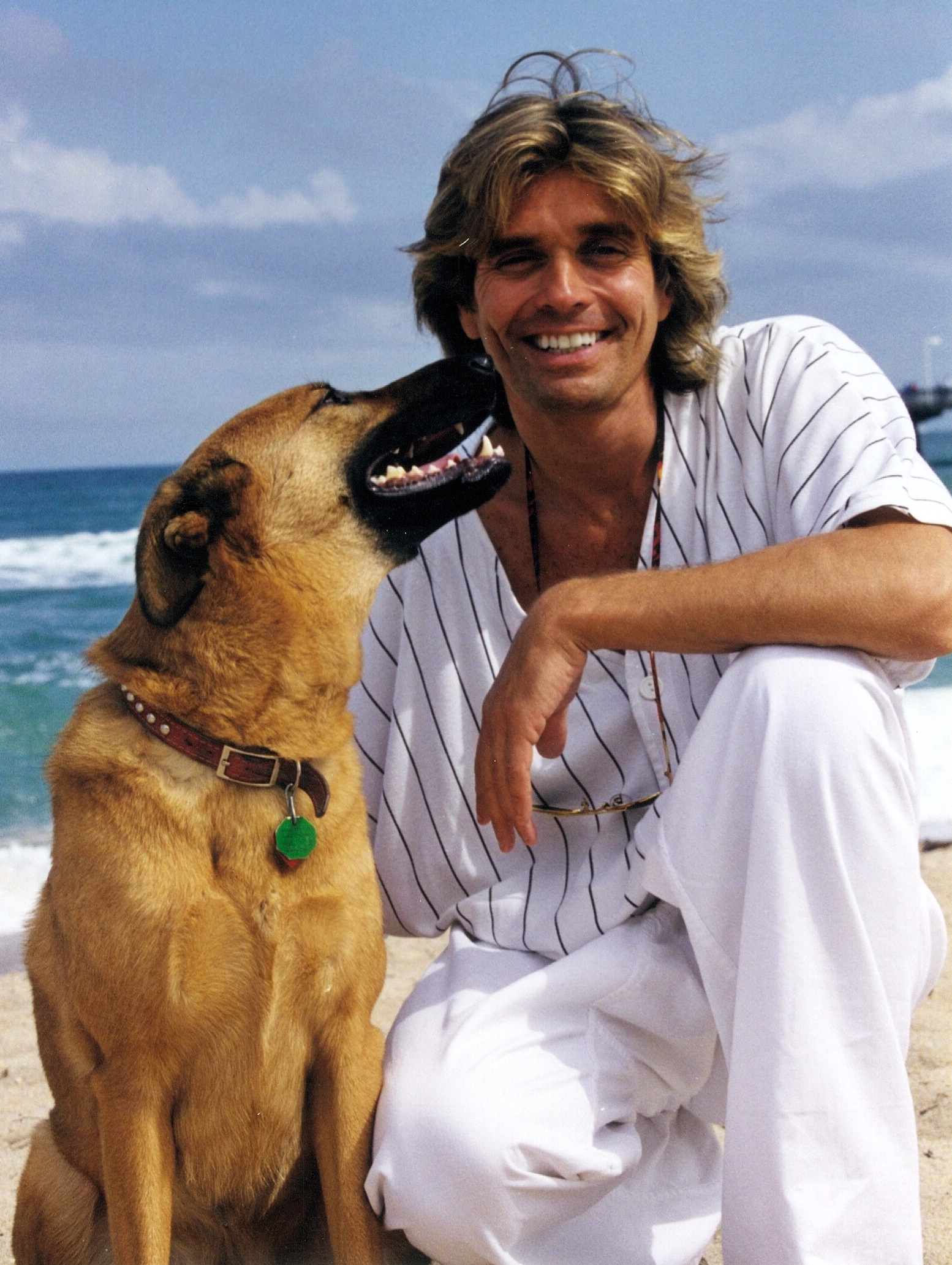
Alex Pacheco

In 1980, Newkirk met Alex Pacheco in a D.C. shelter where he was working as a volunteer. It was Pacheco who introduced Newkirk to the concept of animal rights. Pacheco presented her with a copy of Peter Singer's Animal Liberation (1975). She has said that Singer had put into words what she had felt intuitively for a long time, and she called Pacheco "Alex the Abdul", a name given to messengers in Islamic stories.

The concept of animal rights was at that time almost unheard of in the U.S. The modern animal rights movement had started in England eight years earlier, in 1972, when a group of Oxford University scholars, particularly philosophers, had formed the "Oxford group" to promote the idea that discrimination against individuals on the basis of their species is as irrational as discrimination on the basis of race or sex. In March 1980, Newkirk and Pacheco decided to form a group to educate the American public about these ideas, at first consisting of what Newkirk called "five people in a basement". The couple also fell in love and began living together, although they were very different. Newkirk was older, practical, and very organized, whereas Pacheco spent his time in white painter's overalls eating vegetarian hot dogs straight from the can.

=== Silver Spring monkeys ===
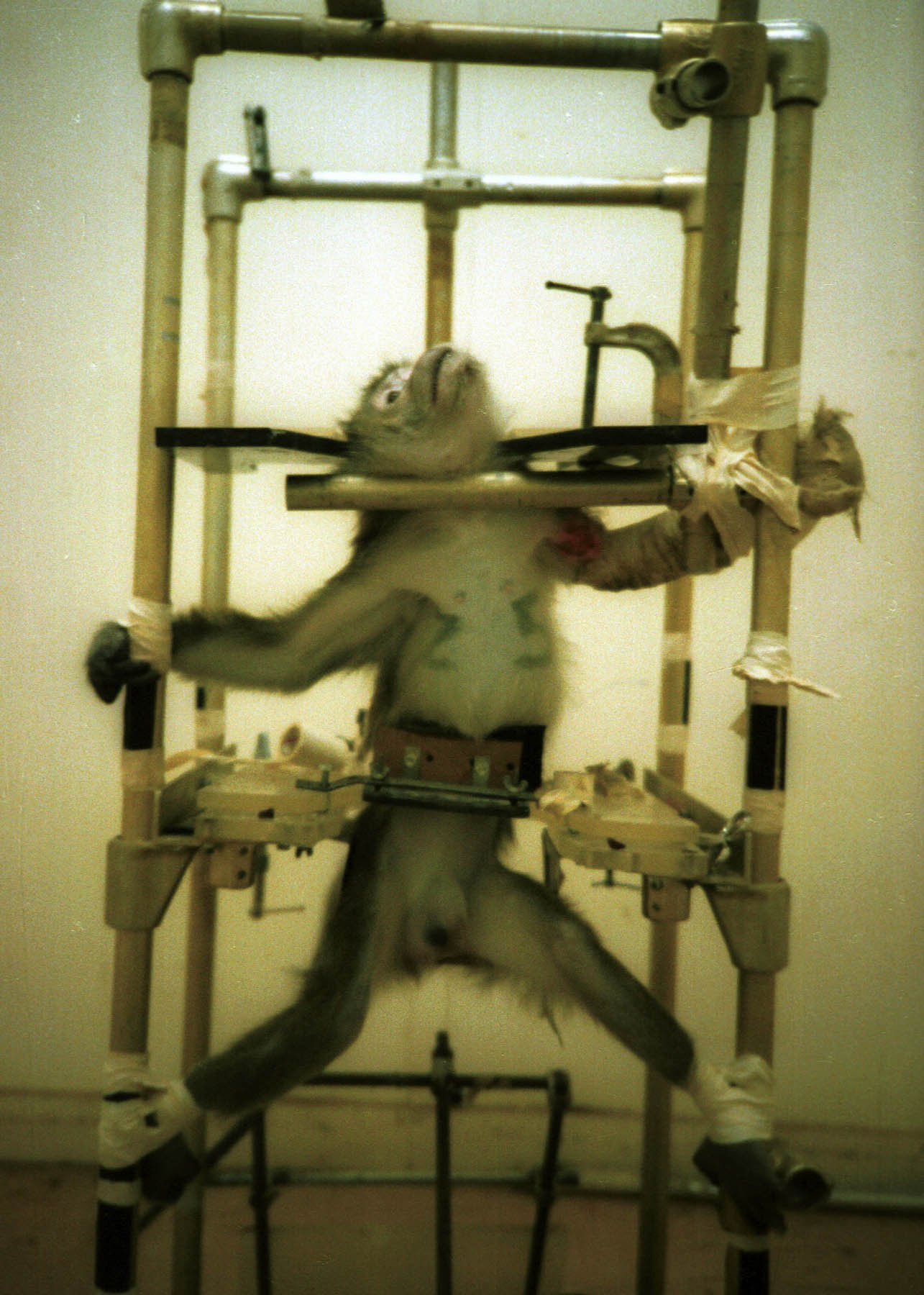
One of the Silver Spring monkeys in a restraint chair

The case of the Silver Spring monkeys, an animal-research controversy that lasted ten years, transformed PETA from just Newkirk, Pacheco, and a small group of friends into an international movement.

In mid-1981, Pacheco took a job as a volunteer inside the Institute of Behavioral Research in Silver Spring, Maryland, so that he and Newkirk would have some firsthand knowledge on which to base their campaigns. Edward Taub, a psychologist, was working there on 17 monkeys. He had cut sensory ganglia that supplied nerves to their arms and legs, then used physical restraint, electric shock, and withholding of food to force them to use the limbs. The idea was to see whether monkeys could be induced to use limbs they could not feel.

Pacheco repeatedly went into the lab at night to take photographs and to escort scientists, including veterinarians and a primatologist, through it to secure their testimony. Newkirk lay crouched on the back seat of a car outside, hidden under a large cardboard box with holes for her eyes, using a walkie-talkie from a toy store to alert Pacheco if anyone else entered the building. The monkeys' living conditions documented by Pacheco were graphically disturbing. Having collected the evidence, Newkirk and Pacheco alerted the police, who raided the lab, removed the monkeys, and charged Taub with 113 counts of cruelty to animals and six counts of failing to provide adequate veterinary care. Taub maintained that he had been set up by Newkirk and Pacheco while he was on vacation and that several of the photographs had been staged. The judge found Taub guilty of six counts of cruelty to animals for failing to provide adequate veterinary care and fined him $3,000. A later jury trial saw five of these counts dismissed, and the sixth was overturned on appeal because of a technicality. The National Institutes of Health, which had funded Taub's research, was among the scientists and other professionals who criticized the conditions in which Taub had kept the monkeys, though the NIH later reversed its decision when the charges against Taub were overturned.

Newkirk and Pacheco found themselves thrust overnight into the public eye. The images of the restrained animals became iconic after The Washington Post published one of them on its front page. It was the first police raid on an animal-research facility in the U.S. and the first conviction (subsequently overturned) of an animal researcher. The controversy led to an amendment to the 1985 Animal Welfare Act, became the first animal-rights case to be heard before the United States Supreme Court, and established PETA as an internationally known animal-rights group, with Newkirk as its outspoken president.

=== Attitude toward the ALF ===
Newkirk has been criticized for publicizing actions carried out in the name of the Animal Liberation Front (ALF). She has said that she does not support criminal acts such as arson:

I do support getting animals out in the same way I would have supported getting human slaves out, child labor, sex slaves, the whole lot. But I don't support burning. I don't support arson. I would rather that these buildings weren't standing, so on some level I understand. I just don't like the idea of that. Maybe that is wishy-washy of me, because I don't want those buildings standing if they are going to hurt anyone. And the ALF has never hurt mice nor mare.

She has been accused of having had advance knowledge of one ALF action. During the 1995 trial of Rod Coronado, in connection with an arson attack at Michigan State University (MSU), U.S. Attorney Michael Dettmer alleged that Newkirk had arranged, in advance of the attack, to have Coronado send her stolen documents from the university and a videotape of the action.

=== Public image ===
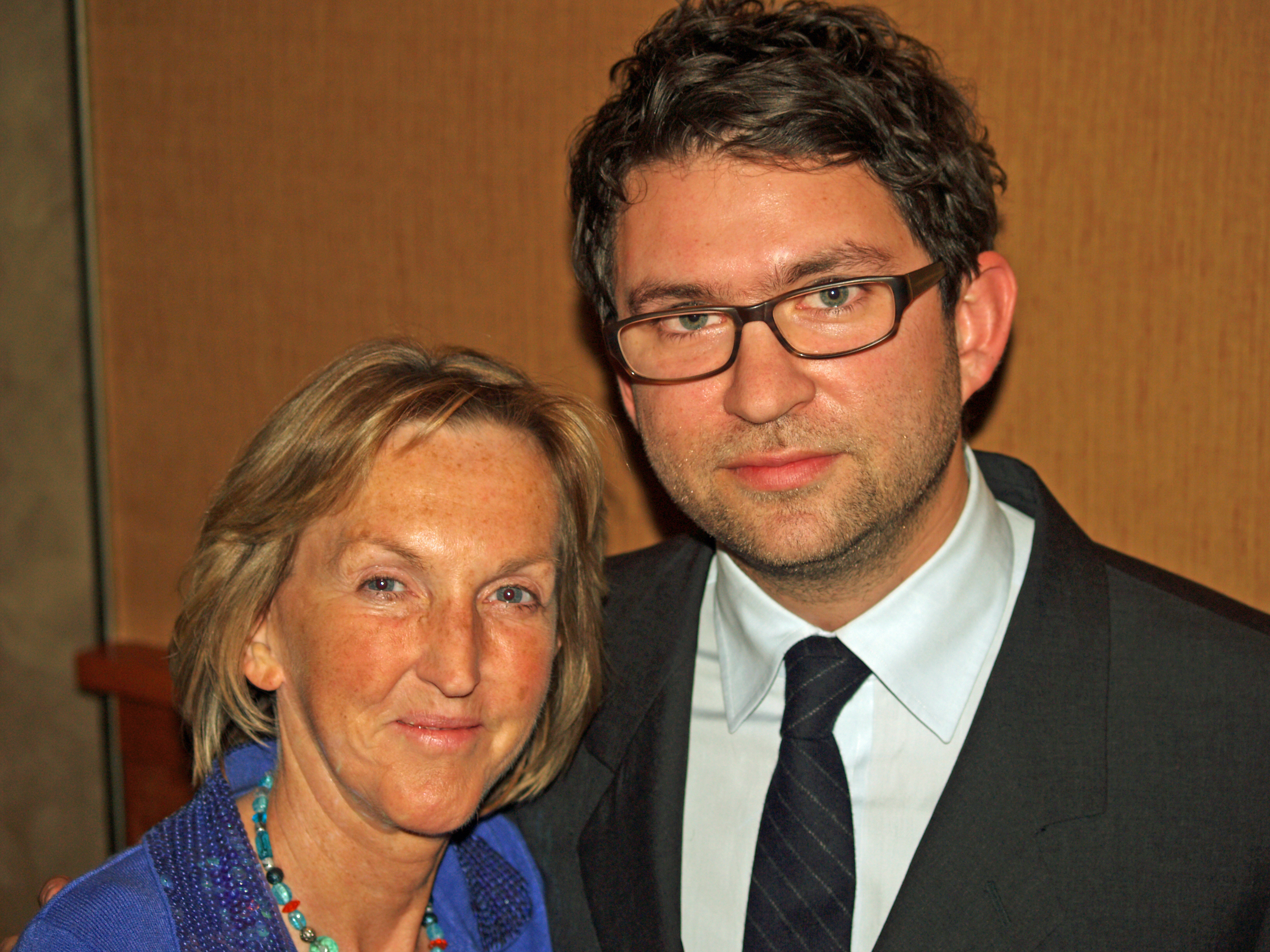
Newkirk and Matthew Galkin, who directed I Am an Animal, the story of Newkirk's life

Newkirk is known, in particular, for the media stunts that she organizes to draw attention to animal-protection issues. In her will, for example, she has asked that her skin be turned into wallets, her feet into umbrella stands, and her flesh into "Newkirk Nuggets", then grilled on a barbecue. "We are complete press sluts", she told The New Yorker in 2003: "It is our obligation. We would be worthless if we were just polite and didn't make any waves."

Newkirks' actions have caused strong feelings, both positive and negative. Michael Specter, who did not see eye to eye with her, wrote:

Newkirk is well read, and she can be witty. When she is not proselytizing, denouncing, or attacking the ninety-nine per cent of humanity that sees the world differently from the way she does, she is good company. After years of detestable public behavior, however, she has the popular image of a monster. Whenever I mentioned her name to friends, they would recoil. And she becomes more disliked with every peta [sic] stunt; she can't walk through an airport without accosting any woman who is wearing fur. She no longer takes vacations in tropical or poor countries like Mexico, because "I spend the whole time rescuing animals from their horrid owners."

Specter also questioned her about a 2003 letter that she wrote to Palestinian leader Yasser Arafat to protest the use of a donkey as a suicide bomber. "We are named People for the Ethical Treatment of Animals", she replied. "There are plenty of other groups that worry about the humans."

Elsewhere, Newkirk has said:

In this business I am very easy to cubby hole. As someone said to me the other day—they had seen the HBO special—and they said, "Are you really a sad obsessed person?" And I thought, No, I'm not really a sad person, except when I lie awake at night in winter thinking about all the animals out without shelter, and then I'm sad! Who wouldn't be? Wouldn't anybody be sad if they have a heart? It's just that I've seen so much.

Newkirk has had celebrity friends and admirers who have spoken highly of her. Sam Simon said in an interview: "I learned about animal rights from my favorite person in the whole world, Ingrid Newkirk at PETA." Also, Alec Baldwin contributed the following blurb to Newkirk's book Making Kind Choices: "Ingrid Newkirk is not only a thoughtful animal rights and environmental activist. She is an inspirational leader. A heroine. A woman upon whom so many depend, around the world, for information and guidance. In a world where all animals, everywhere, are more threatened than ever, Ingrid Newkirk is their champion."

Newkirk has been accused of employing a double standard for her organization's practice of euthanizing animals for which it has neither the space nor resources to shelter. Debra Saunders, a critic of Newkirk, argues that "PETA assails other parties for killing animals for food or research. Then it kills animals – but for really important reasons, such as running out of room". Newkirk explains on PETA's website that, "As long as animals are still purposely bred and people aren't spaying and neutering their companions, open-admission animal shelters and organizations like PETA must do society's dirty work. Euthanasia is not a solution to overpopulation but rather a tragic necessity given the present crisis."

Newkirk and PETA both oppose animal testing out of principle as well as on practical grounds. Specter asked whether she would be opposed to experiments on five thousand rats, or even chimpanzees, if it was needed to cure AIDS. She replied: "Would you be opposed to experiments on your daughter if you knew it would save fifty million people?"

== Awards ==
- Washingtonian of the Year, 1980
- Courage of Conscience Award, 1995
- Shining World Compassion Award, 2007
- Ahimsa Award, 2014
- Peter Singer Prize for Strategies to Reduce the Suffering of Animals, 2016

== Works ==
- Animalkind: Remarkable Discoveries About Animals and Revolutionary New Ways to Show Them Compassion. Co-author Gene Stone, Simon & Schuster (2020). ISBN 978-1501198540
- The PETA Practical Guide to Animal Rights - Simple Acts of Kindness to Help Animals in Trouble. St. Martin's Griffin (2009). ISBN 978-0-312-55994-6
- One Can Make a Difference: Original stories by the Dalai Lama, Paul McCartney, Willie Nelson, Dennis Kucinich, Russell Simmons, Brigitte Bardot ... . Co-author Jane Ratcliffe, Adams Media (2008). ISBN 1-59869-629-7
- Let's Have a Dog Party!: 20 Tail-wagging Celebrations to Share With Your Best Friend. Adams Media Corporation (2007). ISBN 1-59869-149-X
- 50 Awesome Ways Kids Can Help Animals. Warner Books (2006). ISBN 0-446-69828-8
- Making Kind Choices: Everyday Ways to Enhance Your Life Through Earth- and Animal-Friendly Living. St. Martin's Griffin (2005). ISBN 0-312-32993-8
- Peta 2005 Shopping Guide For Caring Consumers: A Guide To Products That Are Not Tested On Animals. Book Publishing Company (2004). ISBN 1-57067-166-4
- Speaking Up For the Animals. DVD, PETA (2004).
- Animal Rights Weekend Warrior. Lantern Books (2003). ISBN 1-59056-048-5
- Free the Animals: The Story of the Animal Liberation Front. Lantern Books (2000). ISBN 1-930051-22-0
- You Can Save the Animals: 251 Simple Ways to Stop Thoughtless Cruelty. Prima Lifestyles (1999). ISBN 0-7615-1673-5
- 250 Things You Can Do to Make Your Cat Adore You. Fireside (1998). ISBN 0-684-83648-3
- Compassionate Cook: Please don't Eat the Animals. Warner Books (1993). ISBN 0-446-39492-0
- Kids Can Save the Animals: 101 Easy Things to Do. Warner Books (1991). ISBN 0-446-39271-5
- A chapter of Lisa Kemmerer's anthology Sister Species: Women, Animals, and Social Justice (2011). ISBN 978-0-252-07811-8

== See also ==
- Women and animal advocacy
- List of animal rights advocates
