= Satya (magazine) =

American monthly magazine

- Categories: Animal rights, vegetarianism, environmentalism, social justice
- Frequency: Monthly
- First issue: June 1994
- Final issue Number: July 2007; 142
- Country: USA
- Based in: New York City
- Language: English
- Website: satyamag.com
- OCLC: 41425102

Satya was an American monthly magazine which covered vegetarianism, animal rights, environmentalism and social justice issues. It was co-founded by Beth Gould and Martin Rowe in 1994 and released its final issue in 2007. Scholar Gary Francione says Satya became the main journal that promoted animal welfare after the demise of The Animals' Agenda in 2002.

The magazine was available free at restaurants and health food stores in New York City and its content was eclectic, blending lifestyle articles with political and intellectual ones, and tackling both animal rights and social justice issues. Satya was named for Mahatma Gandhi's philosophy of Satyagraha and its stated mission was to increase "dialogue among activists from diverse backgrounds and engaging readers in ways to integrate compassion into their daily lives."

Regular contributors to Satya included scholar Rynn Berry and author Mark Hawthorne. Ecofeminist author pattrice jones wrote her 2007 book Aftershock: Confronting Trauma in a Violent World after an article she wrote for the magazine. Among the many other authors and activists who collaborated with Satya are Peter Singer, Carol J. Adams, Matt Ball, Howard Lyman, John Robbins and Will Potter. In 1999, Martin Rowe edited the book The Way of Compassion: Survival Strategies for a World in Crisis based on the work of Satya. It was well received by scholar Richard Foltz.

Authors Pete McCormack and pattrice jones praised Satya's approach and articles. Legal scholar Gary Francione criticized it for focusing on animal welfare politics instead of abolitionist veganism, which, according to him, is the only effective strategy to reduce systematic animal suffering. For their part, moral philosopher Peter Singer and author Bruce Friedrich wrote an article in Satya pointing out that countries with stronger animal welfare laws have also higher rates of veganism and vegetarianism, and that their implementation has placed the issue before millions of people as important.
