= Learned non-use =

Learned suppression of movement in a limb

Learned non-use of a limb is a learning phenomenon whereby movement is suppressed initially due to adverse reactions and failure of any activity attempted with the affected limb, which then results in the suppression of behavior. Continuation of this response results in persisting tendency and consequently, the individual never learns that the limb may have become potentially useful. By constraining the less-affected limb there is a change in motivation, which overcomes the learned nonuse of the more-affected limb.

The principles of constraint-induced movement therapy (CIMT) used in stroke patients are based on the idea of the reversal of learned non-use. CIMT uses constrained movement of the less-affected limb and intensive training of the paretic arm to counter-condition the nonuse of the more-affected arm learned in the acute and early sub-acute periods. More recently, clinical versions of CIMT - called "modified constraint induced movement therapy" (mCIT) - have been produced that are administered over a longer time period than CIMT (usually 10 weeks). While offering the same effectiveness and cortical changes as CIMT, these versions are better tolerated, and can be integrated into traditional therapy clinics and reimbursement parameters.

== See also ==
- Silver Spring monkeys
