= Constraint-induced movement therapy =

Rehabilitation program for cases of CNS damage

- Specialty: Neurology

Constraint-induced movement therapy (CI, CIT, or CIMT) is a form of rehabilitation therapy that improves upper extremity function in stroke and other central nervous system damage patients by increasing the use of their affected upper limb. Due to its high duration of treatment, the therapy has been found to frequently be infeasible when attempts have been made to apply it to clinical situations, and both patients and treating clinicians have reported poor compliance and concerns with patient safety. In the United States, the high duration of the therapy has also made the therapy not able to get reimbursed in most clinical environments.

However, distributed or "modified" CIT protocols have enjoyed similar efficacy to CIMT, have been able to be administered in outpatient clinical environments, and have enjoyed high success rates internationally.

== Types of constraint ==
The focus of CIMT is to combine restraint of the unaffected limb and intensive use of the affected limb. Types of restraints include a sling or triangular bandage, a splint, a sling combined with a resting hand splint, a half glove, and a mitt. Determination of the type of restraint used for therapy depends on the required level of safety vs. intensity of therapy. Some restraints restrict the wearer from using their hand and wrist, though allow use of their non-involved upper extremity for protection by extension of their arm in case of loss of balance or falls. However, restraints that allow some use of the non-involved extremity will result in less intensive practice because the non-involved arm can still be used to complete tasks. Constraint typically consists of placing a mitt on the unaffected hand or a sling or splint on the unaffected arm, forcing the use of the affected limb with the goal of promoting purposeful movements when performing functional tasks. The use of the affected limb is called shaping.

== Duration and timing of "traditional" versus "modified" CI therapy programs ==
Traditionally, CIMT involves restraining the unaffected arm in patients with hemiparetic stroke or hemiparetic cerebral palsy (HCP) for 90% of waking hours while engaging the affected limb in a range of everyday activities However, given concerns with compliance (both among patients and clinicians), reimbursement, and patient safety, studies have varied on hours of restraint per day and length of therapy. More specifically, CIMT involves the person performing supervised structured tasks with the affected limb 6 hours a day for 10 days over a 14-day period, in addition to wearing the restrictive mitt or sling for 90% of waking hours.

Alternatively, modified constraint induced movement therapy protocols have been found to be equally effective as "traditional" CI therapy protocols. The most established, commonly used, and evidence based form of modified CI therapy that has been found to be effective in improving motor control asks patients to attend goal directed therapy sessions lasting a half hour per day, on 3 days/week over a 10-week period. Concurrently, patients wear a mitt on the less affected limb for 5 hours/weekday during the same 10-week period. In addition to providing more practice with the affected limb than "traditional" CI therapy over the 10-week period, the regimen is in greater accord with outpatient therapy regimens around the world, is less costly, and the efficacy has been shown to be comparable to a more intensive CI therapy schedule.

Practitioners say that stroke survivors disabled for many years have recovered the use of their limbs using CIMT. However, it has been shown that receiving CIMT early on (3–9 months post-stroke) will result in greater functional gains than receiving delayed treatment (15–21 months post-stroke), with no benefits associated with its administration acutely (< 3 months post stroke). However, modified CI therapy protocols have shown larger treatment effects when administered in the acute phase.

== Mechanism of change ==
CIMT was developed by Edward Taub of the University of Alabama at Birmingham. Taub argues that, after a stroke, the patient stops using the affected limb because they are discouraged by the difficulty. As a result, a process that Taub calls "learned non-use" sets in, furthering the deterioration. Learned non-use is a type of negative feedback. Individuals are unable to move their affected limb or the movements are inefficient and clumsy and in response to this a suppression of movement occurs. It is this process that CIMT seeks to reverse. The American Stroke Association has written that Taub's therapy is "at the forefront of a revolution" in what is regarded possible in terms of recovery for stroke survivors.

As a result of the patient engaging in repetitive exercises with the affected limb, the brain grows new neural pathways. This change in the brain is referred to as cortical reorganization or neuroplasticity. One study by Deluca et al. showed that using transcranial magnetic stimulation (TMS) that the excitable cortex of the affected cortex in adults patients with HCP doubled in size after 12 days of therapy. Recently, the possible benefits of cortical reorganization has led to studies of CIMT on children because neuroplasticity is even greater among children than adults. Particular interest is growing in CIMT for children who have cerebral palsy where one arm is more affected than the other.

As with adults, however, the plausibility of administering CIMT in pediatric models is low except in specialized, for profit, clinics, due to its intensive parameters, and it has been noted that compliance is especially low in most community-dwelling children.

== Application of constraint-induced movement therapy ==
Both CIMT and modified CIMT may be applicable to up to 20–25 percent of stroke patients, and the amount of improvement produced by either regimen appears to diminish as the initial motor ability of the patient decreases. Both CIMT and modified CI therapy has been shown to be an effective means of stroke rehabilitation regardless of the level of initial motor ability, amount of chronicity, amount of prior therapy, side of hemiparesis, or infarct location. This suggests that plasticity may work irrespective of the pathways in the damaged motor network. Although, due to the duration of this treatment, patients who have had profound upper extremity paralysis from their condition are normally not eligible for constraint-induced upper extremity training. A consistent exclusion criterion for CIMT and modified CI therapy has been the inability to perform voluntary wrist and finger extension in the involved hand. As stated above, this criterion typically limits the population eligible for this family of therapies to 20–25% of the entire stroke population.

CIAT (Constraint Induced Aphasia Therapy) is an adaptation of CIMT for people with Aphasia. It can be used for clients with either expressive or receptive aphasia. Like CIMT, treatment is intensive and usually occurs over a ten-day period for several hours per day. In CIAT, patient must use verbal communication without gestures or pointing in order communicate. The constraints are placed on the use of gestures with the aim of improving verbal communication. Also like CIMT, CIAT has been shown to not be feasible in most clinical environments due to its parameters and distributed protocols are now being investigated.

Both constraint-induced movement therapy (CIMT) and modified CI therapy coupled with intensive and varied exercise training has proven to be effective in reducing spasticity and increasing function of the hemiplegic upper extremity in chronic stroke patients.

The effects of constraint-induced movement therapy and its modified versions have been found to improve movements that not only remain stable for months after the completion of therapy, but translate well to improvements of everyday functional task.

== Limitations to implementation ==
As stated earlier, the "traditional" form of constraint-induced movement therapy (CIMT) has not been incorporated as part of standard practice for the rehabilitation of the hemiplegic upper extremity. Most notably, concerns have been cited over the reimbursement, intensity, and both patient and clinician compliance with the therapy, especially in light of equally-effective, less intense alternative forms. Concerns have also been raised over the generalizability of the results obtained from research, as selection criteria for CIMT research has excluded patients with a moderate or more severe stroke, due to balance problems, serious cognitive deficits, and global aphasia, which may reduce understanding of safety instructions and interfere with a patient's ability to communicate difficulties.

The cost of resources needed to conduct CIMT treatment protocol are high. Costs are generated due to the intensity of therapy required for CIMT, as participants typically receive up to 6 hours of one-on-one therapy at least 5 days per week for 2 weeks. CIMT can be prohibitively expensive for patients paying out-of-pocket or for publicly funded health care systems attempting to make this program available to all eligible stroke survivors.

Therapist apprehension directed at safety issues with constraint use, lack of facilities, the cost of providing one-on-one therapy sessions, and the opportunity costs associated with the therapist's inability to see and treat other patients during that time has contributed to the resistance of adopting the CIMT protocol.

The patient's ability to tolerate the intensity and duration of the therapy sessions is a limiting factor to protocol adoption. Stroke patients have commonly expressed the length of time wearing the constraint and time-consuming hours of therapy as reasons they wish not to participate.

While the CIMT protocol results in improved function in its target population, it is unknown whether the combination of constraint and therapy is necessary to achieve the outcome seen or whether the benefit is due to exposure to high-intensity, task-specific activities focused on the use of the more affected limb. Additionally, the therapy only appears to work on stroke survivors with some initial movement in their wrists and fingers; about 25% of the entire population of stroke survivors.

== See also ==
- Neuroplasticity
- Silver Spring Monkeys
