= Animal rights by country or territory =

Worldwide laws on the official recognition of non-human animal sentience and suffering. National recognition of animal sentience Partial recognition of animal sentience National recognition of animal suffering Partial recognition of animal suffering No recognition of animal sentience or suffering Unknown

Animal rights vary greatly among countries and territories. Such laws range from the legal recognition of non-human animal sentience to the absolute lack of any anti-cruelty laws, with no regard for animal.

== Overview ==
As of November 2019, 32 countries have formally recognized non-human animal sentience. These are: Austria, Australia, Belgium, Bulgaria, Chile, Croatia, Cyprus, the Czech Republic, Denmark, Estonia, Finland, France, Germany, Greece, Hungary, Ireland, Italy, Latvia, Lithuania, Luxembourg, Malta, New Zealand, the Netherlands, Poland, Portugal, Romania, Spain, Slovakia, Slovenia, Sweden, Switzerland, and the United Kingdom.

The Universal Declaration on Animal Welfare (UDAW) is a proposed global initiative designed to acknowledge animal sentience, prevent cruelty, minimize suffering, and establish welfare standards for animals. It applies to various categories, including farm animals, pets, animals used in scientific research, working animals, wildlife, and those involved in recreational activities.

The Great Ape Project is currently campaigning to have the United Nations endorse a World Declaration on Great Apes, which would extend to non-human great apes the protection of three basic interests: the right to life, the protection of individual liberty, and the prohibition of torture. Six countries currently ban the use of great apes for scientific research, and Austria is the only country in the world to ban experiments on lesser apes.

In 2009, Bolivia became the first country to banish animal abuse and harm in circuses. The United States of America is the only country in the world that has banned killing horses for consumption, and India has banned killing cows for consumption in some of its states.

Cow is the national animal of Nepal, and cow slaughter is a punishable offense as per the prevailing law.

In 2014, the Jain pilgrimage destination of Palitana City in Indian state of Gujarat became the first city in the world to be legally vegetarian. It has banned buying and selling meat, fish, and eggs, as well as related jobs, such as fishing and animal farming.

== Global animal rights maps ==
Food production

World laws on battery cages

World laws on battery cages Nationwide ban on battery cages Some subnational bans on battery cages Nationwide phaseout of battery cages in progress Battery cages legal No data

World laws on beak trimming

World laws on beak trimming: Nationwide ban on beak trimming / Some subnational bans on beak trimming; Beak trimming legal / No data

World laws on chick culling

World laws on chick culling: Ban on all chick culling / Grinding chicks illegal, gassing chicks legal; Planned ban on all chick culling / Chick culling legal, no ban planned; No data

World laws on foie gras production

World laws on foie gras production: Countries and regions that ban foie gras production / Main foie gras-producing countries and regions

World laws on stunning animals during ritual slaughter

World laws on stunning animals during ritual slaughter: Stunning not required / Post-cut stunning required; Simultaneous stunning required / Pre-cut stunning required; Ritual slaughter banned / No data

Legal status of whaling

Legal status of whaling: IWC states that ban whaling (since 1986) / IWC states with aboriginal whaling; IWC states with commercial whaling / Non-IWC states with aboriginal whaling; Non-IWC states with commercial whaling / Non-IWC states without whaling

Clothing and cosmetics

World laws on cosmetic animal testing

Worldwide laws regarding testing cosmetics on animals: Nationwide ban on all cosmetic testing on animals / Partial ban on cosmetic testing on animals^{1}; Ban on the sale of cosmetics tested on animals / No ban on any cosmetic testing on animals; Unknown^{1}some methods of testing are excluded from the ban or the laws vary within the country

Entertainment

World laws on bullfighting

World laws on bullfighting: Nationwide ban on bullfighting / Nationwide ban on bullfighting, but some designated local traditions exempted; Some subnational bans on bullfighting / Bullfighting without killing bulls in the ring legal (Portuguese style or 'bloodless'); Bullfighting with killing bulls in the ring legal (Spanish style) / No data

World laws on cockfighting

World laws on cockfighting: Nationwide ban on cockfighting / Nationwide ban on cockfighting, but some designated local traditions exempted; Some subnational bans on cockfighting / Cockfighting legal; No data

World laws on dog fighting

World laws on dog fighting: Nationwide ban on dog fighting / Some subnational bans on dog fighting; Dog fighting legal / No data

World laws on dolphinariums / marine mammal captivity

World laws on dolphinariums / marine mammal captivity: Nationwide ban on dolphinariums/marine mammal captivity / De facto nationwide ban on dolphinariums/marine mammal captivity due to strict regulations; Some subnational bans on dolphinariums/marine mammal captivity / Dolphinariums/marine mammal captivity are currently being phased out ahead of a nationwide ban; Dolphinariums/marine mammal captivity legal / No data

Laws banning the use of animals in circuses

Worldwide laws on animal use in circuses: Nationwide ban / Partial or local bans (Note: Certain animals are excluded or the laws vary internally.); Ban on import/export / No ban; Unknown

World laws on goose pulling

World laws on goose pulling: Goose pulling discontinued; live goose pulling until 20th century / Dead goose pulling; live goose pulling banned in 20th century; Dummy and dead goose pulling; local bans on dead goose pulling in 21st century / Dummy goose pulling; live goose pulling banned in 20th century, dead goose pulling banned in 2019; No data

== Council of Europe convention maps ==
European Convention for the Protection of Animals during International Transport (1968 & 2003)

European Convention for the Protection of Animals during International Transport (1968 original): Signed and ratified / Acceded or succeeded; Only signed / Not signed (CoE member states); Not signed (non-CoE member states) / Denounced in favour of 2003 revised convention

European Convention for the Protection of Animals during International Transport (2003 revision): Signed and ratified / Acceded or succeeded; Only signed / Not signed (CoE member states); Not signed (non-CoE member states)

European Convention for the Protection of Animals kept for Farming Purposes (1976)

European Convention for the Protection of Animals kept for Farming Purposes: Signed and ratified / Acceded or succeeded; Only signed / Not signed (CoE member states); Not signed (non-CoE member states)

European Convention for the Protection of Animals for Slaughter (1979)

European Convention for the Protection of Animals for Slaughter: Signed and ratified / Acceded or succeeded; Only signed / Not signed (CoE member states); Not signed (non-CoE member states)

Berne Convention on the Conservation of European Wildlife and Natural Habitats (1979)

Berne Convention on the Conservation of European Wildlife and Natural Habitats: Signed and ratified / Acceded or succeeded; Only signed / Not signed (CoE member states); Not signed (non-CoE member states)

European Convention for the Protection of Vertebrate Animals used for Experimental and other Scientific Purposes (1986)

European Convention for the Protection of Vertebrate Animals used for Experimental and other Scientific Purposes: Signed and ratified / Acceded or succeeded; Only signed / Not signed (CoE member states); Not signed (non-CoE member states)

European Convention for the Protection of Pet Animals (1987)

European Convention for the Protection of Pet Animals: Signed and ratified / Acceded or succeeded; Only signed / Not signed (CoE member states); Not signed (non-CoE member states)

== Principal laws on animal rights ==
General legislation
Country	Recognition of animal sentience	Recognition of animal suffering	Anti-cruelty laws meet OIE standards	Any laws against animal cruelty	Support at the United Nations (Note: These countries have pledged to support the Universal Declaration on Animal Welfare.)
Algeria	No	No	No	Yes -unenforced	No
Angola	No	No	No	No	No
Argentina	Yes	Yes	Yes	Yes	No
Australia	Yes	Yes	Partial - varies internally	Yes	No
Austria	Yes	Yes	Yes	Yes	Partial - support from various internal departments
Azerbaijan	No	No	No	No	No
Belarus	No	No	No	No	No
Belgium	Yes	Yes	Unknown	Yes	Partial - support from the Minister for Agriculture
Bosnia and Herzegovina	No	Yes	No	Yes	No
Botswana	No	No	No	Yes	No
Brazil	Yes	Yes	Yes	Yes	Yes
Bulgaria	Yes	Yes	Unknown	Yes	Partial - support from the Minister for Agriculture
Cambodia	No	No	No	No	Yes
Canada	Yes	Yes	No	Yes	Yes
Chile	Yes	Yes	No	Yes	Yes
China	No	No	No	No	No
Colombia	Yes	Yes	Yes	Yes	No
Costa Rica	No	Yes	Unknown	Yes	Yes
Croatia	Yes	Yes	Unknown	Yes	No
Cyprus	Yes	Yes	Unknown	Yes	Partial - support from the Minister for Agriculture
Czech Republic	Yes	Yes	Unknown	Yes	Partial - support from the Minister for Agriculture
Democratic Republic of Congo	No	No	No	No	No
Denmark	Yes	Yes	Yes	Yes	Partial - support from the Minister for Food
Egypt	No	Yes	No	Yes -unenforced	No
Eritrea	No	No	No	No	No
Estonia	Yes	Yes	Unknown	Yes	Partial - support from the Minister for Agriculture
Ethiopia	No	No	No	Yes	No
Fiji	No	Yes	No	Yes	Yes
Finland	Yes	Yes	Unknown	Yes	Partial - support from the Minister for Agriculture
France	Yes	Yes	Yes	Yes	Partial - support from the Minister for Agriculture
Germany	Yes	Yes	Yes	Yes	Partial - support from the Minister for Agriculture
Greece	Yes	Yes	Unknown	Yes	Partial - support from the Minister for Food
Hong Kong	No	Yes	No	Yes	—N/a (China responsible for foreign affairs)
Hungary	Yes	Yes	Unknown	Yes	Partial - support from the Minister for Agriculture
India	No	Yes	No	Yes	Partial - support from the Animal Welfare Board
Indonesia	Partial - mental health recognized	Yes	No	Yes	Partial - support from the Minister for Agriculture
Iran	No	No	No	No	No
Ireland	Yes	Yes	Unknown	Yes	Partial - support from the Minister for Agriculture
Italy	Yes	Yes	No	Yes	Partial - support from the Minister for Agriculture
Japan	No	Yes	No	Yes	No
Kazakhstan	No	No	No	Yes	No
Kenya	No	Yes	No	Yes	No
Latvia	Yes	Yes	Unknown	Yes	Partial - support from the Minister for Agriculture
Lebanon	Partial	Yes	Yes	Yes	No
Lesotho	No	No	No	Yes -unenforced	No
Lithuania	Yes	Yes	Unknown	Yes	Partial - support from the Minister for Agriculture
Luxembourg	Yes	Yes	Unknown	Yes	Partial - support from the Minister for Agriculture
Madagascar	No	No	No	No	No
Malawi	No	Yes	No	Yes - unenforced	No
Malaysia	No	Yes	No	Yes	Yes
Maldives	No	No	Unknown	Yes	No
Mali	No	No	No	Yes	No
Malta	Yes	Yes	Unknown	Yes	Partial - support from the Minister for Resources
Mauritius	No	No	No	Yes	No
Mexico	Partial - varies internally	Yes	No	Yes	No
Mongolia	No	No	No	No	No
Morocco	No	Yes	No	Yes -unenforced	No
Mozambique	No	No	No	No	No
Myanmar	No	Yes	No	Yes	No
Namibia	No	Yes	No	Yes	No
New Zealand	Yes	Yes	Yes	Yes	Yes
Netherlands	Yes	Yes	Yes	Yes	Yes
Niger	No	Partial - domesticated animals only	No	Yes	No
North Korea	No	No	No	Yes	No
Norway	Partial - mental health recognized	Yes	No	Yes	No
Pakistan	No	Yes	No	Yes	No
Paraguay	No	Yes	No	Yes	No
Peru	No	Yes	No	Yes	Yes
Philippines	Partial - mental health recognized	Yes	No	Yes	Partial - support from various internal departments
Poland	Yes	Yes	No	Yes	Partial - support from the Minister for Agriculture
Portugal	Yes	Yes	No	Yes	Partial - support from the Minister for Agriculture
Romania	Yes	Yes	No	Yes	Partial - support from the Minister for Agriculture
Russia	No	No	No	Yes	No
Saudi Arabia	No	Yes	No	Yes	No
Seychelles	No	No	No	Yes	Yes
Singapore	No	Yes	Unknown	Yes	Unknown
Slovakia	Yes	Yes	Unknown	Yes	Partial - support from the Minister for Agriculture
Slovenia	Yes	Yes	Unknown	Yes	Partial - support from the Minister for Agriculture
South Africa	No	Yes	No	Yes	No
South Korea	No	Yes	No	Yes	No
Spain	Yes	Yes	No	Yes	Partial - support from the Minister for Agriculture
Swaziland	No	Yes	No	Yes -unenforced	No
Sweden	Yes	Yes	Yes	Yes	Yes
Switzerland	Yes	Yes	Yes	Yes	Yes
Tanzania	Partial - some animals excluded	Yes	No	Yes	Yes
Thailand	No	Yes	No	Yes	Partial - support from various internal departments
Turkey	Partial - mental health recognized	Yes	No	Yes	No
Ukraine	No	Yes	No	Yes	No
United Kingdom	Yes	Yes	Yes	Yes	Partial - support from various internal departments
United States	Partial - varies internally	Yes	Partial - varies internally	Yes	Partial - support from various internal departments
Uruguay	No	Yes	No	Yes	No
Venezuela	No	Yes	No	Yes	No
Vietnam	No	No	No	No	No
Zambia	No	Yes	No	Yes	No
Zimbabwe	No	Yes	No	Yes	No

== See also ==
- Human rights
- List of animal rights advocates
- List of international animal welfare conventions
- Overview of discretionary invasive procedures on animals
