= European Convention for the Protection of Vertebrate Animals used for Experimental and other Scientific Purposes =

1986 animal welfare treaty

Animal experimentation convention
European Convention for the Protection of Vertebrate Animals used for Experimental and other Scientific Purposes
- Signed: 18 March 1986
- Location: Strasbourg, France
- Effective: 1 January 1991
- Condition: 4 ratifications by Council of Europe member states
- Signatories: 28 states + EU
- Ratifiers: 22 states + EU
- Depositary: Secretary General of the Council of Europe
- Citations: CETS No. 123
- Languages: English and French

European Convention for the Protection of Vertebrate Animals used for Experimental and other Scientific Purposes: Signed and ratified / Acceded or succeeded; Only signed / Not signed (CoE member states); Not signed (non-CoE member states)

The European Convention for the Protection of Vertebrate Animals used for Experimental and other Scientific Purposes, sometimes simply referred to as the animal experimentation convention or laboratory animals convention, is an animal welfare treaty of the Council of Europe regarding animal testing, adopted on 18 March 1986 in Strasbourg, and effective since 1 January 1991.

== Development ==
Due to increased public awareness and debate about animal welfare in the 1960s, the Council of Europe became more concerned with the wellbeing of animals, and developed a number of conventions based on animal welfare recommendations resulting from the latest scientific research in applied ethology.

For the development of the European Convention for the Protection of Vertebrate Animals Used for Experimental and Other Scientific Purposes, the Council of Europe closely cooperated with the Commission of the European Union (before 1992 the European Communities), and the Commission adopted the very similar Directive 86/609/EEC (revised in 2008–2010 to Directive 2010/63/EU), implementing the convention in EU law. Although the laboratory animals convention did not add much to existing national legislation already in force in some CoE member states in 1986, it had two important effects. Firstly, it led to the recognition by all CoE member states that animal suffering in experimentation was a problem, that could partly be solved, and that this should be done at the international level. Secondly, it saw a Europe-wide codification of norms, standards and principles by governmental experts, animal welfare organisations, scientific researchers, and the industries involved.

A Protocol of Amendment was adopted on 22 June 1998.

== Contents ==
There is a strong overlap between the European Convention for the Protection of Vertebrate Animals used for Experimental and other Scientific Purposes on the one hand, and Directive 86/609/EEC (in 2010 replaced by Directive 2010/63/EU) on the other, as they were developed in close cooperation between the Council of Europe and the European Communities. They include the following provisions:

- Which species may and may not be used for testing, and which species are entitled to protection during testing (namely, live non-human vertebrates, with some exceptions).
- Which activities may and may not be performed with the designated species for testing, and under which conditions to avoid or reduce pain, suffering, distress or lasting harm.
- Which reasons are valid for animal testing:
  - Disease prevention in humans, animals or plants
  - Diagnosis or treatment of diseases in humans, animals or plants
  - Analysis of physiological conditions in humans, animals or plants
  - Environmental protection
  - Scientific research (not allowed by the EEC Directive)
  - Education and training, and forensic inquiries (not allowed by the EEC Directive)
- Compliance with the Three Rs principles
- What to do with animals after the experiment is over (killed 'humanely' to relieve suffering, re-used if capable and appropriate, or released).
- Regulation of how competent persons are authorised to carry out research.
- Regulation of qualifications of researchers and governmental inspections.
- Regulation of breeding, feeding and caring of laboratory animals.
- Publication of research performance and results, the effect on the test subjects, and recommendations on how to further reduce animal suffering in future experiments.

== Status ==
The animal experimentation convention and its 1998 Protocol of Amendment form part of the core of European legislation concerning animal welfare, which also includes the European Convention for the Protection of Animals kept for Farming Purposes (1976, with its 1992 Protocol of Amendment), the European Convention for the Protection of Animals for Slaughter (1979), the European Convention for the Protection of Animals during International Transport (adopted 1968, revised 2003), and the European Convention for the Protection of Pet Animals (1987).

As of May 2021, 22 states and the European Union have ratified the animal experimentation convention, and six states have only signed it.

== See also ==
- Animal law
- Animal rights by country or territory
- Cruelty to animals
- List of Council of Europe treaties
- List of international animal welfare conventions
