= European Convention for the Protection of Animals kept for Farming Purposes =

1976 animal welfare treaty of the Council of Europe, adopted in Strasbourg

Farm Animal Convention
European Convention for the Protection of Animals kept for Farming Purposes
- Signed: 10 March 1976
- Location: Strasbourg, France
- Effective: 10 September 1978
- Condition: 4 ratifications by Council of Europe member states
- Signatories: 34 states + EU
- Ratifiers: 33 states + EU
- Depositary: Secretary General of the Council of Europe
- Citations: CETS No. 87
- Languages: English and French

European Convention for the Protection of Animals kept for Farming Purposes: Signed and ratified / Acceded or succeeded; Only signed / Not signed (CoE member states); Not signed (non-CoE member states)

The European Convention for the Protection of Animals kept for Farming Purposes, also known as the Farm Animal Convention, is an animal welfare treaty of the Council of Europe, adopted on 10 March 1976 in Strasbourg, and effective since 10 September 1978.

== Contents ==
The main provisions of the Farm Animal Convention concern:

- definitions of the concepts of 'animals' and modern intensive farming systems,
- the general principles governing the living conditions of farm animals, which must benefit from housing, food and care appropriate to their physiological and ethological needs,
- the need to take the necessary measures to avoid unnecessary suffering to the animals.

== Development ==
The Council of Europe became more concerned about animal welfare in the 1960s due to increased public awareness and debate, and adopted a convention of minimum requirements for animal transport in 1968. Next, the Parliamentary Assembly of the Council of Europe requested the Committee of Ministers to draw up a farm animal welfare convention for general principles on housing animals in modern intensive farming systems, for which the committee established an ad hoc committee of experts from member states in 1971. This eventually resulted in the European Convention for the Protection of Animals kept for Farming Purposes in 1976.

In 1979 a Standing Committee was established to produce recommendations for specific species, such as cattle (1988), poultry (1986, 1995), pigs (1986, 2005), sheep and goats (1992), calves (1993), ratites (1993), ducks, geese and fur animals (1999). Unlike the other European animal welfare conventions (see Status below), the Farm Animal Convention has the character of a framework law, is more open to further elaboration, and allows the Standing Committee to develop detailed rules with the same legal status as the convention itself. Intergovernmental and non-governmental organisations (including the ISAE, WSPA, Eurogroup for Animals, the European Confederation of Agriculture and the Federation of Veterinarians of Europe) are invited to provide experts on applied ethology for consultation sessions, which are then used to develop new rules. Parties to the Convention have to translate the recommendations into national legislation and European Union law.

On 6 February 1992, a Protocol of Amendment was added 'to apply also to certain aspects of developments in the area of animal husbandry, in particular in respect of biotechnology, and to the killing of animals on the farm.'

== Status ==
The Farm Animal Convention and its Protocol of Amendment form part of the core of European legislation concerning animal welfare, which also includes the European Convention for the Protection of Animals for Slaughter (1979), the European Convention for the Protection of Animals during International Transport (revised 2003), the European Convention for the Protection of Vertebrate Animals Used for Experimental and Other Scientific Purposes (1986, with its 1998 Protocol of Amendment; see also Directive 2010/63/EU), and the European Convention for the Protection of Pet Animals (1987).

As of May 2021, the European Union (successor of the European Economic Community) and 33 states have ratified or acceded to it, and one state (Estonia) has only signed it. As of May 2021, the Protocol of Amendment has not yet entered into force, as its Article 6 requires all then-Parties to the convention (14 states plus the EU) to also become Parties to the Protocol, which only the Netherlands had yet done.

== See also ==
- Animal rights by country or territory
- List of international animal welfare conventions
