= European Convention for the Protection of Animals for Slaughter =

1979 Council of Europe animal welfare treaty

Slaughter Convention
European Convention for the Protection of Animals for Slaughter
- Signed: 10 May 1979
- Location: Strasbourg, France
- Effective: 11 June 1982
- Condition: 4 ratifications by Council of Europe member states
- Signatories: 30 states
- Ratifiers: 26 states
- Depositary: Secretary General of the Council of Europe
- Citations: CETS No. 102
- Languages: English and French

European Convention for the Protection of Animals for Slaughter: Signed and ratified / Acceded or succeeded; Only signed / Not signed (CoE member states); Not signed (non-CoE member states)

The European Convention for the Protection of Animals for Slaughter, also known as the Slaughter Convention, is an animal welfare treaty of the Council of Europe, adopted on 10 May 1979 in Strasbourg, and effective since 11 June 1982. It establishes ethical standards pertaining to animal slaughter, such as stunning.

== Development ==
Due to increased public awareness and debate about animal welfare in the 1960s, the Council of Europe became more concerned with the topic, and adopted a convention of minimum requirements for animal transport in 1968. Next, it adopted the European Convention for the Protection of Animals kept for Farming Purposes (or Farm Animal Convention) in 1976. The European Convention for the Protection of Animals for Slaughter (or simply Slaughter Convention) followed in 1979, and was revised in 1991. All these conventions were based on animal welfare recommendations resulting from the latest scientific research in applied ethology. The Farm Animal Convention worked as an overarching, open framework law that could be further elaborated later, while the transport and slaughter conventions were much more detailed, 'closed' and finalised in character.

== Contents ==
The stated purpose of the Slaughter Convention is 'to help harmonise methods of slaughter in Europe and make them more humane.' The first set of provisions sets standards for the treatment of animals in slaughterhouses:

- Use of suitable equipment for unloading animals;
- No brutalising or ill-treatment of animals, and in particular no striking of sensitive parts of their bodies;
- Lairaging and care for animals which are not slaughtered immediately on arrival;
- Requisite facilities at slaughterhouses.

The second set of provisions regulates the killing process itself, stating that 'slaughter must be effected in such a way as to spare the animals any unnecessary suffering'.

- Stunning animals is necessary before bleeding them to death, in order to reduce their suffering.
- Large animals may only be stunned through concussion with a captive bolt pistol (penetrative or non-penetrative), electronarcosis, or gas narcosis (see also Stunning#Modern methods). Pole-axes, hammers or puntillas are prohibited.
- Large animals may not be suspended, and their movements may not be restricted before being stunned.
- The Slaughter Convention generally requires stunning before slaughter, but allows its Parties to permit exemptions for religious slaughter: "Each Contracting Party may authorise derogations from the provisions concerning prior stunning in the following cases: – slaughtering in accordance with religious rituals...." The other exemptions are emergency slaughter, slaughter of poultry, rabbits and other small animals.

== Status ==
The Slaughter Convention forms part of the core of European legislation concerning animal welfare, which also includes the European Convention for the Protection of Animals kept for Farming Purposes (1976, with its 1992 Protocol of Amendment), the European Convention for the Protection of Animals during International Transport (revised in 2003, replaced the 1968 original), the European Convention for the Protection of Vertebrate Animals Used for Experimental and Other Scientific Purposes (1986, with its 1998 Protocol of Amendment; see also Directive 2010/63/EU), and the European Convention for the Protection of Pet Animals (1987).

As of May 2021, 26 states have ratified or succeeded/acceded to the Slaughter Convention, and four states have only signed it; neither the European Union nor the other states have yet done so.

== See also ==
- Animal rights by country or territory
- List of international animal welfare conventions
