= Polled Holsteins =

Breed of cattle

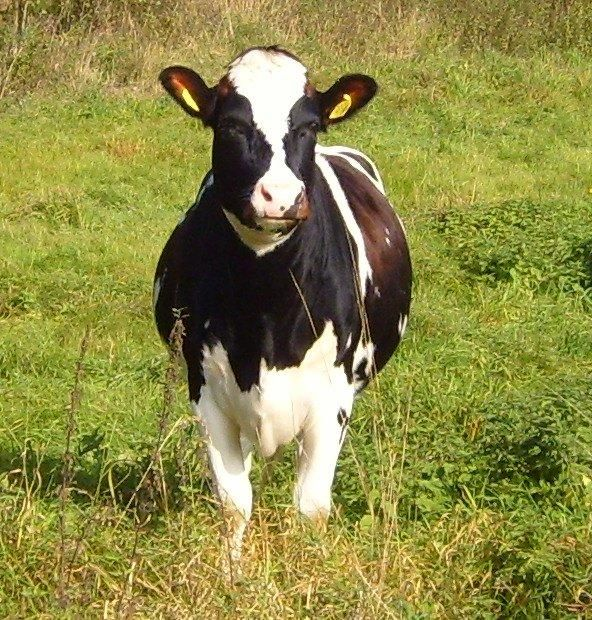

Polled Holsteins are cattle born without horns but only occur in a small portion of Holstein cattle. The Holstein breed can go through selective breeding to produce polled calves. Polled is a natural trait for Holsteins but have not been bred for specifically. That is why a very small percentage of Holsteins are naturally polled. Bulls and cows can both carry the polled trait and pass it on to the progeny. Previous testing for polledness were not completely accurate because it was not looking for the gene directly until later discovered. Polled, also known as 'hornless' can result in the growth of scurs which are small loose horn growths that do not develop.

== Origins ==
One of the first polled Holstein was a bull named 'Lophelias Prince' born in April, 1889. He was found in Massachusetts, US. This particular bull was the first recorded but there had been reports of polled Holsteins previous to the records. Not fully aware of this trait, polled Holsteins were often classed differently than horned Holsteins. After being recognized, polled Holsteins became more popular in European countries then in America. Most of polled Holsteins living today originated from Elevation Sophia EX93 from Pennsylvania, US born in 1974.

== Genetics ==
In Holsteins the polled trait is a dominant allele over the horned trait. Thirteen single nucleotide polymorphisms (SNP) are connected to the polled trait in Holsteins. SNPs went through polymerase chain reactions and digestion to determine that SNP AC000158 is highly correlated with polled Holsteins. If a Holstein is horned it has two copies of the recessive gene which can only be achieved when working with horned parents both carrying the recessive gene. A test cost $80 to check for polledness in a Holstein and can be sent to the Holstein Canada laboratory, or $25 if sent to the Veterinary Genetics Laboratory in California. Holsteins only carrying one copy of the dominant allele and one copy of the recessive allele will still be a carrier of polledness to pass on to the progeny and will express polledness themselves. Any homozygous dominant bull carrying two copies of the polled allele will have polled progeny.

== Reasons for polling ==
Polled Holsteins are becoming more popular and frequently seen. Farmers understand the polled trait more and often benefit from having polled Holsteins in their herd. Horned Holsteins require dehorning at a few months of age to prevent growth of horns which can pose a threat to farmers and cattle handlers. Dehorning costs about $2 per calf. Holsteins with horns can also be more aggressive to fellow cows and cause severe injury to other cows within proximity. Dehorning Holstein calves costs money so having polled cows will save money. Another reason farmers prefer polled Holsteins is for the consumers. Consumers view dehorning as a painful process to calves and often animal welfare issues may arise or public intervention. Having polled Holsteins removes stress of consumers which ultimately benefits farmers.

== Development of polled strains ==
Polled Holsteins were not fully recognized in the 1800s and were often placed in different categories then horned Holsteins. When record keeping began, polled Holsteins became more aware of and the understanding of the polled trait grew. The first polled Holstein sires used for artificial insemination (AI) started in the early to mid 1900s. After polledness was understood, farmers bred to these polled sires. Burket Falls Holsteins bred and got Burket Falls Elevation Sophia, a polled black & white Holstein. This particular cow has more than eight generations of polled progeny that has been spread through numerous farms. She herself had two daughters, Magnetic Susette, and Ca-lil Silver-ET and a bull Dispacher-ET. Both daughters produced calves and the son sired 400 calves. Having this specific polled Holstein with a large number of progeny greatly increased the amount of polled Holsteins present in the dairy industry and AI industry today. 38 polled bulls born between 1995 and 2004 were found in the artificial insemination breeding database in 2009. These bulls have polled progeny so the number of polled calves continues to increase.

== Geography ==
Polled Holsteins are not very common today but are expected to increase rapidly. In the USA polled registered female Holsteins increased by a factor of 10 and in 20 years is expected to have 50% of heifer calves being born polled. Polled Holsteins had been seen more regularly in countries such as Germany, Egypt and Great Britain before accumulating in the Americas.

== See also ==
- Polled livestock
- Holstein Friesian cattle
- Dairy
- Cattle
- Docking
- List of cattle breeds
