= Animal welfare and rights in Ethiopia =

Treatment of and laws concerning non-human animals in Ethiopia

Animal welfare and rights in Ethiopia is about the treatment of and laws concerning non-human animals in Ethiopia. Ethiopia has highly limited animal welfare regulations by international standards, and appears to have little animal activism.

== Legislation ==
An article in Ethiopia's 2005 Criminal Code Proclamation prohibits only public cruelty towards animals. There is no legislation specifically addressing animal welfare.

Ethiopia received an F out of possible grades A, B, C, D, E, F, G on World Animal Protection's Animal Protection Index.

== Animals used for food ==
As of 2008, Ethiopia had Africa's largest livestock population, and was the continent's top livestock producer and exporter. In 2008 Ethiopia had 49 million cattle, almost 50 million sheep and goats, and 35 million chickens. According to a 2010 report, most domestic animals are raised by small-scale farmers, but there are intensive animal farming operations in several cities. However, there is movement towards the intensification of animal agriculture, especially in the poultry sector.

In 2015 Ethiopia released its five-year Livestock Master Plan (LMP), which is designed to promote economic growth by enhancing livestock production. The government of Ethiopia will invest in enhancing veterinary care, improving feed and food quality and safety, promoting exports, and stimulating an investment-friendly environment. The LMP's targets for the end of 2020 include an increase in milk production of over 90% (up to nearly 6 million liters); an increase in annual per capita milk consumption to 0.6 liters; red meat production up more than 50% to nearly 2 million metric tons; egg production up almost 830%, to 32 billion per year; an increase of 467% in chicken meat production, up to 102,000 metric tons; and an increase in per capita chicken consumption from less than 2 kg to over 4 kg.

A 2013 study on livestock transportation in Ethiopia found that animals are often handled abusively, rates of injury and death ranged from 14 to 19%, and animal welfare at market is poor. There are no regulations on the treatment of farm animals other than the Criminal Code's prohibitions on public cruelty. De-beaking, de-toeing, tail-docking, tooth pulling, castration, and dehorning of livestock without anaesthetic are legal, as is confinement in gestation crates and battery cages.

== Work animals ==
According to The Donkey Sanctuary Ethiopia, there are 12.4 million oxen, 5.7 million donkeys, 2.4 million camels, 2 million horses, and 0.3 million mules in Ethiopia. These work animals play a major in role in the Ethiopian economy. There are no regulations on the treatment of work animals apart from the Criminal Code's prohibitions on public cruelty.

== Stray animals ==
As of 2013 Ethiopia had a dog population of approximately 300,000, and about 200,000 of these are strays. Officials cull thousands of stray dogs by feeding them poisoned meat or leaving them to die in pits. Vaccinating and neutering animals is rare.

== Animal activism ==
The Ethiopian Vegan Association was founded in 2010 by American-based medical doctor Anteneh Roba and Ethiopian Mesfin Hailemariam. According to Hailemariam, the association consists of a handful of activists who do vegan outreach and education.

Dr. Roba also established the International Fund for Africa, which is working with local partners to set up veterinary training programs for small animal care and educating the public about the humane treatment of draught animals.

== See also ==
- Timeline of animal welfare and rights
- Animal rights movement
- Animal consciousness
- Agriculture in Ethiopia
