= Countries banning non-human ape experimentation =

This is a list of countries banning non-human ape experimentation. The term non-human ape here refers to all members of the superfamily Hominoidea, excluding Homo sapiens. Banning in this case refers to the enactment of formal decrees prohibiting experimentation on non-human apes, though often with exceptions for extreme scenarios. (Note: E.g. EU Directive 2010/63/EU allows for experimentation on great apes only for "the preservation of those species and where action in relation to a life-threatening, debilitating condition endangering human beings is warranted, and no other species or alternative method would suffice in order to achieve the aims of the procedure.")

Experimentation on great apes—a smaller family within the ape superfamily—is currently banned in the European Union, the United Kingdom, and New Zealand (29 countries total). These countries have ruled that chimpanzees, bonobos, gorillas and orangutans are so cognitively similar to humans that using them as test subjects is unethical. Austria is the only country in the world to have completely banned experiments on all apes, including both the great apes and the lesser apes, commonly known as gibbons.

== Table of countries banning all non-human ape experimentation ==
Country	Date	Law	Statute	Refs
Austria	2012	Animal Experiments Act 2012 (Note: Original German: "Tierversuchsgesetz 2012")	An animal experiment is in any case unlawful if the animal experiment is on any species and subspecies of the chimpanzees (Pan troglodytes), bonobos (Pan paniscus) and gorillas (Gorilla gorilla spp), and on any species and subspecies of the families orangutans (Pongo (Note: Pongidae is an obsolete taxon, encompassing all the mentioned apes. Probably Pongo was meant.)) and gibbons (Hylobatidae). (Note: Original German: "Ein Tierversuch ist jedenfalls unzulässig, wenn der Tierversuch an allen Arten und Unterarten der Schimpansen (Pan troglodytes), Bonobos (Pan paniscus) und Gorillas (Gorilla gorilla spp), sowie an allen Arten und Unterarten der Familien Orang Utans (Pongidae) und Gibbons (Hylobatidae)")	

== Table of countries banning non-human great ape experimentation ==
Country	Year	Title	Statute	Refs
European Union Member States	2013	EU Directive 2010/63/EU	The use of great apes, as the closest species to human beings with the most advanced social and behavioural skills, should be permitted only for the purposes of research aimed at the preservation of those species and where action in relation to a life-threatening, debilitating condition endangering human beings is warranted, and no other species or alternative method would suffice in order to achieve the aims of the procedure. The Member State claiming such a need should provide information necessary for the commission to take a decision.	
New Zealand	1999	Animal Welfare Act 1999	No person may carry out any research, testing, or teaching involving the use of a non-human hominid unless such use has first been approved by the Director-General and the research, testing, or teaching is carried out in accordance with any conditions imposed by the Director-General. The Director-General must not give approval unless he or she is satisfied that the use of the non-human hominid in the research, testing, or teaching is in the best interests of the non-human hominid; or that the use of the non-human hominid in the research, testing, or teaching is in the interests of the species to which the non-human hominid belongs and that the benefits to be derived from the use of the non-human hominid in the research, testing, or teaching are not outweighed by the likely harm to the non-human hominid.	

== See also ==
- Animal rights by country or territory
- Great ape personhood
- Great Ape Trust
- Declaration on Great Apes
- Great Ape Project
- List of animal rights advocates
- Project R&R: Release and Restitution for Chimpanzees in US Laboratories
- Animal liberation movement
