= Animal welfare and rights in Indonesia =

Treatment of and laws concerning non-human animals in Indonesia

Animal welfare and rights in Indonesia regards the treatment of and laws concerning non-human animals in Indonesia. Indonesia has limited animal welfare regulations by international standards.

== Legislation ==
Indonesia's Criminal Code prohibits intentionally causing an animal unnecessary harm. Law 18 of 2009 also addresses animal welfare, requiring that measures are taken in the interest of animal welfare in relation to capture, husbandry, slaughter, and transport. The provisions apply to vertebrates and some invertebrates capable of feeling pain. This law refers to animals as industrial products, and appears to be focused on the health and productivity of animals as property rather than on the prevention of animal cruelty.

The anti-cruelty provisions of the Criminal Code apply to farm animals. Livestock transportation and slaughter are to be conducted so that animals are free from fear, pressure, and torture. Law 18 of 2009 also applies to farm animals, providing that animals' needs for feed and health be met, and that killing be done according to certain health, safety, and welfare guidelines. Secondary legislation passed in 2012 requires that animal suffering be reduced at slaughter, that animals be afforded the Five Freedoms, and that those involved in animal use "have competence in the field of animal welfare".

The duty of care and anti-cruelty provisions also apply to animals used in research, but there is no legislation specifically regulating animal testing.

In 2014, Indonesia's animal protection regulations received a D out of possible grades A, B, C, D, E, F, G on World Animal Protection's Animal Protection Index.

== Animals used for food ==
=== Animal agriculture ===
Indonesia is a major producer of chicken meat, with the third-largest chicken flock in the world (behind China and the United States) at 1.79 billion chickens in 2013. Poultry meat accounts for about 87% of total Indonesian meat consumption, due to its greater affordability and dietary restrictions on pig meat (88% of Indonesians are Muslim). And demand for chicken meat is growing rapidly; in 2014 it was projected to double within 5 years.

Only 2% of Indonesia's broiler farms are fully closed houses equipped with automated food and water systems and climate control. Typically these farms house 100,000-400,000 chickens. 95% of birds are farmed in small open houses containing 3,000-20,000, which have high mortality rates (up to 8%) due to disease and high temperatures. The majority of chicken slaughter takes place in backyard facilities. Only 24% are slaughtered in abattoirs, and only 34 abattoirs hold a veterinary certificate which allows them to sell to supermarkets, fast food restaurants, and hotels.

In 2015 the domestic supply of cattle was roughly 2.44 million; the meat of approximately 1.39 million more cattle was imported. The Indonesian government has pushed to increase the domestic supply of beef; in 2014 it set a target for beef self-sufficiency within five years. Beef demand is expected to grow 5.6% over the next nine years.

Indonesia's main fishery export is shrimp, and the country is one of the largest shrimp exporters. Its fish and shrimp export value grew by 9.2% between 2010 and 2014, and in 2013 it was projected that Indonesia's shrimp cultivation will expand by 10.7% between 2012 and 2015.

De-beaking, de-toeing, tail-docking, tooth pulling, castration, and dehorning of livestock without anaesthetic are legal, as is confinement in gestation crates and battery cages.

=== Pet meat trade ===
According to animal welfare groups, hundreds of thousands of stray and pet dogs are inhumanely slaughtered each year to supply Indonesia's dog meat trade. Other animals sold in the "pet meat" trade include cats, rabbits, bats, rats, pigs, and snakes. Footage of pet meat markets shows dogs being clubbed to death or burned alive with blow torches. Local animal rights groups on Java Island Animal Friends Jogja (AFJ) and Jakarta Animal Aid Network (JAAN) have campaigned for the last few years to end the dog meat trade in Indonesia.

== Animals used for research ==
Testing cosmetics on animals is legal in Indonesia. During Jakarta Fashion week in 2013, Cruelty Free International and The Body Shop, along with hundreds of supporters, called on the Association of Southeast Asian Nations (ASEAN) to ban testing cosmetics on animals (ASEAN is responsible for regulating animal cosmetics testing in Indonesia and nine other Southeast Asian countries). ASEAN agreed to discuss the ban, but as of June 2016 there have been no major developments.

== Stray animals ==
There are an estimated 500,000 stray dogs on the Indonesian island of Bali. Dogs are routinely culled, and the government advises people to kill dogs rather than place them in a shelter. The most common method of killing strays is strychnine poisoning, which has been condemned by animal welfare advocates for being severely painful.

== Animal activism ==
Indonesia's animal welfare organizations include the Bali Street Dog Foundation, which works to address the stray dog problem in Bali by providing sterilization, treating street dogs for disease, training veterinarians, and teaching "Kindness Clubs" in grade schools; Jakarta Animal Aid Network, which engages in pet adoption, sterilization, rescue, and a "Dogs Are Not Food" campaign; and the Bali Animal Welfare Association, whose activities include emergency rescue of animals, veterinary care, rehabilitation and adoption, spaying and neutering, and animal welfare advocacy. Animal rights activism or opposition to animal agriculture appears rare or nonexistent.

In 2014, Indonesia's first Workshop to Strengthen Animal Welfare Laws was held in Jakarta. Participants included animal welfare groups, policymakers, academics, clerics, vets, and students, who gave presentations of the state of animal welfare law in Indonesia and how it can be improved.

== See also ==
- Animal rights movement
- Timeline of animal welfare and rights
