= Animal welfare and rights in Azerbaijan =

Treatment of and laws concerning non-human animals in Azerbaijan

Azerbaijan ranks fairly poorly in terms of its commitment to the protection of animal welfare and freedom from suffering. It is ranked 36th out of 50 countries on the Voiceless Animal Cruelty Index. According to the Animal Protection Index, it has not pledged support for the Universal Declaration on Animal Welfare, there is no policy or legislation in the country preventing animal suffering by deliberate acts or negligence, and there are no animal protection laws in reference to animals used in farming. The country does have legislation on the conservation of wild animals, which also applies to animals kept in confinement. It implies a duty of care, in limited situations, but its effectiveness is hard to assess.

== Red Book of Azerbaijan ==
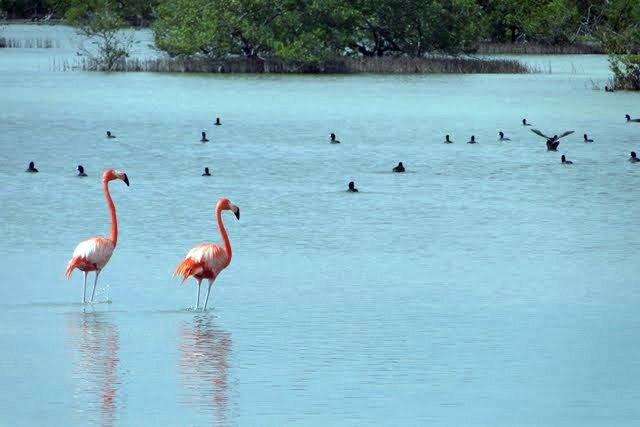
Red Flamingos

Lists of rare and endangered species of wild animals in Azerbaijan are drawn up in the Red Book. The Red Book is an official state document. The first edition of the document was published in 1989, and the expectation is to republish the Book every 10 years. The Document includes information on measures to protect rare and endangered species of animals, and spread of them throughout the country, including the Caspian Sea (lake) sector belonging to Azerbaijan. The Book differentiates between rare and endangered species. The last version of Red Book published in 2013 contains information about rare and endangered 14 mammal species, 36 bird species, 5 species of fish, 13 amphibians, and reptile species, 40 insect species.

== Organizations ==
=== Azerbaijan Animal Rescue Center ===
AARC (Azerbaijan Animal Rescue and Veterinary Care Center), the first animal protection center in Azerbaijan, has been founded by Ms. Hedieh Roshanzamir. The primary goal of AARC is to minimize street animals. The organization neutered more than 4000 animals free of charge until the end of September 2017. For spaying of animals and other medical purposes, AARC employs a specialized team of veterinary doctors and surgeons. The organization promotes the culture of animal love and adoption and prevents cruel and inhumane treatment against animals. AARC believes that animals need the care and attention of people as well as home, food, water, and medical care.

=== Azerbaijan Society for the Protection of Animals ===
Azerbaijan Society for the Protection of Animals (ASPA) was registered by the Ministry of Justice of Azerbaijan on 20 October 1992. In November 2001, the World Society for the Protection of Animals, and on 6 February 2002, the Royal Society for the Prevention of Cruelty to Animals granted a membership to the ASPA.

=== Kennel Union of the Republic of Azerbaijan ===
Kennel Union of the Republic of Azerbaijan (KURA) was established by young dog specialists, cynologists, dog trainers, doctors and veterinarians, biologists, breeders, and just ordinary dog fanciers. Since March 2006, KURA is a contract partner of International Cynologycal Federation.

== Ratified Conventions ==
Azerbaijan signed the European Convention for the Protection of Pet Animals on 22 October 2003, and ratified it on 19 October 2007. Since 1 May 2008, the Convention is in force in Azerbaijan. The Convention aims to better health and well-being of pet animals, to promote the protection of them, and to raise awareness about the attitudes of them. The Convention stresses close relationship between pet animals and humans, and social value of pet animals.

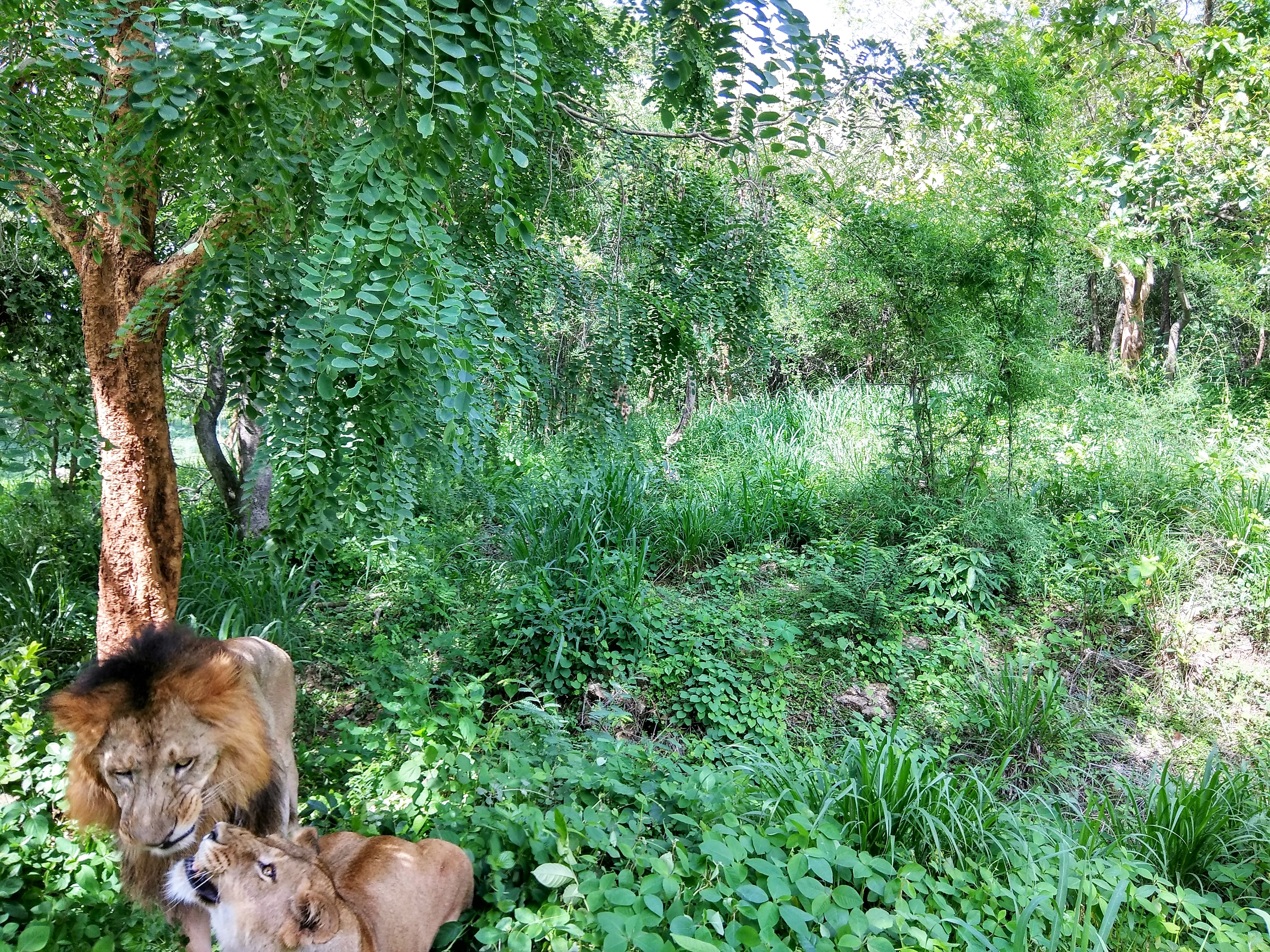
Wildlife Natural Heritage

Azerbaijan ratified the Convention on the Conservation of European Wildlife and Natural Habitats on 28 March 2000, and since 1 July 2000, the Convention is in force in Azerbaijan. The Parties to the Convention including Azerbaijan have to ensure and encourage the protection of wild flora and fauna species, in particular, endangered and vulnerable species. Member states of the Convention bare responsibility for dissemination of information concerning the conservation of wild flora and fauna among people. Additionally, the Convention is not recommendatory, but compulsory for the parties, and they must develop policies regarding protection of wildlife.

The Convention concerning the Protection of the World Cultural and Natural Heritage was adopted in Paris on 16 November 1972. Azerbaijan ratified the Convention on 16 December 1993. Parties to the Convention including Azerbaijan recognized the habitat of threatened species of animals as “world natural heritage.”

== National legislation ==
=== The Code of the Azerbaijan Republic on administrative violations ===
Taking animals from their natural habitat without permission defined by Law of the Azerbaijan Republic on Wildlife is prohibited. This activity entails imposition on natural persons of penalty in amount of two hundred to five hundred manats, official persons – two thousand to two thousand and five hundred manats, and legal persons- five thousand to seven thousand and five hundred manats.

Cruel treatment of animals causing their death, or severe injury is prohibited by the Code. People who violate this norm are punished with five hundred manats.

The Code includes an article to protect endangered species of animals. Every person has to comply with the legislative requirements concerning the protection of specially protected sorts of animals defined in the Red Book of Azerbaijan.

== See also ==
- Labour rights in Azerbaijan
- Animal rights in Islam
