= Animal welfare and rights in Sweden =

Treatment of and laws concerning non-human animals in Sweden

Animal welfare and rights in Sweden is about the treatment of and laws concerning non-human animals in Sweden.

== Regulations ==
Sweden's Penal Code makes an offence of cruelty to animals, either intentional or due to gross carelessness. These protections apply to all animals capable of suffering.

In addition to the Penal Code, Sweden's Animal Welfare Act 1988 provides that animals be treated well and protected from unnecessary suffering and disease. It includes specific requirements including provision of sufficient food, water, care, and space; placing animals in an environment that promotes their health and permits natural behavior; using transportation suitable to provide shelter and protection; and not subjecting animals to surgical procedures or giving injections except where necessary for veterinary medical reasons. At slaughter, animals are required to be spared unnecessary discomfort and suffering and that livestock be stunned before being bled. This exceeds the slaughter requirements of the European Union, which allows member states to grant exemptions for religious slaughter; thus no kosher slaughter can take place in Sweden.

The Animal Welfare Ordinance 1988 contains further provisions related to livestock. Livestock buildings cannot be erected or altered without the approval of an animal welfare and animal health authority. The Ordinance grants powers for the Board of Agriculture to make further regulations on specific species. Regulations made under this provision include rules on fish farming and transport.

In 2014 and again in 2020, Sweden received a B out of possible grades A, B, C, D, E, F, G on World Animal Protection's Animal Protection Index.

== Animals used for food ==
=== Animal agriculture ===
In 2010 Sweden had approximately 80 million broilers, 500,000 beef cattle, 350,000 dairy cows, 200,000 sows, 2.5 million pigs, and 6 million layer hens.

An investigation by the Swedish animal activist organization Animal Rights Alliance of one hundred Swedish pig farms found that 94% of farms lacked straw (rooting in straw is a natural behavior for pigs), 20% of farms used gestation crates (which are illegal in Sweden), dead animals were found at 40% of farms, tail biting (which occurs when pigs lack enough space and straw for stimulation) was found at 50%, and 84% had severely ill or wounded pigs.

=== Animal product consumption ===
Between the 1990s and 2014, Swedish meat consumption grew by 40% but in 2014 was slightly below the European Union average. However, Swedish beef consumption per capita is the third-highest in Europe, behind Denmark and France.

In 2007, Sweden had the second-highest milk consumption in the world, behind Finland.

=== Veganism ===
In a 2014 survey of 1000 Swedes commissioned by Animal Rights Sweden, ten percent of respondents identified as either vegan or vegetarian. This was a four-percent increase from a survey five years earlier.

== Animals used in research ==
In 2012, 982,842 animals were used in research in Sweden. If fish used in sample-based fishery surveys are included, 5,535,458 animals were used.

== Animals used for fur ==
An undercover investigation of 15 Swedish mink farms by activist group Animal Rights Alliance found behavior indicative of high stress and frustration on 13 of 15 farms; infected, unconscious, convulsive, maimed, and dead animals; cages with large amounts of feces piled up on 67% of farms; illegal handling of carcasses on 73% of farms; and cannibalism on half of farms.

In a 2015 opinion poll, 78% of the 1000 Swedish respondents (and 85% under age 30) said "No" to "Do you think it should be allowed to breed minks in cages for fur production?".

== Animal activism ==
The leading Swedish animal rights organization, Djurens Rätt (Animal Rights Sweden), was founded in 1882 under the name Nordiska Samfundet (Nordic Association) with the goal of opposing painful animal testing. Its current membership is about 40,000 (out of 10 million Swedes).

Another Swedish animal activist organization is Djurrättsalliansen (Animal Rights Alliance) The Animal Rights Alliance is a grassroots group formed in 2005 whose activities include undercover investigations of animal testing operations and farms, demonstrations, and vegan outreach.

== See also ==
- Timeline of animal welfare and rights
- Animal rights movement
- Animal consciousness
- Animal cruelty
- Timeline of animal welfare and rights in Europe
