= List of international animal welfare conventions =

This is a list of international conventions relating to the protection of animals.

== General conventions ==
- Convention on Biological Diversity (CBD, Biodiversity Convention, Rio Convention)
- World Cultural and Natural Heritage Convention (UNESCO)
- Ramsar Convention on Wetlands of International Importance Especially as Waterfowl Habitat (Ramsar Convention, Convention on Wetlands)
- Convention on the Conservation of Migratory Species of Wild Animals (Convention on Migratory Species (CMS), Bonn Convention)
- Convention on International Trade in Endangered Species of Wild Fauna and Flora (CITES, Washington Convention)

== Specialised conventions ==
- International Convention on the Protection of Birds (followed the 1902 International Convention for the Protection of Birds that are Useful for Agriculture)
- Migratory Bird Treaty (Migratory Birds Convention – Canada and United States)
- Convention for the Conservation of Antarctic Marine Living Resources (CCAMLR, Canberra Convention)
- African Convention on the Conservation of Nature and Natural Resources (Algiers Convention)
- Convention on the Conservation of the Vicuña (1969 La Paz Convention, 1979 Lima Convention)
- International Convention for the Regulation of Whaling (ICRW, replaces the 1931 Geneva Convention for Regulation of Whaling and the 1937 International Agreement for the Regulation of Whaling)
  - International Whaling Commission 1982 moratorium on whaling, 2018 Florianópolis Declaration
- International Agreement on the Preservation of Polar Bears and their Habitat (Agreement on the Conservation of Polar Bears, Oslo Agreement)
- Agreement on the Conservation of Albatrosses and Petrels (ACAP, Hobart Agreement)

== Council of Europe ==
- Berne Convention on the Conservation of European Wildlife and Natural Habitats (Bern/Berne Convention; also acceded by several non-CoE member states)
- European Convention for the Protection of Animals during International Transport (original 1968 animal transport convention & revised 2003 animal transport convention)
- European Convention for the Protection of Pet Animals
- European Convention for the Protection of Animals for Slaughter (Slaughter Convention)
- European Convention for the Protection of Animals kept for Farming Purposes (Farm Animal Convention)
- European Convention for the Protection of Vertebrate Animals Used for Experimental and Other Scientific Purposes

== See also ==
- Animal rights
  - Animal rights by country or territory
- Animal welfare
- International law
- International human rights instruments
- List of animal rights advocates
- List of international environmental agreements
- Timeline of animal welfare and rights
