= Animal welfare and rights in Switzerland =

Treatment of and laws concerning non-human animals in Switzerland

Animal welfare and rights in Switzerland is about the treatment of and laws concerning non-human animals in Switzerland. Switzerland has high levels of animal welfare protection by international standards.

== Legislation ==
The Animal Welfare Act (AniWA) (Note: German: Tierschutzgesetz, TSchG; French: Loi fédérale sur la protection des animaux, LPA; Italian: Legge federale sulla protezione degli animali, LPAn) of 2005 prohibits inflicting pain, suffering, or harm on an animal, inducing anxiety in an animal, or otherwise disregarding its dignity without justification. Mishandling, neglect, or unnecessary overwork is also prohibited. This legislation applies to all vertebrates as well as to invertebrates designated by the Federal Council.

The Animal Welfare Act 2005 and the Animal Welfare Ordinance 2008 contain specific regulations on farmed animal welfare. The Act provides that animal handlers must account for their needs as best as possible and ensure their well-being as far as the circumstances of the intended purpose permit. In regard to livestock transportation, cattle, pigs, goats, sheep, horses, and poultry travelling to slaughter must travel by rail or air. The Ordinance sets out specific requirements for transporting livestock. Mammals are required to be stunned before slaughter, including slaughter for religious purposes (though halal and kosher meat from non-stunned animals is permitted to be imported and sold). Battery cages, gestation crates, debeaking, and piglet castration are banned.

In 2014, Switzerland received a grade A out of possible grades A, B, C, D, E, F or G on World Animal Protection's Animal Protection Index.

== History ==
=== Animal law ===
Concerns over animal welfare in Switzerland emerged in the mid-eighteenth century. Public vivisection was met with scattered disapproval when first performed in Swiss universities in the 1830s, but did not see organized opposition. In 1842, the Swiss canton of Schaffhausen enacted Switzerland's first law against animal cruelty, and in 1844, the first Swiss animal protection society–Tierschutzverein–was founded in Bern. By 1885, all Swiss cantons had legal regulations against animal cruelty, though many of these laws prohibited only public cruelty. In 1893, slaughtering without anesthesia was banned by referendum.

In 1978, the Animal Welfare Act was approved by Swiss voters with 80% of the popular vote, and in 1992, Switzerland became the first country to constitutionally recognize animals, with a constitutional provision warranting the protection of "the dignity of the creature".

In 2010, Swiss voters rejected a referendum which would appoint lawyers on the behalf of animals, with only 29.5% voting in favor of the measure.

=== Animal agriculture ===
Intensive animal farming began in Switzerland in the early to mid-twentieth century. The first major battery egg farm was constructed in 1935. In 1974, 160,000 Swiss signed a petition calling for a ban on factory farming, but it failed.

== Animal issues ==
=== Animals used for food ===
==== Animal agriculture ====
In 2015, Switzerland had the following numbers of livestock:

- 1.56 million cattle
- 60,000 horses
- 410,000 sheep
- 90,000 goats
- 1.48 million pigs
- 10 million poultry

The number of cows has been roughly stable since 2000. The number of pigs has decreased since 2006, while the number of poultry has increased continually.

The number of animal welfare animal convictions for mistreatment of farmed animals has risen significantly since the revised Animal Welfare Act came into force in September 2008, from slightly over 200 convictions in 2008 to approximately 500 in 2013.

==== Veganism ====
In 2005, the Swiss Nutrition Report found that 2.5% of respondents self-identified as vegetarian, while in 2006 a survey commissioned by the meat lobby organization Proviande found that 5% of respondents self-identified as vegetarian. Estimates of the number of vegans are not readily available.

=== Animals used in research ===
In 2016, the Swiss government decided to ban the sale of cosmetics products containing ingredients newly tested on animals.

In 2016, 606,505 animals were reported to have been used in research in Switzerland, not including invertebrates except cephalopods and lobsters. 95% of the animals reported being used were mice, rats, birds, and fish. 42% of experiments were categorized below threshold severity, 35% were mild, 21% were moderate and 2% were classified as severe. Since the early 1980s, there was a steady downward trend in the use of animals in research in Switzerland, which stabilized in recent years.

=== Animal personhood ===
In June 2016, Swiss and German-based anti-speciesist political think-tank Sentience Politics began collecting signatures for a ballot initiative on fundamental rights for primates in Basel, Switzerland. If passed, the measure would amend the cantonal constitution to "right to life and respect for the physical and mental integrity" for non-human primates. If passed, it would significantly curtail medical experimentation on primates and primate confinement practices in Basel.

== Animal activism ==
Swiss Animal Protection (SAP), founded in 1861, is the largest and oldest animal protection organization in Switzerland. SAP has special units for pets, wild animals, farmed animals, animals in experiments, and veterinary and legal advisory services. Their activities include campaigns to "improve and enlarge animal friendly husbandry of farm animals".

In addition to its campaign for primate rights in Basel, Sentience Politics has ongoing campaigns in Basel, Lucerne, and Zürich to enact policies which would commit cantonal or municipal governments to promoting plant-based diets, including the offering of vegetarian and vegan options in public cafeterias.

== See also ==
- Agriculture in Switzerland
- Animal consciousness
- Timeline of animal welfare and rights
- Timeline of animal welfare and rights in Europe
