= Animal welfare and rights in Iran =

Treatment of and laws concerning non-human animals in Iran

Animal welfare and rights in Iran is about the laws concerning and treatment of non-human animals in Iran. Iran has no legislation protecting animals from cruelty.

Iranian regime established national dog walking ban since June 2025.

== Legislation ==
Iran does not have basic anti-cruelty legislation, and there does not appear to be any effort underway to develop anti-cruelty regulations. Iran received a G out of possible grades A, B, C, D, E, F, G on World Animal Protection's Animal Protection Index.

In 2016, Iran stopped issuing permits for wild animal circuses.

== Animals used for food ==
The poultry industry is Iran's second-largest industry next to oil. In 2012, Iran's poultry industry produced approximately 2 billion birds. Poultry production has grown significantly over the past few decades, with output rising from 195,000 tons in 1978 to 2.1 million tons in 2012.

There are no regulations on the welfare of farm animals in Iran. Stunning at slaughter is not required. De-beaking, de-toeing, tail-docking, tooth pulling, castration, and dehorning of livestock without anaesthetic are legal, as is confinement in gestation crates, veal crates, and battery cages.

== Animal activism ==
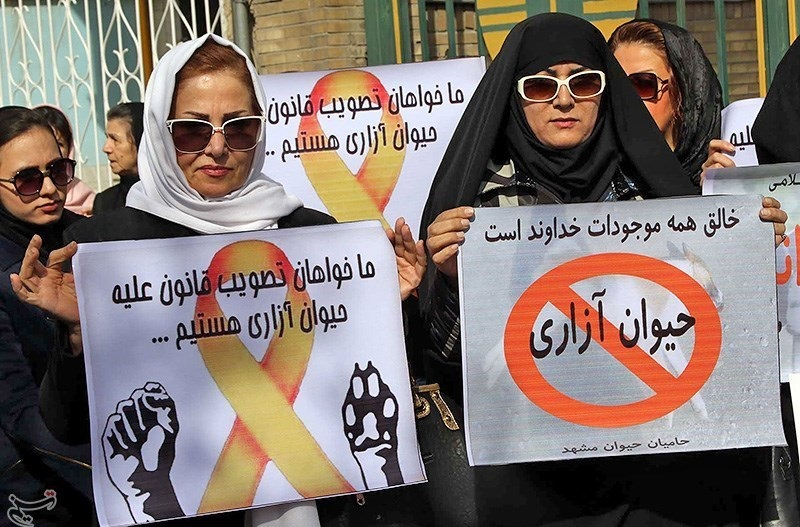
Protestors against animal abuse in Mashhad, Iran

The Iranian Anti-Vivisection Association (IAVA) is Iran's first anti-vivisection group. The IAVA campaigns for the use of alternatives to animal testing. In 2012 they were given the Brown Bear Award by Iran Animal Rights Watch for being Iran's most active animal rights group.

In 2015, videos of men killing dogs with injections of what appears to be acid in the Iranian city of Shiraz sparked protests against animal cruelty towards dogs. Activists demanded that killings be stopped and that dogs be sheltered and vaccinated instead. Activists in Tabriz persuaded local officials to stop the killing and permit activists to place dogs in a shelter.

In 2014, Animal Rights Watch and Animal Defenders International launched the "No to Circus!" campaign. This resulted in the Iranian Department of Environment's 2016 ban on using wildlife in circuses.
