= Animal welfare and rights in Argentina =

Treatment of and laws concerning non-human animals in Argentina

Animal rights are distinguishable from animal welfare. In general, the term "animal rights" is the belief that humans do not have a right to use animals for their own purposes. "Animal welfare", on the other hand, is the belief that humans do have a right to use animals as long as the animals are treated humanely. Globally, animals have been gaining importance over the years. Particularly, in Argentina, people have also fought and continue to fight for their rights. Although many people show disinterest in animals, others fight for their protection and wellbeing. Due to the collaboration of several protectionists, both domestic and wild animals have become of great importance to Argentine society. In addition, both population and governments have put emphasis on their rights, the campaigns against animal abuses, and, essentially, the 14.346 Act (or Sarmiento Act) that has been passed on as regards animal safety in Argentina. Furthermore, there are also different entities that specifically refer to animal rights and animal protection, either by the Argentinian government or by independent organizations; therefore, in Argentina there has been a whole mobilization from around the 1950s aimed at raising awareness among the population about the importance of animals as living beings and how fundamental it is to know about their rights and how to enforce them, since they have suffered a great deal throughout history.

== Domestic and wild animals ==
There is a clear distinction between how to protect domestic animals, and how to protect wild animals. This is because there are important differences regarding their natural habitats and living conditions, especially in the cases of species which are in danger of becoming extinct. From this point, Natasha Daly (2019) states that:

Domesticated animals are animals that have been selectively bred and genetically adapted over generations to live alongside humans. Animal domestication falls into three main groupings: domestication for companionship (dogs and cats), animals farmed for food (sheep, cows, pigs, turkeys, etc.), and working or draft animals (horses, donkeys, camels).

Domestic animals, if properly cared for, can live with human beings without suffering their captivity. It's generally easier to take care of domestic animals since their living conditions are similar to those of humans. For example, the room temperature comfortable for people is often found comfortable for a dog or a cat. Domestic animals live in human houses but also in farms, but under the care and supervision of human beings. As regards wild animals, the Canadian site World Animal Protection states that: “wild animals belong to a group of animals who have never been domesticated. Wild animals live and breed in their natural environment without human interference.” If wild animals are bred in captivity, it is possible for them to suffer a decisive change in the way they behave. The closeness between the animal and a human being will likely alter the former's attitude. In spite of that, they remain wild, for they share behavioural and psychological traits with their wild counterparts. Wild animals can inhabit a vast amount of spaces, such as fields, woods, ponds, wetlands, prairies, park, or human yards. Wild animals make their home in both the city and the country. But they are not under the care of human beings

Argentinian policymakers have resorted to this distinction between domestic and wild animals in order to pass bills, create acts and establish regulations according to the specific needs of such animals.

== Acts and regulations ==
On 25 July 1891, The Senate and the Chamber of Deputies of the Republic of Argentina passed the 2.786 Act, which was a pioneer in fostering animal protection and fair treatment. It was commonly known as the “Sarmiento Act” because the former president of the Argentine Republic, Domingo F. Sarmiento, was the first one who issued decrees concerning animal protection. Besides, the 14.346 Act is also known as the “Sarmiento Act”. On 24 September 1881, the Argentine Animal Protection Association was created and, thanks to its efforts, a decade later, the aforementioned Act was passed. On 5 October 1900, the 3.9595 Act of Animal Health Police was passed and it advocated for the rights of cattle in Argentine territory. In 1954, the 2.786 Act was supplemented by the 14.346 Act, whose issuer was Dr. Antonio J. Benitez. This Act is part of the supplementary laws contained in the Argentine's Criminal Code and it condemns those who treat animals with cruelty. The penalties range from fifteen days to one year in prison. In 1950, the 13.908 Act was passed, which was the first National Hunting and Wildlife Protection Act, but it was repealed by the 22.421 Act, on 5 March 1981. This act dictated more restrictive norms at national level, and it prohibited, limited, and regulated the exportation and internal trade of wild animals. Besides, this act declared wild animals of public interest and it established penalties for those who went against the law. The 22.351 Act (which was modified by the 26.389 Act) is about national parks and its aim is the conservation and protection of native species of plants and animals. It also mentions some species of animals that are considered natural monuments and, as such, they should be completely protected (for example, the Southern Right Whale, the Andean deer and the Yaguareté). In 1998, the 25.052 Act was passed, in which the hunting and capture of the killer whale was prohibited in Argentine territory. The penalties for breaking this law range from one to two million Argentine pesos. Besides, in 2016, the 27.330 Act which prohibits dog races throughout the Argentine territory was passed.

Since the year 2014, there have been many bills that were presented before the National Senate and the Chamber of Deputies aiming at showing more interest in animal rights. These bills showed a clear concern on the part of the legislators when it came to advocating for the welfare of animals. In fact, one of these bills was the 4143 D-20159 bill about Animal's Welfare and Protection presented by the deputy Sanchez, which basically consists in the repealing of the 14.346 Act. The aim of this bill is to proclaim respect towards all animal species, and it puts emphasis on the rights of animals to live a cruelty-free life. An additional aim of the bill is to raise awareness among the population about the care and respect towards animals. Even though this bill is more detailed and comprehensive than its predecessors (since it aims at prohibiting and preventing the suffering, exploitation and abuse of all kinds of animals that live in Argentina), until today, it has not been passed.

In 2014, Argentina received a D out of possible grades A, B, C, D, E, F, G on World Animal Protection's Animal Protection Index.

Some other acts have been created considering the specific conditions and needs of domestic and wild animals. So, besides the general act (Act Nº 14.346), there is another national act which protects Wildlife in particular; 22421 act. This act protects endangered species, it regulates hunting and controls the environment they live in. As for domestic animals, in the city of Buenos Aires, Act No 6173 was passed, which looks for the "Protection and Care of Domestic Animals". Overall, this act punishes the abandonment of domestic animals, inflicting them physical or psychological damage.

== Animal rights activism & Organizations ==
Since the awareness about animal protection has gained momentum, different entities, whether independent or governmental, have created different spaces in which each one has a purpose. Regarding domestic animals, the main objectives of these organizations are to rescue animals from the street, to promote responsible adoption and spay, to provide shelter, among others. As for wild animals, the purposes are to create sanctuaries or natural reserves for those animals that suffer from the exploitation of their natural habitat in order for them to live in the dignified conditions they deserve, depending on the corresponding flora and fauna. As it is known, in Argentina there are different types of climates, in which each species must be apt to live in, that is why the organizations also fight to raise awareness about the care of the environment so that, in this way, they can lower the average number of species in danger of extinction. Some of the most well known organizations in Argentina that are in charge of the protection and welfare of animals are the following:

- Proyecto Carayá: Argentine primate rescue, rehabilitation and conservation center. Proyecto Carayá is the first and only primate center in Argentina. It is an NGO that has been developing for more than 20 years the ex-situ conservation program of the Argentinean species Alouatta Caraya (Caraya monkey) or “howler monkey”. They rescue wild animals that have been victims of illegal trafficking, petting and the destruction of their natural habitats. Many of them have lived very traumatic situations and arrive at the Sanctuary in alarming conditions.
- Pumakawa (natural reserve): Pumawaka is an NGO dedicated to the environmental conservation of native species in numerical detriment or at risk of extinction in the central region of Argentina. In Pumawaka, protectionists develop conservation, education, recreation and research investigations.
- Fundación GARRA: Independent entity funded by María Celeste Ávila, a woman who lost her beloved dog and could never find him again. After that sad episode, she decided, in 2012, together with people who shared her story and understood her pain, to create a shelter for stray and abandoned animals. The GARRA foundation rescues dogs and cats that have been victims of human cruelty and, at the same time, raises awareness about love for these beings.
- Fundación Sin Estribos: This entity aims to stop cruelty against horses, since many of their owners abuse their carrying capacity. On the other hand, the main objective is to put an end to the "jineteada", or horseback riding, since it is the living reflection of the mistreatment of equines. Their slogan is "jineteada is neither culture nor tradition, but mistreatment."
- Asociación Civil Hocicos Felices: Another independent organization whose main goal is to rescue stray cats and dogs and give them a dignified life.
- Fundación Azara: With a human team very committed to the conservation and management of wildlife, this organization has rescued and cared for more than three thousand wild animals, mainly victims of road accidents and illegal trafficking. The Foundation also stands out for its work in the creation and implementation of natural reserves that have added more than one hundred and fifty thousand hectares to conservation. And in the creation, enhancement and administration of regional museums of natural history and archeology, interpretation centers, geoparks, paleontological and archeological sites.
- AnimaNaturalis: On this website, people are taught some of the procedures by which they can report animal abuse in Argentina. This site has a wide variety of resources and plenty of information available regarding animal abuse and how to combat it.

== Animals used for food ==
Between 2003 and 2012, Argentina's poultry production tripled and per capita consumption doubled. In 2012 Argentina was the ninth-largest poultry producer in the world and projected to become the fourth-largest in coming years.

Argentina is projected to have a cattle inventory of 53.2 million animals in 2016, the highest level since 2008 when herds fell dramatically due to low returns and severe drought.

Argentinian pork production rose by 40% from 2001 to 2011, when it had a swine herd of nearly 3.5 million head.

De-beaking, de-toeing, tail-docking, tooth pulling, castration, and dehorning of livestock without anaesthetic are legal in Argentina, as is confinement in veal crates, gestation crates and battery cages.

== Animals used in research ==
In June 2015, a bill to prohibit testing cosmetics on animals was introduced to the Argentine Senate.

== Animal personhood ==
In 2014 an Argentine appeals court recognized the basic legal rights of an orangutan named Sandra who was born in a zoo. An advocacy group filed a petition for a writ of habeas corpus on Sandra's behalf, resulting in the court's declaration that the animal is a "non-human person".

== See also ==
- Timeline of animal welfare and rights
- Animal rights movement
- Animal consciousness
- Animal cruelty
- History of vegetarianism
