= Animal welfare and rights in Denmark =

Animal welfare and rights in Denmark relates to the treatment of and laws concerning non-human animals in Denmark. Denmark has moderately strong protections for animals by international standards. In 2014 and again in 2020, Denmark received a B grade on the A–G scale of the World Animal Protection's Animal Protection Index.

== Legislation ==
Animal welfare is the responsibility of the Ministry of Nature and Animal Welfare.

Denmark's Animal Welfare Act of 2013 requires anyone keeping animals to ensure adequate housing, feeding, watering, and care with regard for physiological, ethological, and health needs in agreement with established practical and scientific knowledge. The act therefore prohibits both direct abuse and neglect. These anti-cruelty provisions of the Animal Welfare Act 2013 apply to pets as well as farmed animals.

The Law also contains legislation dealing specifically with farmed animals, including requirements for holding areas that meet animals' needs and provide freedom of movement for eating, drinking, resting, and protection from the elements. Secondary legislation created under the Minister for Food, Agriculture, and Fisheries makes species-specific provisions for rearing, livestock transportation, and slaughter. Legislation on farmed animals largely exists to comply with European Union regulations on farmed animal welfare; however, Denmark's laws go beyond EU requirements in some cases, as with its removal of the religious exemption which for stunning prior to slaughter.

The treatment of animals used in research appears to be covered under the general anti-cruelty provisions of the Animal Welfare Law 2013. Denmark has also implemented EU regulations on animal testing, such that animal experiments causing harm are required to be approved by the Animal Experiments Inspectorate, to minimize harm, to have a clear scientific purpose, and use animals less prone to experiencing pain, suffering, and distress.

== Animal issues ==
=== Animals used for food ===
Statistics on the number of animals used for food in Denmark annually include:

- 486,000 bovine animals slaughtered (2014)
- 18.78 million pigs slaughtered (2014)
- 80,000 sheep slaughtered (2014)
- 102.99 million chickens slaughtered (2014)
- 668,000 tons of wild-caught marine animals (2013)
- 34,000 tons of aquaculture
- 3.3 million egg-laying hens in herd (2013)
- 570,000 dairy cows in herd (2015)

In 2014, Danske Egg—the trade organization handling 95% of eggs sold in Denmark—stopped purchasing eggs from barn and free-range producers who debeak their chickens.

In a 2011 survey, slightly less than 4% of Danish respondents self-identified as vegan or vegetarian. However, many of these still reported sometimes eating meat, a finding consistent with other surveys on self-reported vegetarianism. In 2016, Denmark's Council of Ethics—a government think-tank—stated that Danes are "ethically obligated" to reduce their beef consumption, though they cited only environmental concerns rather than reasons related to animal welfare or rights.

=== Animal experimentation ===
In 2016, official statistics reported that 273,224 experimental procedures were performed on vertebrates and cephalopods in Denmark.

=== Animals used for clothing ===
Fur farming is legal in Denmark, and Denmark is the world's largest producer of mink fur, producing approximately 19 million mink skins each year. Footage from investigations of Danish fur farms has shown mink engaging in abnormal behaviors such as pacing and repetitive circling/nodding of the head, as well as self-mutilation, due to being confined in small wire cages. Denmark banned fox fur farming in 2009, with a phase-out period for existing producers.

== Animal activism ==
Anima is a major Danish animal activist organization founded in 2000. Their past successful campaigns include a ban on cat dog fur in Denmark, the EU-wide ban on testing cosmetics on animals, banning the sale of foie gras in Danish supermarkets, and the Danish ban on fox fur farms.

Other notable animal rights organizations are Dyrenes Beskyttelse, Dansk Vegetarisk Forening and the small political party Veganerpartiet, who later fusioned with the larger green party The Alternative.

== See also ==
- Timeline of animal welfare and rights in Europe
- Mink industry in Denmark
- Animal welfare
- Animal rights
