= Animal welfare and rights in Mexico =

Treatment of and laws concerning non-human animals in Mexico

Animal welfare and rights in Mexico regards the treatment of and laws concerning non-human animals in Mexico.

Animal mutilations are prohibited, whose objective is to modify their appearance or achieve a non-medical purpose. In particular, the cutting of the tail, the cutting of the ears, the section of the vocal cords, as well as the removal of nails and teeth is prohibited, according to the Animal Protection Law.

Mexico has limited protections for animals by international standards.

== Legislation ==
Most of Mexico's states and the Federal District have prohibitions against animal cruelty. In Michoacan, Quintana Roo, and the Federal District, cruelty by negligence is included. This is not the case in Tlaxcala, and in Baja California applies only to certain kinds of animal. Chiapas and Baja California Sur did not have animal welfare protections as of November 2014.

The Federal Animal Health Act 2007 contains a number of provisions concerning the welfare of farm animals (not including aquatic animals). The main purpose of the Act is to diagnose, prevent, and control diseases in animals, but welfare is also addressed. Owners or keepers of domestic animals must provide adequate food and water, veterinarian supervision and immediate attention in case of injury. The Secretariat of Agriculture, Livestock, Rural Development, Fisheries and Food is responsible for protecting the health and welfare of animals in "primary production", determining rules on animal welfare, transport and slaughter. State-level anti-cruelty provisions also apply to farm animals.

In 2014, Mexico received a D out of possible grades A, B, C, D, E, F, G on World Animal Protection's Animal Protection Index. In 2020, Mexico received a C grade.

In December 2014, the Mexican Congress passed legislation banning the use of exotic animals in circuses. The legislation went into effect by July 2015.

In 2017, Mexico passed legislation which makes dogfighting a felony nationwide with criminal penalties.

In December 2024, President Claudia Sheinbaum signed constitutional reforms that included animal rights into the document. The change to Articles 3, 4, and 73 of the constitution required animal welfare education in schools, prohibited the mistreatment of all animals, granted power to pass animal welfare laws to the federal government respectively.

== Animals used for food ==
The majority of Mexican pigs are raised on intensive animal farming operations. Between 1990 and 2005, pig production increased by 50%, and by 2009 over 15 million pigs were slaughtered for food each year.

According to a 2016 world cattle inventory, Mexico has the ninth-largest cattle herd in the world at 16,450,000 cows.

In 2009, Mexico had the seventh-largest number of chickens at approximately 500 million.

De-beaking, de-toeing, tail-docking, tooth pulling, castration, and dehorning of livestock without anaesthetic is legal in Mexico, as is confinement in gestation crates and battery cages.

Animal mutilations are prohibited, whose objective is to modify their appearance or achieve a non-medical purpose. In particular, the cutting of the tail, the cutting of the ears, the section of the vocal cords, as well as the removal of nails and teeth is prohibited, according to the Animal Protection Law.

== Animals used in research ==
Testing cosmetics on animals is legal in Mexico. On March 19, 2020, however, the Mexican Senate unanimously passed legislation banning this practice. The proposed legislation now awaits approval from the lower house of the Mexican Congress, the Mexican Chamber of Deputies.

== Animal activism ==
The international animal nonprofit AnimaNaturalis protests against bullfighting in Mexico.

Humane Society International has a major chapter in Mexico, whose activities involve campaigns against dog-fighting, pet abuse, and advocacy for a vegan diet. The Humane Society International applauded Mexico's 2017 ban on dog-fighting. Bordertown Animal Rescue located at the US/Mex Border in Tijuana investigates acts of cruelty, illegal activity and has a facility that houses abused, abandoned and unwanted animals & wildlife.
