= Animal welfare and rights in Russia =

Russia has limited animal welfare protections and rights by international standards. There are also several high-profile cases of animal abuse in the country.

== Legislation ==
Russia's Penal Code addresses animal cruelty under its chapter on crimes against human health and public morality. The Code prohibits causing injury or death to an animal with malicious or mercenary motives, or with sadistic methods, or in the presence of minors.

Besides the anti-cruelty provisions of the Penal Code, there are no animal welfare laws addressing farm animals, companion animals, animals used in research, animals used for work, or animals used for recreation.

In 2014, Russia's animal protection regulations received an F out of possible grades in World Animal Protection's Animal Protection Index. It was increased to a D grade in the 2020 Animal Protection Index.

== Poaching and abuse ==
Abusing animals is a popular trend among the Russian elite. Ruling elites breach hunting laws but are seldom punished for it, while people who try to stop them are punished for getting in their way. Wealthy businessmen shoot bears for sport, not out of necessity. High-profile animal abusers include United Russia deputy Denis Khakhalov killed a wolf in an illegal hunt and took photos of doing it.

== Animal abuse during the 2022 Russian invasion of Ukraine ==
During the 2022 Russian invasion of Ukraine, the SBU intercepted a call of a Russian invader talking about their crew eating a Central Asian Shepherd Dog. One dog owner reported their dog killed by four Russian grenades thrown at it. Russian invaders set fire to a stable with 30 horses burned alive. Russians also engage in illegal hunting in nature reserves in occupied Ukraine.

== Animals used for food ==
In 2010, there were over 445 million chickens on Russian farms. 77 percent of these were on agricultural enterprises (as opposed to households and peasant farms), up from 68 percent in 2005.

A similar trend towards agricultural enterprises in pig farming was observed: from 2005 to 2010, agricultural enterprises increased pig inventories from 7 million to 11 million while rural households decreased from 6 million to 5.6 million. Cattle inventories on both farm types declined from 2005 to 2010: on agricultural enterprises, from 11 million down to 9.3 million, and among rural households from 9.6 million to 9.2 million.

Russian chicken and pig production has increasingly moved towards an intensive farming model. There are no regulations on animal farming other than the general anti-cruelty provision in the Penal Code. De-beaking, de-toeing, tail-docking, tooth pulling, castration, and dehorning of livestock without anaesthetic are legal, as is confinement in gestation crates and battery cages.

In 2014, Russian fishermen caught an estimated 4.215 million metric tons of wild fish. In 2016, annual aquaculture output was estimated at 160,000 metric tons.

== Animals used for research ==
Testing cosmetics on animals is legal in Russia. In 2015, Russian parliament considered a ban on this practice, but as of June 2016 no ban has been passed.

== Animals used for clothing ==
As of 2013 Russia was the world's largest fur market; 80% of Russians wear fur during the winter. It is also one of the fastest-growing markets for luxury furs.

Russia is a major producer of mink, with roughly 2.7 million pelts in 2011. Russia also produced about 120,000 fox skins in 2011.

Fur animals are raised on fur farms, which are unregulated except for the anti-cruelty provisions in the Penal Code, as well as trapped. The most popular form of trapping in Russia is the leg hold trap, which has been banned in 90 countries for being inhumane.

== Animal activism ==
VITA Animal Rights Center is a Russian animal activist organization whose activities include campaigning for better conditions for farm animals, promoting veganism, opposing fur production, pushing for the use of alternatives to animal testing, and addressing Russia's stray cat and dog program through sterilization and provision of shelter. In 2013, VITA organized anti-fur protests spanning 46 Russian cities. In 2014, VITA published undercover videos of circus trainers abusing circus animals by whipping, punching, kicking them and slamming their faces against the floor.

LAPA is a UK animal charity founded in 2013 to help Russian animals. Its goals are to reduce pet overpopulation through promoting sterilization and running sterilization programs, and to reduce animal cruelty through school educational programs.

One of the unusual shelters for animals was founded in Russia by Lily Gazizullina for cows destined for slaughter. She saved 24 cows so far. Lily Gazizullina was featured in the BBC season "100 women" 2016.

== See also ==
- Timeline of animal welfare and rights
- Animal rights movement
- Animal consciousness
- History of vegetarianism
- Pets of Vladimir Putin
