= Animal welfare and rights in Hong Kong =

Treatment of and laws concerning non-human animals in Hong Kong

Animal welfare and rights in Hong Kong relates to animal rights, such as the treatment of non-human animals in fields such as agriculture, hunting, medical testing, animal conservation, and the domestic ownership of animals in Hong Kong, and are generally protected under Cap. 169 Prevention of Cruelty to Animals Ordinance, Cap. 169A Prevention of Cruelty to Animals Regulations, Cap. 139 Public Health (Animals and Birds) Ordinance, Cap. 167 Dogs and Cats Ordinance and Cap. 421 Rabies Ordinance.

== See also ==
- Animal welfare and rights in China
- Animal rights by country or territory
- Chinese Animal Protection Network
- Lychee and Dog Meat Festival, held each June
- Dog meat in China
- Wang Yan (activist), dog rescuer
- List of animal rights advocates
- Speciesism
