= Animal welfare and rights in Austria =

Treatment of and laws concerning nonhuman animals in Austria

Animal welfare and rights in Austria is about the treatment of and laws concerning nonhuman animals in Austria. Austria has relatively advanced animal welfare laws by international standards.

== Legislation ==
The Austrian Animal Welfare Act 2004 is Austria's major piece of animal welfare legislation. The stated purpose of the Act is the "protection of the life and welfare of animals in light of the particular responsibility that mankind bears to animals as fellow creatures".

The Act prohibits inflicting unjustified pain, suffering, injury, or fear on an animal, though there are exemptions for hunting and fishing. The Act also prohibits neglecting proper accommodation, feeding, and care. It also creates a duty to provide for an animal's space, freedom of movement, climate, nutrition, and social contact, depending on the animal's physiological and ethological needs.

The anti-cruelty and duty of care provisions apply to animals on farms. There are also regulations specific to farmed animals. The Act prohibits surgeries other than for therapeutic or diagnostic reasons, which includes tail docking and debeaking. The First Regulation on Keeping Animals 2004, secondary legislation under the Animal Welfare Act 2004, creates minimum standards for keeping a range of domesticated mammals and farmed fish. The Animal Welfare Monitoring Regulation 2004 provides for inspections of animal farms. The Act stipulates that slaughter avoid "unnecessary pain, suffering, injury or distress" and requires stunning before slaughter. The law also phases out the use of battery cages by 2009 (or 2020 for recently-build cages).

The 2004 Act also bans fur farming and the use of wild animals in circuses.

In 2005 Austria banned using chimpanzees, gorillas and orangutans in experiments.

In 2014, Austria received an A out of possible grades A, B, C, D, E, F, G on World Animal Protection's Animal Protection Index. However, it was lowered to a B rating in their 2020 index.

== Animals used for food ==
=== Animal agriculture ===
Approximately 2 million cattle are kept on around 63,500 farms; 2.9 million pigs on 25,600 farms; 349,000 sheep and 70,700 goats on 22,800 farms; and 12.4 million chickens on 71,000 farms.

Being landlocked, Austria lacks a marine fishing fleet but does engage in fish farming. In 2014 Austria produced 3.39 million kilograms of edible farmed fish.

=== Veganism ===
According to a 2013 survey, 9% of Austria respondents identified as vegetarian or vegan.

== Animal personhood ==
Article 285 of the Austrian Civil Code states that "animals are not objects; they are protected by special laws". However, they are not legal persons. In 2008, an Austrian court rejected a petition by the animal rights group Association Against Animal Factories to have a chimpanzee named Matthew Hiasl Pan declared a person.

== Animal activism ==
=== 2003-2004 campaign ===
In 2003, Austrian animal activists launched a campaign which culminated in the passage of the Austrian Animal Welfare Act 2004. The campaign began as an effort to ban battery farming, in which egg-laying hens are kept in extreme confinement. Starting in March 2003, activists engaged in direct action including the occupation of the office of a provincial governor who failed to respond to animal welfare violations on battery farms; filming conditions at battery farms across Austria; and openly rescuing battery chickens.

The campaign continued after the government released a proposal for a new animal welfare law, which only provided for compliance with new European Union regulations on cages rather than banning them altogether, in early 2004. Street demonstrations were held, and a media and letter-writing campaign against the Conservatives - who largely opposed stricter animal laws - commenced. After continuing pressure from activists and the public, Austrian Parliament voted unanimously in favor of a ban on battery farming effective January 1, 2009.

During the campaign, Austrian animal rights leader Martin Balluch had been convicted of unlawful removal of property for his open rescue of battery farmed chickens. Balluch appealed the decision, however, and it was overturned by the High Court. The Court argued that Balluch's actions were justified since the new law characterizes battery farming as cruelty and society agrees with the liberation of the chickens raised in cruel conditions.

=== 2008 arrests ===
In 2008, 10 animal rights activists including Balluch were arrested on accusations of belonging to a criminal organization and engaging in criminal activity. Balluch went on a hunger strike during his jail time, and was eventually released after over 100 days without ever having been charged.

=== Organizations ===
==== Association Against Animal Factories ====
The Association Against Animal Factories (German: Verein gegen Tierfabriken (VGT)), co-founded and led by Martin Balluch, is a major Austrian animal rights organization. Their focus is opposing intensive animal farming, though they list the abolition of animal testing, the abolition of hunting, and the promotion of veganism as other aims. Their website states that "the basic idea of VGT is to establish animal rights". VGT played a large role in the 2004 campaign against battery farming, the passage of Austria's Animal Welfare Law, as well as a campaign to convince Austrian stores not to sell battery eggs, a ban on using apes in experiments, the Austrian ban on fur farming, among other animal rights victories.

==== Animal Care Austria ====
Animal Care Austria (ACA) is an animal welfare organization founded by American vocalist Carol Byers. ACA focuses on adoption, medical care, castration, and sanctuary for companion and stray animals in Austria and several other countries.

== See also ==
- Timeline of animal welfare and rights
- Animal rights movement
- History of vegetarianism
- Animal consciousness
