= Animal welfare and rights in Italy =

In Italy, the Ministry of Health is responsible for animal welfare. Each province within Italy has an official appointed to the Office of Animal Rights. Their main objective is to address stray and abandoned animal issues. Italy also has passed legal protections for animals, as well as being home to several animal rights organizations.

== History ==
On November 13, 1987, Italy signed the European Convention on the protection of pets, a treaty of the Council of Europe for Companion Animals ensuring minimum protection standards are met.

Legislative decree No. 281/1991 states the standards for the treatment of companion and stray animals. It states that an owner must register dogs, and anyone who abandons their animals will be fined. It also prohibits the killing of stray dogs and cats unless the animal is affected by an incurable disease or is a proven danger. These killings can only be performed by a veterinarian.

In 2006, Italy's first arrest for animal mistreatment occurred when a man repeatedly tossed his dog into wall injuring its back.

In June 2017, Italy's highest court ruled that lobsters could not be kept on ice before being cooked.

In November 2017, the Italian Parliament passed a bill to ban circus animals over the following year.

Following the 2018 death of a popular rescue dog named Kaos who saved people during the August 2016 Central Italy earthquake, animal rights activists, including the organization Animalisti Italiani, called for strengthened civil rights for non-human animals.

In December 2021, the Italian Budget Senate Committee approved a ban on fur farming starting from 30 June 2022.

In February 2022, the Italian Parliament approved a law to change the Constitution of Italy to include that the state must safeguard both animals and the natural environment (ecosystems and biodiversity) "in the interest of future generations".

== Protection laws ==
=== Protection for animals in farming ===
==== Rearing ====
The protection of animals kept for farming purposes specifies, to the farming community, conditions for all species of animals kept for the production of food, wool, skin, fur, etc. The law states that animals should be provided with food, water, care, and any other factor needed to satisfy the overall well-being of the animal. Animals should be given freedom of movement and satisfactory environmental conditions. Also, animals that require the constant attention of humans should be inspected at least once a day. In the event of breeding, any procedure that is likely to cause suffering or harm must not be carried out. No animal should be kept for farming purposes if it is considered a danger to their health.

In Italy, Legislative Decree No. 146/2001 implements Council Directive 98/58/EC concerning the protection of animals kept for farming purposes. Animals are defined as being any animal, including fish, reptiles and amphibians bred or kept for the production of foodstuffs, wool, leather, furs or for other agricultural purpose. The Decree excludes invertebrates and experimental animals, animals living in the wild, and animals destined to participate in competitions, exhibitions, events, cultural/sporting events.

==== Transport ====
All individuals involved in the transportation of live animals entering or leaving the EU should not transport animals or cause animals to be transported in a way likely to cause injury or undue suffering to them. Long journeys, exceeding a maximum of 8 hours are prohibited unless the means of transport has been inspected and approved under Article 18.

==== Slaughter ====
At the time of slaughter, animals should be spared any unbearable pain or suffering. Animals should be stunned prior to being slaughtered, ensuring animals are unconscious until death. Workers should take in consideration that unconsciousness is maintained throughout the whole process.

=== Animals in captivity ===
==== Zoos ====
Zoos should be licensed and should implement conservation measures. The maintenance of a high standard of animal husbandry suited to the individual needs of each animal is required. Stress-free Environmental factors such as zoo enclosure sizes, temperature and furnishing are important for animal welfare. Animal welfare transportation laws are applicable. Wild Animals will be given the chance to adapt to transportation before departures.

==== Private keeping of wild animals ====
Keeping animals in conditions ‘incompatible with their nature’ and producing ‘grave suffering’ is prohibited.

== Animal rights organizations ==
Animal rights organizations in Italy include:

- Animal Liberation Front Italia
- Lega anti vivisezione
- Organizzazione internazionale protezione animali
- Ente Nazionale Protezioni Animali
- Italian Animalist Party

== See also ==
- Italian Animalist Party
