= European Convention for the Protection of Animals during International Transport =

Animal welfare policy

1968 animal transport convention
European Convention for the Protection of Animals during International Transport
- Signed: 13 December 1968
- Location: Paris, France
- Effective: 20 February 1971
- Condition: 4 ratifications by Council of Europe member states
- Signatories: 15 states (Note: This excludes the 10 states who had signed and ratified the original 1968 convention, but later denounced it after having signed and ratified the revised 2003 convention.)
- Ratifiers: 14 states
- Depositary: Secretary General of the Council of Europe
- Citations: CETS No. 65
- Languages: English and French

2003 animal transport convention
European Convention for the Protection of Animals during International Transport (Revised)
- Signed: 6 November 2003
- Location: Chișinău, Romania
- Effective: 14 March 2006
- Condition: 4 ratifications by Council of Europe member states
- Signatories: 19 states + EU
- Ratifiers: 13 states
- Depositary: Secretary General of the Council of Europe
- Citations: CETS No. 193
- Languages: English and French

European Convention for the Protection of Animals during International Transport (1968 original): Signed and ratified / Acceded or succeeded; Only signed / Not signed (CoE member states); Not signed (non-CoE member states) / Denounced in favour of 2003 revised convention

European Convention for the Protection of Animals during International Transport (2003 revision): Signed and ratified / Acceded or succeeded; Only signed / Not signed (CoE member states); Not signed (non-CoE member states)

European Convention for the Protection of Animals during International Transport refers to two animal welfare treaties regarding livestock transportation (including live export) of the Council of Europe:

- CETS No.65: The original convention was adopted by the Council of Europe on 13 December 1968 in Paris, and went into effect on 20 February 1971.
- CETS No.193: The revised convention, with "(Revised)" in the title, was adopted by the Council of Europe on 6 November 2003 in Chișinău, and went into effect on 14 March 2006. It intends to replace the original 1968 animal transport convention, and requires Parties of the 1968 convention to denounce it before ratifying the 2003 convention. Until they denounce it, the 1968 convention remains into effect for the Parties who ratified it.

== Development ==
Due to increased public awareness and debate about animal welfare in the 1960s, the Council of Europe became more concerned with the topic, and adopted a convention of minimum requirements for animal transport in Paris on 13 December 1968: the original European Convention for the Protection of Animals during International Transport. Next, it adopted the European Convention for the Protection of Animals kept for Farming Purposes (or Farm Animal Convention) in 1976. The European Convention for the Protection of Animals for Slaughter (or Slaughter Convention) followed in 1979, and was revised in 1991. All these conventions were based on animal welfare recommendations resulting from the latest scientific research in applied ethology. The Farm Animal Convention worked as an overarching, open framework law that could be further elaborated later, while the transport and slaughter conventions were much more detailed, 'closed' and finalised in character.

In the years after 1968, a gradual change emerged in companies' preferred modes of transport from trains and boats to road transport, because it was often faster, more flexible and required fewer staff, and was therefore cheaper for companies. On the other hand, this made oversight for the national authorities more complicated, and combined with a lack of effective monitoring mechanisms on the European level, the contents of the 1968 convention were eventually regarded and recognised as flawed, and in need of revision. In 1996, an extensive media campaign drew attention to serious violations in animal transport practices across Europe, compelling the Parties to act. With the experience gained from 30 years of applying the 1968 convention and taking note of its shortcomings, as well as the conclusions from new scientific research done in that period, the Council of Europe revised the treaty with the cooperation of the European Union, which introduced very similar legal instruments. The revised convention was adopted on 6 November 2003 in Chișinău; it had a more open character as a framework convention, with more details to be added in technical protocols that were to be drawn up later. The 2003 revised convention went into force on 14 March 2006.

== Contents ==
The original 1968 convention established rules for 'the preparation of animals for loading, the loading itself, the design of the means of transport, the animals' fitness for transport, transport conditions, veterinary checks, the handling of animals, certificates and specific aspects of the various modes of transport (rail, road, water or air).'

The revised 2003 convention has many of the same rules as the original, but a more open character as a framework convention, with additional regulations, and more details to be added in technical protocols that were to be drawn up later. These protocols are to deal with 'minimum space allowances and the maximum duration of journeys, minimum intervals for watering and feeding the animals and minimum periods of rest.'

== Status ==
The 1968 convention was signed and ratified by 25 states, 10 of which later denounced it after having signed and ratified the revised 2003 convention. No Eastern Bloc state ever signed or ratified it until after the Revolutions of 1989: Czech Republic did so in 1998, Lithuania in 2003/2004. Bulgaria is the only country which only signed the 1968 convention (on 21 May 2003, a few months before the revised convention was adopted on 6 November 2003) without ratifying it afterwards; it did subsequently sign and ratify the 2003 convention.

As of May 2021, the 2003 convention has so far been signed by 19 states and the EU, and ratified by 13 states. 10 of the 13 ratifiers previously signed, ratified and denounced the 1968 convention, 3 states (Bulgaria, Estonia and Slovenia) are new ratifiers, 4 states (Belgium, Finland, Italy and the United Kingdom) have signed but not yet ratified the 2003 convention and are still applying the 1968 convention, and 2 states (Croatia and Moldova) and the EU have never signed the 1968 convention, and so far only signed but not ratified the 2003 convention.

== See also ==
- Animal rights by country or territory
- List of international animal welfare conventions
