= Directive 2010/63/EU =

European Union legislation

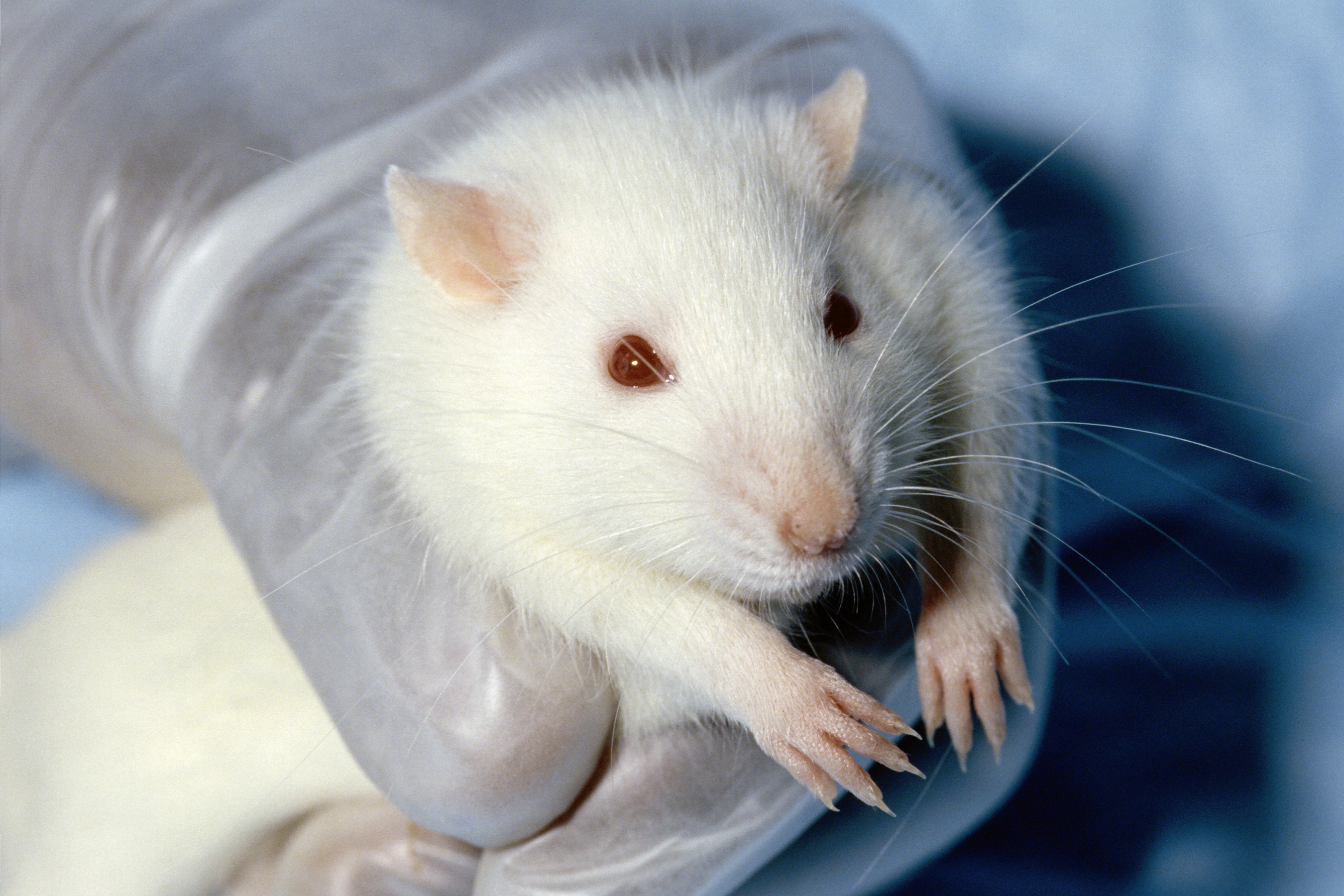
Directive 2010/63/EU is the European Union legislation that protects animals being used in research.

Directive 2010/63/EU is the European Union (EU) legislation "on the protection of animals used for scientific purposes" and is one of the most stringent ethical and welfare standards worldwide.

The Directive repealed Directive 86/609/EEC. It became formally applied across the EU on 1 January 2013. It protects live non-human vertebrates including independently feeding larval forms and foetal forms of mammals from the last third of their normal development, and live cephalopods.

== History ==
The Directive is based on the Council of Europe's European Convention for the Protection of Vertebrate Animals used for Experimental and other Scientific Purposes (ETS123) established in 1986. The EU is a party to this convention as are several EU and non-EU members.

The Directive repealed Directive 86/609/EEC. It took nearly two years to revise, beginning in November 2008. It was finalised and signed on 22 September 2010, coming into force on 9 November 2010. Member States were then allowed one year to transpose it into their own words before it became formally applied across the EU on 1 January 2013.

The ultimate aim of the Directive is to replace animals in research.

== Scope ==
Because it is a Directive, it allows Member States certain flexibility in transposition of national rules. The status of the implementation of the new Directive in the EU is described by the EC General Environment Directorate. Purposes of this Directive are to provide scope (via Articles 1 & 3), harmonise the current EU understanding of what defines an animal (Article 1.3), map resources, identify competent people and authorities (Articles 47.5 & 48), establish a common framework, and promote collaboration of the Member States with the EC to promote animal welfare in the EU as a European value in Article 13 of the Treaty of the Functioning of the EU (TFEU).

Animal welfare is not an EU policy area per se as for example agriculture, fisheries and research, but rather that "In formulating and implementing the Union's agriculture, fisheries, transport, internal markets, research, technological development, and space policies, the Union and the Member States shall, since animals are sentient beings, pay full regard to the welfare of animals, while respecting the legislative or administrative provisions and customs of the Member States relating in particular to religious rites, cultural traditions and regional heritage". As with most EU legislation when animal welfare is not respected; one must refer a complaint directly to the Member State. Promotion and use of alternative animal testing methods and 3Rs are written elsewhere within EU legislation (e.g. REACH, Cosmetics, PPP, Biocides ...). EU agencies (ECHA, EMA, EFSA) also contribute to the protection of laboratory animals used for scientific purposes.

The Directive now protects cephalopods such as this Caribbean reef squid (Sepioteuthis sepioidea).

Article 1.3: The new EU Directive applies to the following animals: (a) live non-human vertebrate animals, including: (i) independently feeding larval forms; and (ii) foetal forms of mammals from the last third of their normal development; (b) live cephalopods.

Article 4: The Directive refers directly to the Three Rs (3Rs): "Principle of replacement, reduction and refinement" first described by Russell and Burch in 1959.

Article 47-2: Member States shall assist the Commission in identifying and nominating suitable specialised and qualified laboratories to carry out such validation studies.

== Laboratories for the Validation of Alternative Methods ==
In July 2013, the Commission announced the creation of European Union Network of Laboratories for the Validation of Alternative Methods (EU-NETVAL) EU-NETVAL's primary role is to provide support for the European Union Reference Laboratory for Alternatives to Animal Testing (EURL ECVAM) validation projects, including aspects of training and dissemination, and the identification of methods that have a potential to reduce, refine or replace animals used for scientific purposes. Any EU laboratory is allowed to apply as long as they follow the eligibility criteria listed by the EC, such as sufficient scientific staff, adequate equipment and GLP/or ISO certificates. As of March 2016, there are 38 test facilities: Belgium (3) Czech Republic (1), European Commission (1), Finland (1), France (3), (Germany) (6), Hungary (1), Italy (8), the Netherlands (2), Poland (2), Slovakia (1), Spain (3), Sweden (1), Switzerland (2) and the United Kingdom (2).
