= European Convention for the Protection of Pet Animals =

1979 Council of Europe convention on domestic animal welfare

Pet Convention
European Convention for the Protection of Pet Animals
- Signed: 13 November 1987
- Location: Strasbourg, France
- Effective: 1 May 1992
- Condition: 4 ratifications by Council of Europe member states
- Signatories: 27 states
- Ratifiers: 27 states
- Depositary: Secretary General of the Council of Europe
- Citations: CETS No. 125
- Languages: English and French

The European Convention for the Protection of Pet Animals is a treaty of the Council of Europe to promote the welfare of pet animals and ensure minimum standards for their treatment and protection. The treaty was signed in 1987 and became effective on 1 May 1992, after at least four countries had ratified it. Adherence to the treaty is open and not limited to member countries of the Council of Europe. As of February 2025, it has been ratified by 27 states (most recently by Moldova in 2025).

== Content ==
The convention is divided into seven chapters:

1. General provisions
2. Principles for the keeping of pet animals
3. Supplementary measures for stray animals
4. Information and education
5. Multilateral consultations
6. Amendments
7. Final provisions

== Parties ==
European Convention for the Protection of Pet Animals: Signed and ratified / Acceded or succeeded; Only signed / Not signed (CoE member states); Not signed (non-CoE member states)

Parties to the European Convention for the Protection of Pet Animals
Country	Signed	Ratified	Entry into force
Andorra	28 January 2022	19 October 2022	1 May 2023
Austria	2 October 1997	10 August 1999	1 March 2000
Azerbaijan	22 October 2003	19 October 2007	1 May 2008
Belgium	13 November 1987	20 December 1991	1 July 1992
Bulgaria	21 May 2003	20 July 2004	1 February 2005
Cyprus	9 December 1993	9 December 1993	1 July 1994
Czech Republic	24 June 1998	23 September 1998	1 April 1999
Denmark*	13 November 1987	20 October 1992	1 May 1993
Finland	2 December 1991	2 December 1991	1 July 1992
France	18 December 1996	3 October 2003	1 May 2004
Germany	21 June 1988	27 May 1991	1 May 1992
Greece	13 November 1987	29 April 1992	1 November 1992
Italy	13 November 1987	19 April 2011	1 November 2011
Latvia	1 March 2010	22 October 2010	1 May 2011
Lithuania	11 September 2003	19 May 2004	1 December 2004
Luxembourg	13 November 1987	25 October 1991	1 May 1992
Moldova	13 September 2024	26 February 2025	1 September 2025
Netherlands	13 November 1987	15 December 2022	1 July 2023
Norway	13 November 1987	3 February 1988	1 May 1992
Portugal	13 November 1987	28 June 1993	1 January 1994
Romania	23 June 2003	6 August 2004	1 March 2005
Serbia	2 December 2010	2 December 2010	1 July 2011
Spain	9 October 2015	29 July 2017	1 February 2018
Sweden	14 March 1989	14 March 1989	1 May 1992
Switzerland	13 November 1990	3 November 1993	1 June 1994
Turkey	18 November 1999	28 November 2003	1 June 2004
Ukraine	5 July 2011	9 January 2014	1 August 2014
Countries in italics do allow tail docking. * The Convention does not apply to the Faroe Islands and Greenland.

A review of the treaty performed in 1995 resulted in minor modifications of the text and allowed signatory states to declare themselves exempt from certain paragraphs of the treaty. Subsequently, a number of additional countries signed and ratified the treaty, making use of this provision by declaring themselves exempt from the prohibition of tail docking. No country that has ratified the treaty has made any reservations regarding the other cosmetic surgeries prohibited by §10: cropping of ears, removal of vocal cords, and declawing.

== See also ==
- Animal law
- Animal rights by country or territory
- Cruelty to animals
- List of Council of Europe treaties
- List of international animal welfare conventions
