= Livestock transportation =

Movement of livestock by ship, rail, road or air

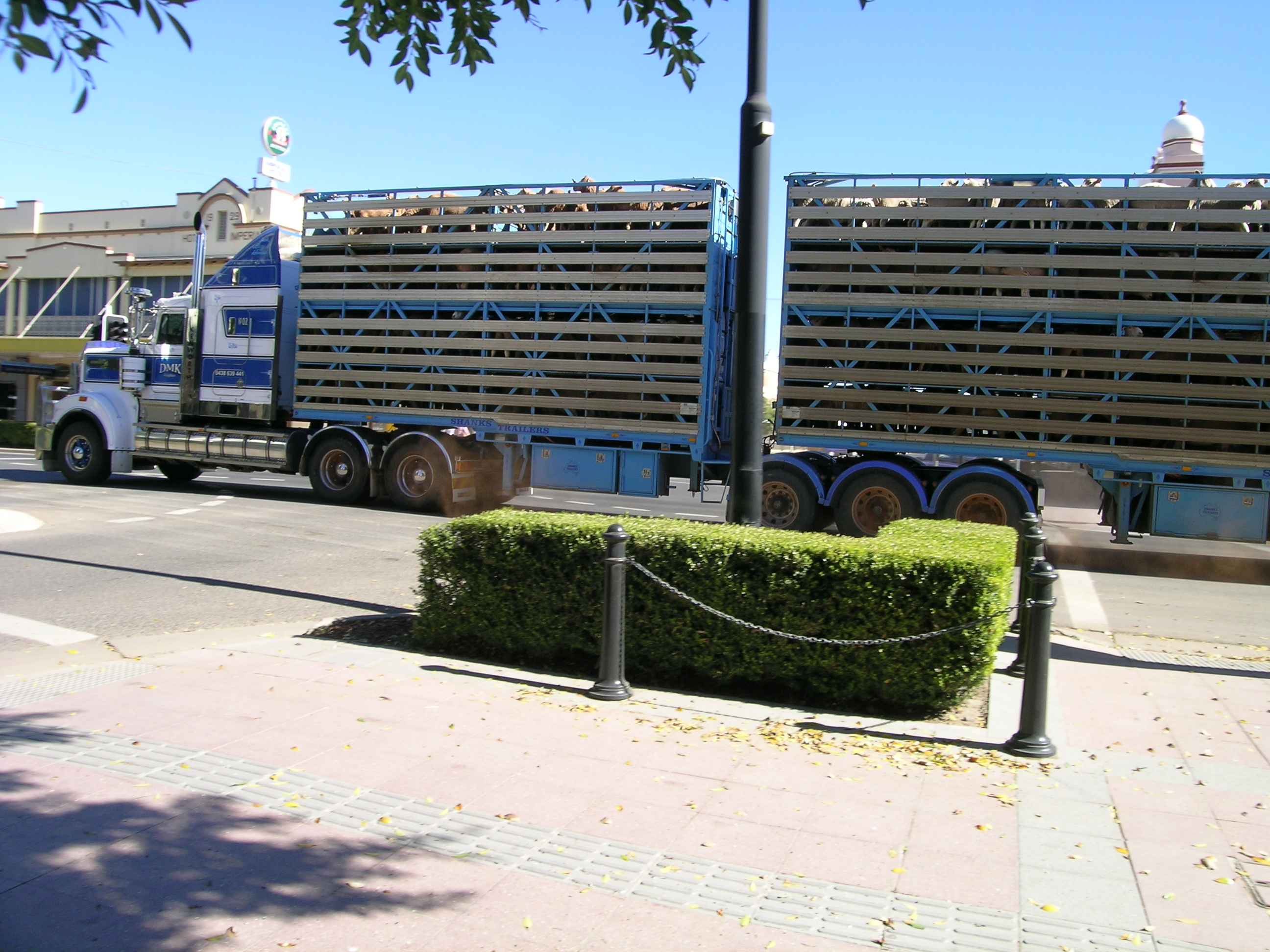
Sheep in a B Double truck, Moree, NSW, Australia

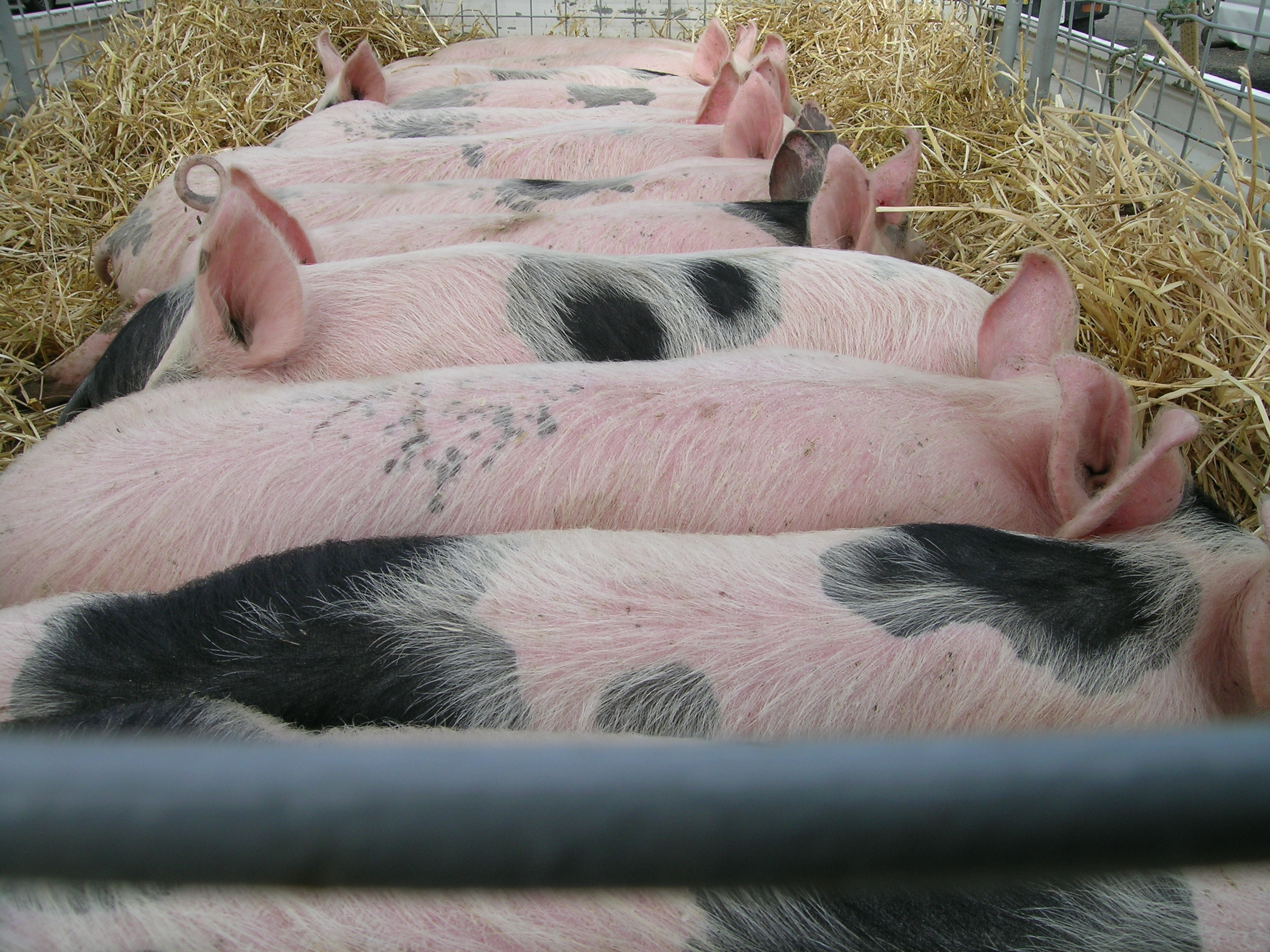
Twelve pigs being transported to an auction sale.

Livestock transportation is the movement of livestock, by road, rail, ship, or air. Livestock are transported for many reasons, including slaughter, auction, breeding, livestock shows, rodeos, fairs, and grazing. When the movement crosses borders into another country, it is known as live export.

== History ==
Throughout most of human prehistory and history, the primary means of livestock transportation was by droving. The reason was usually either for seasonal grazing movement (to move them to a summer grazing range or to move them to an overwintering range or shelter) or to bring them to market of one form or another, whether bartering livestock (between farmers) or selling them (whether as stores, as for example with, store cattle, or as fattened/finished animals for slaughter). The distances involved in droving were usually only a few miles, although they could occasionally be much longer under certain economic conditions in some times and places. In archipelagos, livestock transport by boats has occurred since ancient times, although the scale of such transport (as opposed to shipping in large ships) is limited. Beginning in the 17th century, shipping in larger ships began to make sea transport of livestock easier, faster, and scalable. Beginning in the 19th century, canal barges and railways began to make overland livestock transportation easier, faster, and scalable.

=== Early shipping ===
The first known records of livestock transportation by ship occurred in about 1607 on an English ship named the Susan Constant, which was transporting Jamestown bound colonists. As time passed and the New World developed, supply ships from England carried livestock as regular cargo. Purebred stock was imported to Plymouth and Philadelphia. By about 1700, the exports of cattle and packed meat regularly left the port of Philadelphia which was bound for the West Indies. Livestock fatalities during sea shipments would often be 50% or more, which was attributed to poor feed supply, overcrowding, and rough seas.

=== 19th century ===
Chicago's meat exports had risen to almost 10% by 1848. Supposedly the first shipment of live cattle to Chicago by rail car was in 1867 on the Kansas Pacific Railway. About twenty carloads of Longhorns from Texas left the rail yard at Abilene, Kansas on the Kansas Pacific Railroad destined for the Chicago Stock Yards. This event changed the face of the livestock industry. Cattle from Texas were driven to rail yards for transport to major feeders, processors, and packers. Cattle trails were carefully chosen to minimize distance and maximize feed to sustain and fatten cattle. Cowboys were hired to gather, drive, and hold cattle at major buying stations. Cowboys reported route trail fatalities of about 3%. As the railroads expanded, processors multiplied and refrigeration technology developed, the refrigerated rail car was patented in 1867. The need to drive cattle ended and the cattle drive trail disappeared by 1889. The improvement of refrigerated transport gave birth to the dressed meat market. The distribution of dressed meat exploded, causing the need to ship live cattle by rail to slowly decrease and to become economically unfeasible.

=== 20th century ===
By the early 20th century, railroads dominated the dressed meat market and the commodity trucking industry was in its infancy. By the middle of the 20th century, the refrigerated trailer was developed for commercial trucking and then the shipping of processed meats was done primarily by the trucking industry, and livestock-hauling trailers for motor trucks became well-developed. The rail roads had fallen into disrepair nor could they offer as many options for shipping and receiving of cattle and other livestock. Shipping live cattle by truck was much more economical, humane and offered more options in routing cattle to auctions, feeders, and processors. The trucking industry helped to create an interconnected road system throughout the United States. The development of widespread, affordable, convenient livestock trucking brought the end of widespread droving on public roads in many countries, a transition that happened between the 1910s and the 1940s. It coincided with the transition in which public roads in those countries changed from pedestrian-focused commons to motor-vehicle-dominated right-of-ways. In other words, the idea that livestock "don't belong in the roadway" did not exist until automobiles became widespread and dominant. Droving on public roads continues to be important in many countries or regions, albeit usually on a small scale today.

=== 21st century ===
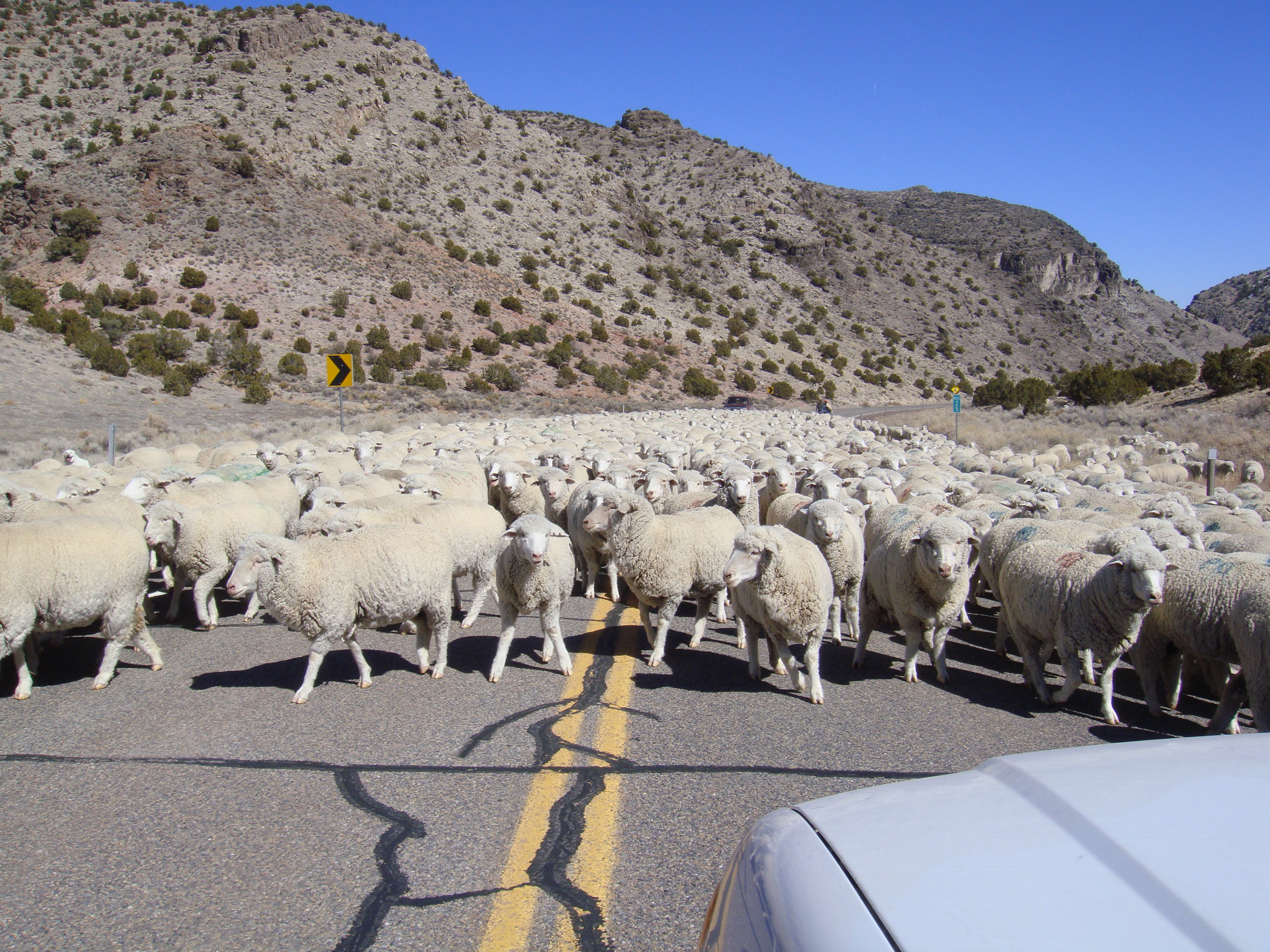
Sheep droving in Utah.

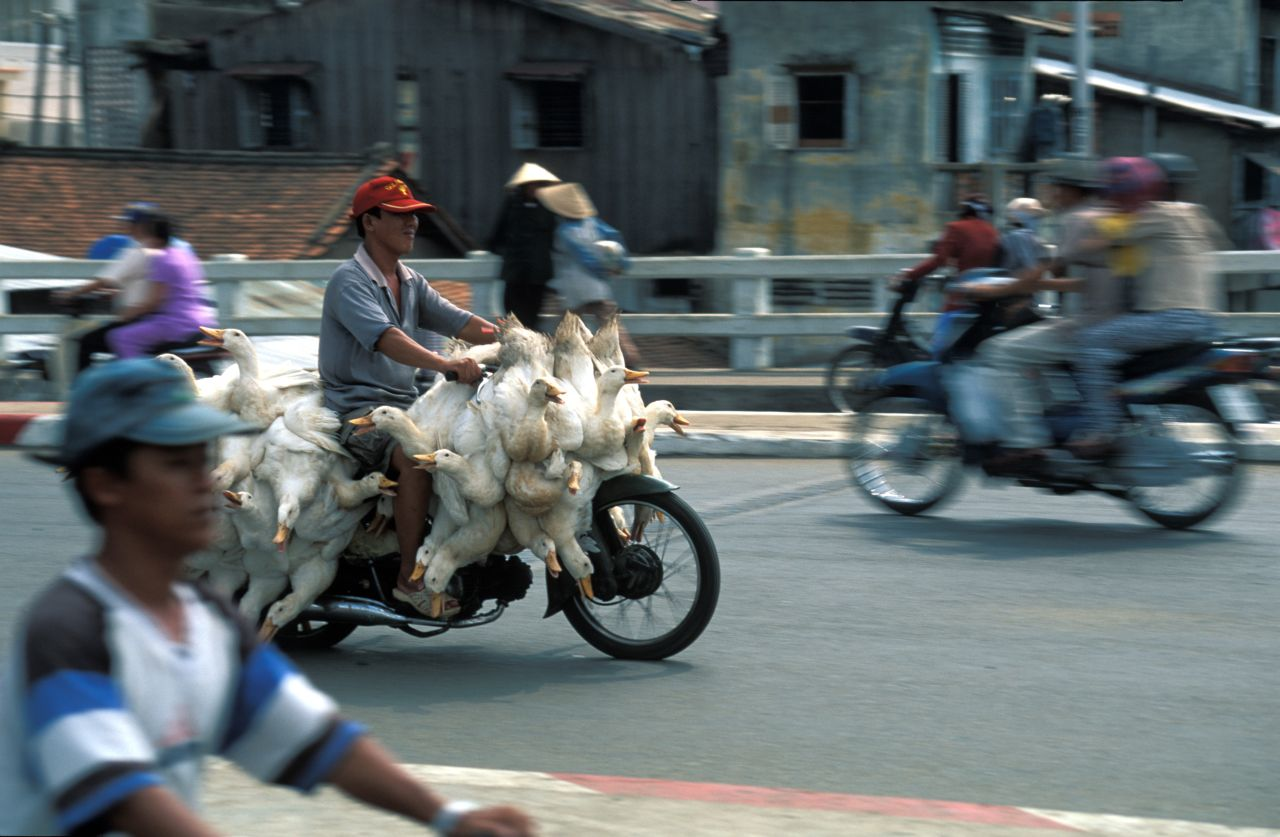
Animal transport as used in Ho Chi Minh City, Vietnam

Today most livestock and processed meat is transported by trucking companies that have specialized trailers for this purpose. Droving or herding, the movement of animals over ground, is still used in more remote or local areas.

== Legal status ==
Due to concerns for animal welfare, livestock transportation has been the subject of legislation seeking to secure the wellbeing of livestock, either by imposing restrictions or obligations on transporters, or by limiting transportation itself. Animal welfare organisations have been campaigning for live exports to be banned completely. According to RSPCA Australia senior policy officer Jed Goodfellow, livestock transportation 'is inherently high-risk, with decades of repeated evidence of suffering and cruelty.'

In September 2020, Dutch Agriculture Minister Carola Schouten requested the EU Agriculture and Fisheries Council to adjust animal welfare regulations and limit the transport of livestock for slaughter; a special EU committee on animal transport commenced hearings in October. UK Environment Secretary George Eustice unveiled plans to ban the export of live animals for slaughter and fattening from England and Wales on 3 December 2020. The plans still had to be finalised, would exclude poultry and not affect Northern Ireland (under EU law), but Scotland would probably follow the example of England and Wales. Shortly before, a regional court in Germany prohibited the live exportation of 132 breeding heifers because the conditions under which they would be slaughtered in Morocco would be "inhumane".

On 14 April 2021, the Government of New Zealand announced that, in order to raise animal welfare standards, it had decided to phase out the export of livestock by sea by 2023 after a transition period of up to two years. It was the first country in history to do so; activists called on Australia and other states to follow suit.

== See also ==
- European Convention for the Protection of Animals during International Transport (1968, revised 2003)
- Horse trailer
- Livestock carrier
- Stock car (rail)
- Transhumance
