= Livestock dehorning =

Removal of the horns from livestock

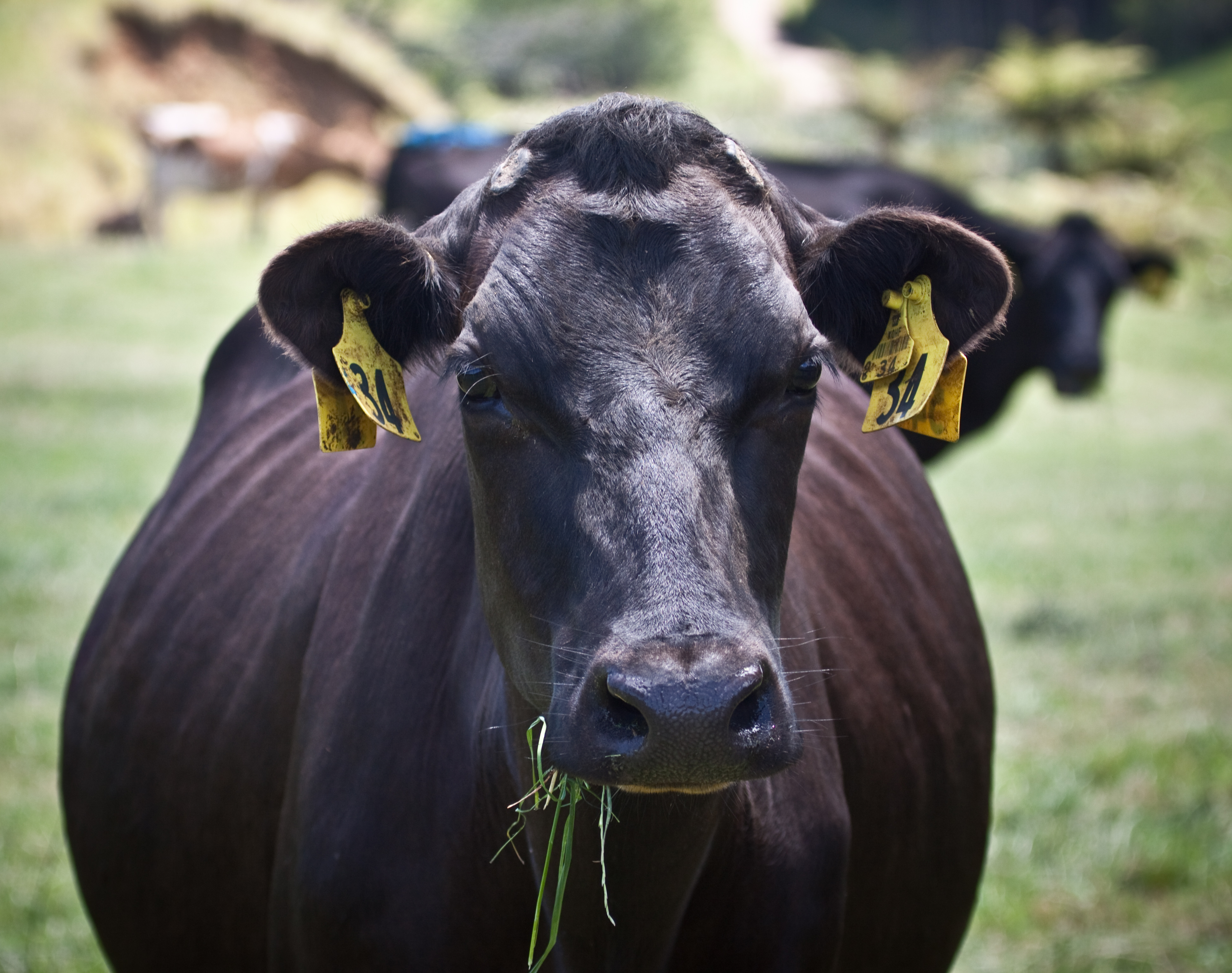
A dehorned beef cow in New Zealand

Dehorning is the process of removing the horns of livestock. Cattle, sheep, and goats are sometimes dehorned for economic and safety reasons. Disbudding is a different process with similar results; it cauterizes and thus destroys horn buds before they have grown into horns. Disbudding is performed early in an animal's life, as are other procedures such as docking and castration. Not all horned livestock are disbudded, and the environment and use of the animal affects whether the farmer wishes to perform the procedure. Horns are removed because they can pose a risk to humans, other animals, and to the bearers of the horns themselves, as horns are sometimes caught in fences or prevent feeding.

Some breeds of cattle and sheep are naturally hornless and are called polled livestock. This is controlled by genetics. Although polled variants of cattle and sheep are commonly raised, some varieties of livestock species cannot easily be bred to lack horns naturally. The gene linked to a polled nature in goats was linked to hermaphrodism in a single study several decades ago, although fertile polled goats have been bred.

In general, disbudding is vastly preferred to dehorning, as dehorning is a difficult, painful, and dangerous procedure. Instead, most farmers desiring hornless livestock disbud their animals while young, when the process is comparatively quick and easy. Dehorning is controversial because of the pain it causes. Dehorning is only recommended with local anesthesia and sedation by a veterinarian or a trained professional. Removal of larger horns is usually performed during spring and autumn to avoid fly season. In cases of very large horns, "tipping" (removal of the tip of the horn) is sometimes performed instead to minimize bleeding.

== Rationale ==
=== Removal ===
Reasons invoked in support of keeping polled or disbudded animals include the following:

- Horns may cause injuries to handlers or other animals.
- Horned animals take up more space and can require specialized equipment, which affects the design at the feed bunk, during transportation, and in structures such as cattle crushes.
- In some breeds and in some individuals, horns may grow towards the head, eventually causing injury or difficulty feeding in long-lived animals.
- Horned animals may become trapped in fences or vegetation, causing self-injury.
- Horned animals may become more aggressive than those without horns, especially around feed.
- For certain uses, such as show livestock for use with kids, horns are not allowed due to safety reasons.
- In the case of a horned animal being integrated with an already polled herd or flock, it is considered safest to also dehorn the newcomer.

=== Remaining horned ===
Arguments for keeping horned animals include:

- Horns are natural and beautiful. They are traditional in some breeds, and breed standards may require their presence (for example, Texas Longhorn, Highland and White Park cattle).
- Dehorning without the use of anesthesia is extremely painful to the animal. A 2011 study that surveyed 639 farmers found that 52 percent of farmers reported that disbudding caused pain lasting more than six hours, that only 10 percent of the farmers used local anesthesia before cauterization, 5 percent provided calves with postoperative analgesia, and that farmers "indicated limited willingness to pay the cost of analgesia or to call a veterinarian to perform the procedure."
- In the cases of horned adults being considered for dehorning, recovery can take weeks of painful treatment to heal, and leave the animal at greater risk of infection during recovery.
- Horned livestock are better able to defend themselves and their young from predators such as wolves and dogs.
- Horns provide a point for roping or holding the animal's head (although this tactic is ideally not overused).
- In some areas horns are of cultural significance, being decorated or guided into specific shapes.
- Some types of yokes used by work oxen require the presence of horns.
- Horns are useful for thermoregulation and help cool the animal, particularly in hot climates or when working, due to the blood vessels in the horn. Horns are almost always kept on pack goats and work oxen.

== Procedure ==
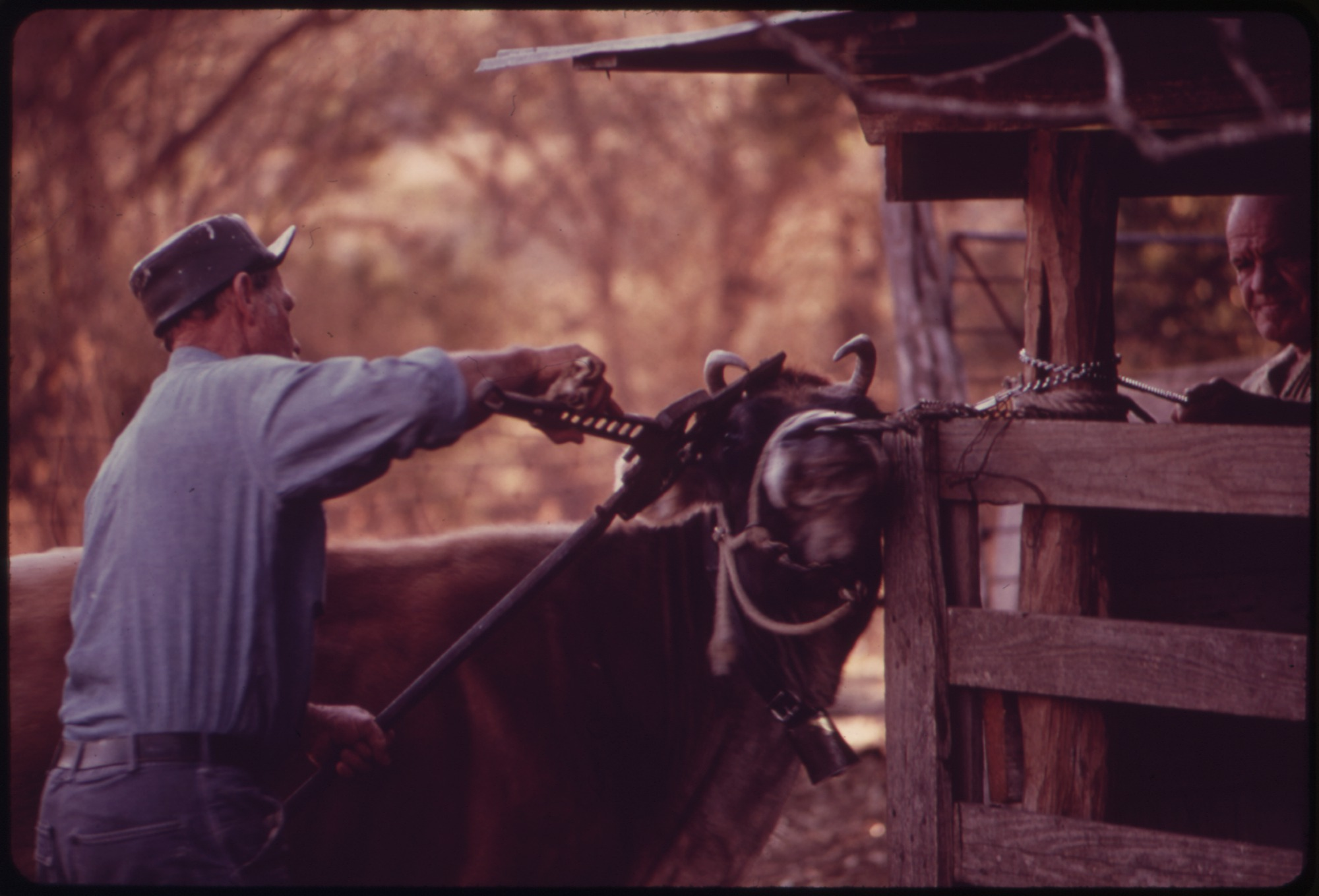
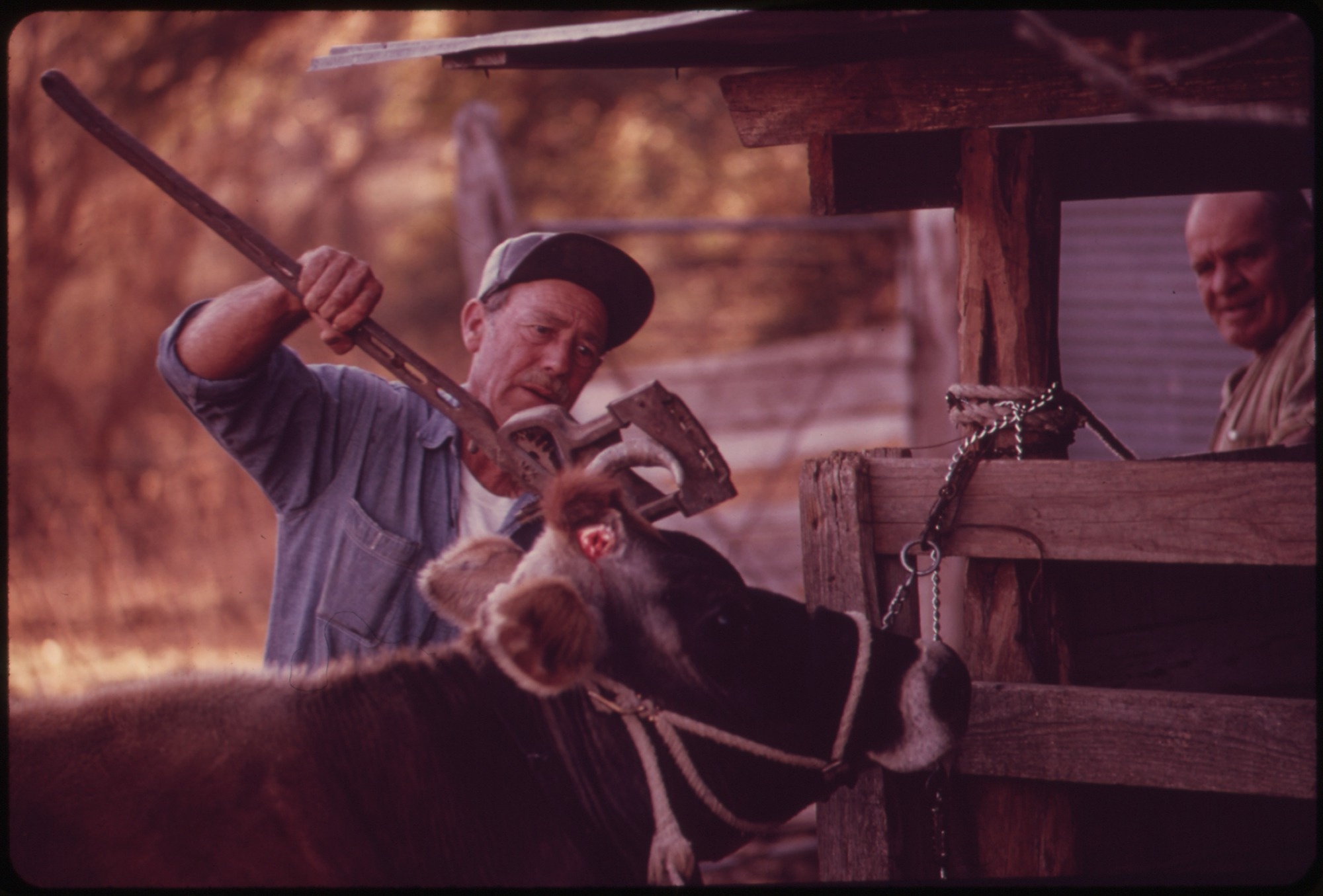
A cow in the process of being dehorned

Dehorning can be performed on older animals and is normally performed with local anesthesia (cornual nerve block) by a veterinarian or a trained professional. Removal of larger horns is usually performed during spring and autumn to avoid fly season. Sedation may be recommended, especially for larger animals that require increased restraint. Use of longer-term pain medicine, like nonsteroidal anti-inflammatory drugs, is being researched in the US to ensure food safety.

For mature cattle that were not dehorned when they were young, another common practice is to cut off only the pointed end of the horn. This practice is called horn tipping; it is less stressful on the animal because there is no blood loss and the horn is cut off where there are no longer any nerve endings. This practice does not eliminate the bruising damage done by the horns when cows fight, but it does eliminate the risk of puncture wounds and eye loss from pointed horns.

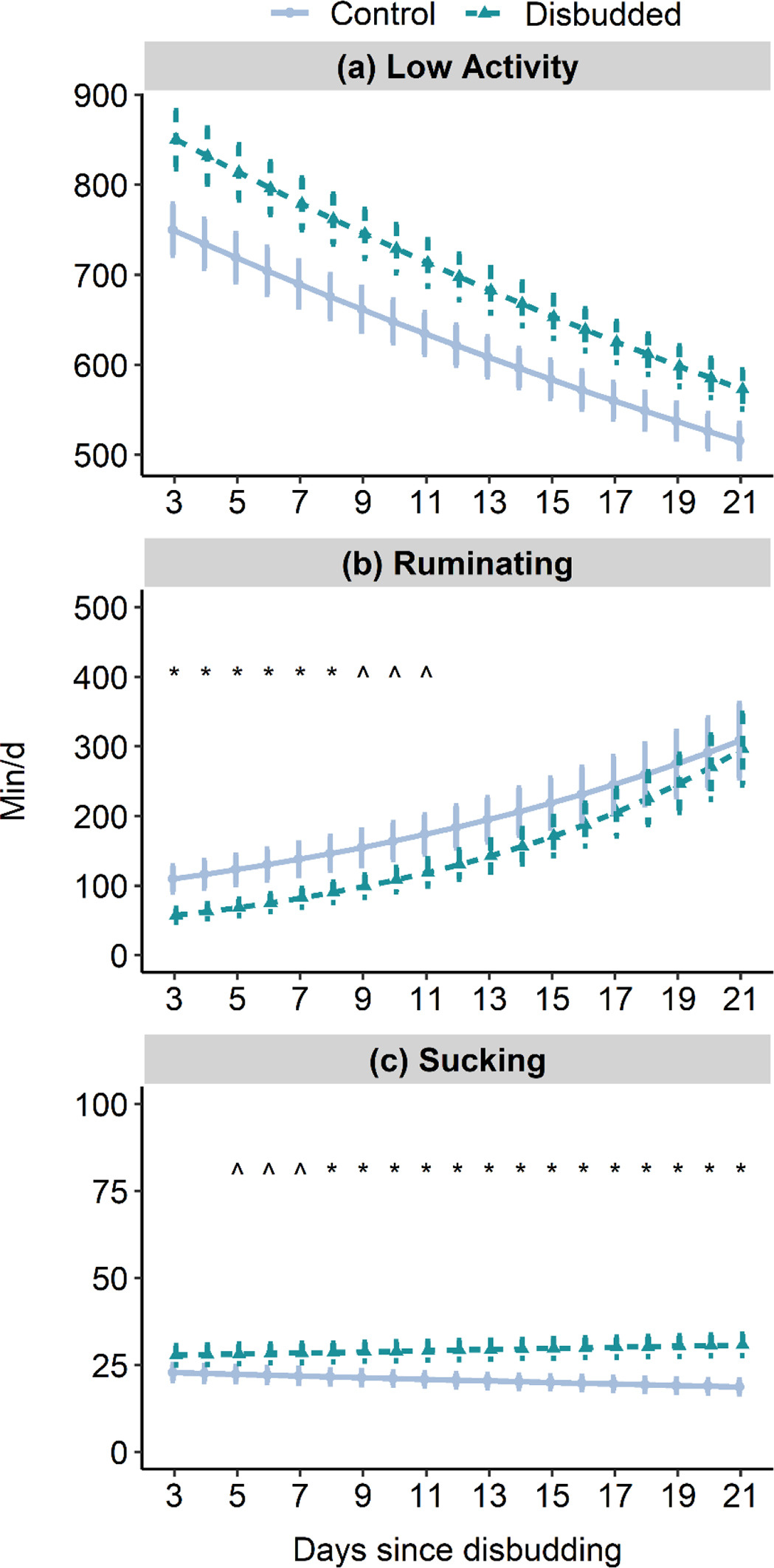
While disbudding is intended to minimize discomfort, there is evidence that the calves experience elevated distress for at least three weeks after the procedure.

Disbudding minimizes discomfort and risk, and is performed when horns are small "buds" by one of several methods:

- Cauterization is the process of killing the growth ring of the horn using heat. This process is done when cattle are very young, no more than three or four weeks old—that way the horns are not very big. The earlier in the calf's life cauterization is done, the less pain and stress is inflicted on the calf. Cauterization is usually done with a dehorning hot iron after the area is numbed with local anesthesia.
- A curved knife can be used to cut the horn off when the calf is younger than a couple of months old. It is a simple procedure where the horn and the growth ring is cut off to remove the horn.
- For under eight months of age, but after the horns are starting to grow attached to the skull, a cup dehorner or Gigli saw (a type of surgical cutting wire) is used. There are several different types of cup dehorners, but they all serve the same function of removing the horn and growth ring. Since the horn is tougher it takes more force to remove it so tools that provide some leverage are need. Gigli saw wire is used on horns of older calf's horns that have grown too large for the cup dehorners.
- The most recent development in dehorning technology is use of a caustic dehorning paste. The paste is used on calves at less than two days old. The hair around the horn is trimmed back and then the paste is spread all over the horn bud and around the base of the horn on the growth cells. The paste kills the growth ring of the horn and then the horn falls off like a scab when it is healed. However, this method bears a risk of the paste causing injury to the animal's eyes or other tissues if used during periods of rain.

At the same time, research shows that calves who have been disbudded stay less active and suckle more often than the intact controls for at least three weeks after the procedure. This is likely due to their attempts to avoid disturbing partially healed wounds and to relieve discomfort, respectively. It suggests that painkiller medication may need to be administered for a much longer period after the procedure, rather than just right before it.

If a disbudding is performed poorly, "scurs" may grow, misshapen stub horns that are generally more dangerous than regular horns if allowed to grow. These generally require monitoring and another round of cauterization if detected early, or dehorning if not detected rapidly.

=== Restraint methods ===
The animal to be dehorned is usually restrained, often with a dehorning table, or sedated. This ensures that the dehorning procedure can be done safely and properly. Young calves are run through a head gate (similar to a cattle crush) or haltered. Calves more than a few months old are held in a head gate and their head restrained with a dehorning table or chin bar. Smaller animals like sheep and goats may be restrained by hand or with use of halters.

=== Pain control ===
In 2007, the U.S. Department of Agriculture's (USDA) National Animal Health Monitoring System (NAHMS) survey suggested that most cattle in the U.S. were disbudded or dehorned without the use of anesthesia at that time. The survey showed that more than nine out of ten dairy farms practiced dehorning, but fewer than 20 percent of cattle dairy operations used analgesics or anesthesia during the process. While animal rights groups, like the Humane Society of the United States, condemn the practice of dehorning, ending it would mean increased horn-related injuries to cattle and humans. Polled genetics, long a staple in beef cattle breeding are becoming more popular among dairy farmers, with more polled calves being born to dairy cattle every year. Genetic testing can now determine if cattle carry genes for growing horns.

A 2011 study indicated that only 10% of dairy cattle farmers in Europe followed recommend dehorning guidelines.

== Public debate ==
A referendum held in 2018 in Switzerland was on providing additional subsidies to farmers that did not dehorn their livestock; 75–90% of livestock in Switzerland had their horns removed. The referendum was a result of farmer Armin Capaul collecting over 100,000 signatures for a vote on the issue. However, the proposal was opposed by the government and rejected by voters, and did not pass.

== See also ==
- Overview of discretionary invasive procedures on animals
