= Lynda Stoner =

Australian animal rights activist and former actress

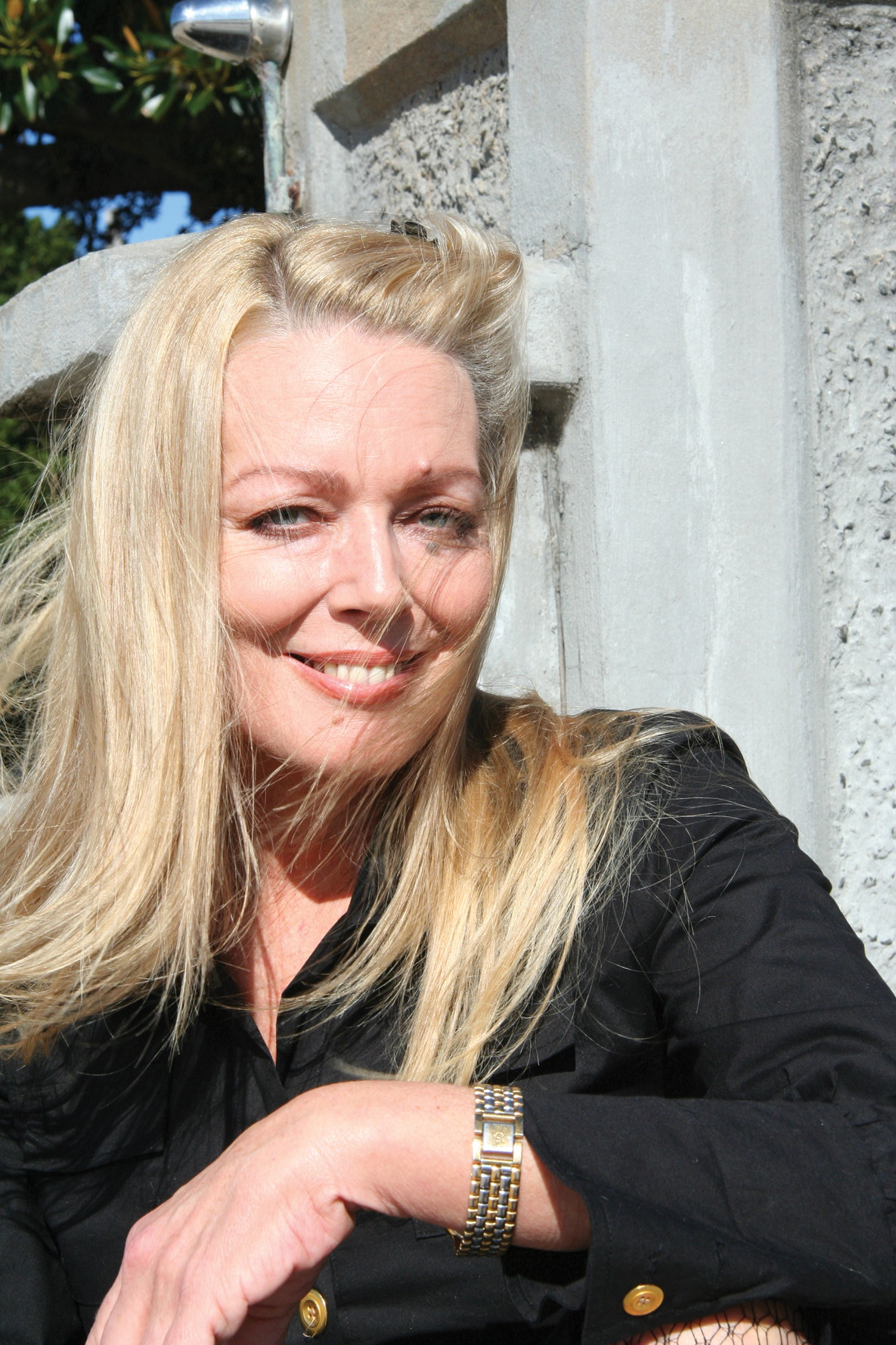
- Stoner in 2009
- Born: 10 September 1953 (age 73); Australia
- Occupations: Actress (former), animal rights activist
- Years active: 1977-2000 (as actress)
- Known for: The Young Doctors (TV series) as Kim Barrington; Cop Shop (TV series) as Amanda King; Prisoner (TV series) as Eve Wilder
- Spouse: Peter Sumner (m. 1982; died 2016)
- Partner: Derryn Hinch (1979–1982)
- Children: 1

Lynda Stoner (born 10 September 1953) is an Australian former actress, most notable for her roles on the small screen on television soap operas and serials is an animal rights activist. She is the chief executive of Animal Liberation, an animal rights charity.

Stoner was an Animal Justice Party candidate for the Senate representing New South Wales at the 2016 federal election.

== Career ==
In the late 1970s and early 1980s, Stoner was known for several roles on Australian television and was popularly regarded as a sex symbol. She appeared in The Paul Hogan Show, then had leading regular roles in the soap opera The Young Doctors from 1977 to 1979 as Kim Barrington in 303 episodes and followed this with the police drama Cop Shop as Amanda King

In 1985 she played the glamorous villain Eve Wilder in the cult soap opera Prisoner and her character was spectacularly lynched during the infamous episode 600 riot, screened in 1986. This was followed by a guest role in the raunchy drama serial Chances in 1991 where she played a sex therapist and a guest role in series Home and Away

Stoner worked in theatre, predominantly on stage in productions including Don's Party, Rumors, Are You Lonesome Tonight, and Emerald City. One of her cinema roles is the 1982 exploitation film Turkey Shoot, made during a break from Cop Shop.

In 2011 she appeared in the Australian suspense-thriller film Crawl.

== Animal rights activist ==
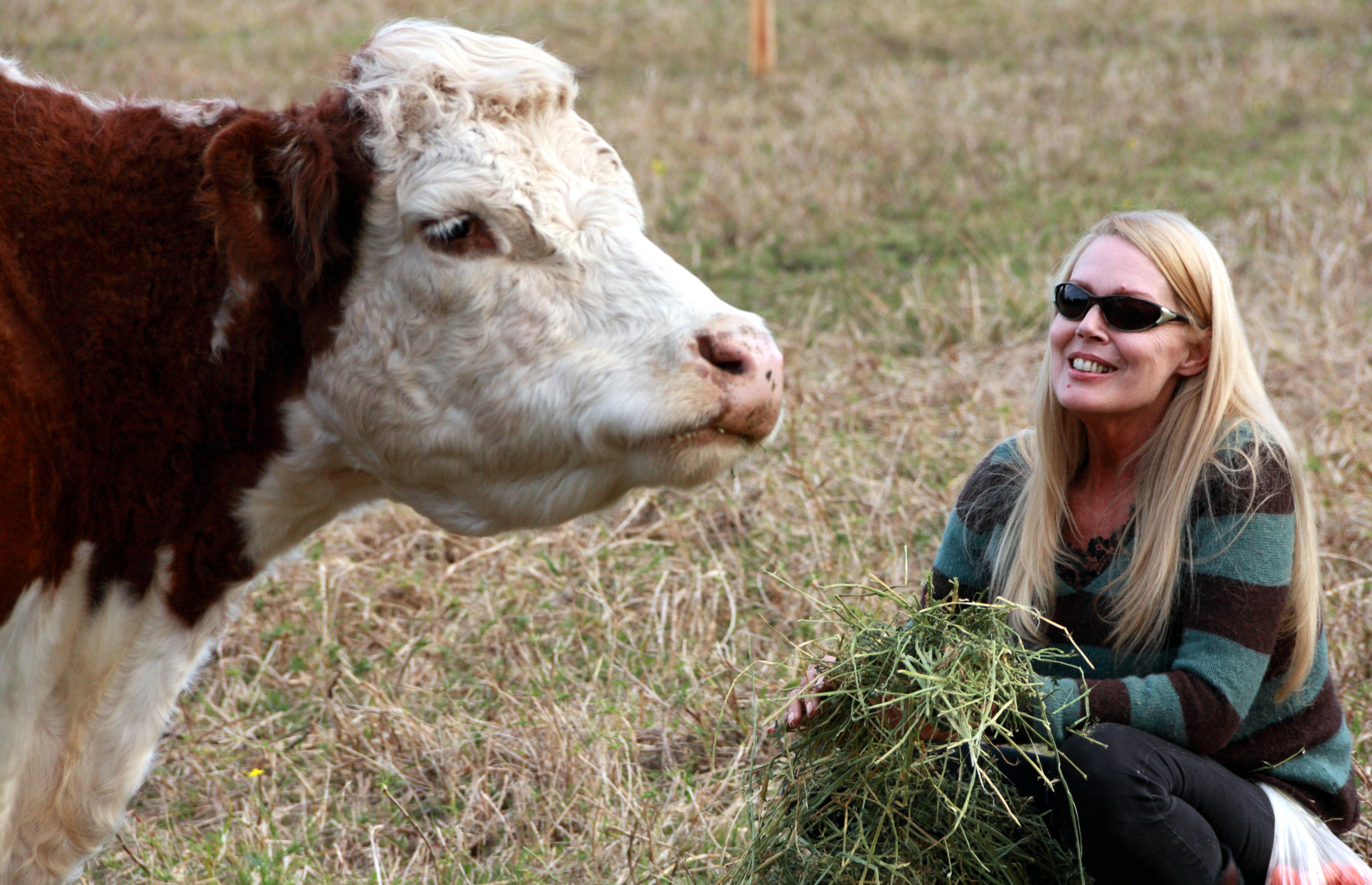
Stoner with Minty

Stoner became a prominent spokesperson for animal rights issues in the early 1980s. She currently holds the position of Chief Executive, Animal Liberation NSW. In May 2013, Stoner compared hunting photos to images of child pornography, bestiality, snuff murders, rape and torture.

Stoner is a vegan and in 2008 authored a vegan cookbook.

== Personal life ==
Stoner was married to actor Peter Sumner on 30 December 1982 until his death in 2016. They have a son, Luke (b. April 1984). She was once engaged to media personality, and former senator Derryn Hinch.

== Filmography ==
=== Film ===
Year	Title	Role	Type
1982	Turkey Shoot	Rita Daniels	Feature film
1987	Shadows of the Peacock (aka Echoes of Paradise)	Beth Mason	Feature film
2008	Not Quite Hollywood: The Wild, Untold Story of Ozploitation!	Herself	Feature film documentary
2011	Crawl	Eileen	Feature film

=== Television ===
Year	Title	Role	Type
1977	Hotel Story		1 episode
1977−1979	The Young Doctors	Kim Barrington	Seasons 2−4, 303 episodes
1979−1984	Cop Shop	Const. Amanda King	Seasons 3−8, 384 episodes
1985−1986	Prisoner	Eve Wilder	Seasons 7−8, 27 episodes
1986	Butterfly Island	:	1 episode
1986	Shark's Paradise	Mrs. Axlemere	TV movie
1987	Eye on L.A.	Herself	TV pilot
1988	The Flying Doctors	Marcia Dean	Season 3, 1 episode)
1989	G.P.		1 episode
1989	Inside Running		1 episode
1991	Chances	Dee Dee Nelson	Season 1, 112 episodes
1991	All Together Now	Gloria Locket	Season 1, 1 episode
1992	Cluedo	Gloria Chase	Season 2, 1 episode
2000	Home And Away	Rhonda Davies	Season 13, 2 episodes

== Theatre ==
Year	Title	Role	Notes
1970	Cry for the Moon		Q Theatre, Adelaide
1971	The Dinkum Bambino		Q Theatre, Adelaide
1971	The World of Suzie Wong	Assistant Stage Manager	Cottage Theatre, Adelaide
1986; 1987	Are You Lonesome Tonight?	Red	Her Majesty's Theatre, Sydney, Festival Theatre, Adelaide
1987	Equus	Hesther Salomon	Glen St Theatre, Sydney
1988	Don's Party		Sydney Opera House, Melbourne Athenaeum
1990	Rumors	Cassie Cooper	Comedy Theatre, Melbourne
2003	Extremities		The Edge Theatre, Sydney
