= Emma Hurst =

Australian politician

The Honourable Emma Hurst MLC

Member of the New South Wales Legislative Council
- Incumbent
- Assumed office 23 March 2019

Personal details
- Born: 25 March 1981 (age 45) Sydney, New South Wales, Australia
- Party: Animal Justice Party
- Education: Monash University
- Profession: Psychologist
- Website: https://www.emmahurstmp.com/

Emma Christine Hurst (born 25 March 1981) is an Australian politician, psychologist and vegan bodybuilder. She was elected to the New South Wales Legislative Council representing the Animal Justice Party at the 2019 state election.

Hurst became involved in animal welfare in 2002, and worked as a media officer for PETA and campaign officer for Animal Liberation. She contested the seat of Grayndler for the Animal Justice Party at the 2016 Australian federal election, and became a member of the NSW Legislative Council following the 2019 NSW state election.

== Early years and background ==
Born and raised in Sydney, Hurst became an animal activist during childhood.

Hurst graduated from Monash University and is a registered psychologist.

=== Animal campaigning ===
Hurst has run a campaign that saw two major duck producers successfully prosecuted by the ACCC, the end of various cruel wild goat racing events, multiple companies including major burger chains and butchers cease their sales of rabbit meat, and hundreds of animals released from medical research.

=== Vegan bodybuilding ===
Hurst became a vegan bodybuilder at age 37. Despite being told she was "too old to compete" and "it would be too hard to go into a bodybuilding competition as a vegan", Hurst took home three gold medals at Australian Natural Bodybuilding bikini competitions. Following her success she continues to advocate for a healthy plant-based lifestyle, competing in numerous half marathons.

== Political career ==
In 2019, Hurst became the second member of the Animal Justice Party elected to the NSW Legislative Council.

Soon after her election she established and chaired a NSW Parliamentary Inquiry into the Use of Battery Cages for Hens in the Egg Production Industry. The Inquiry recommended that all food products containing eggs from caged hens should be clearly labelled for the benefit of consumers, and a phase-out of battery cage hen farming in NSW.

On 26 September 2019, Hurst established a second Inquiry into the exhibition of exotic animals in circuses and exhibition of cetaceans in NSW, where she served as Deputy Chair.

Hurst has been a frequent opponent of Australian ag-gag laws, speaking out against the NSW Government's Right to Farm Bill and increased biosecurity legislation. She has campaigned for increased transparency in the Australian animal agriculture industry.

== See also ==
- List of vegans
