= Humane Society International Australia =

Humane World for Animals Australia
- Founded: 1994
- Type: Charity
- Purpose: Conservation, Animal Welfare and Biodiversity
- Location: Sydney, Australia
- Method: Lobbying and Research
- Members: 13
- Website: hsi.org.au

Humane World for Animals Australia (formerly "Humane Society International Australia") is the Australian branch of the international animal protection organisation Humane World for Animals (HWA), (formerly "The Humane Society of the United States").

== History ==
Humane World for Animals (formerly "The Humane Society of the United States") was established in the United States in 1991. The Australian branch of Humane World was the second Humane World office to open under the emerging global program, in 1994. The office, located in Sydney, has been operating for two decades under the direction of Verna Simpson and Michael Kennedy. Humane World Australia works on national and international conservation and animal protection policy and law, with a special responsibility to reach out to its regional neighbors.

At its 1994 inception, the Australian program ran on a budget of less than A$50,000. A few years later, Humane World Australia became a regional non-governmental organization with a team of staff & consultants, members across the country, and a budget of $2.5 million. Humane World Australia also supports activities internationally.

== Rationale ==
Humane World Australia's vision is consistent with the founding vision of Humane World: to change the way people interact with animals and their environments through education and advocacy. The organisation works to protect animals through the development of more ecologically sustainable and humane practices. It runs numerous conservation and animal protection campaigns that cover a broad range in both marine and terrestrial areas.

Humane World Australia also assists the campaigns of international branches of Humane World, such as the anti-Canadian seal hunt and the anti-wildlife trade campaigns. The organisation supports grants and programs across Asia and Africa.

== Campaigns and areas of focus ==
=== Farm animal welfare ===
The organisation is opposed to the export of live animals from Australia, and believes that the frozen meat market is a readily available and ethical option for the industry. Factory farming is a particular focus, as HSI Australia believes that factory farming practices cause unnecessary suffering. The organisation works with the Australian Competition & Consumer Commission regarding legislation for pork and poultry, which includes their truthful labeling campaign. Humane Choice - True Free Range, is an accreditation program in which farms can become accredited to Humane Choice standards and be recognised as a 'True Free Range' producer.

=== Animal testing ===
Alongside Humane Research Australia, Humane World Australia helped pass the End Cruel Cosmetics Bill, which was introduced by Australian Greens senator Lee Rhiannon. Through the Bill, HSI Australia seeks to achieve a national testing and sales ban in Australia and New Zealand.

=== Marine campaigns ===
Humane World Australia publicly criticizes Japanese whaling and the Western Australian shark cull. The organisation is a member of the Antarctic Ocean Alliance.

Humane World Australia's initial legal action against Japan's scientific whaling led to an International Court of Justice (ICJ) case, which ruled in March 2014 that Japan's plan lacked scientific merit. Following the announcement of Japan's "Newrep-A" plan, scheduled to commence in December 2015, senior program officer Alexia Wellbelove stated: "It is now time that Japan listened to international public opinion and consigned their so-called research program and plans to resume commercial whaling to history where it belongs."

Humane World Australia is against the use of lethal shark control measures within Australia, and has spoken out about the lack of scientific evidence behind the use of such practices as a mitigation strategy. Humane World Australia also campaigned alongside its international counterparts to ban the Canadian seal hunt, and is pushing for an end to the trade.

=== Racing ===
Humane World Australia has taken a critical stance on horse racing, specifically steeplechase, due to the horse deaths and injuries that occur. Humane World Australia is campaigning towards its ban in all states.

The group also campaigns against Australian Greyhound racing, with a focus placed upon the New South Wales (NSW) sector of the industry. Humane World Australia seeks greater transparency in the industry, including stricter welfare standards, and better reporting and investigation of cruelty and mistreatment.

=== Fur trade ===
Humane World Australia works alongside Humane World, HW Canada and HW United Kingdom (UK) to highlight the practices of the global fur industry. Within Australia, Humane World Australia successfully lobbied for a ban on the import of cat and dog fur, and praises designers and retailers who participate in the ban on fur.

The dog meat trade is an ongoing campaign that Humane World is working on with its partners, including the Soi Dog Foundation.

=== Threatened ecological communities ===
Humane World Australia is committed to long term conservation initiatives, and nominates ecological communities under threat for listing under both the Commonwealth Environment Protection and Biodiversity Conservation Act, 1999 (EPBC Act) and the New South Wales Threatened Species Conservation Act, 1995 (TSC Act).

=== Climate change ===
Humane World Australia aims to combat climate change through the protection of biodiversity.

=== Wildlife trade ===
Through representation at international conferences such as CITES, Humane World Australia works to combat the global trade in wildlife.

== Wildlife Land Trust ==
In 2007, Humane World launched the Wildlife Land Trust Australia (WLT). The principle of WLT is "humane stewardship" for the purpose of developing a network of permanent sanctuaries throughout the country as well as internationally.

== Humane Choice ==
Humane Choice was launched by Humane World Australia in 2006. It is a certification scheme that indicates the humane treatment of farm animals.

== Places You Love Alliance ==
Humane World Australia is a member of the Places You Love Alliance, a campaign which includes other not-for-profit environmental advocacy groups, such as The Wilderness Society and the International Fund for Animal Welfare Australia.

== Publications ==
Humane World Australia produces numerous publications:

- "Newsletter" - for supporters, featuring project updates and news.
- "Extinction Denied Technical Bulletin" - reporting on domestic and international projects, targeted towards scientific peers.
- "Campaign Report" - annual campaign reports summarizing HSI Australia's yearly activities.
- "Wildlife Lands" - newsletter of WLT.

== See also ==
- Animal welfare and rights in Australia

== Bibliography ==
Menkhorst, Peter; Knight, Frank (2010). A Field Guide to the Mammals of Australia. Australia: Oxford University Press Australia. p. 296. ISBN 9780195573954.
