= Animal Liberation Queensland =

Australian animal rights organisation

- Founded: 1979
- Purpose: Animal rights, Veganism
- Location: Brisbane
- Region served: Queensland
- Method: Education, investigation
- Website: www.alq.org.au

Animal Liberation Queensland (ALQ) is an independent not-for-profit animal rights organisation operating in Queensland, Australia. Founded in 1979 by Jacki Batzloff, ALQ advocates for the rights of animals, exposing animal abuse and exploitation. ALQ is a registered charity with the Australian Charities and Not-for-profits Commission (ACNC) and its headquarters are located in Brisbane.

== Vision ==
ALQ's vision is "a world where all nonhuman animals live free from abuse, exploitation, and suffering" and where "speciesist attitudes are rejected by society and veganism is accepted as the norm." The organisation aims to do this by fostering respectful and compassionate community attitudes towards animals, with veganism being promoted as the most ethical and ecologically sustainable lifestyle.

== Campaigns ==
ALQ operates a variety of campaigns to expose animal cruelty and educate the public about animal welfare issues. These campaigns cover vegan outreach, rodeos, the dairy industry, puppy farms, circuses, flying foxes, duck hunting, chicken hatching and greyhound racing.

=== Live baiting in greyhound racing ===
In February 2015, ALQ and Animals Australia exposed live baiting in the greyhound racing industry. The findings of this investigation were aired on Four Corners. The episode, Making a Killing, showed footage of "live piglets, possums and rabbits being fixed to mechanical lures and catapulted around tracks while being chased, and eventually killed, by dogs."

The revelations implicated 70 people, some of whom were prominent figures in the industry, including high-profile trainers, the president of a greyhound racing club and a former steward. The investigation resulted in an end to the self-regulation of the industry in Queensland, along with dozens of animal cruelty prosecutions.

=== Duck hunting ===
In 2005, ALQ was part of an alliance with other wildlife organisations which led a successful campaign to ban duck and quail hunting in Queensland. On 10 August 2005, Queensland committed to ban the shooting of native waterbirds with Peter Beattie, the Premier at the time, stating "this is not an appropriate activity in contemporary life in the smart state." On 1 November 2006, the Government officially passed the law and Queensland became the third state, behind Western Australia in 1990 and New South Wales in 1995, to ban the recreational shooting of native ducks and quail.

== See also ==
- Animal welfare and rights in Australia
