= Sulala Animal Rescue =

Animal shelter in the Gaza Strip

- Formation: 2006; 20 years ago
- Type: Animal welfare organisation
- Legal status: Active
- Key people: Saeed Al-Err (founder); Annelies Keuleers (spokesperson)
- Website: sulalaanimalrescue.com

Sulala Animal Rescue (سلالة), also known as Sulala Society, is an animal shelter in the Gaza Strip founded by Saeed Al-Err in 2006. In addition to operating as a stray animal shelter and vet, the organisation seeks to promote the welfare of animals through education.

== History ==
In the early 2000s, Saeed Al-Err would spend his days feeding stray animals he saw around Gaza. He was horrified to stumble across a Facebook post from a local municipal office encouraging the killing of strays. With help from locals, journalists, and animal rights groups, Al-Err presented a case opposing this to the office and persuaded them to make a u-turn. He borrowed money and sold his car for land to house the animals, and used a combination of his own money and public donations to feed them. He almost closed the operations for financial reasons before being offered support by the Palestinian Authority (PA) as a civil servant. After a nine month dog training course in Russia, in 2006, Al-Err registered Sulala in Gaza City as an official charity to operate as a dog, cat, and donkey shelter, headquartered in Zeitoun.

By 2022, Sulala had opened a second site in North Gaza.

During the Gaza war, Sulala were forced to move and scatter operations multiple times. The cats and disabled dogs were the first to be evacuated south, first to Nuseirat. 19-year-old employee Loay Rami Al-Wadi was killed early on. Having stopped receiving shipments on 9 October, Animals Australia sent a truck of aid to the Rafah crossing on New Year's Eve, but the truck's arrival was hindered by delays. To One Green Planet, Al-Err called his continued efforts to help strays a "shelter for the displaced dogs".

== Operations ==
Sulala is funded and supported by a combinations of donations, aid, and a monthly pension. The organisation feeds stray animals and brings those at risk of violence or in need of medical attention to the shelter, which has a veterinary clinic. Animals are isolated and rehabilitated upon arriving at the shelter before being permitted to mingle. All animals receive the necessary vaccinations, and healthy animals who qualify for it undergo spay neuter.

Volunteers from Sulala visit local nurseries/kindergartens and schools to promote the welfare of animals through education.

Due to the lack of specialised veterinary prosthetic limbs in Gaza, Al-Err and his brother designed and built their own mobility aid for a dog named Lucy using scrap materials from old bicycles and toy cars, providing a basis for the shelters' care of amputees. Sulala has also arranged specialised surgeries for certain animals with clinics abroad.
