= Voiceless (animal rights group) =

Charity in Australia

Voiceless, the animal protection institute
- Founded: 2004
- Founder: Brian Sherman AM, Ondine Sherman
- Purpose: Animal Welfare, Animal Rights
- Location: Sydney
- Region served: Australia
- Method: Education, animal law, research, publications
- Website: www.voiceless.org.au

Voiceless is an independent, non-profit animal protection charity based in Sydney, Australia, whose work is focused on raising awareness of animals suffering in factory farming and the kangaroo industry in Australia.

Voiceless was founded by father-daughter team Brian Sherman AM and Ondine Sherman in 2004 with the goal of making animal protection the next great social justice movement. focussing on animal protection and animal law education. Voiceless has a Scientific Expert Advisory Council, Legal Advisory Council and Education Advisory Council.

== History ==
Voiceless was founded by father-daughter team Brian Sherman AM and Ondine Sherman in 2004. Ondine Sherman first became interested in animal welfare when served a dish of tongue cooked by her grandmother at age 8, an experience which resulted in her adopting a vegetarian lifestyle. After retiring in 2003, Brian Sherman attended an animal rights conference with Ondine in the United States. They were both shocked by the extent of animal suffering in institutionalised farming. After being exposed to a number of animal welfare and animal rights issues, they decided to raise awareness of animal suffering in Australia by established Voiceless. Brian has published a history of Voiceless in his autobiography The Lives of Brian.

== Animal Protection ==
Voiceless identifies itself as an animal protection institute, encompassing animal welfare, and animal rights, in an attempt to unify those two movements.

== Advocacy work (2004–2017) ==
From 2004 to 2017, Voiceless focussed its advocacy work on two areas – factory farming and the commercial kangaroo industry. Ondine Sherman has explained that the reason for this focus is that these issues cause the most suffering to the largest number of Australian animals, yet often receive little attention. Advocacy work included writing law reform submissions, running campaigns, creating research publications and hosting the Voiceless Animal Law Lecture Series, the Voiceless Grants Program and the Voiceless Media Prizes.

=== Factory farming ===
Factory farming is the process of raising livestock in industrial systems in which animals are confined at high stocking density to produce the highest output at the lowest cost. Factory farms remove domesticated farm animals from open pastures, forcing them to live in confined and crowded environments. These close conditions require the use of antibiotics to stop the spread of disease and housing systems often prevent animals from exhibiting many of their natural behaviours. Farm animals are often subjected to artificial feeding and lighting regimes, selective breeding, and intensive confinement, often in cages and at extreme stocking densities, to produce the greatest possible output of meat, milk and eggs in the shortest amount of time at the lowest cost.

According to Voiceless, the intensification of farming processes has resulted in large multinational companies dominating the global meat and dairy trade. As of 2006, 50% of global pork production and over 70% of global chicken production came from industrial systems. Two companies supply approximately 70% of Australia's meat chickens, with the balance of the market supplied by about four medium-sized companies.

Voiceless states that this intensification of agricultural practices has led to the widespread use of cruel and inhumane meat production practices, such as the debeaking of chickens, tail docking and teeth clipping of pigs, and mulesing of sheep, often undertaken without pain relief.

Voiceless's work on factory farming is focused on raising awareness of the practice in order to change the laws which allow it.

=== The commercial kangaroo industry ===
The commercial kangaroo industry is a multimillion-dollar meat and skin industry, responsible for the killing of almost 90 million kangaroos and wallabies in the last 30 years.

Voiceless claims that kangaroos are hunted in the largest commercial slaughter of land-based wildlife on the planet, primarily because they are perceived to be overpopulated in Australia and considered a pest. According to a 2011 report by THINKK, the think tank for kangaroos, the notion of kangaroos as costly pests to Australian farmers has been significantly overstated.

While shooters are required by the relevant Codes of Practice to aim to shoot a kangaroo in the brain and therefore cause instantaneous death, it is Voiceless's view that non-fatal body shots are unavoidable and cause extreme injuries. Voiceless also claims that the death of joeys is ‘collateral damage’ to the killing of female kangaroos, with young joeys killed or left to die when the mother is shot. The kangaroo industry code allows joeys to be killed by a single blow to the head (usually with a steel pipe or against the tow bar of the shooter's truck) or through decapitation. On average, approximately 800,000 dependent joeys are killed as collateral damage of the kangaroo industry.

== See also ==
- Animal welfare and rights in Australia
