= Animal Management in Rural and Remote Indigenous Communities =

Australian animal welfare organisation working with remote Indigenous communities

Animal Management in Rural and Remote Indigenous Communities (AMRRIC) is an Australian organisation that works alongside Aboriginal and Torres Strait Islander peoples to coordinate and facilitate sustainable, culturally-sensitive, professional animal health programs. AMRRIC supports desexing and dog health programs to improve the situation for dogs, their owners and communities. By improving the health and welfare of companion animals, AMRRIC contributes to improved community health.

AMRRIC works with a range of stakeholders and partners. It trains locally employed animal management workers, provides education programs and supports research into disease and disease prevention.

AMRRIC is a non-profit organisation based in Darwin, Northern Territory, operating nationally across Australia. AMRRIC receives funding from the Australian Federal Government's Department of Families, Housing, Community Services and Indigenous Affairs and from the Northern Territory Government, and also relies on private and philanthropic donations.

== Activities ==
AMRRIC is an independent organisation working in all areas of animal management in remote communities, including dog health and welfare, policy, research, education and capacity building. It runs programs which address animal management in a way which is sustainable, culturally sensitive and agreed upon by all parties.

AMRRIC has a range of programs and projects, including:

- Dog health programs which are veterinarian-led desexing programs, including anti-parasite treatment. The program reduces the problems associated with large unmanaged populations of dogs, this includes zoonotic diseases and roaming packs of dogs which show threatening behaviour towards or attacks on humans.
- Animal Management Worker program which provides training, resources and employment to local Indigenous people that enables them to take responsibility for their animals’ health and welfare. Animal Management Workers assist in the running of dog health programs.
- Education programs designed for Indigenous school students, community members, environmental health practitioners, animal management workers and government and non-government organisations about all aspects of animal health and welfare in remote Indigenous communities. Including guidebooks for veterinarians conducting programs on Indigenous communities
- Developing animal health and welfare policy with government partners which is relevant to remote Indigenous communities
- Research programs including the Cancer Genome Project in Cambridge, UK, and its work on Canine Transmissible Venereal Tumour, a common disease in dogs in remote Australian communities.

== Understanding the issues ==
Living conditions in remote Indigenous communities across Australia impact on animal and human health. There are many challenges when managing large dog populations within poorly resourced Indigenous communities. The impact of dog health on the human community is evidenced in the zoonotic diseases passed from animals to humans. In some Indigenous communities in Western Australia gastrointestinal diseases are a major problem in young children. In Western Australia, hospitalisation for gastroenteritis was 7 times higher in Aboriginal children than Non-Aboriginal children.

Dogs have always been part of Indigenous communities in Australia and have many roles including, hunters, companions and guard dogs. Although beliefs about the spiritual significance of dogs vary in from community to community, dogs occupy an important place in culture and the community. It is essential to understand the strong cultural tradition of living with companion animals when developing and delivering animal health and management programs.

== The problem of unmanaged dogs ==
When there are no veterinary services available to a remote community, large unmanaged populations of dogs flourish. These are some of the problem associated with unmanaged dog populations:

- Overpopulation - uncontrolled breeding, unwanted dogs and large numbers of dogs often roaming in packs
- Zoonoses - the transference of disease from animals to humans, these include scabies, giardia, hookworm
- Noise - associated with barking, fighting or mating
- Litter - mess from scavenging such as overturned bins, scraps, faeces, etc.
- Danger and threatening behaviour - "cheeky dogs" biting or attacking children, dogs chasing vehicles
- Loss - dogs stealing food from storage or young children; dogs attacking livestock

== See also ==
- Animal welfare and rights in Australia
