= Christine Townend =

Australian animal rights activist, artist, and author

Christine Townend OAM
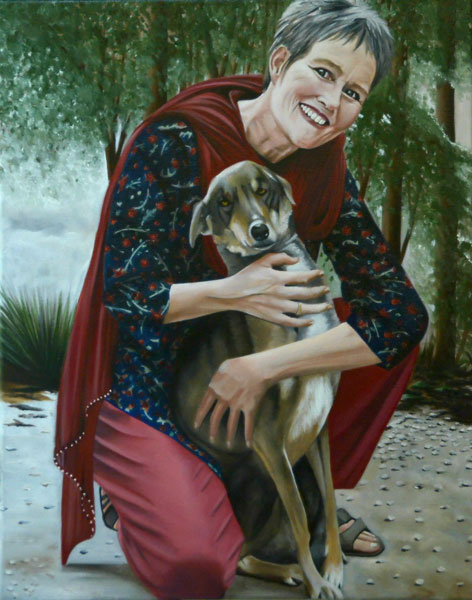
- Portrait of Townend painted by artist Gerlinde Thomas for her 2014 exhibition "On The Face Of It"
- Born: Christine Elizabeth Woolcott; 20 July 1944; Melbourne, Victoria
- Died: 15 August 2025 (aged 81)
- Education: Macquarie University (BA); University of Sydney (DA)
- Occupation: Writer • artist • activist
- Website: workingforanimals.org.au

Christine Elizabeth Townend (20 July 1944 – 15 August 2025) was an Australian animal rights activist, artist, and author.

== Biography ==
Townend was born in Melbourne on 20 July 1944. She grew up in Sydney's lower North Shore. Townend had her first novel published by Macmillan in 1974. It was described as a precursor to Australian feminist literature and has recently been republished on-line by Macmillan Memento. She then received a 6-month fellowship from the Australian Council for the Arts. In 1975 Townend journeyed to India, returning with a commitment to animal rights. She founded Animal Liberation in 1976, having been influenced by Peter Singer's eponymous book; she and Singer co-founded Animals Australia (as the Australian Federation of Animal Societies) in 1980. She joined the Australian Democrats, running for election under their banner four times before joining Milo Dunphy on an "Environment Group" ticket in 1988. At the time she was Secretary of the Australian and New Zealand Federation of Animal Societies, a member of the NSW Animal Welfare Advisory Council and the CSIRO Advisory Committee on the Ethics of Animals in Research. In 1990 she moved to India to run an animal shelter, Help in Suffering in Jaipur, which she managed until 2007. Whilst living at the shelter in Jaipur, she founded two other animal shelters in Kalimpong and Darjeeling.

Townend is also an artist. She has held five solo art exhibitions. She has used her art as a means of drawing attention to the needs and interests of animals.

She founded Working for Animals Inc, an Australian NGO with the purpose of raising funds for animal shelters in India.

In 2017 Townend was appointed Director and Chair of the Animals Australia Board. In January 2019 Townend was awarded an Order of Australia Medal for 'service to animal welfare'.

She died on 15 August 2025.

== Writing ==
She authored books on animal rights, including In Defence of Living Things (1979), A Voice for the Animals (1981) and Pulling the Wool: A New Look at the Australian Wool Industry (1986), and fiction, from her first book, The Beginning of Everything and the End of Everything Else (1974), to more recent explorations of Indian spirituality such as The Hidden Master (2002) and The Teaching of Vimala Thakar (2010). In 2007 her biography Christine’s Ark, written by journalist John Little was published by Macmillan. Moti, An Indian Elephant was published in India in 2014. Townend holds a Doctorate in poetry from the University of Sydney. Her poetry collection, Walking with Elephants was published by Island Press in July 2015. Her memoir, A Life for Animals, was published by Sydney University Press in 2017, with a foreword by Peter Singer.
