= Mark Pearson (Australian politician) =

Australian politician

The Honourable Mark Pearson MLC
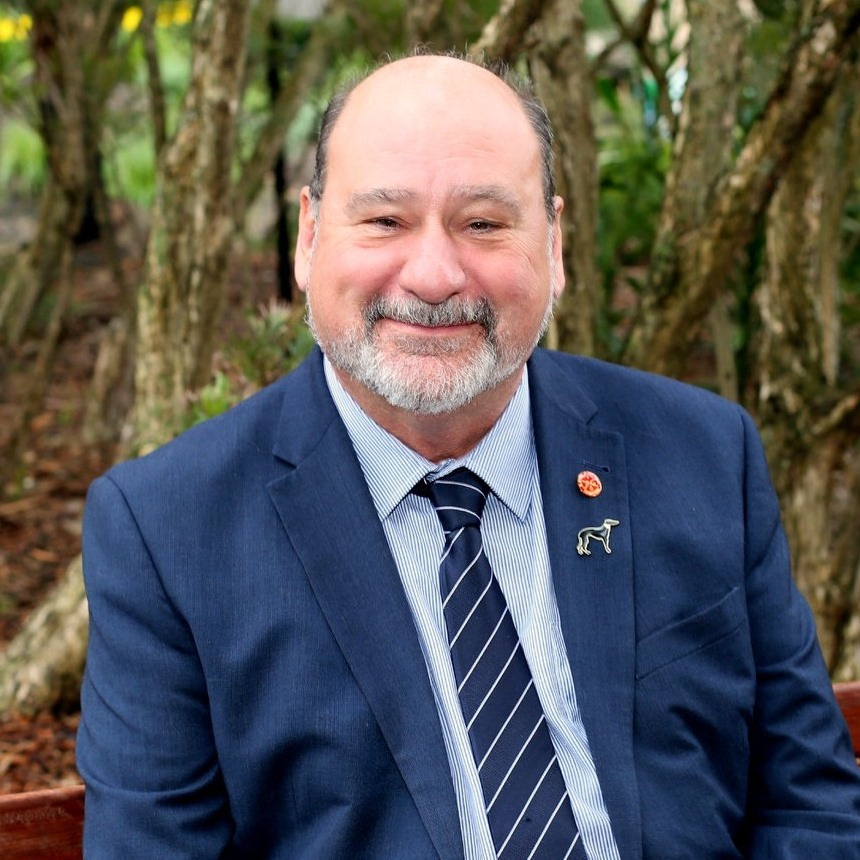

Member of the New South Wales Legislative Council
- In office 28 March 2015 – 3 March 2023

Personal details
- Born: 1959 (age 66–67) Casino, New South Wales, Australia
- Party: Animal Justice Party
- Profession: Psychiatric nurse specialist

Mark Anthony Pearson (born 1959) is an Australian politician. He was a Member of the New South Wales Legislative Council from 2015 until 2023, representing the Animal Justice Party. Prior to his election, Pearson served as the executive director, Animal Liberation based in Sydney.

== Early years and animal rights ==
Pearson trained as a nurse and worked as a Clinical Acute Adult Psychiatric Nurse Specialist and as the Team Leader of the Newcastle Community Mental Health Service in Newcastle.

Pearson then transitioned to working full-time in animal advocacy, activism and campaign work; exposing cruelty in factory farming and recently, lobbying against the kangaroo meat trade. In his position as the executive director of Animal Liberation in Australia his main focus was on farm animals, particularly factory farming. Pearson was involved in advocating for the abolition of mulesing in sheep and convincing the Russian Federation to ban imports of kangaroo meat by exposing cruelty and hygiene problems.

== Political career ==
Mark Pearson became the first Australian Member of Parliament to be elected on an animal justice platform, he was elected to the NSW Legislative Council in March 2015. At the time of his election to Parliament, he was the Secretary of the Animal Justice Party.

Within a year of being elected to parliament, Pearson introduced the Prevention of Cruelty to Animals Amendment (Stock Animals) Bill 2015. The bill sought to protect farm animals from cruelty and included a call for mandatory surveillance cameras in all intensive livestock facilities and abattoirs. The bill also called for mandatory installation of effective alarms and sprinkler systems to protect pigs, chickens and other confined farm animals vulnerable to fire and ventilation breakdowns.

In 2018, Pearson introduced his next bill, calling to ban the use of exotic animals in circuses and citing a shift in public opinion and a global move away from the use of exotic animals in circuses.

Following from his previous work to ban mulesing of Australian sheep, in 2019 Pearson introduced a bill to prohibit mulesing, and to mandate pain relief for certain procedures such as tail docking and castration.

On 8 August 2019, Pearson established and chaired a Committee on Animal Cruelty Laws in New South Wales. Soon after, in October 2019, Mark chaired the inquiry into the effectiveness of animal cruelty laws in New South Wales.

While the Animal Justice Party ran candidates in the 2023 NSW State election, Pearson did not recontest his position.

== Personal life ==
Pearson is one of only a few Australian politicians who were elected to parliament while openly gay.
