= Australian live export industry =

Export of slaughter animals

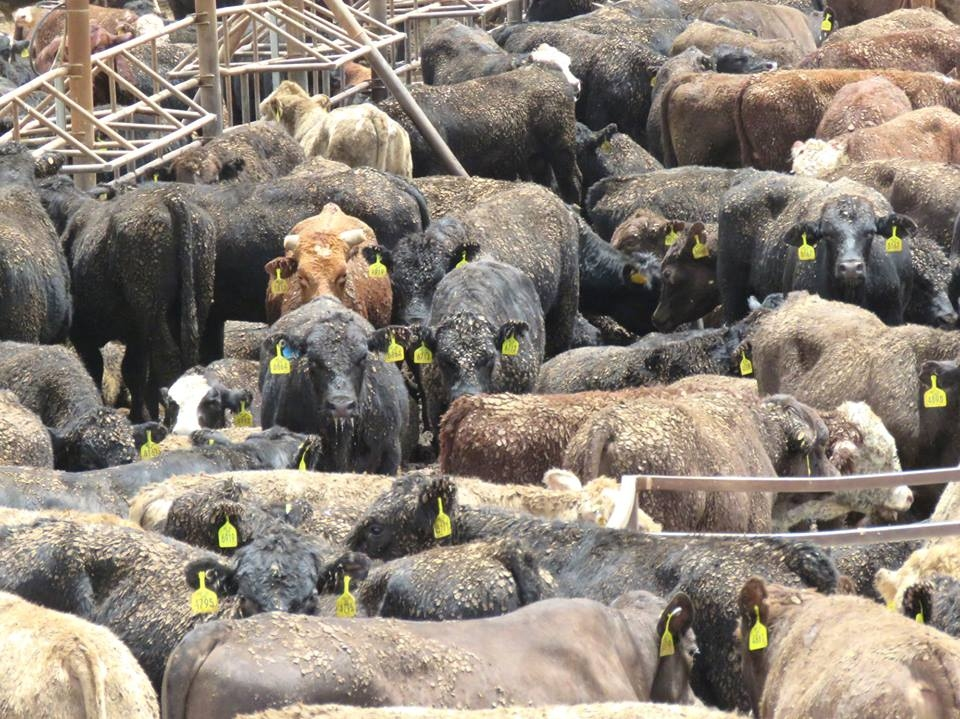
Cattle that have been exported to Israel, 2016

Australia is the world's largest live exporter of animals for slaughter. The trade involved over three million animals in 2011 valued at approximately A$1 billion, of which the majority were cattle and sheep. However, the live export trade only accounts for 0.4% of all Australian exports, as of 2014. Australia exports live cattle, sheep, goats, dairy cows, buffalo, and alpacas.

The export of live animals from Australia has generated some controversy, with animal rights organisations such as Animals Australia asking it to be banned on the grounds that certain countries where animals are shipped have no laws to protect them from cruelty. In 2011, the Gillard government briefly suspended the trade and came close to a ban. Exports have since resumed. The Albanese government is planning to phase out the live sheep trade. Australia will stop exporting live sheep from 1 May 2028. The National Farmers' Federation is opposed to the ban claiming it will damage diplomatic relationships.

The industry is regulated under the Australian Meat and Live-stock Industry Act 1997 and the Export Control (Animals) Order 2004. Since 1985 at least ten government and parliamentary reviews have investigated live exports and its associated animal welfare issues. The first shipments of live sheep were exported from Western Australia to Mauritius and Singapore from 1845.

== Exports ==
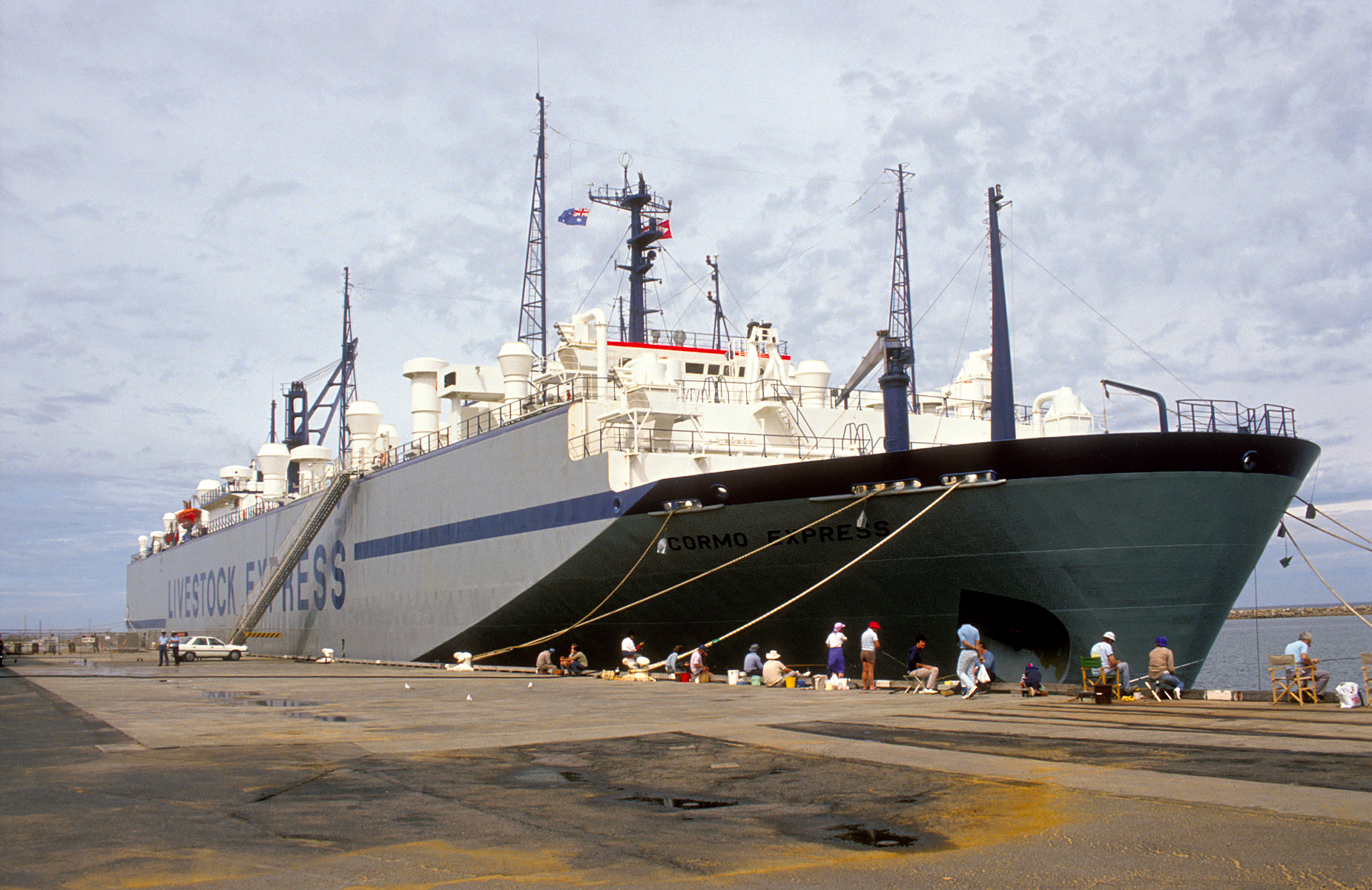
In August 2003, 5,691 sheep died aboard the Cormo Express

Australia exports live animals to many countries, including Indonesia, Egypt, Israel, Turkey, Russia, Lebanon, Jordan, Kuwait, Iran, Bahrain, Qatar, Pakistan, Mauritius, Malaysia, Singapore, Vietnam and China. A number of ships, mostly converted container ships, move animals from Australia to these countries. Saudi Arabia was historically Australia's largest market for sheep, however it stopped the export due to Australia strict export regulations. 575,000 sheep were exported in 2021, down from a figure of two million in 2017. Indonesia is Australia's largest market for live cattle.

Exports leave via ports at Darwin, Broome, Townsville, Portland and Perth (Fremantle). The loading of stock can take several days. Stocking densities allocate 0.38 metres squared per sheep which means they cannot lay down or easily access food and water.

To ensure animal welfare was maintained, observers were supposed to be deployed to all live export ships, though in practice many sailed without them. Observers were introduced in April 2018. They monitor heat stress and animal deaths. Observers produce reports on deaths and conditions that are supposed to be published regularly. This program was wound back in 2019 and then halted during the COVID-19 pandemic. Observers started monitoring again in May 2022.

=== Threats ===
The live export industry is threatened by lumpy skin disease. If the disease was found in Australian livestock all exports of live cattle, meat and dairy would be halted. In 2023, Lumpy skin disease was detected in Indonesia in cattle that originated from Australia. Indonesian authorities removed market access for further livestock imports into Indonesia until Australian authorities proved that the cattle had not been infected in Australia and that the source of the disease was actually in Indonesia.

== Statistics ==
In 2011, the Australian Bureau of Statistics estimated that:

- 2,458,448 sheep were exported from Australia, worth $328 million
- 694,429 cattle were exported, worth $629.4 million
- 63,663 goats were exported, worth $8.5 million

According to the Australian Bureau of Statistics, exports of live sheep rose 21.4% and live calves increased 9.7% between March 2017 and March 2018. During 2017 alone, Australia exported 2.85 million living animals in shipping containers and airplanes.

Live exports of sheep peaked at 7,101,300 in 1988.

Government reporting indicates that 1.289 million livestock were exported in 2023/2024; including 746,829 cattle and 519,531 sheep.

== Animal rights controversy ==
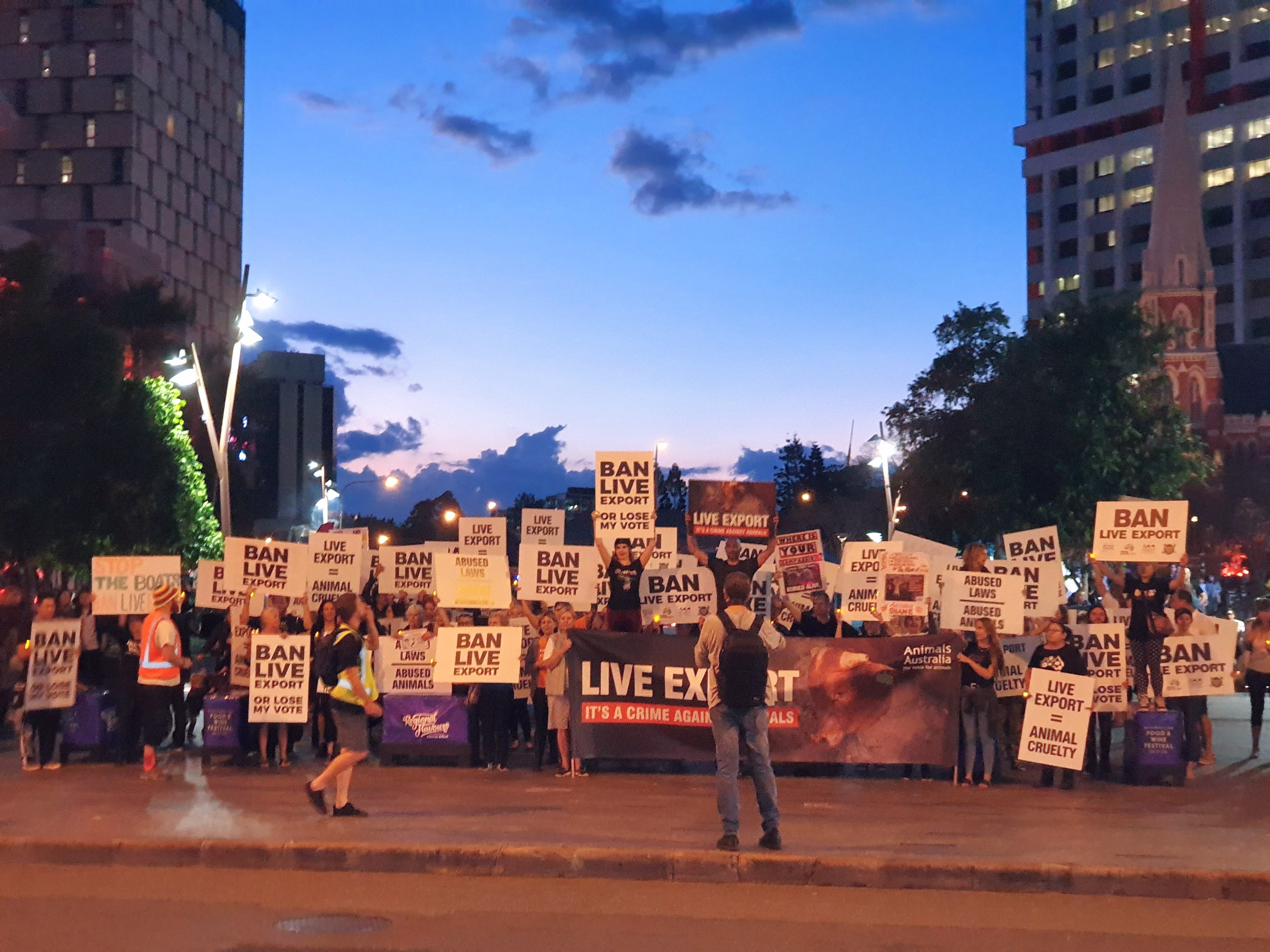
Anti-live export protest in Brisbane, 2019

In March 2011, Animals Australia conducted an investigation of the treatment of exported Australian cattle in Indonesia. The investigation revealed animals had their throats cut while fully conscious and remained conscious for more than 30 seconds after the initial throat cut. This sparked mass protests across Australia calling for the live export trade to be banned. RSPCA Australia supported a ban.

The sudden decision taking immediate effect by then Agriculture Minister Joe Ludwig in May 2011 to ban live animal exports in response to the negative media coverage resulted in significant disruption to the livestock supply chain across northern Australia. In July 2017, a group of cattle farmers sued the Australian Government for $600 million in compensation, arguing that the decision to suspend live cattle exports was "irrational, disproportionate and unjustified". In June 2020, a Federal Court ruled in favour of the group of cattle farmers. In delivering his judgement, Justice Rares said the ban order was "capricious" and "unreasonable."

In September 2012, 20,000 sheep were killed when a shipload of animals, rejected by Bahrain due to disease claims were offloaded into Pakistan. The mass slaughter was featured in a Four Corners program called "Another Bloody Business".

In April 2018, Australian current affairs program, 60 Minutes, revealed the suffering of sheep on Australian live export ships in an exposé called "Sheep, Ships and Videotape." For years, exporters had assured the Australian public the safety and well-being of the sheep was their priority. Because cameras were not allowed on board, this was taken as true — until a Pakistani crew-member turned whistleblower documented the daily horrors onboard export ships, of sheep dehydrating, being crushed and even cooking alive during voyages to the Middle Eastern summer. The evidence of routine, extreme animal cruelty was so horrific that Federal Minister for Agriculture, David Littleproud, called "bullshit" and described how the footage left him "shocked and gutted". A range of reforms to live exports emerged after outrage was generated by the report. One reform was the establishment of an Inspector-General of Live Animal Exports to oversee regulation from the Department of Agriculture and Water Resources.

The move to ban live sheep exports in 2028 was welcomed by animal rights groups.

== See also ==
- Agriculture in Australia
- Animal welfare and rights in Australia
