= Animal Justice Party =

Political party in Australia

- Abbreviation: AJP
- President: Bruce Poon
- Founder: Steve Garlick
- Founded: 2009; 17 years ago
- Headquarters: Sydney
- Youth wing: Young AJP
- Ideology: Animal welfare; Vegan politics
- Colours: Purple; Black; Red; White
- NSW Legislative Council: 1 / 42
- Victorian Legislative Council: 1 / 40
- Western Australian Legislative Council: 1 / 37

Website
- www.animaljusticeparty.org

The Animal Justice Party (AJP) is a political party in Australia founded in 2009 by Steve Garlick. The party was registered by the Australian Electoral Commission (AEC) on 3 May 2011. The party is also registered in New South Wales, Queensland, South Australia, Victoria, Western Australia, Tasmania, Northern Territory, and the Australian Capital Territory. The AJP is the first political party in Australia formed solely to advance animal welfare issues.

== Policies and philosophy ==
The preamble of the AJP charter says the party "has been formed as a response to growing public concern about the neglect of animals and animal protection issues by political parties" and states its mission is to "secure the interests of animals and nature through Australia’s democratic institutions of government". The AJP's vision is a "planet on which animals and nature have the right to live and thrive free from negative human interference and a human society which functions with kindness and compassion within its ecological limits as a responsible member of the Earth community." The ideology of the party has five guiding principles:

1. "Each animal is the experiencing subject of a life. Animals and the natural environment should be respected for their own sake, not merely for their instrumental values."
2. "Animals have their own capabilities which they should be free to realise."
3. "Human interactions with all animals should be based on respect and compassion."
4. "Humans have the responsibility to avoid harm to animals and the environment through their lifestyles, diets and practices."
5. "Policies of other political parties, both nationally and internationally, that advance Animal Justice Party principles will be supported."

It has 62 published policies under the categories "Animals", "Planet" and "People". The party aims to give animals constitutional protection based on their sentience, as opposed to their instrumental value. The AJP opposes the export of any live animals for profit, especially slaughter. The AJP aims to legally recognise the inherent Rights of Nature. The party also opposes the eating of meat, and advocates a plant-based diet. Additionally, the AJP has 'positions' which are stances on human social issues that do not affect animals and which the AJP says flow clearly from its core values: Kindness, Equality, Rationality and Non-violence.

The party advocates for the abolition of factory farming, greyhound racing and the live export trade. The party also advocates for the termination of government funding for all animal product industries and for the advertising of animal products to be banned.

== History ==
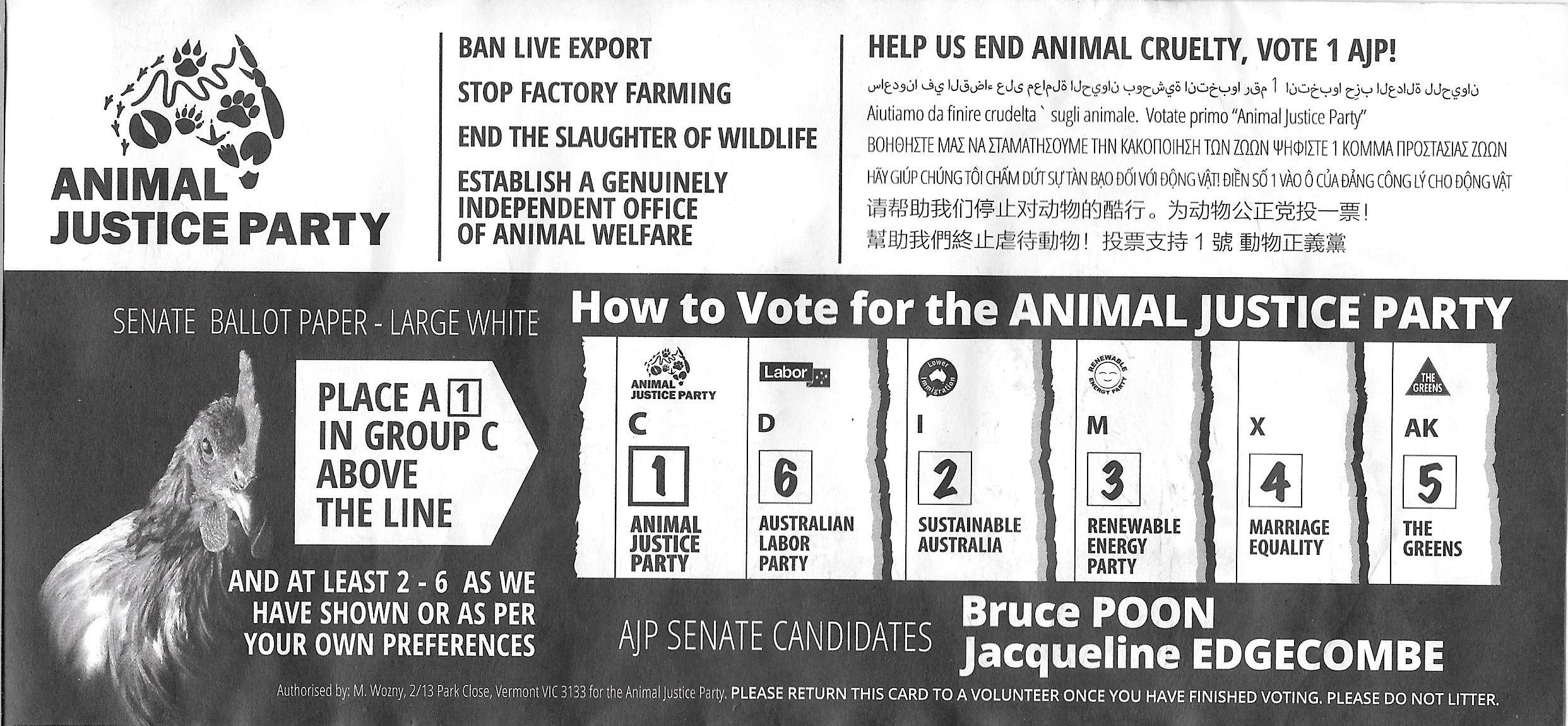

In 2011, following the Australian Broadcasting Corporation's television footage showing abuse and the slaughter of cattle from the Northern Territory in conditions that would not have been permitted in Australia, as well as the consequential nationwide protests by supporters of animal welfare, AJP, along with Animals Australia, the Australasian Meat Industry Employees Union (AMIEU), The Greens and a range of other NGOs sought a ban on live animal exports. Banning live animal exports remains a core commitment on the AJP's election platform.

At the 2015 New South Wales election, Mark Pearson gained 1.8% of the primary vote and won a seat in the New South Wales Legislative Council, giving the party its first parliamentary representation. At the 2019 New South Wales election the AJP increased its primary vote to 1.95% of the state total and winning a second seat filled by Emma Hurst MLC.

The AJP won its first seat in the Victorian Legislative Council at the 2018 Victorian election elected Andy Meddick MLC. The AJP's second-ever Member of the Victorian Parliament, Georgie Purcell, was elected in 2022. The party also increased its primary vote over that of the 2014 Victorian election. Bruce Poon stood at the 2018 by-election for Lord Mayor of Melbourne achieving 1.63% of the vote. In 2020, the party's first ever local government representatives were elected: Charlie Vincent in the Alpine Shire and Julie Sloan in the City of Greater Bendigo.

== Composition ==
A 2021 qualitative study into the AJP interviewed members about the role of women in the party. The researcher found that more than 70% of AJP members are women, far higher than other Australian political parties, and that "men [in the party] have a heightened awareness of any gender gap in leadership." Other findings included: greater opportunities for women to run for elected office, that women seize leadership opportunities, and that the gender of candidates mirrors the gender composition of the membership.

== Electoral results ==
=== New South Wales ===
Legislative Council
Election year	# of overall votes	% of overall vote	# of seats won	# of overall seats	+/–	Notes
2015	76,819	1.8%	1 / 21	1 / 42	▲1	
2019	86,713	1.95%	1 / 21	2 / 42	▲1	
2023	101,183	2.19%	0 / 21	1 / 42	▼1	

=== Victoria ===
Legislative Council
Election year	# of overall votes	% of overall vote	# of seats won	+/–	Notes
2014	58,133	1.70%	0 / 40	0	
2018	88,520	2.47%	1 / 40	▲1	
2022	56,819	1.45%	1 / 40	0	

=== Western Australia ===
Legislative Council
Election year	# of overall votes	% of overall vote	# of seats won	+/–	Notes
2025	18,803	1.21%	1 / 37	▲1	

== Elected representatives ==
=== Current ===
==== New South Wales Legislative Council ====
- Emma Hurst (2019–present)

==== Victorian Legislative Council ====
- Georgie Purcell (2022–present)

==== Western Australian Legislative Council ====
- Amanda Dorn (2025–present)

=== Former ===
==== New South Wales Legislative Council ====
- Mark Pearson (2015–2023)

==== Victorian Legislative Council ====
- Andy Meddick (2018–2022)

==== Alpine Shire Council ====
- Charlie Vincent (2020–2021)

== Controversies ==
In 2017, Animal Justice Party MP Mark Pearson was allegedly found to have eaten seafood at a Japanese restaurant located in Sydney. Pearson acknowledged that whilst he eats an "almost vegan" diet, he "strayed for that morsel [of fish]". This incident resulted in backlash from the vegan community of Sydney, particularly on their Facebook pages, where they accused Pearson of being a "traitor" and a "hypocrite". In response, Pearson asserted that "the main constituents of the party are not vegans or vegetarians" and that "We did not get elected by the vegan community." Since then, the AJP has introduced rules that leaders and candidates representing the party must be vegan. Notable vegan candidates include Chris Delforce, director of the documentary Dominion, and James Aspey.

== See also ==
- Cultured meat
- List of animal advocacy parties
- List of political parties in Australia
- Veganism
- Vegetarianism
