= Beak trimming =

Trimming of a bird's beak, usually performed on domesticated birds

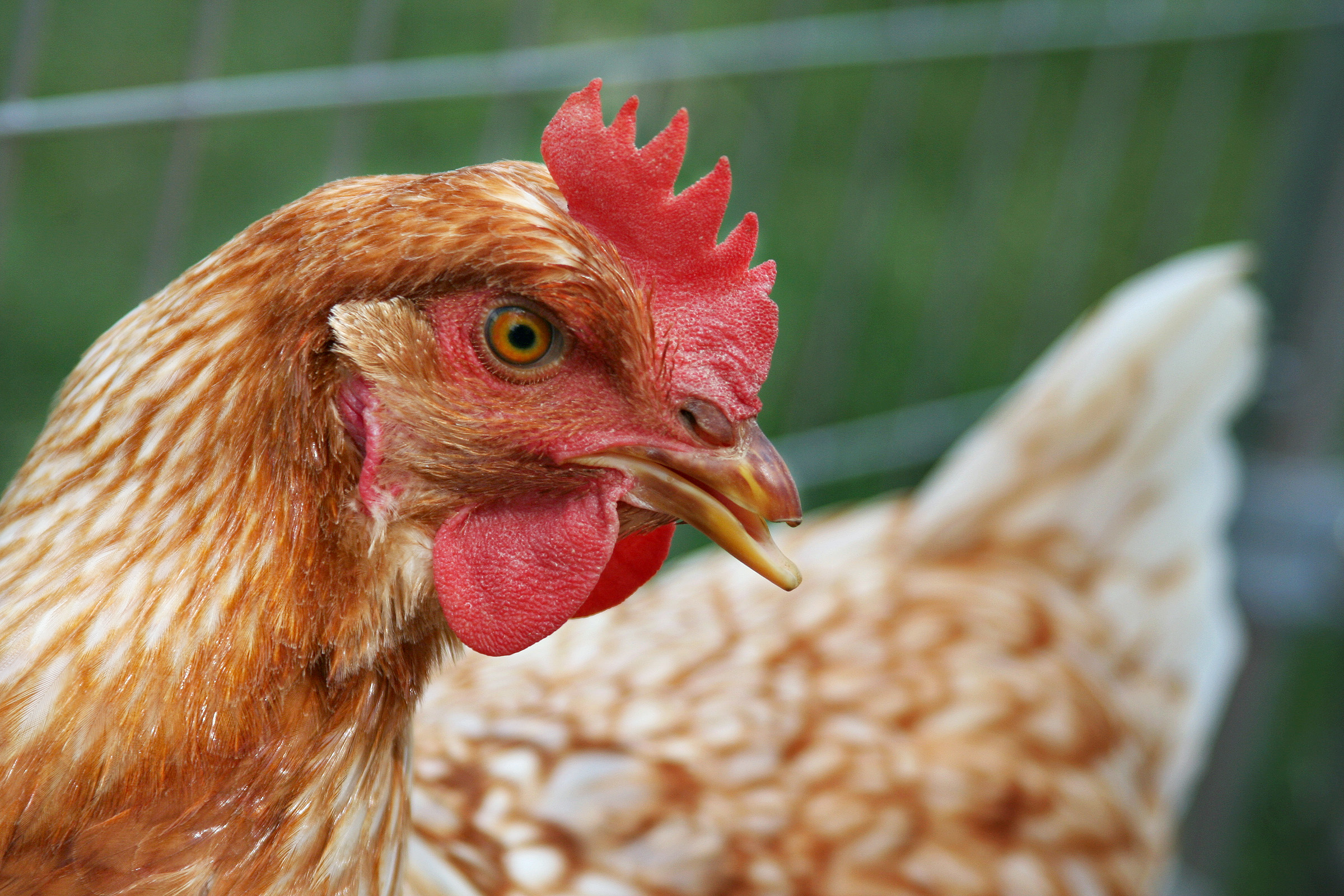
An adult bird which has been beak-trimmed as a chick

Beak trimming (also spelled as beak-trimming; informally as debeaking), or beak conditioning, is the partial removal of the beak of poultry, especially layer hens and turkeys, although it is also performed on some quail and ducks. When multiple birds are confined in small spaces, they are more likely to hurt each other through pecking. Beak trimming aims to avoid damage done by pecking, although the practice is criticized by animal welfare organizations and banned in several European countries. Beak trimming is most common in egg-laying strains of chickens. In some countries, such as the United States, turkeys routinely have their beaks trimmed. In the UK, only 10% of turkeys are beak trimmed.

In close confinement, cannibalism, feather pecking and aggression are common among turkeys, ducks, pheasants, quail, and chickens of many breeds (including both heritage breeds and modern hybrids) kept for eggs. The tendency to cannibalism and feather pecking varies among different strains of chickens, but does not manifest itself consistently. Some flocks of the same breed may be entirely free from cannibalism, while others, under the same management, may have a serious outbreak. Mortalities, mainly due to cannibalism, can be up to 15% in egg laying flocks housed in aviaries, straw yards, and free-range systems. Because egg laying strains of chickens can be kept in smaller group sizes in caged systems, cannibalism is reduced leading to a lowered trend in mortality as compared to non-cage systems. Cannibalism among flocks is highly variable and when it is not problematic, then mortalities among production systems are similar.

Opponents of beak trimming state that the practice reduces problem pecking by minor amounts compared to the trauma, injury, and harm done to the entire flock by beak trimming. Several countries have banned the practice, including Denmark (2013), Finland (1986), Germany (2017), the Netherlands (2019), Norway (1974) and Sweden (1988); analysts expect other European countries such as the UK to follow in the near future. Alternatives to beak trimming include enrichment or providing more space for the birds.

== History ==
=== Twentieth century ===
Beak trimming was developed at the Ohio Agricultural Experiment Station in the 1930s. The original technique was temporary, cutting approximately 6 mm (1/4 inch) off the beak. It was thought that the tip of the beak had no blood supply and presumably no sensation. The procedure was performed by hand with a sharp knife, either when deaths due to cannibalism became excessive, or when the problem was anticipated because of a history of cannibalism in the particular strain of chicken.

Cannibalism is a serious management problem dating back to the periods before intensive housing of poultry became popular. Poultry books written before vertical integration of the poultry industry describe the abnormal pecking of poultry:

Chicks and adult birds' picking at each other until blood shows and then destroying one another by further picking is a source of great loss in many flocks, especially when kept in confinement ... The recommendation of the Ohio Experiment Station of cutting back the tip of the upper beak has been found to be effective until the beak grows out again.

Cannibalism has two peaks in the life of a chicken; during the brooding period and at the onset of egg laying. The point-of-lay cannibalism is generally the most damaging and gets most of the attention. The temporary beak trimming developed at the Ohio Experiment Station assumed that cannibalism was a phase, and that blunting the beak temporarily would be adequate.

=== Twenty-first century ===
In the twenty-first century, the aim has been to develop more permanent beak trimming (although repeat trimming may be required), using electrically heated blades in a beak trimming machine, to provide a self-cauterizing cut. By 2012 there were four widely used methods of beak trimming: hot blade, cold blade (including scissors or secateurs), electrical (the Bio-beaker) and infrared. The latter two methods usually remove only the tip of the beak and do not leave an open wound; therefore they may offer improvements in welfare. Other approaches such as the use of lasers, freeze drying and chemical retardation have been investigated but are not in widespread use. The infrared method directs a strong source of heat into the inner tissue of the beak and after a few weeks, the tip of the upper and lower beak dies and drops off making the beak shorter with blunt tips. The Bio-beaker, which uses an electric current to burn a small hole in the upper beak, is the preferred method for trimming the beaks of turkeys. The Farm Animal Welfare Council (FAWC) wrote regarding beak trimming of turkeys that cold cutting was the most accurate method, but that substantial re-growth of the beak occurred; although the Bio-beaker limited beak re-growth, it was less accurate. It was considered that the hot cut was the most distressing procedure for turkeys.

In the UK, beak trimming of layer hens normally occurs at 1-day of age at the same time as the chick is being sexed and vaccinated.

The US's UEP guidelines suggest that in egg laying strains of chickens, the length of the upper beak distal from the nostrils that remains following trimming, should be 2 to 3 mm. In the UK, the Farm Animal Welfare Council stated: "The accepted procedure is to remove not more than one third of the upper and lower beaks or not more than one third of the upper beak only" but went on to recommend: "Where beak trimming is carried out, it should, wherever possible, be restricted to beak tipping; that is the blunting of the beak to remove the sharp point which can be the cause of the most severe damage to other birds."

== Legislation ==
Laws regarding beak trimming around the world: Nationwide ban on beak trimming Some subnational bans on beak trimming Beak trimming legal No data

There is a trend towards prohibition of beak trimming in Europe over the course of decades. Analysts expect the practice to be gradually banned across the continent.

EU law allows member states to debeak poultry according to two regulations: Directive 1999/74/EC for laying hens allows beak trimming, while Directive 2007/43/EC for broilers permits beak trimming only in certain cases. As of April 2019, 80% of laying hens in the EU were estimated to be beak-trimmed.

Country	Legal	Since	Notes
Australia	Partial		Illegal in ACT; Vic and NSW considering a ban
Austria	No	2000	
Belgium	Yes	–	Regulated, considering a ban
Canada	Yes	–	Regulated
China	Yes	–	Unregulated
Denmark	No	2013–4	
Finland	No	1986	
France	Yes	–	Regulated
Germany	No	2017	
Luxembourg	Yes	–	Regulated, considering a ban
Netherlands	No	2019	Banned since 1 January 2019.
New Zealand	Yes	–	Regulated
Norway	No	1974	
Sweden	No	1988	
Switzerland	Yes	–	Regulated, considering a ban
United Kingdom	Yes	–	Regulated, considering a ban
United States	Yes	–	Regulated

=== Australia ===
As of July 2019, beak trimming is only banned in the Australian Capital Territory by means of the Animal Welfare Act 1992 (ACT) s 9C. It is currently debated in parliament whether debeaking should be banned in Victoria and New South Wales. A 2019 Voiceless report recommended the NSW Parliament to prohibit debeaking and instead '[introduce] enriched environmental conditions, such as litter and suitable range areas [to] encourage interaction and mental stimulation for hens. Better nutrition, lighting and parasite management may also help reduce injurious pecking.' In a 2015 survey conducted by the Humane Society International Australia, 91% of respondents stated that free range egg boxes should display whether the hens had undergone beak trimming.

=== Canada ===
Beak trimming is legal but regulated in Canada. The National Farm Animal Care Council's 2016 Poultry Code of Practice urges to 'make every effort to manage breeders so that physical alterations, such as beak trimming, are not necessary'; should it prove necessary, however, infrared treatment is recommended over hot blade treatment.

=== China ===
There are no regulations on beak trimming in the People's Republic of China. Some companies have decided to voluntarily phase out debeaking, such as Ningxia Xiaoming Farming and Animal Husbandry Co. Ltd.

=== France ===
In France, clipping beaks of poultry chickens is authorised only when it preserves the health and wellbeing of animals, meaning to limit the risks of cannibalism and pecking. It is only authorised on chicks less than 10 days old intended for laying eggs and must be carried out by qualified personnel. It can therefore be carried out by breeders and agricultural workers.

=== Germany ===
Agriculture Minister Christian Meyer announced that Germany would phase out beak trimming by 2017 due to animal welfare concerns.

=== Netherlands ===
A ban on beak trimming in the Netherlands was first announced in 1996, but due to objections from the poultry sector it was delayed for years. In June 2013, the government struck an agreement between poultry farmers and animal welfare groups to phase out debeaking and prohibit it in 2018. The prohibition on trimming eventually went into effect on 1 January 2019.

=== New Zealand ===
Beak trimming, officially known as 'beak tipping' in law, is legal but regulated in New Zealand. The Layer Hens Code of Welfare (last updated 1 October 2018) notes that the National Animal Welfare Advisory Committee (NAWAC) "encourages the industry to develop management systems to protect against all forms of injurious pecking without the need for beak tipping". The Code recommends that "[a]lternative strategies for managing injurious (feather) pecking that minimise the need for beak tipping should be employed e.g. use and availability of different foraging resources." In case that beak tipping is deemed necessary, however, it requires competent trained operators, must be carried out within 3 days of hatching (except in emergencies under veterinary supervision) and may not remove more than one-quarter of the upper or lower beaks.

=== Nordic countries ===
Norway was the first country in the world to outlaw beak trimming in 1974, followed by Finland in 1986 and Sweden in 1988. Beak trimming was subsequently phased out in Denmark in two stages: in 2013 for the enriched cage system and in 2014 for aviary and free range systems.

=== Switzerland ===
Beak trimming in Switzerland is legal but regulated; it is expected that the practice will be prohibited in the near future. Although the use of cages for layer hens was prohibited in 1992, by 2000 still 59% of flocks (61% of hens) was still debeaked.

=== United Kingdom ===
Beak trimming is legal but regulated in the UK; it is expected that the practice will be prohibited in the near future. In 2011, the British government set up the Beak Trimming Action Group (BTAG) to review the matter with representatives from different stakeholders, including the industry, the government, animal welfare groups and veterinarians. A late 2015 BTAG report endorsed by Farming Minister George Eustice concluded that banning it in January 2016 would be too early as the sector needed more time to change its management techniques in order to avoid feather pecking, but that beak trimming should be phased out in the future. Laying Hen Welfare Forum chairman Andrew Joret stated in March 2020: 'A ban is coming. In my opinion, we have five years at most to prepare for this. We need to work out ways of keeping birds well-feathered, and if we can, eventually do that without beak trimming.'

=== United States ===
Beak trimming is legal in the United States, but there are some regulations: producers need to have a beak-trimming policy, it may not be employed to improve feed efficiency, but may be used to prevent cannibalism.

Humane Society vice president Paul Shapiro stated that birds only resort to cannibalism when they are confined and have nothing to do. Reporters have stated that debeaking is only necessitated by farms' cramped and stressful condition. Industry groups have also stated that pecking behavior becomes worsened when hens are confined in close quarters.

== Welfare implications ==
Beak trimming can cause acute stress, and possibly chronic pain following the trimming. A bird's ability to consume food is impaired following beak trimming because of the new beak shape and pain. Most studies report reduced body weights and feed intake following beak trimming; however, by sexual maturity or peak egg production, growth rates are usually normal. Weight losses were reduced in chicks that were beak trimmed by infrared compared with chicks trimmed by a hot-blade.

White Leghorn pullets showing the results of beak trimming

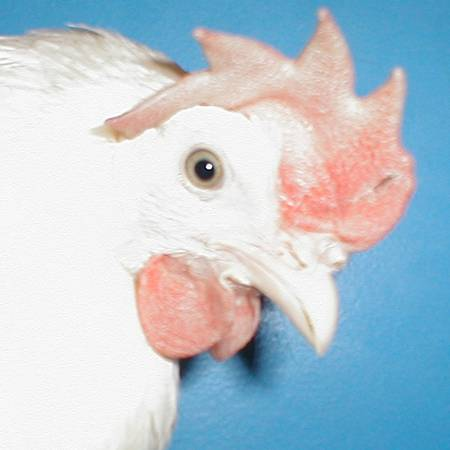
Non-beak trimmed

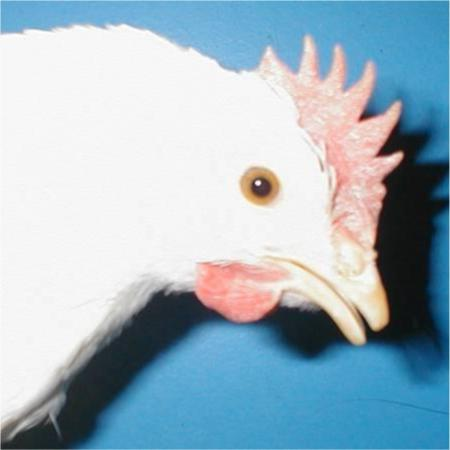
Beak trimmed

Pain caused by beak trimming depends on the age it is performed, the method of trimming and the length of beak that is removed. Beak trimming in the poultry industry usually occurs without anaesthetic at 1-day of age or when the chicks are very young, but can occur at a later age if an outbreak of feather pecking occurs, and in some cases, birds may be beak trimmed on repeated occasions. Beak trimming is not permitted in the UK on meat chickens that are aged over 10 days.

=== Acute pain ===
The beak is a complex, functional organ with an extensive nervous supply including nociceptors that sense pain and noxious stimuli. These would almost certainly be stimulated during beak trimming, indicating strongly that acute pain would be experienced. Behavioural evidence of pain after beak trimming in layer hen chicks has been based on the observed reduction in pecking behavior, reduced activity and social behavior, and increased sleep duration.

In Japanese quail, beak-trimming by cauterization caused lower body weights and feed intake in the period just after beak trimming. Beak trimmed Muscovy ducks spent less time engaging in beak-related behaviours (preening, feeding, drinking, exploratory pecking) and more time resting than non-trimmed ducks in the days immediately post-trim. These differences disappeared by 1 week post-trim. At 1 week post-trim the trimmed ducks weighed less than non-trimmed ducks, but this difference disappeared by 2 weeks post-trim. It is, however, unclear if the above changes in behaviour arise from pain or from a loss of sensitivity in the beak.

Pecking force has been found to decrease after beak trimming in adult hens, possibly indicating that hens are protecting a painful area from further stimulation. However, pecking force did not differ between chicks with or without minor beak-trims at 2 to 9 days of age, suggesting that chicks with minor beak-trims do not experience pain from the beak.

=== Chronic pain ===
Severe beak trimming or beak trimming birds at an older age is thought to cause chronic pain. Following beak trimming of older or adult hens, the nociceptors in the beak stump show abnormal patterns of neural discharge, which indicate acute pain. Neuromas, tangled masses of swollen regenerating axon sprouts, are found in the healed stumps of birds beak trimmed at 5 weeks of age or older and in severely beak trimmed birds. Neuromas have been associated with phantom pain in human amputees and have therefore been linked to chronic pain in beak trimmed birds. If beak trimming is severe because of improper procedure or done in older birds, the neuromas will persist which suggests that beak trimmed older birds experience chronic pain, although this has been debated.

=== Benefits ===
The benefits of beak trimming are mainly welfare advantages for birds kept in close confinement, some of which directly relate to increases (or reduced decreases) in production. These include reduced feather pecking and cannibalism, better feathering (though they find it hard to preen with shortened beaks, which means they are not cleaning themselves well), less fearfulness and nervousness, less chronic stress, and decreased mortality.

== Alternatives ==
A range of options have been proposed as possible alternatives to beak trimming including modifying the genetics of domesticated poultry to reduce cannibalistic tendencies. For confined housing where light control is possible, lowering light intensity so that birds cannot see each other as easily reduces antagonistic encounters and aggressive behaviour. Enrichment devices, introduced at an early age, such as simple objects hung in a habitat, can reduce aggressive behavior. Dividing the population into smaller group sizes reduces cannibalism, as overcrowding is the principal stressor of poultry. Proper body weight management that avoids underweight pullets reduces the probability of underweight pullets with uterine prolapse that leads to cloacal cannibalism. Additionally, free-range poultry and those given enrichment or more cubic space per animal suffer far less stress-related injuries and exhibit fewer cannibalistic tendencies.

== See also ==
- Livestock dehorning
- Overview of discretionary invasive procedures on animals
- Veterinary ethics
