= Humane Research Australia =

Australian nonprofit organization

Animal-Free Science Advocacy, formerly known as Humane Research Australia (HRA), and previously Australian Association for Humane Research (AAHR), is an Australian-based nonprofit anti-vivisection organisation.

== History ==
The organisation was founded in 1979 by Ms Elizabeth Ahlston.

It moved to Melbourne in early 2005 under the stewardship of newly appointed CEO Helen Marston.

Animal-Free Science Advocacy works professionally and ethically to develop community-wide awareness of animal experimentation; pursues all reasonable channels to eliminate such experimentation and champions the benefits of realistic, scientifically effective alternatives to all forms of animal usage in research and teaching.

The Association holds and maintain the following as core principles:

- Extrapolation of research data obtained from animal experimentation to humans is ineffective, inconclusive and often unnecessarily dangerous to humans.
- There are more scientifically reliable and effective ways to conduct research other than with the use of animals.
- Animal-based research and teaching represents unnecessarily cruel and unethical treatments of other sentient beings with little or no redeeming value for human or other species’ advancement.

== See also ==
- National Health and Medical Research Council
- Peta
- Animals Australia
