= Animal welfare and rights in Australia =

Treatment of and laws concerning non-human animals in Australia

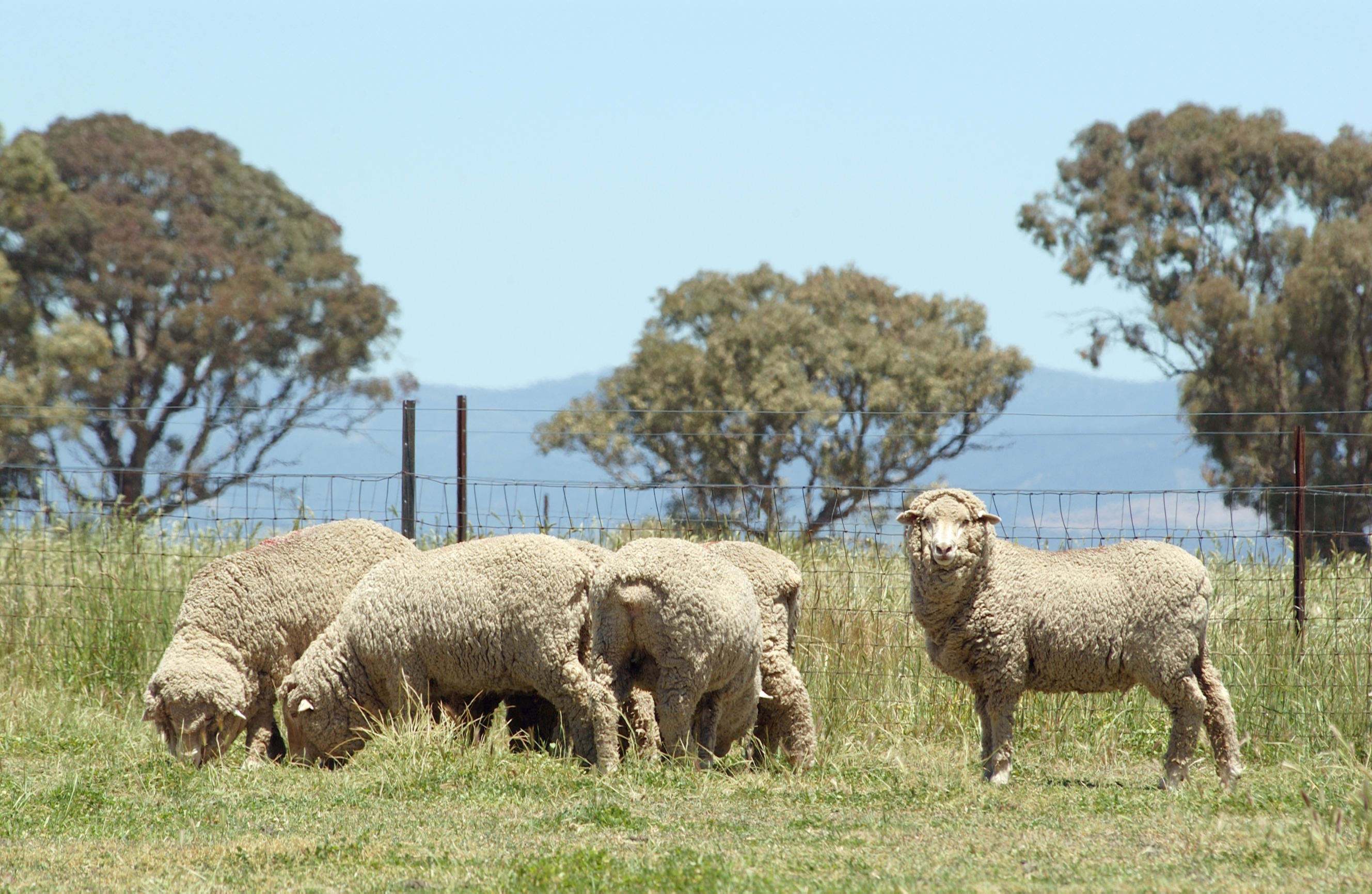
Sheep in Australia

This article is about the treatment of and laws concerning non-human animals in Australia. Australia has moderate animal protections by international standards.

== National legislation ==
There is little national animal welfare legislation in Australia; most animal welfare regulations are at the state and territory level.

The Australian Animal Welfare Strategy developed a framework for the adoption of a single animal welfare regulation model to be adopted by each state and territory government. This resulted in regulations for the Australian Animal Welfare Standards for the Land Transport of Livestock, which have been implemented in every state except Western Australia. The Advisory Committee related to the Strategy has been disbanded, and the responsibility for further developing the Strategy has been handed over to the states and territories and national funding for animal welfare withdrawn.

In 2014 Australia received a C out of possible grades A, B, C, D, E, F, G on World Animal Protection's Animal Protection Index.

== State legislation ==
=== New South Wales ===
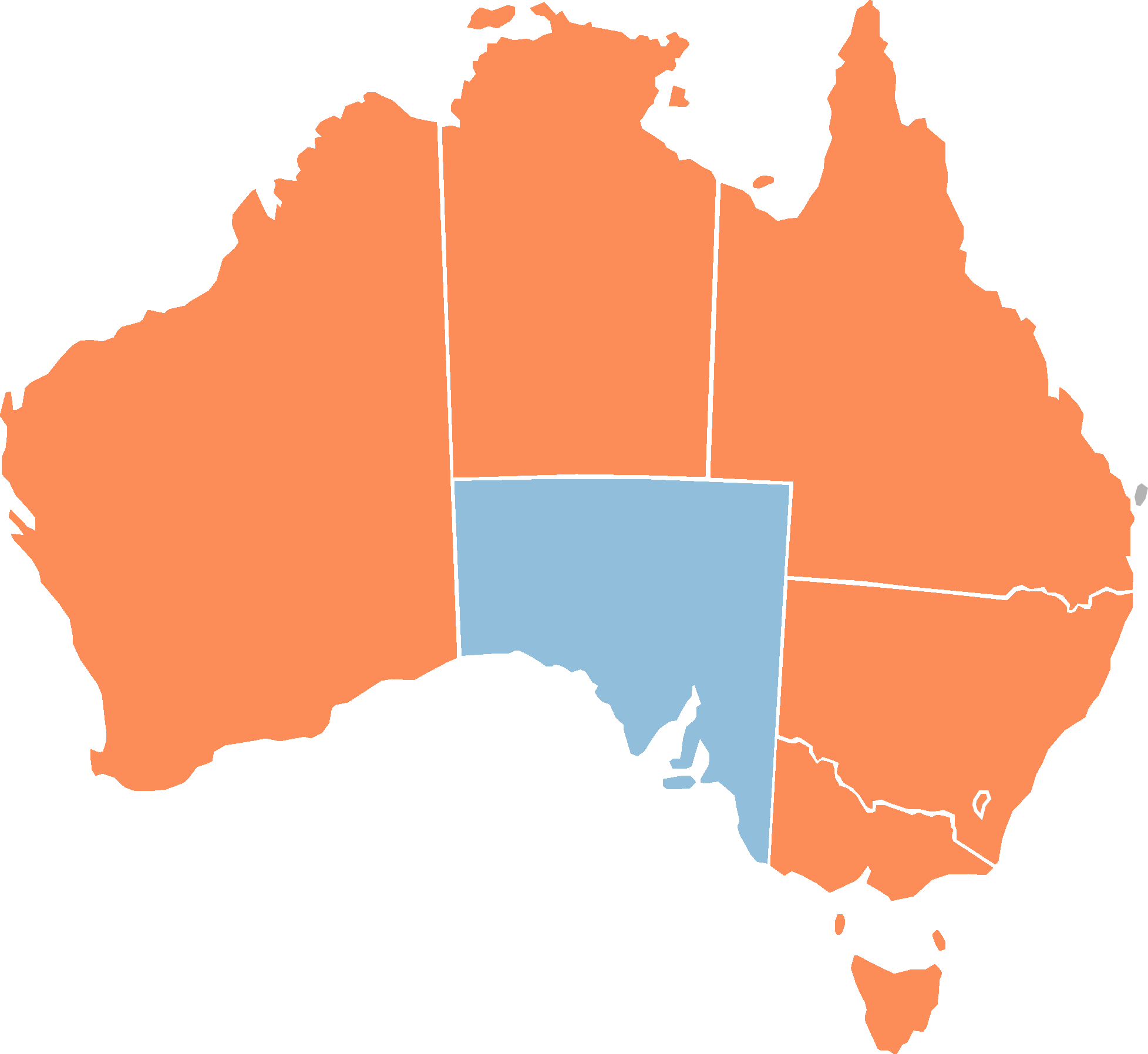
Australian state laws on killing cats or dogs for consumption: Killing cats or dogs is legal / Killing cats or dogs is illegal

The New South Wales 1979 Prevention of Cruelty to Animals Act prohibits cruelty to animals and creates a duty of care in animal users. These protections cover vertebrates as well as crustaceans invertebrates. The Act provides for the development of regulations relating to different species of farm animals, and codes for some species have been made.

=== South Australia ===
The 1985 Animal Welfare Act of South Australia prohibits "intentionally, unreasonably, or recklessly causing an animal unnecessary harm", and creates a duty of care in animal owners. This applies to vertebrates except fish. Mandatory standards on specified species, transport, saleyards, and slaughter are incorporated under the Animal Welfare Regulations 2012.

South Australia is the only Australian state to outlaw the consumption of dogs or cats, including the killing, processing and supply for human consumption.

=== Victoria ===
Victoria's 1986 Prevention of Cruelty to Animals Act prohibits cruelty to all vertebrates and all adult decapod crustaceans. There are mandatory codes on conditions for keeping domestic animals, transport, and slaughter.

=== Australian Capital Territory ===
The Australian Capital Territory's 1992 Animal Welfare Act prohibits cruelty by intentionally causing pain or failing to act. The law applies to vertebrates and cephalopods, as well as crustaceans intended for human consumption. With regard to farm animals, the Act prohibits debeaking and keeping commercial laying hens and pigs in "accommodation that is not appropriate", and provides for codes of practice on issues such as transport and slaughter to be made.

=== Tasmania ===
Tasmania's 1993 Animal Welfare Act prohibits doing or failing to do any act which causes or is likely to cause unreasonable and unjustifiable pain or suffering to an animal. This applies to vertebrates. The Act provides Standards and Guidelines on the welfare of different species including during transport and slaughter.

=== Northern Territory ===
The 2000 Animal Welfare Act of the Northern Territory prohibits causing unnecessary suffering and creates a duty of care. The Act does not specifically address farm animal welfare. However, the Northern Territory Livestock Act 2009 regulate welfare during transport to slaughter.

=== Queensland ===
Queensland's 2001 Animal Care and Protection Act prohibits acts of cruelty and creates a duty of care, which applies to vertebrates and to prescribed cephalopods and malacostraca. There are compulsory codes on livestock transport and partly compulsory codes on pigs and poultry.

=== Western Australia ===
In Western Australia, the 2002 Animal Welfare Act prohibits acts of cruelty and causing unnecessary harm, including by abandonment. The law covers vertebrates other than fish. Western Australia's Animal Welfare (General) Regulations 2003 provide guidance on the welfare of animals during transport and slaughter as well as the welfare of specific species.

== Animal welfare issues ==
=== Animal agriculture ===
Each year, 520-620 million animals are killed in Australian slaughterhouses: 460-550 million broiler chickens, 3-5 million turkeys, 8 million ducks, 4-5 million pigs, 11-12 million layer hens, 4 million bulls, bullocks, and steers, 10 million cattle, 700,000-900,000 calves, 5-7 million sheep, and 17-19 million lambs. A further 12 million male chicks are culled, and many more animals die on farms, including an estimated 15 million lambs who die each year within 48 hours of birth due to inadequate protection from harsh weather.

The majority of these animals (around 500 million annually) are farmed intensively. De-beaking, de-toeing, tail-docking, tooth pulling, castration, and dehorning of livestock without anaesthetic are not illegal (though debeaking is prohibited in the Australian Capital Territory), nor is confinement in veal crates, gestation crates and battery cages.

In 2014, Australia produced 152,210 tons of wild-caught sea animals and 74,913 tons of aquaculture animals.

==== "Ag-gag" laws ====
In Australia, several laws have been passed to strengthen existing laws for trespass, theft and vandalism—aimed at reducing animal rights vigilantism (according to livestock farmers) or gagging (according to activists).

Between 2015 and 2017, New South Wales passed several laws addressing trespass by "vegan vigilantes" at farms and slaughterhouses within bills about biosecurity. The Right to Farm Bill 2019 added criminal penalties for those who damage property, release livestock, or induce others to commit "aggravated unlawful entry".

The Australian Government passed the Criminal Code Amendment (Agricultural Protection) Act 2019 which introduced further penalties for those who publish information on the internet with the intent of inciting other "green-collared criminals" to "unlawfully damage or destroy property, or commit theft, on agricultural land". The 2019 legislation was in response to escalating animal rights activism incited through online posts and websites, leading to harassment and criminal behavior such as mass farm invasions, livestock theft and damage, often live-streamed online. In one incident a dairy farm was stormed by 100 activists and in another, cows were let loose in the road, a building was burned, and machinery damaged. In 2019, an animal rights group published a map on the internet revealing contact details and private information of farmers and slaughterhouses. A survey of pork farmers revealed 41% had experienced a raid by animal activists and 43% had had images posted online. The legislation was aimed at those "inciting others to commit unlawful trespass or other offenses in the homes and on the lands of our farmers."

=== Live export of animals ===
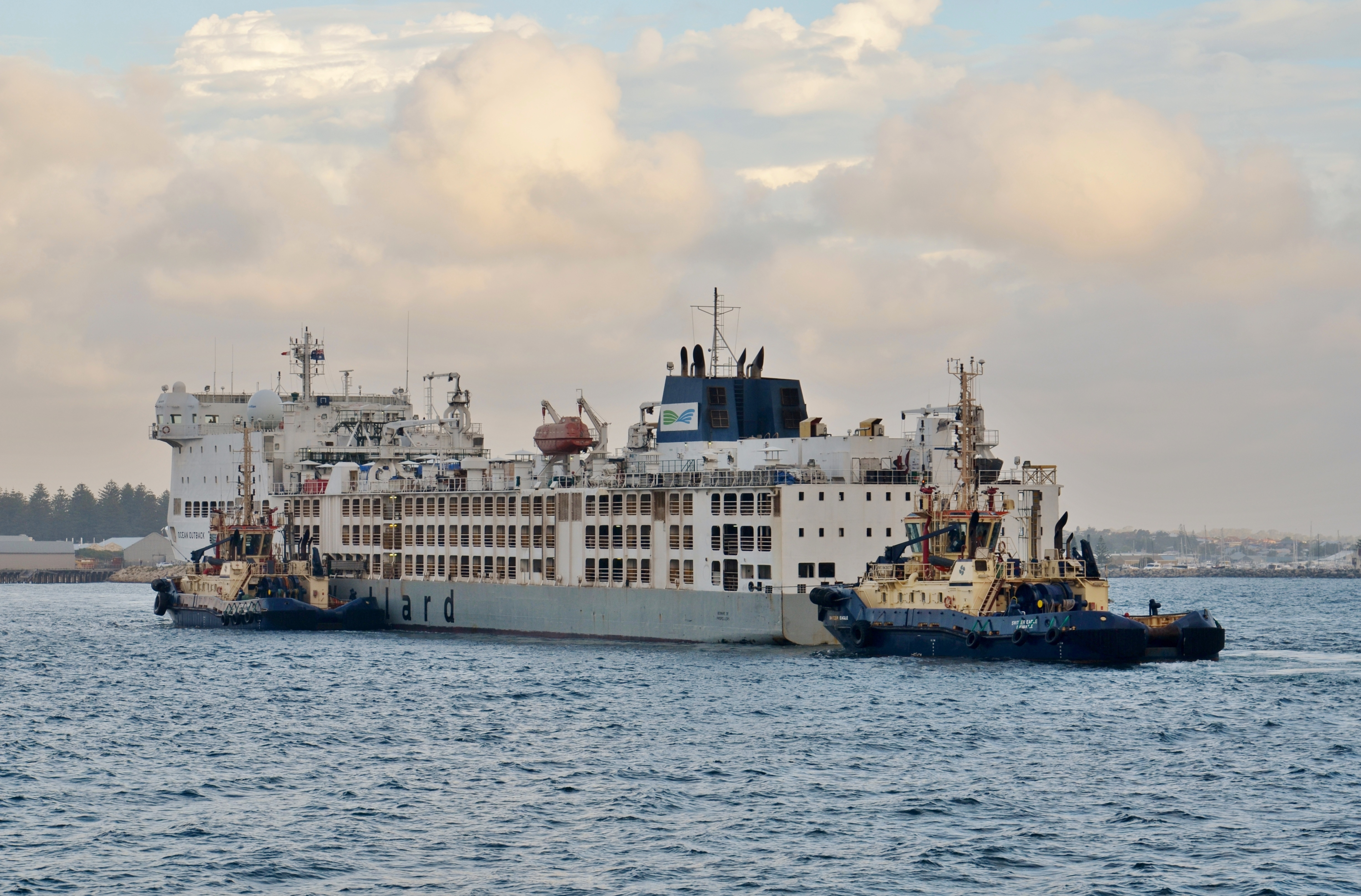
A live export ship in Fremantle, Western Australia

Australia is the world's largest live exporter of animals for slaughter. The trade involved over three million animals in 2011 valued at approximately A$1 billion, of which the majority were cattle and sheep.as of 2014.

The export of live animals from Australia has generated some controversy, with animal rights organisations such as Animals Australia asking it to be banned on the grounds that certain countries where animals are shipped have no laws to protect them from cruelty. In 2011, the Gillard government briefly suspended the trade and came close to a ban. Exports have since resumed.

=== Animal product consumption ===
In 2014 Australia surpassed the United States as the world's highest per-capita consumer of land-animal meat (beef, veal, pork, chicken, and lamb), at 90.21 kilograms per person. This figure has been rising over the past two decades, up from 77 kilograms per person in 1979. Annual per capita seafood consumption is approximately 25 kg. In 2013/14 Australians ate 213.3 eggs per capita and drank 105 liters of milk per capita. Studies have found that meat consumption is heavily linked with obesity, cancer and diabetes.

=== Veganism and vegetarianism ===
In 2010 the Vegetarian/Vegan Society of Queensland Incorporated conducted a survey of 1202 Australians in which 5% identified as vegetarian and 1% identified as vegan. However, based on respondent reports of what foods they had recently eaten, only 2% actually ate a vegetarian diet (no animal flesh) and only 1 respondent ate a vegan diet (no animal products).

As of March 2016, 11.2% of people living in Australia, 2.1 million people, said "The food I eat is all, or almost all, vegetarian." The report also found that vegetarians were likely to be slimmer; while 60.7% of Australian adults have a Body Mass Index that qualifies as overweight or obese, this figure drops to 45.4% of those whose diet is mostly or totally vegetarian.

=== Humane slaughter ===
Animals Australia and RSPCA Victoria state that all animals should be stunned prior to slaughter because of the suffering they experience during their slaughter. According to the Australian Department of Agriculture, "Australia's state and territory governments have primary responsibility for animal welfare and laws to prevent cruelty". Four abattoirs in the state of Victoria, Australia have government exemptions allowing them to slaughter animals without prior stunning. These abattoirs are : "Hardwick's Meat Works" of Kyneton; "GA Gathercole" of Carrum; "Mc Herd" of Geelong; and "Midfield Meats" of Warrnambool.

=== Animals used in research ===
According to Humane Research Australia (HRA) approximately 7 million animals were used in research and teaching in Australia in 2014, up from around 6.5 million in 2004. Statistics from four Australian states indicate that 6,613 dogs, 2,183 cats, 676,066 "native mammals" (including koalas, wallabies, possums, and wombats), 202 primates, 2,023,834 mice, 113,158 rats, 333,922 sheep, and 425,994 domestic fowl (including chickens and ducks) and 384,225 birds, 315,328 fish, 83,922 amphibians, 30,698 reptiles, and 684,107 "other aquatic animals" were used. HRA notes that there is no national collection of animal use statistics, and that these are "very conservative" figures.

In 2016, following HRA and the Humane Society International's Be Cruelty-Free campaign, the Australian government pledged to ban testing cosmetics on animals and the sale of cosmetics that have been tested on animals.

== Animal activism ==
Animals Australia is an organization whose activities include public advertising on issues related to farm animal welfare, undercover investigations of animal farming operations, and corporate outreach. Their corporate campaigns resulted in cage-free egg commitments from McDonald's and Subway. Animals Australia is currently one of Animal Charity Evaluators' (ACE) Standout Organizations.

World Animal Protection is an organisation that works to build a world where animal welfare matters and animal cruelty has ended. Their work focuses on making sure the Australian Government and companies operating in Australia are doing their part to protect the 70 billion animals born in farming each year. The organisation also works to protect animals against abuse in the region, as well as protect sea animals from abandoned fishing nets and other threats.

Animal Liberation is an Australian animal protection group founded in 1976 whose mission is "to work toward the end of suffering of exploited and confined animals, through legislation, consumer advocacy, action and humane education." Animal Liberation Victoria (ALV) is a particularly active branch which has conducted highly publicized open rescues of farm animals, protests against animal farming including blocking transport trucks and ships, and vegan education.

In South Australia, the first president of Animal Liberation SA was George Karolyi, who later founded the Vegan Society of South Australia and the South Australian Federation of Animal Societies, which for many years organised an annual World Animals Day parade in Adelaide.

Their recent activism includes a release of undercover investigation footage showing the painful deaths of pigs killed by carbon dioxide in Victorian slaughterhouses in late 2015, alongside activists chaining themselves to slaughterhouses. ALV is critical of the Royal Society for the Prevention of Cruelty to Animals, for its Approved Farming Scheme—which, according to ALV, supports cruel animal farms—and serving "BBQ along with the eggs of abused chickens" at fundraisers.

== See also ==
- Duck hunting in South Australia
- Animal consciousness
- Animal Management in Rural and Remote Indigenous Communities (AMMRIC)
- Animal rights movement
- Cruelty to animals
- List of animal rights advocates
- Million Paws Walk
- Timeline of animal welfare and rights
