= Live export =

Cross-border movement of livestock by ship, rail, road or air

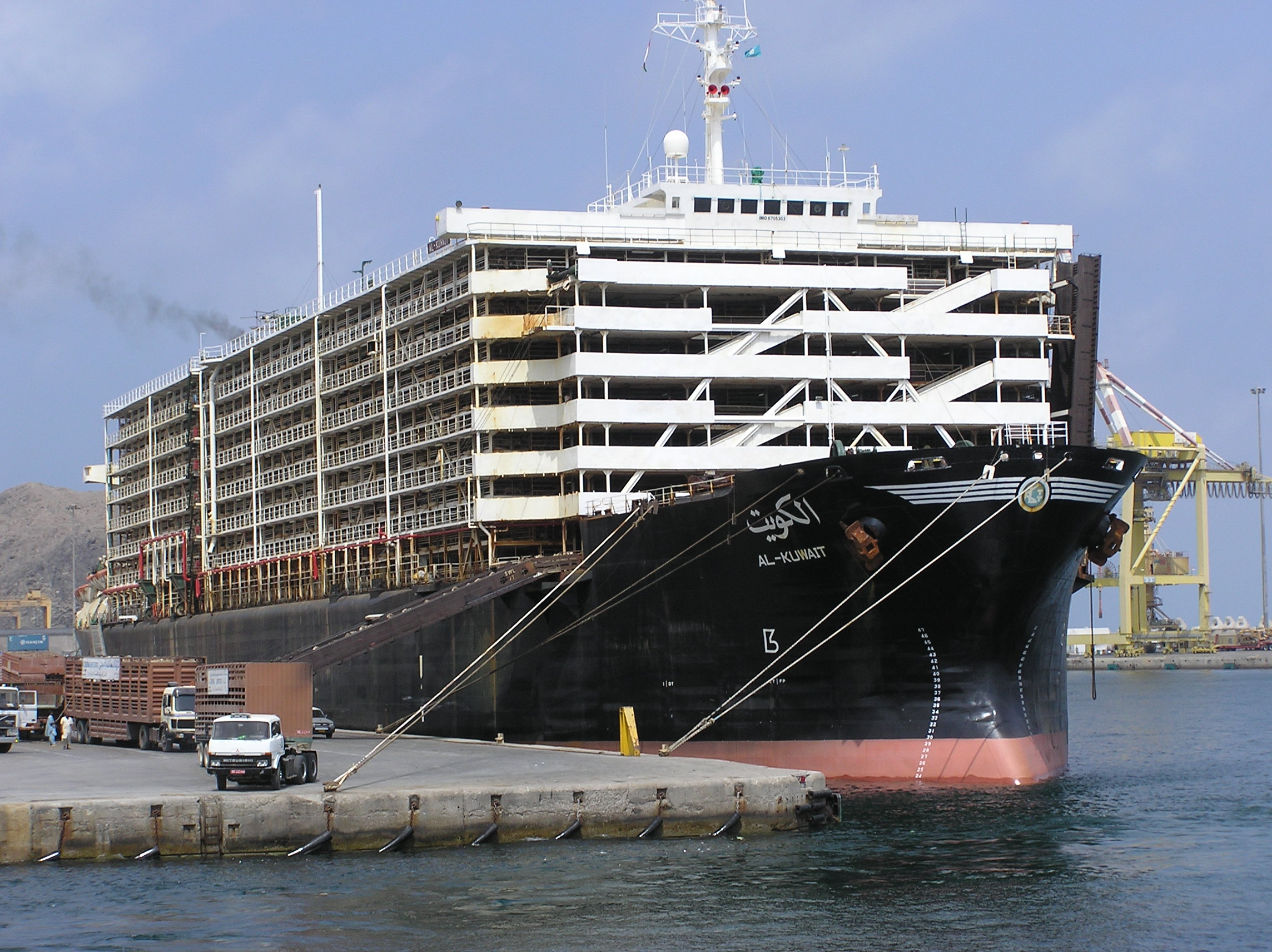
Purpose-built sheep carrier

Live export is the commercial transport of livestock across national borders. The trade involves a number of countries with the Australian live export industry being one of the largest exporters in the global trade. According to the Australian Bureau of Statistics, exports of live sheep rose 21.4% and live calves increased 9.7% between March 2017 and March 2018. During 2017 alone, Australia exported 2.85 million living animals in shipping containers and airplanes. The expansion of the trade has been supported by the introduction of purpose-built ships which carry large numbers of animals. The amount of livestock exported from the European Union grew to nearly 586m kilograms between 2014 and 2017, a 62.5% increase during the time period.

The rising global demand for meat has resulted in the quadrupling of the export of live farm animals in the last half century, with two billion being exported in 2017, up from one billion in 2007. Roughly five million animals are in transit every day.

There has been strong criticism of the industry on animal rights grounds by animal rights organizations and the media. New Zealand has effectively phased out live exports for slaughter purposes since 2007 due to concerns about animals.

== Australia ==
=== Market and legislation ===
Australia is one of the world's largest exporters of sheep and cattle. According to Meat and Livestock Australia, 2.44 million sheep were exported to markets in Asia and the Middle East in 2012, reduced from 4.2 million in 2008. The total number of cattle exported in 2012 was 617, 301, down 11% from the previous year. Indonesia accounted for 45% of total live cattle exports from Australia in 2012. Total cattle exports to Indonesia reduced by 33% from 2011.

The reduction in cattle exports to Indonesia in 2012 was partly due to the newly imposed ESCAS (Exporter Supply Chain Assurance Scheme) from 2011, and partly due to Indonesia's move to become self-sufficient in beef production. Most of the livestock are for human consumption but there is also an active trade in breeding stock, including dairy cattle.

The Department of Agriculture and Water Resources controls the Australian Standards for the Export of Livestock. The standards were amended in April 2011 (version 2.3). The department also introduced ESCAS (Exporter Supply Chain Assurance Scheme), in 2011 — a system requiring exporters to provide evidence of compliance with internationally agreed animal welfare standards, and to demonstrate traceability and control through the supply chain. According to the department, ESCAS was developed in response to evidence of cruelty to Australian cattle in Indonesia, and then extended to all livestock exports for the purpose of slaughter. See Animal Welfare section.

Australian Quarantine and Inspection Service (AQIS) manages quarantine controls to minimise the risk of exotic pests and diseases entering the country. AQIS also provides import and export inspection and certification to help retain Australia's highly favourable animal, plant and human health status and wide access to overseas export markets.

Other key markets include Israel, Malaysia, Japan, Mexico and China. The major markets for Australian sheep are Kuwait and Jordan. Other key markets are Bahrain, the UAE, Oman and Qatar. Australia's main market competitors are from China, South America and North Africa.

=== Campaigns ===
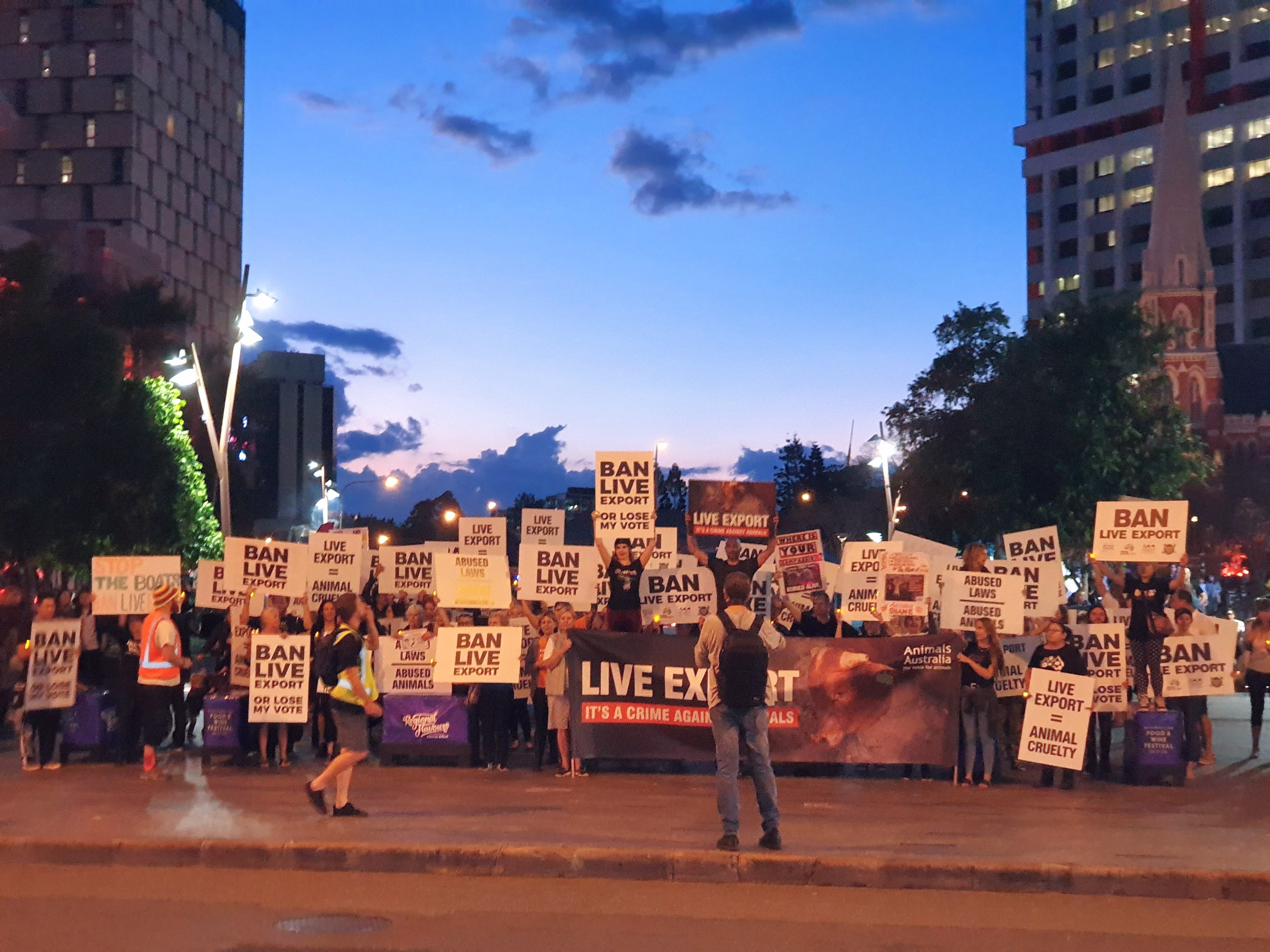
An anti Live Export trade protest in Brisbane, June 2019

Australia's live export industry has experienced significant scrutiny by animal welfare groups since 2003. The RSPCA is opposed to live export. Over 550,000 animals are reported to have died en route during live export journeys between 2000–2012. A 2006 Freedom of Information report revealed sheep died on route due to several factors including heat stress, septicaemia and acute pneumonia. Dr Lynn Simpson, a former on-board vet for the live export industry, made a submission to the Department of Agriculture in March 2013 condemning animal welfare conditions on live export ships. A group of former live export vets - Vets Against Live Export (VALE) has formed to oppose the trade. Prominent former live export veterinarians who have spoken out against the conditions on ships include Dr Lloyd Reeve Johnson, who expressed his concern about the conflict of interest involved in live export companies paying for animal welfare advice, Dr Tony Hill, who was allegedly pressured to report 105 mortalities when in fact 2000 sheep had died, and Dr Kerkenezov, who has urged an end to an industry he calls "cruel."

In March 2011, Animals Australia investigators collected footage which showed Australian cattle being slaughtered at 11 abattoirs in Indonesia with practices that infringed upon OIE standards for animal welfare. Animals Australia and RSPCA Australia jointly complained to the federal Department of Agriculture, Fisheries and Forestry, calling for a ban on live exports. In response to the footage, live exports to Indonesia were suspended by the Australian Minister for Agriculture from 7 June 2011 until 6 July 2011. The suspension was lifted with the new Exporter Supply Chain Assurance System in place, outlining mandatory compliance for all importing markets of Australian live animals for slaughter, with international standards for animal welfare. The ESCAS regulatory framework is applicable across all importing markets as of 31 December 2012.

The footage was the subject of a separate investigation conducted by ABC program, Four Corners, shown on 30 May 2011. The report entitled "A Bloody Business" was the winner of a Logie Award for "Most Outstanding Public Affairs Report" as well as the 2011 Gold Walkley Award.

In November 2012, another widely reported investigation by Animals Australia brought attention to the slaughter of 22,000 Australian sheep in an ESCAS-approved feedlot in Pakistan, after weeks at sea upon the initial consignment being rejected by Bahrain due to claimed fears of disease. The video footage of the cull, obtained by Animals Australia "shows absolute chaos with animals being dragged, beaten, having their throats sawn at with blunt knives and thrown into mass graves -- some of them still alive hours later." Animals Australia's Campaign Director, Lyn White, stated of the incident:

Exporters cannot deny responsibility - they put live animals on ships - knowing the scale of risks and factors outside their control. They cannot then say, 'it's not our fault' when the inevitable happens and something goes terribly wrong.

On 6 May 2013 a report aired on Australia's ABC 7.30, revealing footage of cruelty to Australian cattle in at least one Egyptian abattoir. The footage, provided to the Australian Department of Agriculture by animal protection group Animals Australia, led to a suspension of live trade to Egypt. Australian Agriculture Minister Joe Ludwig described the footage as "sickening", and the Australian Live Exporters' Council chief executive, Alison Penfold, said she was "distraught and disgusted".

In May 2013, evidence was provided to the Department of Agriculture showing what is alleged to be Australian goats being roughly handled and sold outside of approved facilities in Malaysia. The footage also allegedly showed breaches of required animal welfare standards during slaughter of Australian cattle. The department confirmed it had reviewed the footage and launched an investigation.

Animals Australia report to have conducted a total of 30 separate investigations into the live export industry between May 2003 and April 2014.

=== Research into Australian live export ===
In 2009, the World Animal Protection live export campaign commissioned economic think tank ACIL Tasman to undertake economic research into the live export trade. This research found that there are potential value adding opportunities being lost in Australia due to trade distortions in the live export trade. The report analysed the economics and policy settings of the live sheep export trade from Western Australia and demonstrated that a sheep processed domestically is worth 20% more to the Australian economy than one exported live.

In October 2012, World Animal Protection published a further piece of research into the live export trade. This research found that if a cattle processing facility was built in the Northern Territory or North-Western Australia, in conjunction with live export, there would potentially be an increase of 245% or more in gross earnings for Australian cattle producers, more than 1,300 jobs for unemployed Australians and gross regional product growth of $204 million per annum.

In August 2011, two bills were presented to Australian Parliament calling for an end to live exports on animal welfare grounds, by Independent Senator Nick Xenophon and the Australian Greens Party. Both bills were rejected by the House of Representatives.

== European Union ==
The EU introduced new legislation in 2004, which was planned to come into force in 2007. Agriculture Ministers from individual states who make up the Council however, have deferred decisions on a package of reforms, including journey times, until 2011. They have adopted some reforms that offer more training and certification for drivers by 2009.

The legislation was also written with the aim of covering better loading and unloading facilities.

In September 2020, Dutch Agriculture Minister Carola Schouten requested the EU Agriculture and Fisheries Council to adjust animal welfare regulations and limit the transport of livestock for slaughter; a special EU committee on animal transport commenced hearings in October.

=== Germany ===
In late 2020, a regional court in Germany prohibited the live exportation of 132 breeding heifers because the conditions under which they would be slaughtered in Morocco would be "inhumane".

== New Zealand ==
In 2005, New Zealand exported NZ$217 million worth of live animals, mainly for breeding purposes. Exports included cattle, sheep, horses, deer, goats and day-old chicks. Because New Zealand is free from most exotic diseases most livestock shipments are for breeding or finishing purposes. Cattle are not exported for slaughter and the last export of sheep for slaughter was in 2003.

In November 2007, the New Zealand Government introduced the new Customs Exports Prohibition (Livestock for Slaughter) Order. Although not a blanket ban, the new legal requirement restricts live animal exports for slaughter unless the risks to animals and New Zealand's trade reputation can be adequately managed. There has been no export of livestock for slaughter purposes since that date. New Zealand does still export live finfish and shellfish.

In September 2020, the New Zealand Government suspended live cattle exports after the Gulf Livestock 1 transport ship capsized with 43 crew members and nearly 6,000 cattle on board. The ship was carrying cattle for breeding from the country to China. On 14 April 2021, the Government of New Zealand announced that, in order to raise animal welfare standards, it had decided to phase out the export of livestock by sea by 2023 after a transition period of up to two years. It was the first country in history to do so; activists called on Australia and other states to follow suit.

New Zealand has partaken in no live animal exports for slaughter since 2003, after 4000 sheep died on a ship bound for Saudi Arabia. In 2012, the President of the Federated Farmers of New Zealand was quoted as saying:

The worry we had is the repetitional risk of a very small number of sheep being transported live to other parts of the world was just too great against the very large processed export industry we have with sheep meat.

Animal welfare groups in New Zealand continue to call for a ban on live export of animals for breeding purposes. SAFE has stated that live exports pose "potential for serious suffering."

== United Kingdom ==
Between 15 July 2002 and January 2004, around 200,000 lambs and sheep were exported for slaughter or further fattening abroad, mainly to France and Italy.

The Animal and Plant Health Agency (APHA) was responsible for conducting inspections of animals at the point of loading and at ports. Trading Standards also had powers to inspect animals during transport, and was responsible for carrying out any prosecutions under the regulations.

The Port of Ramsgate temporarily halted live transport after an incident in 2012, when 40 sheep were euthanised after being badly injured during transit. The decision was overturned by the High Court on the grounds that the port could not ban live animal exports on the grounds of freedom of movement with the EU and UK legislation.

After his appointment as Secretary of State for the Environment, Farming and Rural Affairs, Michael Gove indicated in July 2017 that Brexit would offer the opportunity to ban live animal export for slaughter.

UK Environment Secretary George Eustice unveiled plans to ban the export of live animals for slaughter and fattening from England and Wales on 3 December 2020. The plans still had to be finalised, would exclude poultry and not affect Northern Ireland (under EU law), but Scotland would probably follow the example of England and Wales.

On 4 December 2023 the UK Government announced new legislation set to ban live animal exports. On Monday 20 May 2024, the Bill to ban the export of live animals from the United Kingdom to countries overseas received royal assent and officially became law.

=== Campaigns ===
On 1 February 1995, English animal rights activist Jill Phipps was crushed to death under a lorry during a protest to stop the air export of live calves for veal near Coventry Airport.

The Battle of Brightlingsea refers to a series of protests by animal rights supporters held in Brightlingsea, England, between 16 January and 30 October 1995, to prevent the export of livestock through the town.

The trade in live exports was ended in 1996 due to an outbreak of mad cow disease. In 2006 this ban was lifted after which most UK live animal exports left out of the Port of Ramsgate and Port of Dover. In June 2011 a Ramsgate Town councillor, Ian Driver, spoke out in opposition to live exports.

Following a suspension of the trade a consignment of sheep left Dover for Calais during the night of 21–22 December 2010. On 12 September 2012, 46 sheep were euthanised after injuries inflicted due to transportation faults at the Port of Ramsgate. A temporary suspension on live exports from the Port was called by the Thanet Council.

== See also ==
- Animal–industrial complex
- Commodity status of animals
