= Animals Australia =

Australian animal protection organization

- Animals Australia logo since 2017
- Founded: 1980
- Founders: Peter Singer; Christine Townend
- Purpose: Animal welfare
- Location: Melbourne, Victoria
- Region served: Australia
- Method: Investigations; Public awareness
- Key people: Glenys Oogjes, Lyn White
- Website: animalsaustralia.org

Animals Australia is an Australian animal protection organisation. Its aim is to investigate and expose animal cruelty, inspire kindness to animals through public awareness campaigns—particularly focused on farmed animals—and provide funding and support to other animal organisations where appropriate, for example in emergency response during the 2019/2020 Australian Black Summer bushfires and COVID-19 pandemic.

Animals Australia's organisational vision is "a world where kindness, compassion and respect extend to all living beings. We shine a light in the darkness and illuminate the pathway to a kinder world for all."

Animals Australia is a registered charity, funded entirely by members of the public, and was previously one of Animal Charity Evaluators Standout Charities.

== History ==
Animals Australia formed in 1980, originally as the Australian Federation of Animal Societies, founded by Peter Singer and Christine Townend. Animal protection groups in New Zealand were invited to join in 1986 and the organisation became the Australian and New Zealand Federation of Animal Societies. This formal Australian-New Zealand association ceased in 2005 and the federation now only uses the name "Animals Australia"—the name adopted as an Australian trading name in the late 1990s. Animals Australia representatives have contributed to Government enquiries and animal welfare law reform since the 1980s, and currently serve on State 'Animal Welfare Advisory Committees' and the Australian Animal Welfare Advisory Committee (AusAWAC).

== Campaigns ==
Animals Australia conducts investigations and public awareness campaigns on a range of animal welfare issues, including rodeos, horse racing, the fur trade, animal testing, the dairy industry, fishing, flying fox conservation, kangaroo shooting, exotic animal circuses, sheared sheep, mulesing, duck shooting, puppy farms and greyhound racing. However they are most noted for their major work towards ending factory farming, the live export trade, greyhound racing, and "legalised cruelty" to farmed animals.

Their subsidiary group for young animal advocates between the ages 13–26 is Animals Australia Unleashed.

Animals International is the global arm of Animals Australia. Established in 2014, Animals Australia campaigners have provided international colleague groups with evidence relating to cruelty in live exports; lobbied the OIE to improve animal welfare guidelines; worked with the Princess Alia Foundation to improve slaughter practices in Jordan and contributed to creation of animal welfare legislation in Egypt, Mauritius and Jordan, amongst other projects.

=== Live exports ===
==== Slaughter practices ====
Animals Australia's investigations in the Middle East in 2006 resulted in the first suspension of the live export trade and a benchmark prosecution of a live export company for cruelty.

Their investigations into the export of Australian cattle to Indonesia in 2011, which showed animals being subjected to eye-gouging, tail-breaking, multiple throat cuts, "roping slaughter" and incorrect use of slaughter restraint boxes, led to a temporary suspension of the trade to Indonesia and the implementation of industry-wide Supply Chain Assurance Standards, monitored by the Australian Department of Agriculture, Fisheries and Forestry. The Indonesian investigation led to an exposé by ABC TV's Four Corners program entitled "A Bloody Business" which earned the reporters a Gold Walkley Award and Logie for 'Most Outstanding Public Affairs Report'.

In 2020, Animals Australia again submitted video evidence to the Department of Agriculture showing Australian cattle being slaughtered in Indonesia using methods that breached live export standards (ESCAS)

==== Heat stress on ships ====
Whistleblower footage provided to Animals Australia, and shown by the organisation to then-Agriculture Minister David Littleproud, depicted Australian sheep suffering severe heat stress on board the Awassi Express live export ship and several other live export voyages to the Middle East during 2017. Sheep were shown "dead and decaying", lying in excrement, panting and unable to reach food and water. Littleproud was quoted as saying the footage was "very disturbing,” and that he was “shocked and gutted".

This evidence, along with scientific review highlighting the inherent risk of heat stress during the Northern Hemisphere summer, led to the Australian Government prohibiting live sheep shipments from Australia during the highest-risk months of the year, being May to October.

The exporter responsible for the Awassi Express was also implicated in the deaths of 3000 Australian sheep from heat stress on board the Al Messilah in 2016, and the Federal Government has revoked the company's export licence.

=== Factory farming ===
In October 2012 Animals Australia launched its largest ever public awareness campaign initiative called "Make it Possible", with the goal of ending factory farming in Australia. A series of advertisements, featuring animated pigs and chickens and a musical soundtrack to the song Somewhere, performed by players from the Sydney Symphony Orchestra, was played on commercial television stations and in cinemas. The two-minute film received the 2012 Mobius Award for excellence in advertising for the cinema/in-flight category. The film was accompanied by celebrity endorsements, such as from Michael Caton, Missy Higgins, Dave Hughes, Michelle Bridges, Rove McManus and others. In response to the Make it Possible campaign, Coles supermarkets announced a fast-tracked phase out of battery cage eggs and pork products produced with the use of sow stalls for their home brand products by January 2013.

In December 2020, Animals Australia launched 'Somewhere', an evolution of the Make it Possible campaign, on behalf of all farmed animals.

=== Greyhound racing ===
Following joint investigations with Animal Liberation Queensland, in February 2015 Animals Australia exposed 'live baiting' training methods in the greyhound industry, reigniting the campaign to end greyhound racing. The campaign reveals some top figures within greyhound racing using live possums, rabbits and piglets as 'bait' to train their greyhounds. It also focuses on the widespread abuse of greyhounds in the industry, including the killing of thousands of young and healthy dogs every year.

In December 2015, Animals Australia exposed the export of Australian greyhounds to China and Macau. At the Canidrome racetrack in Macau life-threatening injuries are a daily occurrence, and no Australian greyhound is on record as surviving for longer than three years. Canidrome has a 100% euthanasia rate of Australian greyhounds.

The Vietnamese greyhound racing industry, where investigation footage reveals unwanted dogs being injected with an insecticide and dying in agony, was set up by Australian industry interests.

=== 'Somewhere'—legalised cruelty to farmed animals ===
In December 2020, Animals Australia launched 'Somewhere': a prime time public awareness campaign on behalf of farmed animals, highlighting how Australian animals raised and killed for food are left exposed to cruel routine practices by industry exemptions to animal cruelty laws. These practices include painful surgical procedures without pain relief like castration, de-horning and disbudding, teeth-cutting and tail clipping; severe confinement (as in the case of hens in battery cages or mother pigs in farrowing crates); and distressing gas stunning during slaughter. The campaign encourages caring Australians that "your choices can change their world."

The name of the campaign comes from that of the Sondheim/Bernstein song, 'Somewhere', originally from the musical West Side Story, which plays in the campaign television ad. The song's lyrics of "Someday, somewhere/We'll find a new way of living" and "Peace and quiet and open air wait for us/Somewhere" are used to poignantly highlight the suffering of pigs and other animals in factory farms; and suggest that their "dreams" of freedom could come true.

== People ==
=== Glenys Oogjes—Chief Executive Officer ===
Glenys Oogjes is one of Australia's longest serving animal advocates. She was raised on a Victorian dairy farm and has a degree in Behavioural Science. She has contributed to many national reviews of Codes of Practice and animal welfare laws in each Australian State and Territory. Oogjes has also worked to achieve greater protection for animals through representation on various committees including the Victorian Animal Welfare Advisory Committee, Institutional Animal Ethics committees, and on the Advisory Committee of the Animal Welfare Science Centre.

Oogjes was one of the instigators of the Australian Animal Welfare Strategy and represents animal advocacy groups on the Australian Animal Welfare Advisory Committee which provides animal welfare advice to the Federal and State Australian Agriculture Ministers.

=== Lyn White AM—Campaign Director and Investigator ===
Formerly a South Australian police officer, Lyn White served as Australian Director of the Animals Asia Foundation on Southeast Asia animal cruelty issues before joining Animals Australia in 2003. Since 2003, White has conducted numerous investigations in the Middle East and Indonesia into the treatment of live exported animals from Australia.

Evidence gathered has resulted in a leading live export company being prosecuted for animal cruelty and three 60 Minutes and three 7.30 Report segments highlighting brutal treatment of exported Australian animals. White 's January 2006 investigation in Egypt resulted in the Australian Federal Government suspending the live cattle trade to Egypt. In Jordan, White has assisted H.R.H. Princess Alia bint Al Hussein to achieve animal welfare breakthroughs in the country and acts as Chief Advisor to the Princess Alia Foundation. In 2011, footage obtained by White and a co-investigator in 11 Indonesian slaughterhouses processing Australian cattle was featured on ABC's Four Corners program. The resulting story led to the suspension of live exports to Indonesia and unprecedented public and political pressure to end the trade.

White was a state finalist for the 2012 Australian of the Year awards, and was named 2nd in a list of Melbourne's 100 most influential people of 2011 by The Age Melbourne Magazine. She was made a Member of the Order of Australia (AM) in the 2014 Queen's Birthday Honours for "significant service to the community as an animal rights and welfare advocate". She has been described by bioethicist and author of Animal Liberation, Peter Singer, as the most effective animal campaigner of his generation.

== Animal Charity Evaluators review ==
Animals Australia has been one of Animal Charity Evaluators' (ACE) Standout Charities in its annual recommendations since December 2015. ACE designates as Standout Charities those organizations which they do not feel are as strong as their Top Charities, but which excel in at least one way and are exceptionally strong compared to animal charities in general.

In its December 2015 review of Animals Australia, ACE cites Animals Australia's strengths as their "ability to steer public conversation in Australia in a more animal friendly direction", concrete successes such as getting McDonald's to phase out battery eggs, a self-critical mindset, and significant growth in recent years. Their weaknesses, according to ACE, include significant spending to help much smaller populations of animals (e.g. those used in live export or puppy farming, as opposed to animal agriculture), and the fact that its activities are largely confined to Australia.

Note in the latest review (November 2018) Animals Australia declined to be reviewed stating that they were too busy.

== See also ==
- Animal welfare and rights in Australia
