= Swissveg =

Association for vegetarians and vegans

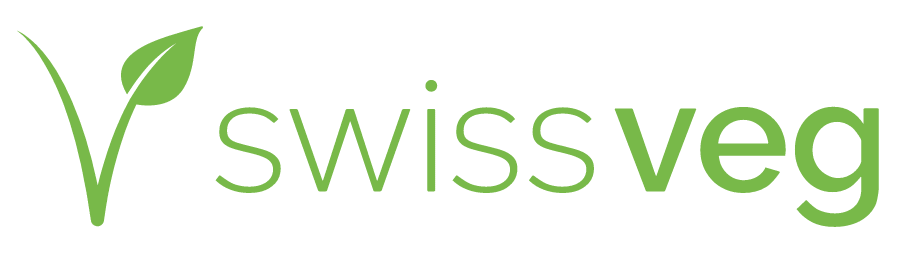
- Predecessor: Swiss Reform Youth
- Formation: August 1993, 08; 33 years ago
- Founders: Renato Pichler, Andreas Läuffer
- Purpose: Promotion of veganism and vegetarianism
- Location: Winterthur, Switzerland
- Region served: Switzerland
- President and Managing Director: Renato Pichler
- Vice-president: Marco Eberhard
- Deputy Managing Director: Marcel Bohnet
- Head of V-Label department: Lubo Yotov
- Website: www.swissveg.ch
- Formerly called: Swiss Association for Vegetarianism

Swissveg, previously known as the Swiss Association for Vegetarianism (German: Schweizerische Vereinigung für Vegetarismus, SVV), is a Swiss association in the legal context of article 60ff of the Swiss civil code (SCC). Swissveg runs campaigns, organizes events with the goal to reduce the consumption of animal products.

== Organisation ==
The association has its registered office in Winterthur. The president is Renato Pichler, who is also on the board of EVU.

Swissveg is the biggest community in Switzerland for vegetarians and vegans.

== History ==
The association was founded on 8 August 1993 in Sennwald under the name of Schweizerische Vereinigung für Vegetarismus (SVV). On 3 March 2014 the name of the association was changed to Swissveg.

The association is an active member of the EVU and the International Vegetarian Union. It is also associated with the organisation ProVeg in Germany.

== V-Label ==
Swissveg has, together with the EVU, developed the V-Label. They control which products and services can use this label within Switzerland. Products with the V-label are available at all major groceries in Switzerland: For example in Migros, Coop (Switzerland). and Lidl. About 350 Swiss companies use the V-Label.

== Events ==
A tour around the 2016 edition of Veganmania in Aarau

Swissveg annually organises several events, including vegetarian and vegan festivals. Veganmanias have been held since 2011. The 2016 edition in Aarau attracted 5,000 visitors, making it the largest of all vegan festivals in Switzerland. Previous editions were held in Winterthur, but due to a lack of space to accommodate the attendees, the organisation chose to move the festival to Aarau. In Gossau, St. Gallen, Veganmania was held first in 2017, then featuring 60 stands.

Day/Date	Title
Everyday	Meat-free day
Monday	Meatless Monday
Thursday	Vegi-Tag
September 5	Veganmania (Winterthur)
June 25	Veganmania (Aarau)
November 1	World Vegan Day
October 1	World Vegetarian Day

== See also ==
- List of vegetarian and vegan organizations
- Vegetarianism by country
