= Veganmania =

Series of annual vegan festivals

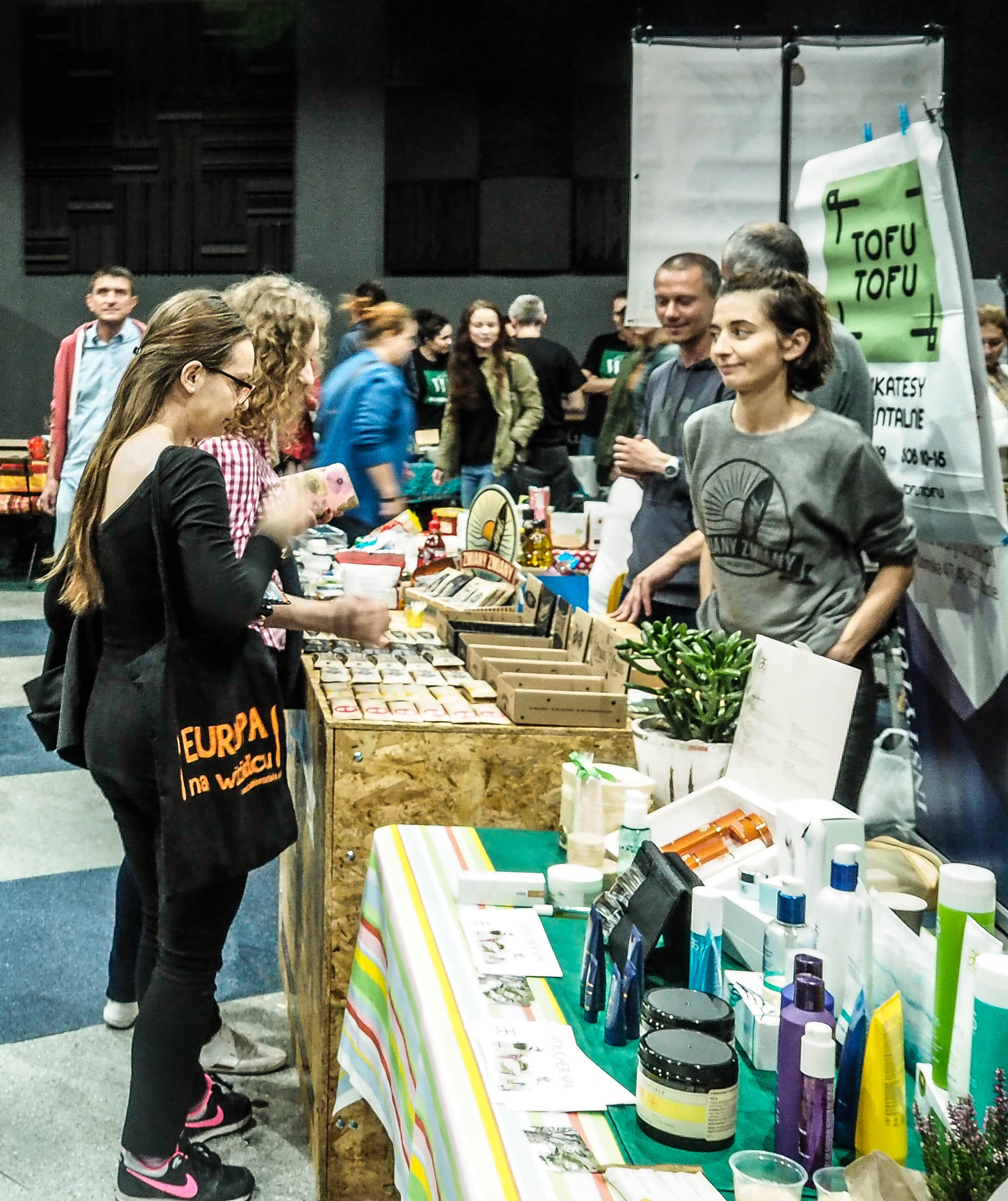
Vendors at a Veganmania festival in Opole in 2016

A tour around the first Veganmania Poznań in 2014 (in Polish)

Veganmanias are annual vegan festivals held in numerous locations around the world.

== Locations ==
These festivals take place in the following cities:

- Austria: Bregenz, Graz, Innsbruck, Linz, Vienna
- Croatia: Zagreb, officially known as the ZeGeVege Festival, held annually since 2008, organised by Prijatelji životinja ('Animal Friends')
- Germany: Augsburg, Iserlohn, Munich, Schweinfurt, Regensburg, Rosenheim, Würzburg
- Poland: Gdańsk, Katowice, Kraków, Łódź, Lublin, Opole, Poznań, Warsaw, Wrocław. The Polish events are organised by the Otwarte Klatki (Open Cages) association.
- Switzerland: Aarau (since 2011, before 2016 in Winterthur), Gossau, St. Gallen (since 2017)
- United States: Chicago

== Editions ==
A tour around the 2016 edition of Veganmania in Aarau (in German)

In 2014, the festival in Vienna built the biggest vegan fried egg.

Veganmania festivals in Switzerland have been organised by Swissveg since 2011. The 2016 edition of Veganmania Aarau attracted 5,000 visitors, making it the largest of all vegan festivals in Switzerland. Previous editions were held in Winterthur, but due to a lack of space to accommodate the attendees, the organisation chose to move the festival to Aarau. The Gossau Veganmania, also organised by Swissveg, was held first in 2017, then featuring 60 stands.

Veganmania in Poland has been more than eight major cities, with the 2019 Łódź edition attracting over 3,000 visitors. The 2020 Łódź edition had to be cancelled due to the coronavirus pandemic.

== See also ==
- Animal rights
- European Vegetarian Union
- International Vegetarian Union
- List of food days
- List of vegetarian and vegan festivals
- Veganism
- VeggieWorld
- World Vegan Day
- World Vegetarian Day
