= Alan Desmond =

Irish gastroenterologist

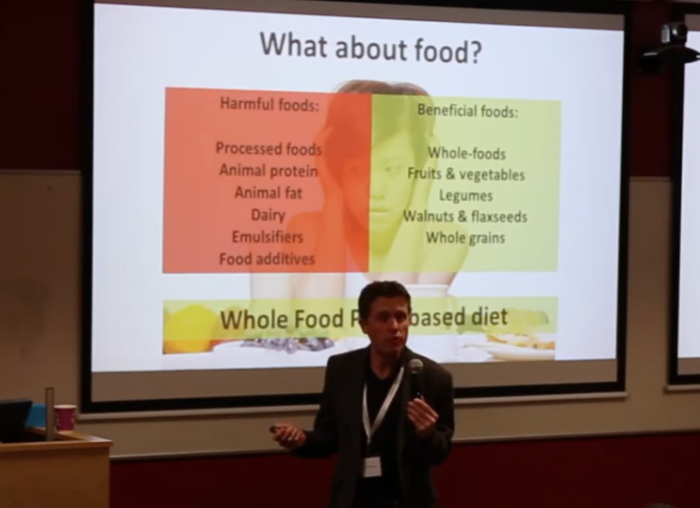
- Occupation(s): Gastroenterologist, writer

Alan Desmond is an Irish consultant gastroenterologist and writer known for his advocacy of plant-based nutrition. He has argued that a whole food plant-based diet may prevent many diseases.

== Career ==
Desmond studied at the School of Medicine of University College Cork and at John Radcliffe Hospital in Oxford. He moved to Devon in 2012. He is certified in gastroenterology and general internal medicine. He is a consultant gastroenterologist for the South Devon Healthcare NHS Foundation Trust. He works at the Devon Gut Clinic in Mount Stuart Hospital, Torquay and specializes in inflammatory bowel disease.

In 2021, Desmond authored The Plant-Based Diet Revolution which advocates a high-fibre whole food plant-based diet. According to Desmond "there is science showing us that individuals who consume a plant-based diet get tremendous gut microbial benefits and this may be some of the key reasons why people who eat a plant-based diet have lower risk of heart disease, stroke, colorectal cancer and numerous other diseases including Type 2 diabetes." He recommends a whole-food plant-based diet, focused on fruit and vegetables, whole grains, legumes, nuts and seeds.

Desmond is a Fellow of the Royal College of Physicians and member of the Royal College of Physicians of Ireland. He was a speaker at Vegfest 2019. He has written for The Telegraph.

He is an Ambassador of Plant-Based Health Professionals UK.

== Selected publications ==
- The Plant-Based Diet Revolution: 28 Days to a Happier Gut and a Healthier You (2021)
