= Blatner =

Blatner is a surname of German origin. Notable people with this surname include:

- Adam Blatner (1937–2021), American psychiatrist
- David Blatner (born 1966), American technology writer
- Dawn Jackson Blatner, American nutritionist
- Henry L. Blatner (1911–1978), American architect

== See also ==
- Blattner
