= Flexitarianism =

Diet of reduced meat consumption

A flexitarian diet, also called a semi-vegetarian diet, is one that is centered on plant-based foods with limited consumption of meat and other animal products. People who follow a flexitarian diet often reduce their intake of meat and animal products while increasing consumption of other plant-based food groups such as fruits, vegetables, and whole-grains. People adopt flexitarian diets for a variety of reasons, including health, environmental, ethical, and economic considerations.

== Definitions ==
Flexitarianism generally refers to a diet that consists most prominently of plant-based foods while allowing occasional consumption of meat or other animal products. Definitions of flexitarianism vary across countries, reflecting differences in cultural eating patterns. International research explains that flexitarianism is used as a broader term to describe partial reductions in meat consumption without fixed requirements. According to the Dutch environmental organization Natuur & Milieu, a flexitarian eats no meat, fish, or lunch meat for at least one day a week. The Dutch research agency I&O Research calls people flexitarian when they do not eat meat one or more days a week. The Dutch food health authority, Voedingscentrum states that flexitarians do not eat meat (but can eat fish) three or more days a week in between or with a hot meal.

Flexitarianism is a relatively new term that gained a considerable increase in usage in both science and public sectors in the 2010s. Flexitarian was listed in the mainstream Merriam-Webster's Collegiate Dictionary in 2012. In 2003, the American Dialect Society voted flexitarian as the year's most useful word.

The term is also used more generally for any type of animal-product reduction without complete abstinence, such as abstaining from the meat of certain species while retaining that of others. Vegetarianism is the practice of not consuming meat or any other animal tissue. Other neologisms used as synonyms for semi-vegetarianism are demi-vegetarianism, reducetarianism, and semi-veganism. Since definitions of flexitarianism widely vary across studies, researchers often focus on broader patterns of meat reduction rather than strict classifications.

== Prevalence and trends ==
Research and surveys suggest that meat reduction is becoming increasingly common in multiple countries, using flexitarianism to describe these patterns. Research from 2015 and 2016 reported that over half (55%) of Dutch people were flexitarians. According to research by Wageningen University & Research, the number of Dutch people who call themselves flexitarians increased from 14% in 2011 to 43% in 2019. However, the number of days that self-proclaimed flexitarians ate meat increased over that period from 2.9 days a week to 3.7 days. The researchers suspected that this was mainly due to the inflation of this term among the Dutch. Estimates often vary across studies due to the different interpretations people have of flexitarianism.

Separate studies have also reported major declines in daily meat consumption from Dutch people between 2010 and 2012. According to a study by Dutch research agency Motivaction at the beginning of June 2012, reducing meat consumption is a conscious choice for 35% of the Dutch. 14.8% of the population ate meat no more than one or two days a week. In Flanders, 1 in 6 people in 2013 do not eat meat one or more days a week.

A 2018 study estimated that the amount of UK consumers following a "meat-free diet" had increased to 12%, including 6% vegetarians, 4% pescetarians and 2% vegans. A 2018 poll indicated that 10% of adult Canadians considered themselves as vegetarians or vegans, among whom 42% were young adults.

Studies of flexitarian dietary patterns have also been researched in Australia and parts of Asia, though currency estimates differ greatly depending on survey methods and definitions. Along with increasing frequency, researchers have also studied the motivations that lead people to reduce meat consumption.

== Motivations ==
=== Health-related motivations ===
Some health-related reasons for adopting a flexitarian diet include weight management, efforts to create a more balanced and healthy diet, as well as general health consciousness. Meat reduction is often practiced as part of efforts to improve diet quality and support long-term health goals. Flexitarian diets are also sometimes described as an easier way to follow a mostly plant-based pattern while still allowing occasional meat. Flexitarians are often also motivated by recommendations from public health guidance to limit intake of red meat due to its possible correlation with heart disease, cancer, and diabetes.

=== Environmental motivations ===
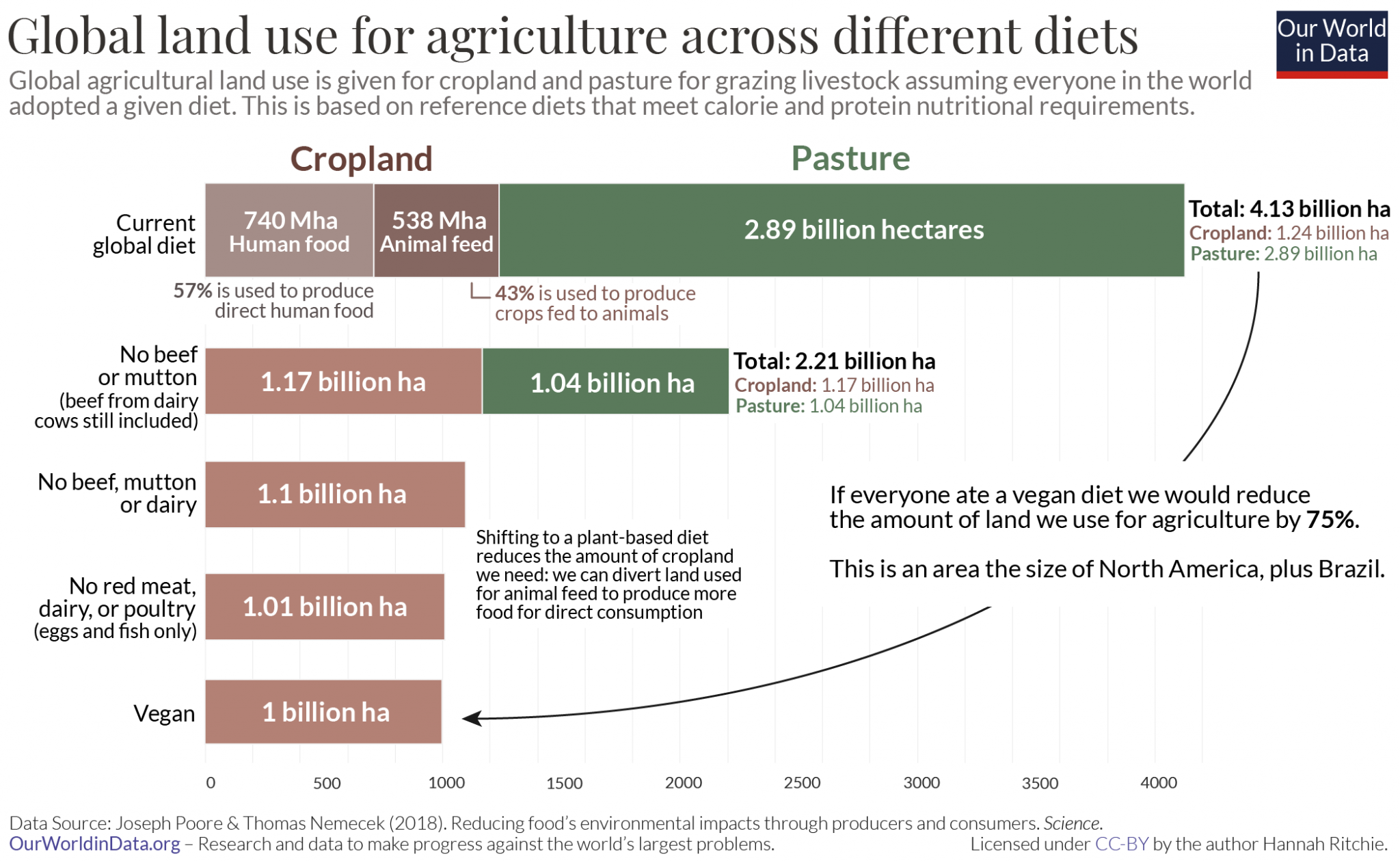
The amount of globally needed agricultural land would be reduced by almost half if no beef or mutton were eaten.

Some environmental reasons for adopting a flexitarian diet include concerns about excessive resource use and sustainability in the process of meat production. The process of meat production also includes high water and land use requirements, which have been noted as reasons for reducing meat consumption with environmental motivations. Reducing meat consumption is discussed in the context of environmental vegetarianism as well as efforts to lower the environmental footprint of food systems. There are often concerns about climate change that are tied to meat production. Climate change is connected to greenhouse gas emissions that are associated with livestock production.

=== Ethical and economic motivations ===
Some ethical and economic reasons for adopting a flexitarian diet include religious dietary restrictions, concern for animal welfare or animal rights, and humanitarian considerations. Individuals reduce meat consumption in order to limit resource use or for reasons associated with economic vegetarianism. Flexitarian diets are often discussed as a way to align everyday food choices with concerns that are related to animal welfare and social responsibility.

== Health effects ==
Flexitarian diets have been studied for their potential health and nutritional effects, though results do seem to vary due to the extremity of each individual's diet. Some studies have found a correlation between the flexitarian diet patterns and health benefits, especially in diets where foods such as fruits, vegetables, and grains are prominent. Research also explains a potential link between the reduction of meat consumption, especially red meats, and lower risks of certain chronic conditions, including type 2 diabetes, and cardiovascular disease. However, understanding research on flexitarian diets can be challenging because definitions vary widely across studies.

== Limitations ==
There are limitations when it comes to research on flexitarian diets that are related to variation in definitions, and dietary practices. A major limitation of research on flexitarian diets, is the variety in the consumption of meat across individuals. Different studies often have different criteria that classifies individuals as flexitarian. The variable can range from occasional meat reduction to a certain numbers of plant-based days. As a result, different studies can be difficult to compare, meaning that the frequency and health outcomes may vary depending on how flexitarianism is defined.

Another limitation with research on flexitarian diets is that a large amount of the research studying the correlation between health or environmental effects and flexitarian diets is based on observational studies instead of long-term controlled trials. While these studies are definitely useful for identifying certain patterns and potential impacts, they cannot officially establish direct relationships and may rely on assumptions and bias that can vary across studies.

Nutritional outcomes linked with flexitarian diets may also differ depending on different food choices and dietary planning. Flexitarian diets that are poorly planned may result in nutrient deficiencies, while diets that are well planned can meet the general nutritional recommendations. This makes it difficult to generalize the health outcomes across all flexitarian populations as no two diets are directly the same.

== Varieties ==
The main fundamental of some specific flexitarian diets is about the inflexible adherence to a diet that omits multiple classes and types of animals from the diet in entirety, rather than a sole focus on reduction in consumption frequency. Some examples include:

- Mediterranean Diet: This is a dietary pattern that is predominately plant based and prioritizes vegetables, fruit, whole grains, and olive oil and permits a moderate consumption of fish, poultry, dairy, and eggs while strictly limiting or entirely omitting red meat, added sugar, saturated fats, and ultra-processed foods.
- DASH Diet: This dietary framework was designed to combat hypertension that emphasizes vegetables, fruits, whole grains, and low-fat dairy with a small amount of poultry and fish while restrict the intake of foods high in sugar, salt, and saturated fat.
- EAT-Lancet Diet: This dietary model is designed to promote longevity, reduce the changes of chronic illnesses, and enhance environmental sustainability. The framework emphasizes a high intake of vegetables, fruit, whole grains, legumes, nuts, and seeds, ensuring a substantial portion of daily protein is derived from plant food. It permits a moderate consumption of poultry, fish, dairy, and eggs, a minimum amount of unprocessed red meat, and strictly limits or entirely eliminates processed meats. The diet emphasizes consuming unsaturated fat from plant oils over saturated fat sources like butter and coconut oil. By establishing specific serving sizes for each food group, this framework is designed to be adapt across different diets, lifestyles, and cultures, including omnivorous, flexitarian, vegetarian, and herbivorous, though it explicitly excludes a strictly carnivorous diet.
- Pescetarian: The dietary practice of consuming fish and/or shellfish and may or may not consume dairy and eggs. The consumption of other meat, such as poultry, mammal meat, and the flesh of other land-dwelling animals is abstained from. Historically, some vegetarian societies considered it to be a less-strict type of vegetarianism.
- Pollotarian Diet: This dietary pattern includes chicken and/or other poultry and usually eggs as well. A pollotarian would not consume seafood or the meat from mammals or other animals, often for environmental, health or food justice reasons.
- Macrobiotic Diet: This plant-based diet that may include occasional fish or other seafood. Cereals, especially brown rice, are the staples of the macrobiotic diet, supplemented by small amounts of vegetables and occasionally fish. Advocates of the macrobiotic diet often promote a vegetarian (or nearly vegan) approach as the ideal.

== Dietary pattern ==
All semi-vegetarians could accurately be described as people who eat a plant-based diet, but there is no firm consensus how infrequently someone would have to eat meat and fish for their diet to be considered a flexitarian diet rather than a regular plant-based diet. Recurring conditions of a flexitarian include consuming red meat or poultry only once a week. One study defined semi-vegetarians as consuming meat or fish three days a week. Occasionally, researchers define semi-vegetarianism as eschewing red meat in entirety and flexitarianism as the distinct practice of eating very little meat. Semi-vegetarianism/flexitarianism may be the default diet for much of the world, where meals based on plant materials provide the bulk of people's regular energy intake. In many countries, this is often due to financial barriers as higher incomes are associated with diets rich in animal and dairy proteins rather than carbohydrate based staples. One estimate suggests that 14% of the global population is flexitarian.

== Society and culture ==
Flexitarianism has been discussed in public and media conversations about food choice and consumer behavior. This concept is often presented as a more flexible version of vegetarian or vegan diets, which may explain its frequent appearance in lifestyle discussions. In the United Kingdom, there was increased demand for vegan products in 2018, which reflects the interest in shifting to meat-reducing diets.

== Environmental impact ==
Flexitarian dietary patterns have been analyzed and research has started to point to a relation to positive environmental impacts, especially compared to diets that are high in red meat. Studies have suggested that dietary patterns that involve reduced consumption of red meat, including flexitarian diets, are associated with lower greenhouse gas emissions compared to typical diets. The environmental impact of diets high in red meat is mainly credited to the intensity of livestock production, which requires a large amount of land, food, and water. Compared with fully plant-based diets, flexitarian patterns result in smaller environmental benefits but represent a much more achievable reduction strategy for many populations.

In 2019, researchers associated with the EAT-Lancet Commission argued that dietary patterns that reduced consumption of animal products, could support environmental sustainability while also meeting global nutritional needs when compared with typical Western diets. However, much of this data is based on modeling analyses, and environmental outcomes could possibly vary depending on each flexitarian's diet.

== See also ==
- Meat-free days
- Meatless Monday
- Dawn Jackson Blatner
- Reducetarian Foundation
