= Relational disorder =

Relational disorders involve two or more individuals and a disordered "juncture", whereas typical Axis I psychopathology describes a disorder at the individual level. According to Michael First who was on the DSM-5 working committee the focus of a relational disorder "is on the relationship rather than on any one individual in the relationship".

For example, if a parent is withdrawn from one child but not another, the dysfunction could be attributed to a relational disorder. In contrast, if a parent is withdrawn from both children, the dysfunction may be more appropriately attributable to a disorder at the individual level.

First states that "relational disorders share many elements in common with other disorders: there are distinctive features for classification; they can cause clinically significant impairment; there are recognizable clinical courses and patterns of comorbidity; they respond to specific treatments; and they can be prevented with early interventions. Specific tasks in a proposed research agenda: develop assessment modules; determine the clinical utility of relational disorders; determine the role of relational disorders in the etiology and maintenance of individual disorders; and consider aspects of relational disorders that might be modulated by individual disorders."

The DSM-5, published in 2011, defines a relational disorder as "persistent and painful patterns of feelings, behaviors, and perceptions involving two or more partners in an important personal relationship."

Tasman's Psychiatry (5th Edition), published later in 2024, gives a similar definition, "A relational problem [disorder] is a situation in which two or more emotionally attached individuals (e.g., family members, romantic partners) engage in communication or behavior patterns that are destructive, unsatisfying, or both, to one or more of the individuals."

== History ==
The idea of a psychology of relational disorders is far from new. According to Adam Blatner, MD, some of the early psychoanalysts alluded to it more or less directly, and the history of marital couple therapy began with a few pioneers in 1930s. J.L. Moreno, the inventor of psychodrama and a major pioneer of group psychotherapy and social psychology, noted the idea that relationships could be "sick" even if the people involved were otherwise "healthy," and even vice versa: Otherwise "sick" people could find themselves in a mutually supportive and "healthy" relationship.

Moreno's ideas may have influenced some of the pioneers of family therapy. However, family therapy also stems from developments in general science, namely the fields in broader psychology and cybernetic theory. Cybernetics developed in the mid-1940s, and noting the nature of circularity and feedback in complex systems. By the 1950s, the idea that relationships themselves could be problematic became quite apparent. In this context, "relational disorder" not necessarily referring to a disease or mental disorder, but instead difficulties within relationships that require assessment or intervention. The idea of a relational disorder is not a novel notion by any means.

== Kinds ==
The majority of research on relational disorders concerns three relationship systems: adult children and their parents, minor children and their parents, and the marital relationship. There is also an increasing body of research on problems in dyadic gay relationships and on problematic sibling relationships.

=== Marital ===
Marital disorders are divided into "Marital Conflict Disorder Without Violence" and "Marital Abuse Disorder (Marital Conflict Disorder With Violence)." Couples with marital disorders sometimes come to clinical attention because the couple recognize long-standing dissatisfaction with their marriage and come to the clinician on their own initiative or are referred by a health care professional. Secondly, there is serious violence in the marriage which is "usually the husband battering the wife". In these cases the emergency room or a legal authority often is the first to notify the clinician.

Most importantly, marital violence "is a major risk factor for serious injury and even death and women in violent marriages are at much greater risk of being seriously injured or killed" (National Advisory Council on Violence Against Women 2000). The authors of this study add that "There is current considerable controversy over whether male-to-female marital violence is best regarded as a reflection of male psychopathology and control or whether there is an empirical base and clinical utility for conceptualizing these patterns as relational."

Recommendations for clinicians making a diagnosis of "Marital Relational Disorder" should include the assessment of actual or "potential" male violence as regularly as they assess the potential for suicide in depressed patients. Further, "clinicians should not relax their vigilance after a battered wife leaves her husband, because some data suggest that the period immediately following a marital separation is the period of greatest risk for the women.

Many men will stalk and batter their wives in an effort to get them to return or punish them for leaving. Initial assessments of the potential for violence in a marriage can be supplemented by standardized interviews and questionnaires, which have been reliable and valid aids in exploring marital violence more systematically."

The authors conclude with what they call "very recent information" on the course of violent marriages which suggests that "over time a husband's battering may abate somewhat, but perhaps because he has successfully intimidated his wife."

The risk of violence remains strong in a marriage in which it has been a feature in the past. Thus, treatment is essential here; the clinician cannot just wait and watch. The most urgent clinical priority is the protection of the wife because she is the one most frequently at risk, and clinicians must be aware that supporting assertiveness by a battered wife may lead to more beatings or even death.

In some cases, men are abuse victims of their wives; there is not exclusively male-on-female physical violence, although this is more common than female-on-male violence.

=== Parent–child abuse ===
Research on parent–child abuse bears similarities to that on marital violence, with the defining characteristic of the disorder being physical aggression by a parent toward a child. The disorder is frequently concealed by parent and child, but may come to the attention of the clinician in several ways, from emergency room medical staff to reports from child protection services.

Some features of abusive parent–child relationships that serve as a starting point for classification include: (a) the parent is physically aggressive with a child, often producing physical injury, (b) parent–child interaction is coercive, and parents are quick to react to provocations with aggressive responses, and children often reciprocate aggression, (c) parents do not respond effectively to positive or prosocial behavior in the child, (d) parents do not engage in discussion about emotions, (e) parent engages in deficient play behavior, ignores the child, rarely initiates play, and does little teaching, (f) children are insecurely attached and, where mothers have a history of physical abuse, show distinctive patterns of disorganized attachment, and (g) parents relationship shows coercive marital interaction patterns.

Defining the relational aspects of these disorders can have important consequences. For example, in the case of early appearing feeding disorders, attention to relational problems may help delineate different types of clinical problems within an otherwise broad category. In the case of conduct disorder, the relational problems may be so central to the maintenance, if not the etiology, of the disorder that effective treatment may be impossible without recognizing and delineating it.

== See also ==
- Classification of mental disorders
- DSM-IV Codes
- Relational psychoanalysis
- Relationship counseling
- Social psychiatry
- Social psychology (psychology)
- Social psychology (sociology)
