= International Vegetarian Week =

- Genre: Campaign
- Date: First week of October
- Frequency: Annually
- Country: International
- Major events: Promoting living as vegetarians
- Sponsor: International Vegetarian Union (IVU) and its member organizations and supporters

The International Vegetarian Week (IVW) consists of 7 days, October 1 to 7, where many events promoting the vegetarian lifestyle take place in several nations of the world. This annual week begins with World Vegetarian Day (October 1), which has been endorsed since 1977 by the International Vegetarian Union (IVU), which is headquartered in the U.K.

Many countries and organisations have been proposing Vegetarian Weeks for several years, from Australia to the United Kingdom.

For many years, those Vegetarian Weeks have been mostly the effort of national organisations. The dates were different from country to country, and there was little or no international coordination or help.

In 2008, a team of activists from different countries, before and around the 38th IVU World Vegetarian Congress, decided to coordinate activities cross-nationally to promote an annual International Vegetarian Week from October 1 to 7. This working team set up a specific website, which serves both as a means of informing about the IVW and as a tool to share ideas, resources, and promotional materials (available on the internet and in print).

Vegetarian organisations and activists worldwide contribute materials and resources to the IVW, then the website serves as a central point to share the resources and ideas.

In 2008, the first IVW was promoted in about 13 countries worldwide. This number has steadily increased in following years. The project has received the public support of famous vegetarians, including John Robbins, Rajendra Pachauri, Jean Ziegler, and Elroy Finn.

== Historical notes ==
The period called International Vegetarian Week has for a long time been used as World Week of Prayer for Animals by religiously ethical vegetarians. Curiously, it covered the following three dates:

- first full week of October
- October 1–7, plus
- two full weekends, usually on either end (before or after) October 4, the Feast Day of St. Francis

However, though World Week of Prayer for Animals has overlapped and has been coterminous with the International Vegetarian Week, cultural, ideological, and political reasons often prevent its being noted in some (but not all) International Vegetarian Week announcements.

== See also ==
- List of food days
- List of vegetarian and vegan festivals
- List of vegetarian and vegan organizations
- Meat-free days
- World Vegan Day - November 1
- World Vegetarian Day - October 1
