= List of vegetarian and vegan festivals =

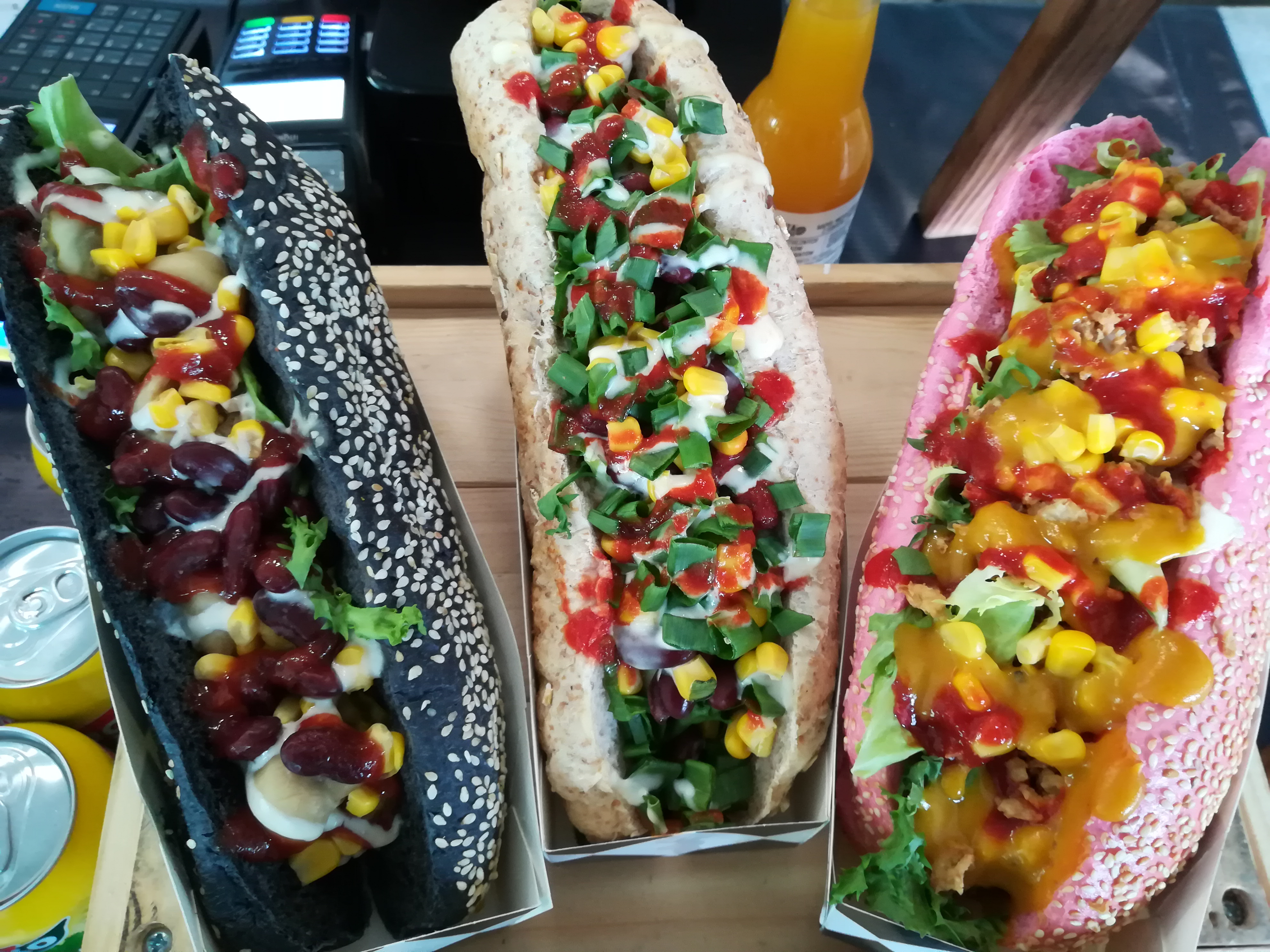
Vegetarian Culinary Festival in Poznań, Poland, 2019

This is a list of vegetarian and vegan festivals which are held around the world to promote veganism and/or vegetarianism among the public and to support and link individuals and organizations that practice, promote or endorse veganism or vegetarianism. Many of these events are also food festivals and/or music festivals and can also contain edutainment.

== List ==
=== International ===
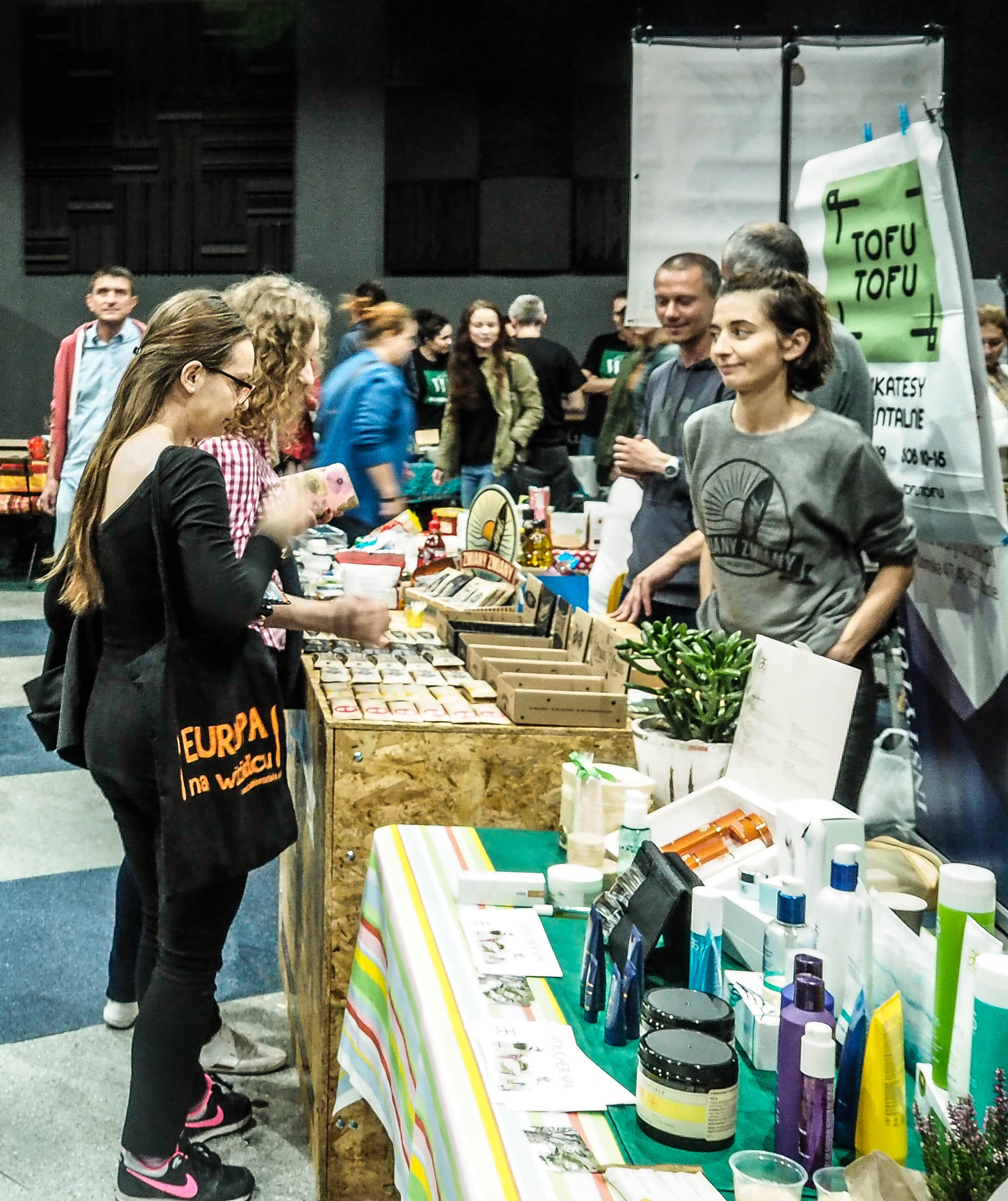
Vendors at a Veganmania festival in Opole in 2016

Some vegetarian and vegan festivals are held in many countries throughout the year:

- Veganmania
- VeggieWorld
- Veggie Pride

Many vegetarian or vegan festivals may call themselves 'VegFest', but these do not appear to have any international ties to each other.

=== Austria ===
In Austria, Veganmania festivals are held in:

- Graz
- Innsbruck
- Vienna (twice a year). The 2014 Vienna edition built the biggest vegan fried egg in the world.

=== Canada ===
- Toronto, Ontario. The Toronto Vegetarian Food Fair has been held in Toronto at the Harbourfront since 1985. Around 2005 it attracted 15,000 to 20,000 visitors a year.

=== Croatia ===
In Croatia, Veganmania festivals are held in:

- Zagreb. Officially known as the ZeGeVege Festival, held annually since 2008, organised by Prijatelji životinja ('Animal Friends').

=== Czech Republic ===
- Fluff Fest was an independent hardcore punk festival held each July in Rokycany, Czech Republic. It was fully vegan, with catering provided by local animal rights organization Svoboda zvířat.

=== France ===
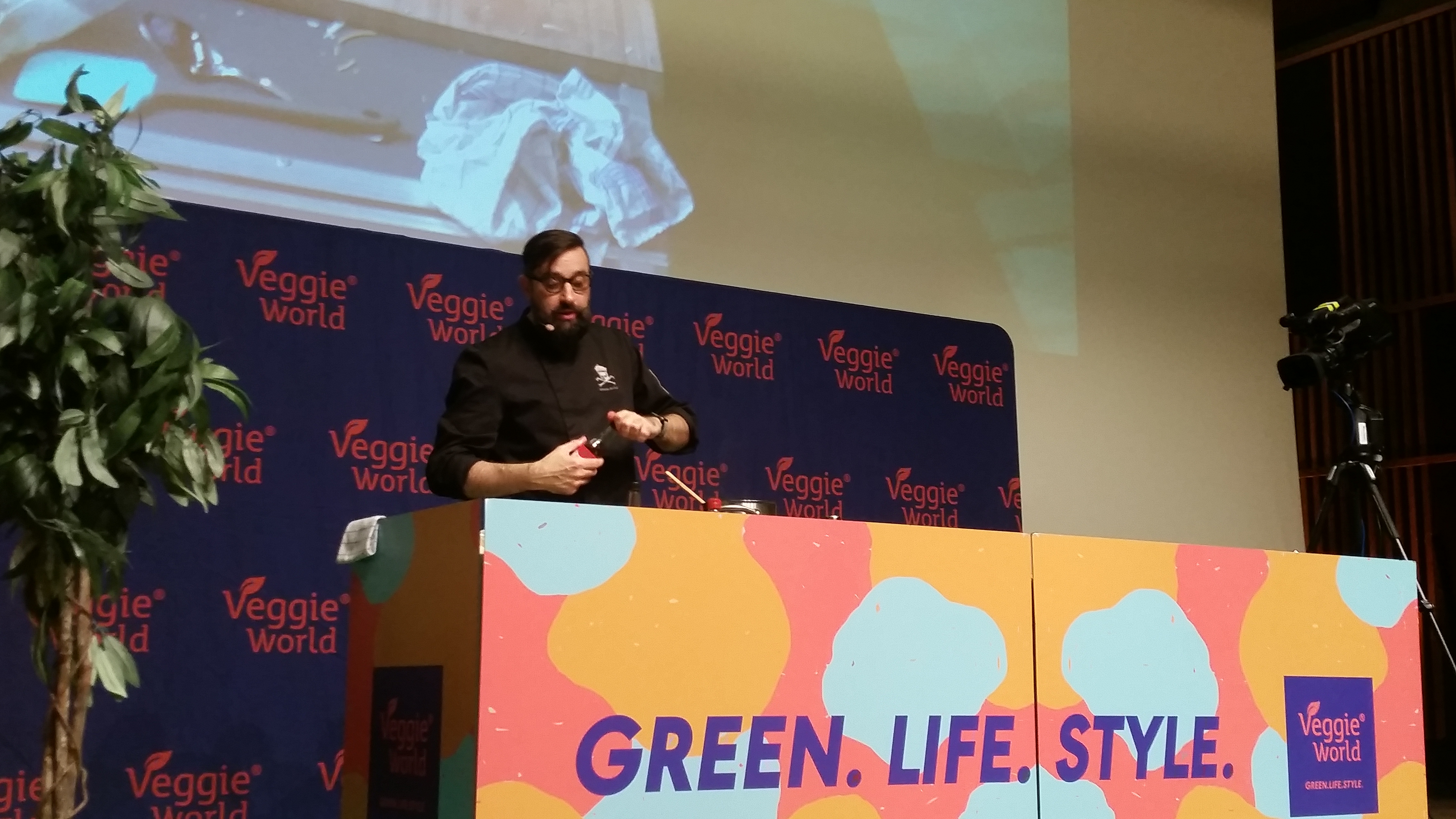
Live cooking demonstration at VeggieWorld Paris 2019

In France, VeggieWorld festivals are held in:

- Lyon. 3rd edition held in 2019.
- Paris. VeggieWorld Paris 2019 was the 7th Parisian edition and attracted over 8,000 visitors, which was 14% more than the 6th.

=== Germany ===
In Germany, Veganmania festivals are held in:

- Iserlohn
- Regensburg. The first event in 2014 has an attendance of around 5,000.
- Würzburg

VeggieWorld festivals are held in:

- Berlin. VeggieWorld Berlin was first held in 2015 with 55 stalls, which grew to 130 stalls in 2019. The 2019 edition saw 10,000 visitors.
- Düsseldorf. The fifth edition was held in 2019.
- Wiesbaden (2011–2020). VeggieWorld has been held annually in Wiesbaden from 2011 to 2020, with the last attracting 13,000 visitors. The next edition is scheduled to take place in 2021 in Frankfurt.

Other festivals:

- The Vegan Summerfest (German: Veganes Sommerfest) is a three-day vegan food festival that takes place on the Alexanderplatz in Berlin, co-organised by ProVeg International, Berlin Vegan and the Albert Schweitzer Foundation. The 2019 event featured around 100 information and selling stands.

=== India ===
- Aranmula Vallasadya

=== Netherlands ===
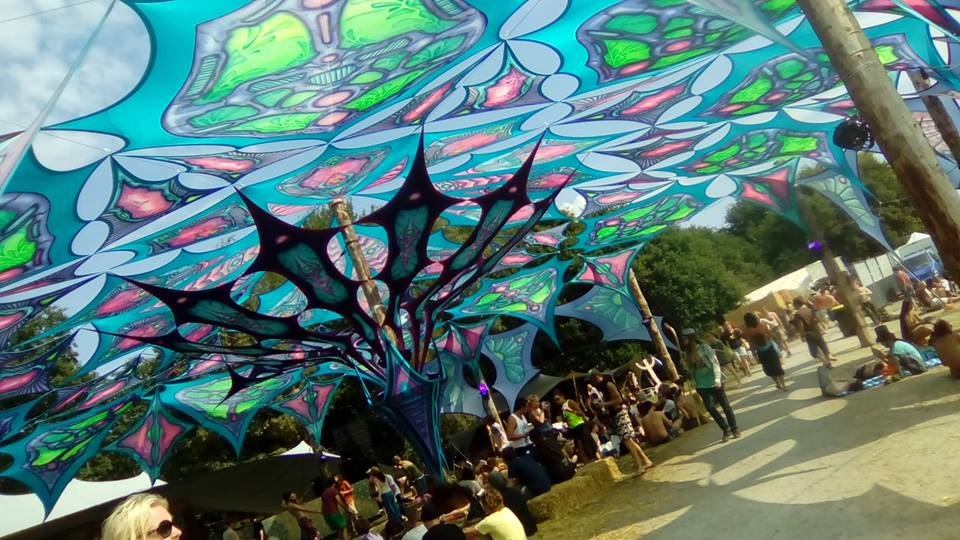
Psy-Fi in Leeuwarden, Netherlands

The following festivals in the Netherlands are focused on vegetarian and vegan food, community and activism:

- VeggieWorld in Utrecht, since 2016, vegan. The 2020 edition attracted 9,000 visitors.
- VegFest in Utrecht, since 2014, vegan

=== Philippines ===
Ever since around 2016, VegFest Pilipinas, was held in the Philippines as the country's first large vegan event, and was established to present alternatives to the country's more dominantly meat based food economy, which ever since has been held annually, and has been tagged as the biggest vegan festival in Asia.

=== Poland ===
The first edition of Veganmania held in Poznań, Poland, 2014

In Poland, the Otwarte Klatki ('Open Cages') association organises Veganmania festivals in several different cities. Veganmania in Poland has been held in eight major cities, with the 2019 Łódź edition attracting over 3,000 visitors.

=== Switzerland ===
A tour around the 2016 edition of Veganmania in Aarau

In Switzerland, Veganmania festivals are held in:

- Aarau. Veganmania in Switzerland has been organised by Swissveg since 2011. The 2016 edition attracted 5,000 visitors, making it the largest of all vegan festivals in Switzerland. Previous editions were held in Winterthur, but due to a lack of space to accommodate the attendees, the organisation chose to move the festival to Aarau.
- Gossau, St. Gallen. The Gossau Veganmania, organised by Swissveg, was held first in 2017, then featuring 60 stands.

=== Thailand ===
see Nine Emperor Gods Festival

=== United Kingdom ===
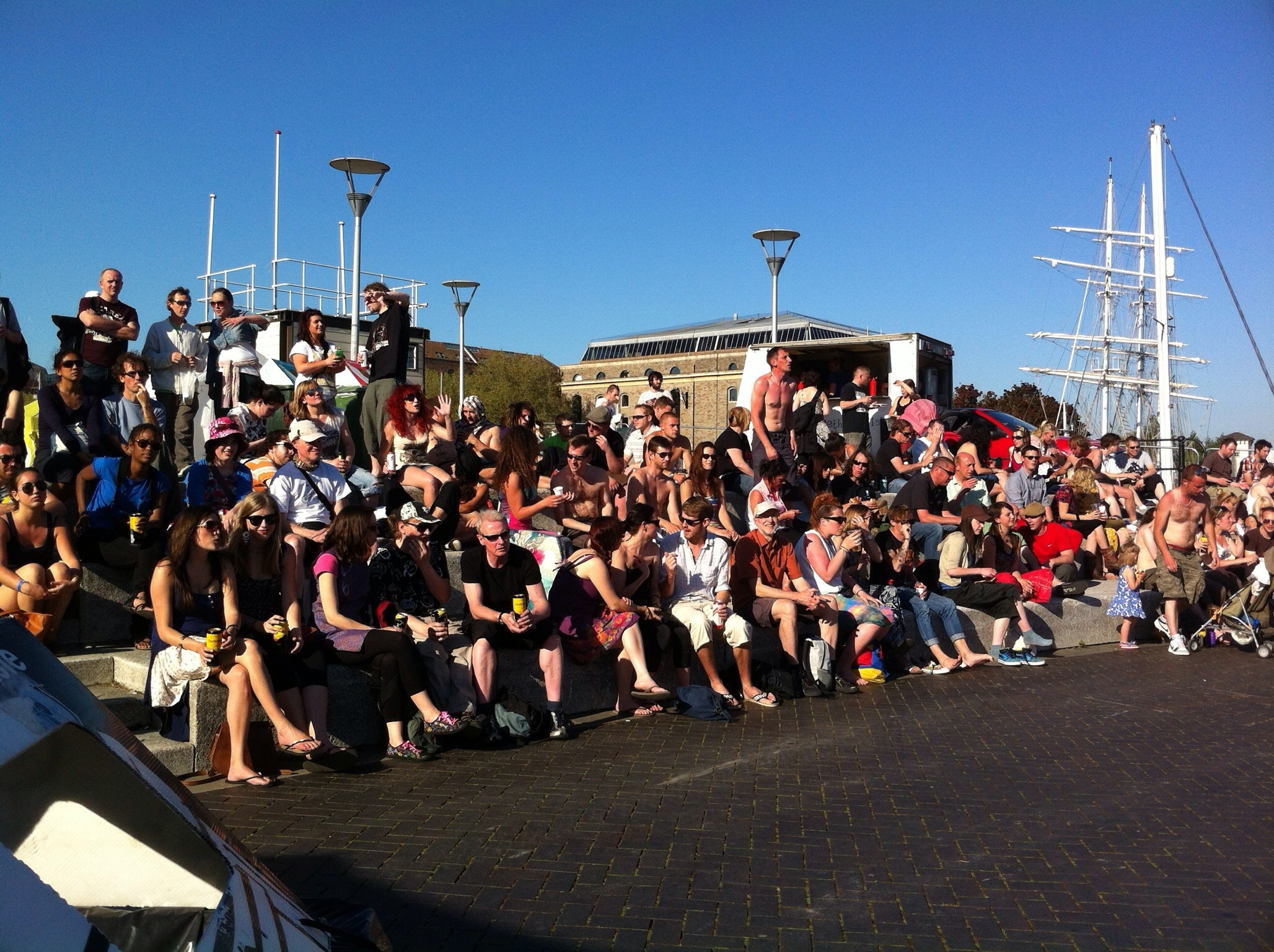
Audience at VegFest Bristol 2012

- Vegan Camp Out is an annual vegan food and camping festival which has been held in different locations in the UK since 2016.
- VegfestUK is an annual vegan food festival held each year in various cities, starting in 2013.

=== Spain ===
- Vegan Fest Catalunya

=== Greece ===
The Vegan Life Festival is the largest vegan event in Greece, organized by Vegan Life NGO. It was first held in Athens in 2016, expanding to Thessaloniki in 2017, and Chania in 2019. Around 35,000 visitors attended in Athens over two days, and around 38,000 in 2021. The festival includes talks, workshops, children's activities, and art exhibitions. Since 2024, the Vegan Life Festival operates under the auspices of the Municipality of Athens.

=== United States ===
- NAVS Vegan Summerfest, Johnstown, Pennsylvania. Held annually since 1974, and includes the Annual Vegetarian Hall of Fame induction announcement.

North American Vegetarian Society

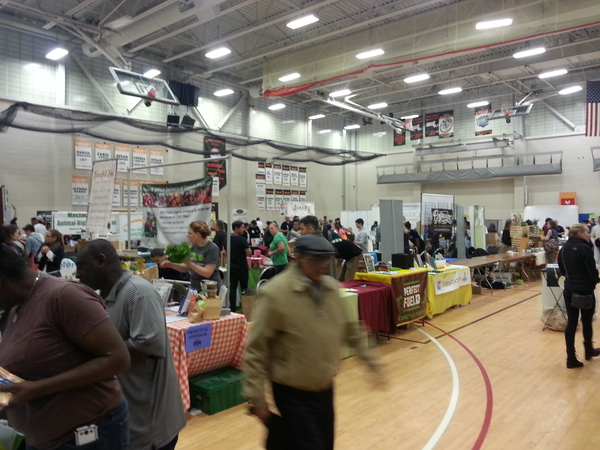
Boston Vegetarian Food Festival 2014

- Los Angeles, California. The Vegan Street Fair is held monthly in Westwood Village by 501(c)(3) nonprofit VSF Connects Inc.
- Boston, Massachusetts. The Boston Veg Food Fest is held annually in the autumn, at the Reggie Lewis Track and Athletic Center in Mission Hill, Boston, between mid-October and early November At 32 years, it is considered to be the oldest Veg Food Fest in the United States.
- Saint Paul, Minnesota. The Twin Cities VegFest is held annually in September
- San Francisco, California. World Vegan Festival is held annually in late October/early November
- South Bend, Indiana, and surroundings. Michiana VegFest is held annually in late April
- Lancaster, Pennsylvania. Lancaster VegFest is held annually in June
- Hamden, Connecticut. CompassionFest is held annually
- Charlottesville, Virginia. Cville VegFest is held annually in September

== See also ==
- American Vegan Society – publishes online list of vegan-oriented VegFests in US and Canada
- Animal rights
- Buddhist cuisine
- Buddhist vegetarianism
- Korean temple cuisine
- List of food days
- List of vegetarian and vegan companies
- List of vegetarian and vegan organizations
- Meat-free days
- Veganism
- Vegetarian week
- Vegetarianism by country
- World Vegan Day
- World Vegetarian Day
