= Reducetarian Foundation =

Nonprofit organization

- Reducetarian logo
- Formation: 2015
- Type: Non-profit
- President: Brian Kateman
- Website: reducetarian.org

The Reducetarian Foundation is a nonprofit organization that promotes a "reducetarian" diet, where participants reduce the amount of meat (as well as eggs and dairy) they consume in order to improve their health, protect the environment, and spare farmed animals from cruelty. Brian Kateman is the cofounder and president of the organization and one of the main proponents of the diet. He is skeptical of only using "all or nothing" messages like veganism and vegetarianism, believing that many people will be more excited about only partially reducing their animal product consumption.

== History ==
Kateman grew up eating meat. He was also very environmentally conscious. In 2010, he learned about philosopher Peter Singer and was deeply influenced by his views on animal welfare. Kateman proceeded to limit his meat consumption without being entirely vegetarian, but this caused confusion by his family and friends. In 2014, while at lunch with his friend Tyler Alterman (who was also eating a reduced-meat diet), the two came up with the term "reducetarian".

At first, Kateman thought he would launch a small project in New York to promote reducetarianism. His 2014 TEDx Talk and Indiegogo campaign received attention worldwide, sparking Kateman to take the idea farther than he initially intended. He went on to found the Reducetarian Foundation in 2015 in order to support other people who want to reduce their animal-product consumption. The non-profit does fundraisers, spreads awareness of the benefits of plant-based diets, and hosts an annual conference.

In 2017, Kateman published an essay collection entitled The Reducetarian Foundation. It included contributions from notable figures like Jeffrey Sachs, Noam Chomsky, and Richard Dawkins. The book includes tips on how to reduce one's meat consumption, reflections on how reducetarianism improved one's life, and advice to new members of the movement.

On May 20, 2017 the first Reducetarian Summit was held in New York. The summit featured speakers, workshops, and panels for its participants.

== Controversy ==
Some vegetarian and vegan groups do not approve of the reducetarianism movement, nor the Reducetarian Foundation for supporting it. Critics say that the movement allows "injustice" to persist and stops people from going the whole way to pure veganism. Kateman has called this criticism an example of narcissism of small difference.
