= Shireen Kassam =

British hematologist

- Born: 1975 (age 50–51)
- Occupation: Hematologist

Shireen Amirali Kassam (born 1975) is a British haematologist, lifestyle medicine physician and promoter of whole food plant-based nutrition. She is the founder of Plant-Based Health Professionals UK.

== Biography ==
Kassam qualified as a doctor in 2000. She obtained a PhD at the University of London in 2011 on the role of selenium in sensitizing cancer cells to chemotherapy. She became a member of the Royal College of Physicians in 2003 and a fellow of the Royal College of Pathologists in 2008.

Kassam is a Consultant Haematologist and Honorary Senior Lecturer at King's College Hospital. She is a visiting professor at University of Winchester where she developed the UK's first university course on plant-based nutrition. She is a certified lifestyle medicine physician.

Kassam founded Plant-Based Health Professionals UK in 2018, a non-profit organization that provides education on whole food plant-based nutrition for prevention and management of chronic disease. Kassam is on the Research Advisory Committee of the Vegan Society. She has co-authored Eating Plant-Based and the textbook Plant-Based Nutrition in Clinical Practice, published by Hammersmith Books in 2022. She is a council member of True Health Initiative.

In 2022, Kassam argued that the National Health Service would save billions if more people embraced a plant-based diet. She has written for Reader's Digest and The Independent.

== Personal life ==
Kassam has followed a whole food plant-based diet since 2013. She was a speaker at VegfestUK 2022.

== Selected publications ==
- Eating Plant-Based: Scientific Answers to Your Nutrition Questions (with Zahra Kassam, 2022)
- Plant-Based Nutrition in Clinical Practice (with Zahra Kassam and Lisa Simon, 2022)
