= Vegfest (UK) =

Annual vegan food festival in the UK

VegFestUK
- Genre: veganism
- Location: United Kingdom
- Years active: 2003–2018, 2021–
- Founders: Tim Barford
- Website: www.vegfest.co.uk

VegfestUK is an annual vegan food festival held each year in various cities including London, Brighton and Bristol, starting in 2013. The 2019 festival in London included around 370 stalls (230 stalls in Brighton in the same year). Vegfest is one of the biggest Vegan/Vegetarian festivals in the world, with 14,500 visitors at the 2018 London Vegfest (compared to on average 8,000 visitors at VeggieWorld.

== Bristol ==
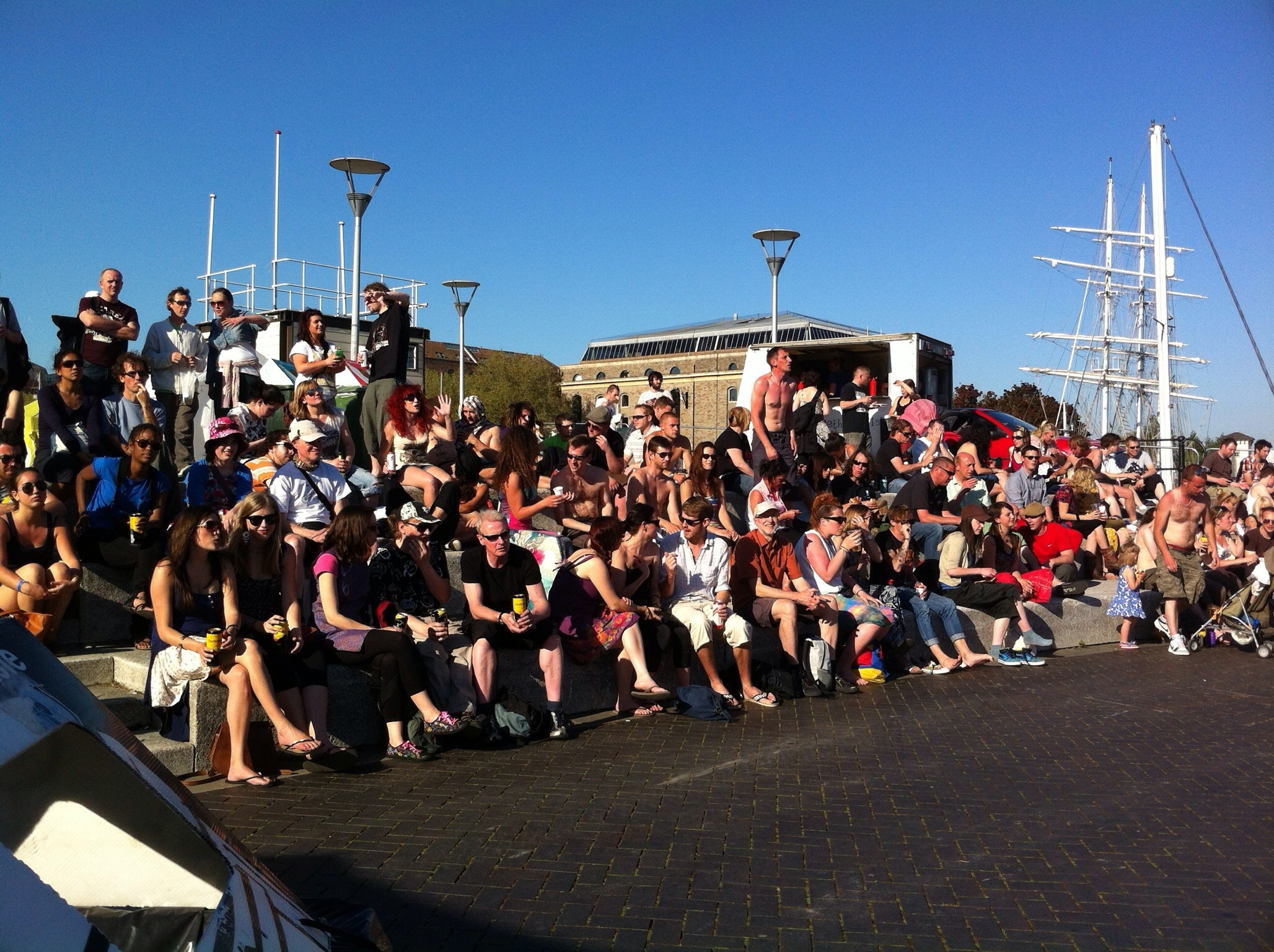
Audience at VegFest Bristol 2012

VegfestUK started life in Bristol in 2003 under the name Bristol Vegan Fayre, with the aim of showcasing the very best of a vegan lifestyle to the public. The organisers require all food and drinks supplied on site to be suitable for vegans. As well as a marketplace for the sampling, purchase and sale of vegan goods, the Bristol festivals also feature comedy, movies, chefs and cookery workshops, talks by nutritionists and campaigners, and children's entertainment during the day, followed by headline music in the evenings. Previous performers included Goldie Lookin' Chain, Ms. Dynamite and Finley Quaye.

In celebration of its 10th anniversary, the Bristol show in May 2013 featured headliners such as the Happy Mondays, Peter Hook, The Farm, Caravan Palace, the Abyssinians, Macka B and others in the evenings. The daytime event was visited by leading vegans such as Bristol MP Kerry McCarthy, marathon runner Fiona Oakes, ex-Everton player Neil Robinson (the world's first professional top-flight vegan footballer), cancer survivor and powerlifter Pat Reeves amongst other guests. A grand total of 20,000 people descended upon the sun-baked Bristol Harbourside for this 3-day mix of food and music. It's been on hiatus since 2019 & will return in 2021.

== Brighton ==
The Brighton event began in 2009, and since 2010 has taken place annually in March at the Hove Centre. In the wake of the horsemeat scandal, the 2013 show attracted an all-time record of 7,200 visitors over 2 days, with mainstream coverage by BBC Radio 2 and Juice FM, and visited by leading presenters Janey Lee Grace and Sarah Jane Honeywell (CBeebies), vegan football player Dean Howell (Fleetwood Town F.C.), comedian and actress Sara Pascoe, nutritionist Juliet Gellatley and other special guests. The latest additions included a speed-dating session and a bodybuilders' competition.

== London ==
In response to the rising popularity of meat-free products following the Horsemeat scandal and eco-friendly lifestyles over the years, VegfestUK organised London shows starting October 2013.

This indoor festival takes place annually in the West Halls of Kensington Olympia. The first show featured over 180 stalls - including Sir Paul McCartney's campaign group Meat Free Monday - and speakers and entertainers including comedians Dave Spikey, Michael Legge, Chris Stokes, Lucy Porter and Andrew O'Neill, musician Macka B, escapologist David Straitjacket, presenter Wendy Turner Webster, ultra-marathoner Scott Jurek, and strongman Patrik Baboumian.

VegfestUK also organises the annual VegfestUK awards, which is a public internet vote amongst nominated vegan products, services, organisations, and people. From 2013 onwards, VegfestUK London hosts the award ceremony.
