= Blattner =

Blattner is a surname of German origin. Notable people with the surname include:

- Buddy Blattner (1920–2009), American table tennis and baseball player
- Dustin Blattner (born 1986), American racing driver
- Frank Blattner (1890–1954), American baseball player
- Robert James Blattner (1931–2015), American mathematician
- Ludwig Blattner (1881–1935), German-British inventor, film producer and studio owner
- Gerry Blattner (1913–c. 1992), British film producer

== See also ==
- Blatner, alternate spelling of the name
