= Boston Vegetarian Society =

US educational organization

- Founded: 1986
- Type: Educational charity
- Tax ID no.: 04-3082813
- Registration no.: 043082813
- Purpose: Veganism, vegetarianism
- Location: P.O. Box 38-1071 Cambridge, MA 02238
- Region served: Eastern Massachusetts
- Services: Educational events and literature supporting vegan diets
- Method: Popular education
- Members: ^{[Figure needed]}
- Subsidiaries: None
- Revenue: As of September 2012 $52,434
- Endowment: As of September 2012 $127,324
- Employees: ^{[Figure needed]}
- Volunteers: ^{[Figure needed]}
- Website: www.bostonveg.org
- Affiliate member of North American Vegetarian Society (NAVS), Vegetarian Union of North America (VUNA), and International Vegetarian Union (IVU)

The Boston Vegetarian Society (BVS) is a non-profit educational organization based in Boston, Massachusetts, USA, with the purpose of promoting and supporting vegetarianism and veganism. It hosts monthly speaking events and an annual vegetarian food festival in the fall.

== History and purpose ==
The Boston Vegetarian Society began in 1986. The first activities were centered around holding vegan potlucks in a church basement during the late 1980s. The Society has seen a steady rise in membership and attendance ever since. In 1998, it was incorporated in Massachusetts as an educational non-profit. In July 1998, it was granted 501(c)(3) tax-exempt status by the IRS.

The BVS provides info on events and related organizations, hosts the annual Boston Vegetarian Food Festival (BVFF), holds cooking classes, and promotes vegetarianism through mass transit advertising, outreach at fairs and festivals, and monthly free educational seminars. Their New Year's banquet and vegan cooking classes were reported to be particularly popular. BVS provides education, encouragement, and community support for vegetarians. The BVS also participates in the annual Earth Day Festival of Boston University.

== Boston Veg Food Fest ==
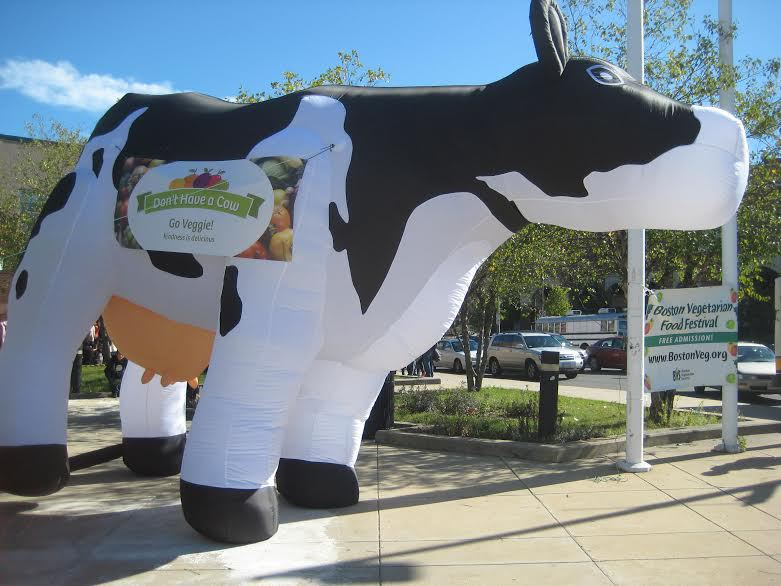

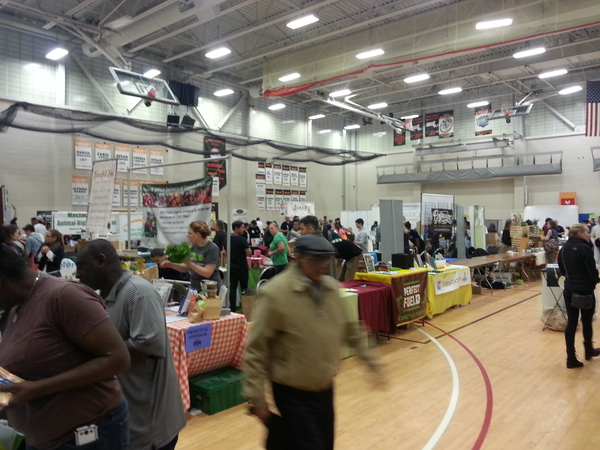

Since 1996, the Boston Vegetarian Society has annually hosted the Boston Vegetarian Food Festival (BVFF) in October or November.

It was first held on May 5, 1996, at MIT's Howard W. Johnson Athletics Center and was hosted by the MIT Vegetarian Support Group (VSG) (as of 2010 renamed MIT Vegetarian Group) and the Vegetarian Resource Group.

The second BVFF was held at Bunker Hill Community College on October 26, 1997.

Starting with the third annual festival on October 3, 1998, the BVFF has been held at the Reggie Lewis Track and Athletic Center in the Roxbury Crossing section of Boston, across the street from Roxbury Community College. Over the years, attendance grew so much that the festival was expanded from one day to two days in 2009; for the 2016 festival, organizers expected an attendance between 15,000 and 20,000.

== See also ==
- List of vegetarian and vegan festivals
- List of vegetarian and vegan organizations
- Mission Hill, Boston
- North American Vegetarian Society
