= Vegan Street Fair =

American vegan food festival

Vegan Street Fair is a vegan food festival that began in the North Hollywood neighborhood of Los Angeles in 2015. Admission is free and participating vendors sell small portions at capped prices. Its founder, Jessica Cruz, has said the event is aimed at people who are not vegan rather than at those already following a plant-based diet. Editions have since been held in other cities in the United States, and by 2026 the Los Angeles event was being held monthly in Westwood Village.

== History ==
The first Vegan Street Fair was held on March 1, 2015, at Weddington Street and Bakman Avenue in North Hollywood. Entry was free and portions were capped at $3.

The following year the fair moved to Chandler Boulevard between Lankershim Boulevard and Vineland Avenue and was advertised with more than 90 vendors. Organizers said the 2015 debut had drawn about 10,000 people.

Reporting from the March 2017 fair, VegNews said the event attracted approximately 20,000 visitors and more than 150 booths and food trucks, and quoted its founder describing the fair as a way to introduce non-vegans to plant-based food. Los Angeles magazine described the same edition as the third annual fair, held on Chandler Boulevard between Tujunga and Vineland avenues with free admission and $4 portions.

In 2023 the Norwood News published organizer-supplied attendance figures for the Los Angeles fair: 44 vendors and 10,000 attendees in 2015; 100 vendors and 20,000 attendees in 2016; more than 30,000 attendees in 2017; more than 34,000 in 2018; and, after the fair expanded to two days in 2019, more than 200 vendors and 60,000 attendees. Organizers also said the 2022 edition drew 40,000 people over two days.

Cruz told ABC7 Los Angeles in 2023 that the organization lost about $250,000 during the COVID-19 pandemic. The station reported that close to a quarter of a million people had attended the fair since 2015.

In 2026 the Los Angeles fair moved to Broxton Plaza at 1036 Broxton Avenue in Westwood Village and shifted to a monthly schedule, in a partnership with the Westwood Village Improvement Association. The April 2026 edition coincided with a CicLAvia open-streets event covering nearby Westwood Boulevard. By July the fair was alternating between afternoon and evening editions, with more than 30 vendors at that month's event.

== Format ==
Admission was free at editions reported between 2015 and 2026. At the 2016 fair, vendors accepted only scrip sold at 50 cents per ticket, samples cost about $3, and a $40 pass allowed holders to move to the front of vendor lines. Later editions capped individual items at $4 and, by 2025, at $5. At the Westwood Village fairs, each vendor is required to offer at least one item priced at $10. The events are open to all ages, allow dogs, and include DJs, live entertainment and children's activities.

Cruz has described the free entry and low prices as a way to draw people who do not already eat a plant-based diet, telling VegNews in 2024 that "Vegan Street Fair is not for vegans" but rather "for non-vegans to walk into an event like they belong."

== Other cities ==
VegNews reported that 2023 was the first year Vegan Street Fair operated as a national event, with editions in nine cities in the United States. A Bronx edition was held on May 20, 2023, on Jerome Avenue in the Highbridge section of the borough, and returned in 2024 on the Grand Concourse. Cruz, who is from the Bronx, told News 12 that she chose the borough because "the Bronx needs it more than anyone." A Seattle edition was held at Cal Anderson Park in August 2025. Cruz has also named Atlanta, the San Francisco Bay Area, Las Vegas and Miami among cities that have hosted the fair.

== Organization ==
A 2025 report described the fair as produced by an events company that also organized its Southern California and Bay Area editions. It is now produced and operated by VSF Connects, Inc., a California nonprofit corporation. The Internal Revenue Service recognized VSF Connects Incorporated as a 501(c)(3) organization in May 2022.
