= Meat-free days =

Day in which one is encouraged not to consume meat

Meat-free days or veggiedays are declared to discourage or prohibit the consumption of meat on certain days of the week. Mondays and Fridays are the most popular days. There are also movements encouraging people giving up meat on a weekly, monthly, or permanent basis.

== History ==
Abstention from meat, other than fish, was historically done for religious reasons (e.g. the Friday fast). In the Methodist Church, on Fridays, especially those of Lent, "abstinence from meat one day a week is a universal act of penitence". Anglicans (Episcopalians) and Roman Catholics also traditionally observe Friday as a meat-free day. Historically, Anglican and Catholic countries enforced prohibitions on eating meat, other than fish, on certain days of Lent. In England, for example, "butchers and victuallers were bound by heavy recognizances not to slaughter or sell meat on the weekly 'fish days', Friday and Saturday." In the Eastern Orthodox Church, Wednesdays and Fridays are meat-free days. In the Lutheran Church, Fridays and Saturdays are historically considered meat-free days. In addition to the Fridays of the year, in Western Christianity, Ash Wednesday—the first day of the repentance themed season of Lent—is a traditional day of fasting and abstinence from meat.

Among East Asian Buddhists, vegetarian Buddhist cuisine was eaten on days tied to the phases of the moon known as Uposatha.

Meat-free days have also been observed due to wartime rationing (e.g. Meatless Tuesdays in Canada and the United States—which also observed Wheatless Wednesdays—during World War I) or in states with failing economies.

In the People's Republic of Poland, meat-free days were encouraged by the government due to market forces. They were aimed at limiting meat consumption, primarily in favour of flour-based foods. The meat-free day was traditionally Friday, Monday or Wednesday.

== Ecology and society ==
Attempts to reintroduce meat-free days are part of a campaign to reduce anthropogenic climate change and improve human health and animal welfare by reducing factory farming and promoting vegetarianism or veganism.

=== Africa ===
==== South Africa ====
- Cape Town's Executive Mayor, Dan Plato, launched a "one meat-free day a week" campaign in July 2010.

=== Asia ===
==== Hong Kong ====
- Daily "Meat Free Hong Kong Meetup"

==== India ====
- International Meatless Day, also called the 'International Vegetarian Day', 25 November, birthday of Sadhu T.L. Vaswani, who was an Indian educationist who started the Mira development for improving Indian instructional framework, beginning with settling St. Mira's School in Hyderabad, Sindh. The campaign for International Meatless Day was begun in 1986 by the Sadhu Vaswani Mission, an association for social administration for the abused and underprivileged.

==== Pakistan ====
- Reportedly, Meatless Tuesdays and Wednesdays were observed in Pakistan, from Benazir Bhutto's era in the 1990s through part of the 21st century.

==== Singapore ====
- Various green groups in Singapore, coordinated by the Vegetarian Society (Singapore), have made Thursdays a meat-free day

==== Taiwan ====
- Meat-free Mondays in Taipei

=== Europe ===
==== Belgium ====
- Ghent
- Hasselt
- Mechelen

==== Germany ====
- Bremen
- During the federal elections in 2013, the German green party Bündnis '90/Die Grünen campaigned with a so-called "veggie day" in their manifesto, which resulted in a public outcry over "paternalism".

==== Norway ====
- the Norwegian Armed Forces

==== Switzerland ====
- Thursdays, coordinated by Swissveg

=== North America ===
==== United States ====
- Los Angeles has declared all Mondays "Meatless Mondays," citing actions by Baltimore public-school system, Oakland, California Unified School District and school districts in Arlington, Virginia, Oneida, New York, Longmont, Colorado; the cities of San Francisco, Takoma Park and Annapolis, Maryland, Marin County, California and the District of Columbia Council.

== See also ==
- Awareness day
- Friday fast
- List of food days
- Meatless Monday
- List of vegetarian and vegan festivals
- Vegetarian week
- Vegan school meal
- World Vegan Day
- World Vegetarian Day
