= Dawn Jackson Blatner =

American dietitian, author, and media personality

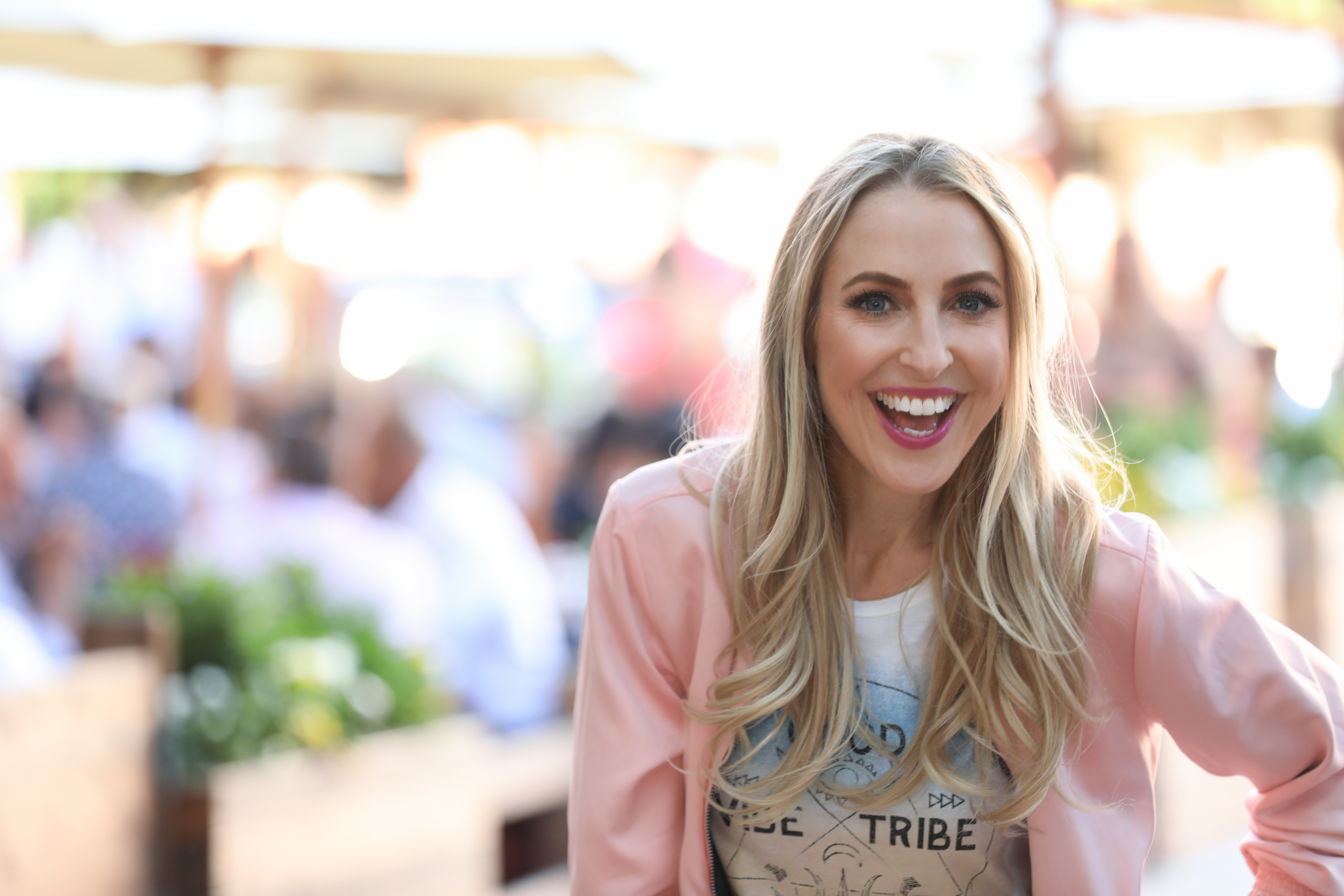
Blanter in 2018

Dawn Jackson Blatner is an American registered dietitian, television and media personality, and published author of the books The Flexitarian Diet and The Superfood Swap. She has been hailed as Chicago's "top dietitian" and "one of the best nutritionists in the country." She is the host of the lifestyle program SEE Chicago (Shopping, Entertainment, and Events) on WGN-TV.

== Work as a dietitian ==
Blatner obtained her Bachelor of Science in 1997 for Food Science, Human Nutrition and Dietetics from the University of Illinois. In 2002, she joined the Northwestern Memorial Hospital's Wellness Institute and became a spokeswoman for the American Dietetic Association.

Blatner is a Registered Dietitian Nutritionist (RDN) and Certified Specialist in Sports Dietetics (CSSD). She is the Nutrition Consultant for the Chicago Cubs, former food and nutrition blogger with The Huffington Post, a nutrition expert on the advisory board of Shape, and a launch member of the People "Health Squad". She is the author of two award-winning books: The Flexitarian Diet and The Superfood Swap. She recently starred in and subsequently won the hit primetime ABC television show called My Diet Is Better Than Yours. Blatner received Lifetime Television's Remarkable Woman Award for her work in the field of nutrition, and has over 15 years experience working with clients to super-charge their health. She is the creator of the Nutrition WOW blog and weekly eblast, which was ranked the "Best RD Blog" by Health.

== The Flexitarian Diet ==
Blatner is best known for her advocacy of the flexitarian diet, which includes fruits, vegetables, legumes, and whole grains with a moderated intake of animal products. In 2009, she authored Flexitarian Diet: The Mostly Vegetarian Way to Lose Weight, Be Healthier, Prevent Disease, and Add Years to Your Life. According to the U.S. News & World Report Best Diet Rankings the flexitarian diet ranked No. 2 in the "Best Diets Overall".

== Selected publications ==
- The Flexitarian Diet (McGraw-Hill, 2009) ISBN 978-0-07-154957-8
- The Superfood Swap (Houghton Mifflin Harcourt, 2016) ISBN 978-0-544-53555-8
