= Meatless Monday =

International campaign that encourages people to not eat meat

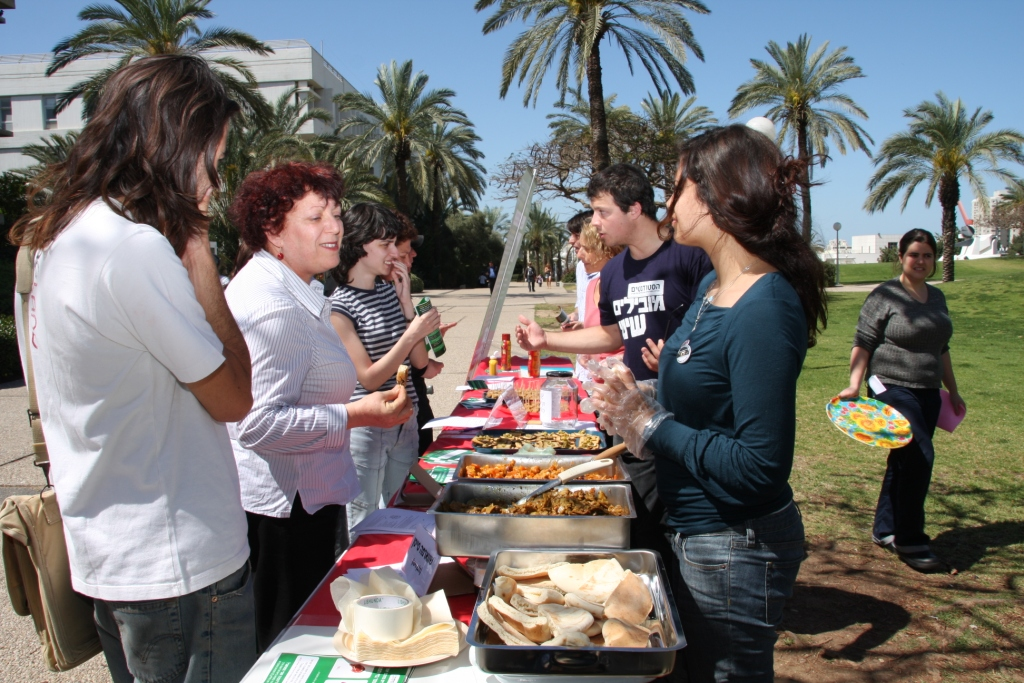
A Meatless Monday event in Israel in 2010

Meatless Monday and Meat-Free Monday are international campaigns that encourage people to not eat meat on Mondays to improve their health and diminish environmental effects.

== History ==
=== Greece ===
In the Greek island of Crete, the tradition of consuming legumes every Monday is deeply ingrained, with meat traditionally considered inappropriate to eat on this day. This aligns with the religious observance of Clean Monday in Greece, marking the start of Lent and emphasizing purity, including abstinence from meat. Monday was traditionally seen as a day to "purify the body" after the consumption of meat on Sunday, which was traditionally the only day of the week when meat was consumed. This practice fits well with the Meat Free Monday initiative, reflecting Crete's traditional diet where vegetables and legumes dominate (70% of intake), while meat (10%) and fish and seafood (20%) are less commonly consumed. This culinary tradition aligns with cultural and religious practices aimed at improving health and minimising environmental impact.

=== United States ===
During World War I, U.S. President Woodrow Wilson issued a proclamation calling for Tuesday to be observed as a meatless day each week and for one meatless meal to be observed each day. The United States Food Administration (USFA) urged families to reduce consumption of key staples to help the war effort and avoid rationing. Conserving food would support U.S. troops as well as feed populations in Europe where food production and distribution had been disrupted by the war. To encourage voluntary rationing, the USFA created the slogan "Food Will Win the War" and coined the terms "Meatless Tuesday" and "Wheatless Wednesday" to remind Americans to reduce intake of those products.

Herbert Hoover was the head of the Food Administration as well as the American Relief Association during Woodrow Wilson's presidency, and played a key role implementing the campaign, which was one of Hoover's many attempts to encourage volunteerism and sacrifice among Americans during the war. The USFA provided a wide variety of materials in addition to advertising, including recipe books and menus found in magazines, newspapers and government-sponsored pamphlets.

The campaign returned with the onset of World War II, calling upon women on the home front to play a role in supporting the war effort. During this time, meat was being rationed, along with other commodities like sugar and gasoline. The Truman administration, through the Citizens Food Committee, encouraged "Meatless Tuesdays" and "Poultryless Thursdays" throughout the autumn of 1947; backlash was swift, noncompliance was rampant, and the poultry lobby responded with the National Thanksgiving Turkey Presentation, the forerunner of the modern "turkey pardon."

==== Meatless Monday Campaigns ====
Several organizations promote meatless monday in the United States, such as the Meatless Monday nonprofit initiative founded by marketing professional Sid Lerner, of The Monday Campaigns Inc. in association with the Johns Hopkins Bloomberg School of Public Health Center for a Livable Future. The public-facing campaign was designed and piloted by Social Impact Studios, a national creative agency based in Philadelphia that focuses mainstream marketing practices on social issues. Meatless Monday is based in the United States.

Meatless Monday is part of the Healthy Monday initiative. The program follows the nutrition guidelines developed by the USDA. Healthy Monday encourages Americans to make healthier decisions at the start of every week. Other Healthy Monday campaigns include: The Kids Cook Monday, Monday 2000, Quit and Stay Quit Monday, Move it Monday, The Monday Mile, and others.

Meatless Monday focuses its initiative on Mondays for several reasons. Wednesday and Friday are traditionally days for fasting among Catholic and Orthodox Christians. Monday is typically the beginning of the work week, the day when individuals settle back into their weekly routine. Habits that prevailed over the weekend can be forgotten and replaced by other choices. A weekly reminder to restart healthy habits also encourages success. A 2009 trial published in the American Journal of Preventive Medicine provided individuals with weekly health prompts and encouragement. Approximately two thirds of participants responded with improvements in their overall health, eating habits and physical activity levels. Monday was also chosen for being alliterative with "Meatless" (cf. Taco Tuesday and other similar day-specific campaigns).

On April 6, 2010, San Francisco became the first city in the United States to officially declare Mondays to be "meat free", calling it their Vegetarian Day. Several other countries have meat-free days as well, including Canada.

=== United Kingdom ===
Meat-free Mondays exist in the United Kingdom both as an advertising campaign for Goodlife Foods and as an environmental campaign. On June 15, 2009 Paul McCartney and his daughters Stella and Mary launched a Meat-free Monday campaign.

=== Argentina ===
In 2017, the Casa Rosada of Argentina instituted, for one lunch of the day, meat-free Mondays, serving only vegan options to its approximately 500 employees, including Argentinian President Mauricio Macri.

=== Australia ===
In December 2009, Meatless Mondays launched in Australia.

=== Belgium ===
In May 2009, the city of Ghent, Belgium became the first city with "official" weekly vegetarian days. Veggie Thursday (or "Donderdag Veggiedag" in Dutch) was created by the Ethical Vegetarian Alternative, an organisation partially funded by the Flemish government.

=== Brazil ===
In October 2009, Meatless Monday was launched in São Paulo with government support by the Brazilian Vegetarian Society.

=== Israel ===
Israeli magazine Al Hashulchan (On the Table) introduced the Sheni Tzimchoni (Vegetarian Monday) initiative in June 2009. Dozens of Israel's top restaurants will create innovative meatless meals on Mondays throughout July and August 2009.

== Vegetarianism adoption ==
Meatless Mondays is related to efforts to add daily vegetarian and vegan school meals.

Committed engagement in Meatless Mondays has been associated with a higher likelihood of adopting a vegetarian diet. A 2021 study found that one-third of participants who continually partook in Meatless Monday became vegetarian after 5 years.

== Opposition ==
An attempt by the Greens in Brighton, England, to initiate Meat-Free Mondays, thereby stopping the local council cafeteria selling any meat-based foods, was halted after opposition from council staff.

== Press timeline ==
- Woman's Day magazine has included Meatless Monday on their monthly recipe calendar since 2004. Each menu offers healthy meal options for four and includes a set weekly shopping list.
- From September 2008 to July 2009, Kim O'Donnel, a food journalist and trained cook, offered weekly Meatless Monday recipes in her Washington Post column "A Mighty Appetite".
- The Face on Your Plate: The Truth About Food, written in March 2009 by Jeffrey Moussaieff Masson acknowledged Meatless Monday as a way to reduce meat consumption and improve overall health.
- Articles regarding Meatless Monday have been published by several authors in The Huffington Post since April 2009. Notable contributor Kathy Freston is author of several self-help & wellness books, including The Quantum Wellness Cleanse.
- In his book In Defense of Food, journalist Michael Pollan coined the phrase "Eat food. Not too much. Mostly plants." He has since cited Meatless Monday as a way to reach this goal. So in April 2009 Pollan expressed the need for Americans to reduce meat consumption on The Oprah Winfrey Show: "even one meatless day a week—a Meatless Monday, which is what we do in our household—if everybody in America did that, that would be the equivalent of taking 20 million mid-size sedans off the road."
- Carole Carson, author and spokeswoman for AARP's "Fat 2 Fit" challenge, began offering Meatless Monday recipes to AARP's online community in June 2009.
- In June 2009, the film Food, Inc. listed Meatless Monday as one of the 10 Things You Can Do To Change Our Food System.
- Also in June 2009 leading recipe site Epicurious teamed up with NutritionData.com to start offering weekly Meatless Monday recipes.
- In July 2009, The Huffington Post Green began a weekly Meatless Monday recipe column. The articles are written by nationally syndicated columnist Ellen Kanner, The Edgy Veggie.
- Baltimore City Public Schools began a system-wide Meatless Monday program in 2009. The initiative also includes health education and produce from local sources. BCPS's efforts were acknowledged by Johns Hopkins University in September 2009, when they were given the Center for a Livable Future Award.
- In December 2009, Al Gore formally endorsed the Meatless Monday campaign before EU Parliament. Gore now lists Meatless Monday as one of the Top 12 Things You Can Do Now for a better world on his Climate Crisis blog.
- Former Manhattan borough president Scott Stringer proposed that all New York City public schools switch to Meatless Monday in his Food NYC report on February 17, 2010. Several NYC schools have followed the recommendation.
- The San Francisco Board of Supervisors passed a Meatless Monday resolution on April 6, 2010, to "encourage restaurants, schools and grocery stores to offer plant-based options".
- On April 12, 2010, The Johns Hopkins Hospital launched Meatless Monday in their cafeteria.
- ABC Family's teen TV Series 10 Things I Hate About You aired an episode called "Meat is Murder" on April 19, 2010, where one of the lead characters, Kat, convinces her student council to launch Meatless Mondays in their high school cafeteria.
- Chef Mario Batali unveiled Meatless Monday menus in all 14 of his restaurants in April 2010. Each menu now includes two weekly features.
- The Washington Post reported on the international growth of the campaign on May 19, 2010. The article details the rising Meatless Monday movement and the meat industry's reaction.
- Fox News' Sunday Housecall with Dr. Isadore Rosenfeld aired a segment featuring Meatless Monday on July 25, 2010. He stated that recent studies showed meat consumption can impede weight loss. Dr. Rosenfeld presents a Healthy Monday tip on his show each week.
- On August 9, 2010, NPR conducted an interview with Sid Lerner, the founder of the Meatless Monday campaign, about the growing public awareness and support.
- TIME magazine profiled six chefs that are creating flexitarian dishes in their August 23, 2010 issue. Included were Meatless Monday supporters Mario Batali, Wolfgang Puck and John Fraser.
- Andrew Freeman & Co. included Meatless Monday in their 2011 Trend List: 18 up-and-coming ideas that restaurateurs should be watching, noting that "Meatless Mondays and vegetable based tasting menus are gaining traction as guests realize it's not all about the meat on the plate."
- Institutional feeder Sodexo announced in January 2011 that it would be offering Meatless Monday materials to more than 900 hospitals in their network. This effort was expanded in April 2011 when Sodexo provided materials to more than 2000 corporate and government client locations in North America, including Toyota, Northern Trust Bank and the U.S. Department of the Interior.
- In February 2011 The Oprah Winfrey Show highlighted Meatless Monday in an episode on vegan living. Oprah declared that Meatless Monday options would be available in the Harpo Studios cafeteria. Oprah then asked her studio audience to take part in the campaign, saying "Meatless Monday is something you can do at home with your family if you choose".
- A report by the American Meat Institute in February 2011 found that 18% of American households now participate in Meatless Mondays.
- In June 2011 Aspen, Colorado became the first official "Meatless Monday city" with over 20 local restaurants, Aspen Valley Hospital, Aspen Elementary School, The Aspen Club & Spa, and The University of Colorado School of Medicine participating.
- A tracking study conducted by FGI research found that, as of May 23, 2011, U.S. awareness of the Meatless Monday campaign had reached 50.22% (up from 30% 6 months previously). Of those aware of Meatless Monday, 27.47% said the campaign had influenced their decision to cut back on meat. In response Meatless Monday launched their "get the other half" initiative, aimed at encouraging participants to tell their friends and family about the movement.
- In March 2012, the Government of Croatia also supported the initiative, excluding meat from the menu of the Ministry of Environment and Nature Protection on Mondays.
- In November 2012, the City of Los Angeles declared all Mondays to be "Meatless Mondays," citing actions by the Baltimore City Public School System, Oakland Unified School District, along with other school districts in Arlington, VA, Oneida, NY and Longmont, CO, as well as the cities of San Francisco, Takoma Park, MD, and Annapolis, MD, Marin County, CA, and the Council of the District of Columbia.
- On October 23, 2017, NYC Mayor Bill de Blasio, Schools Chancellor Carmen Fariña and Brooklyn Borough President Eric Adams announced that 15 Brooklyn schools will participate in Meatless Mondays starting in the spring of 2018.

== See also ==
- Friday fast
- Meat-free days
- Meat Atlas
- Flexitarianism
- World Vegan Day
- World Vegetarian Day
- Vrata
- Veganuary
- Vegan school meal
