= World Vegan Day =

Day celebrating vegan aims

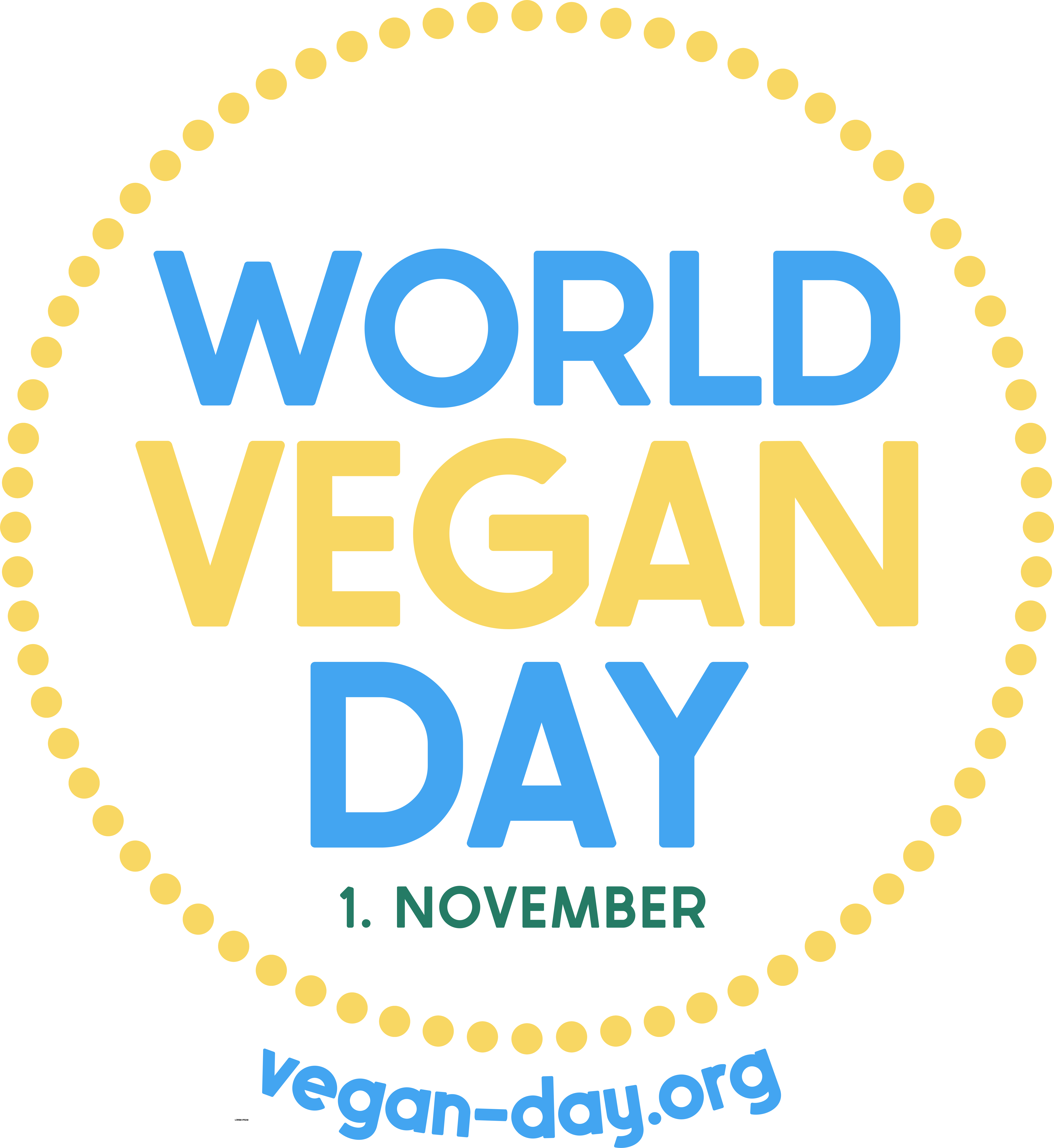
- World Vegan Day Logo
- Type: International
- Date: 1 November
- Next time: 1 November 2027
- Frequency: Annual
- Related to: World Vegetarian Day

World Vegan Day is a global event celebrated annually on 1 November. Vegans celebrate the benefits of veganism through activities such as setting up stalls, hosting potlucks, and planting memorial trees.

== History ==
World Vegan Day was established in 1994 by Louise Wallis, then Chair of The Vegan Society in the United Kingdom, to commemorate the 50th anniversary of the founding of the organization and the coining of the terms "vegan" and "veganism". Speaking in 2011, Wallis said: "We knew the Society had been founded in November 1944 but didn’t know the exact date, so I decided to go for 1 November, partly because I liked the idea of this date coinciding with Samhain/Halloween and the Day of the Dead - traditional times for feasting and celebration, both apt and auspicious."

== Calendar context ==
World Vegan Day is celebrated in continuity with Vegetarian Awareness Month (all of October), which begins with World Vegetarian Day on 1 October. October also includes other commemorative dates involving reverence for life in all species, faith-based vegetarianism and animal advocacy, and more.

World Vegan Day follows Vegetarian Awareness Month (October) and initiates World Vegan Month (all of November).

2 November, commemorated as Dynamic Harmlessness Day, is the birthday of the late H. Jay Dinshah, founder of the American Vegan Society.

== Europe ==
=== Germany ===
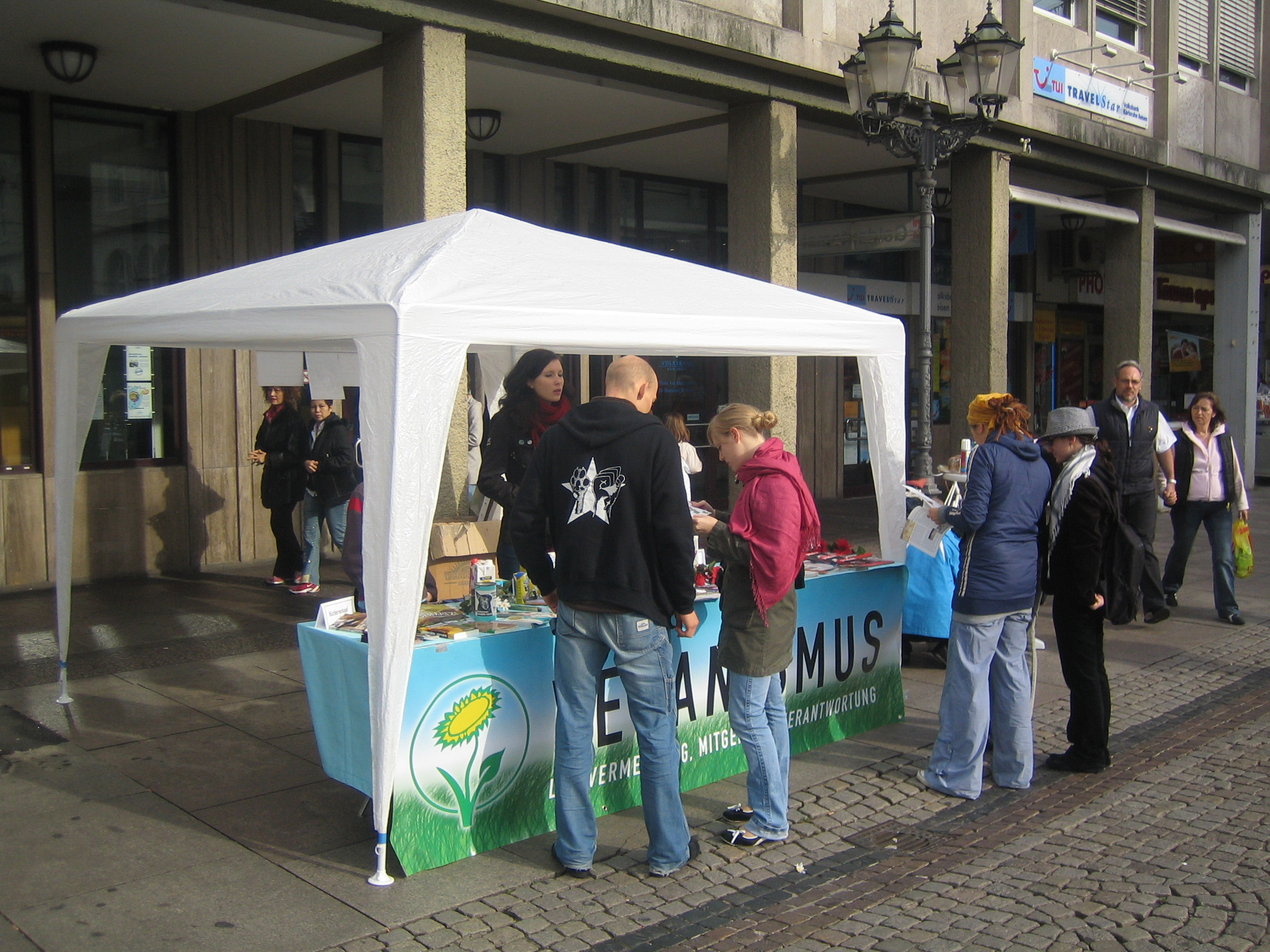
An activity celebrating World Vegan Day

- World Vegan Day, Germany. Several different events in the metropolitan cities.

=== Ireland ===
- In 2022, the Full Irish Vegan campaign encouraged restaurants to offer plant-based options for World Vegan Day, with over 160 eateries getting involved.

=== United Kingdom ===
- A festival is planned in Glasgow during October.
- In 2024, there is a festival planned in Essex, as well as markets in Salisbury and Surrey.

== North America ==
=== United States ===
==== Boston, Massachusetts ====
- Annual Boston Vegetarian Food Festival (all weekend), free vegan food (many thousands of attenders), sponsored annually and currently by the Boston Vegetarian Society.

=== San Francisco, California ===
- There has been an annual event in San Francisco since 1999.

=== Richmond, Virginia ===
- The Vegan Society started WVD events in Richmond in 2018.

== Africa ==
=== Nigeria ===
- The Lagos Veg Fest is held every year in Lagos.

== Middle East and Asia ==
- Turkey and India have held WVD events in the past.

== Oceania ==
=== Australia ===
==== Adelaide ====
- Adelaide celebrates World Vegan Day every year on the first Sunday in November. The first Vegan Festival was held on 4 November 2007. The event is possible because of many individual volunteers and members of various organizations. Kas Ward created the Vegan Festival in Adelaide and is the main event coordinator.
- M.A.D. FREE Weekend in Adelaide celebrates World Vegan Day in November. 13–15 November 2009.

==== Melbourne ====
- Since 2003 World Vegan Day has been celebrated in Melbourne on the last Sunday of October. The event was initiated by members of the vegan social group Vegans Unite and is now organized by a committee affiliated with Vegetarian Victoria. Stalls include Lentil as Anything, Invita Living Foods, Animals Australia, Aduki Independent Press, Eco-shout Melbourne, Vegan Society of Australia, ALV, the Melbourne University Food Co-op, Lush Australia and eco store.

=== Perth ===
- Perth organises a market and entertainment on the first weekend of November.

==== Sydney ====
- The Winery by Gazebo in Surry Hills will hold Sydney's first annual event on the first Sunday of November, being Sunday 6th in 2016.

=== New Zealand ===
==== Dunedin ====
- The Dunedin Ōtepoti Vegan Society (DŌVeS) runs events each year.

==== Invercargill ====
- The Invercargill Vegan Society in Invercargill, New Zealand, has celebrated World Vegan Day since 2011. The world's southernmost vegan group, for World Vegan Day 2012 they gave away tofu to butchers, placed posters around their city, gave away vegan muffins in the city centre and held a group potluck dinner. World Vegan Day 2013 celebrations included visits to butchers' shops and vegan baking and soya milk giveaways in the city centre. Vegan activists were included on the CUE TV's news bulletin and gave a soft toy dog to an animal-skin-preserving factory. A potluck dinner was held at Invercargill public library as the sun set on World Vegan Day 2013.
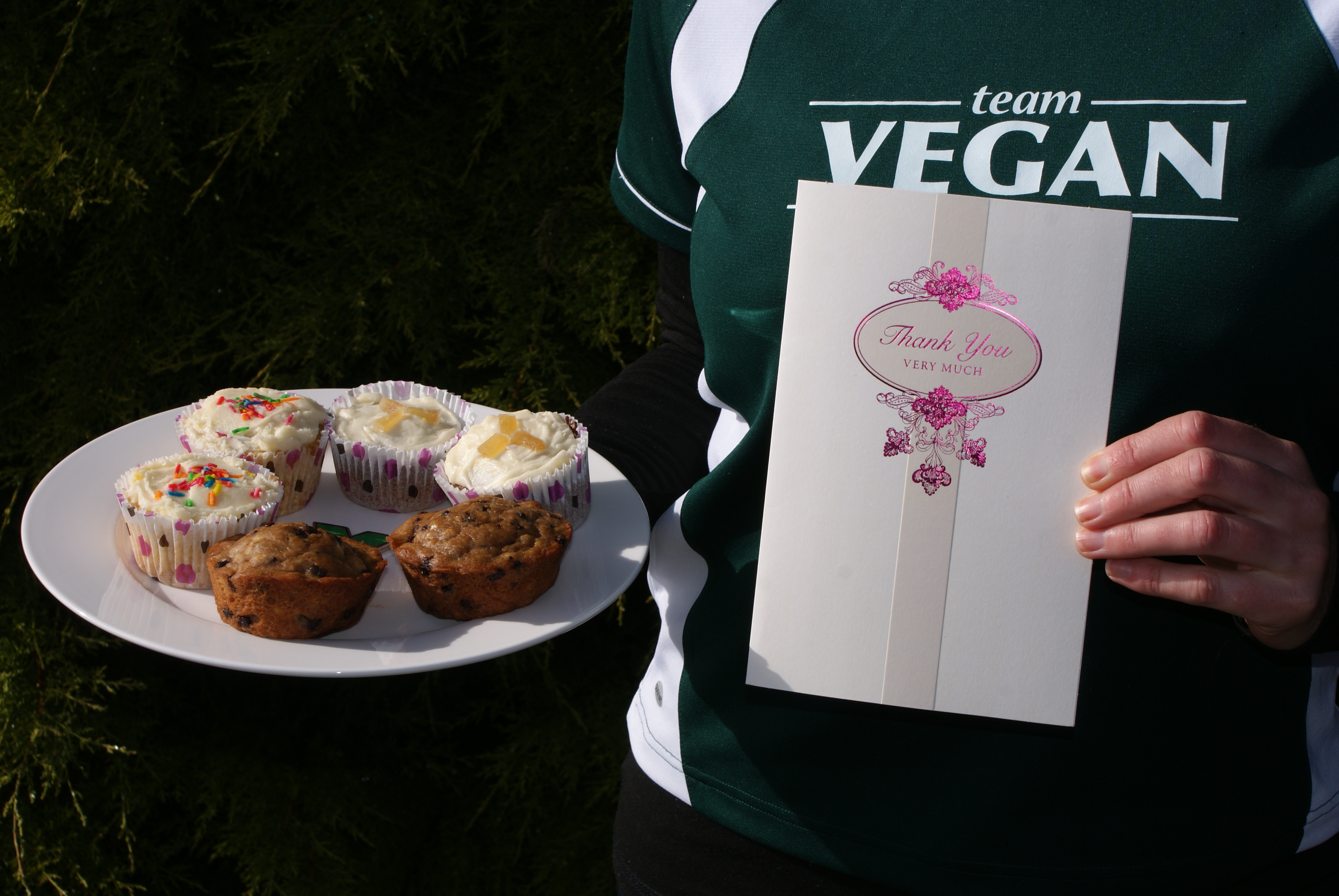
Animal advocates acknowledge vegan-friendly businesses with baking and thank-you cards

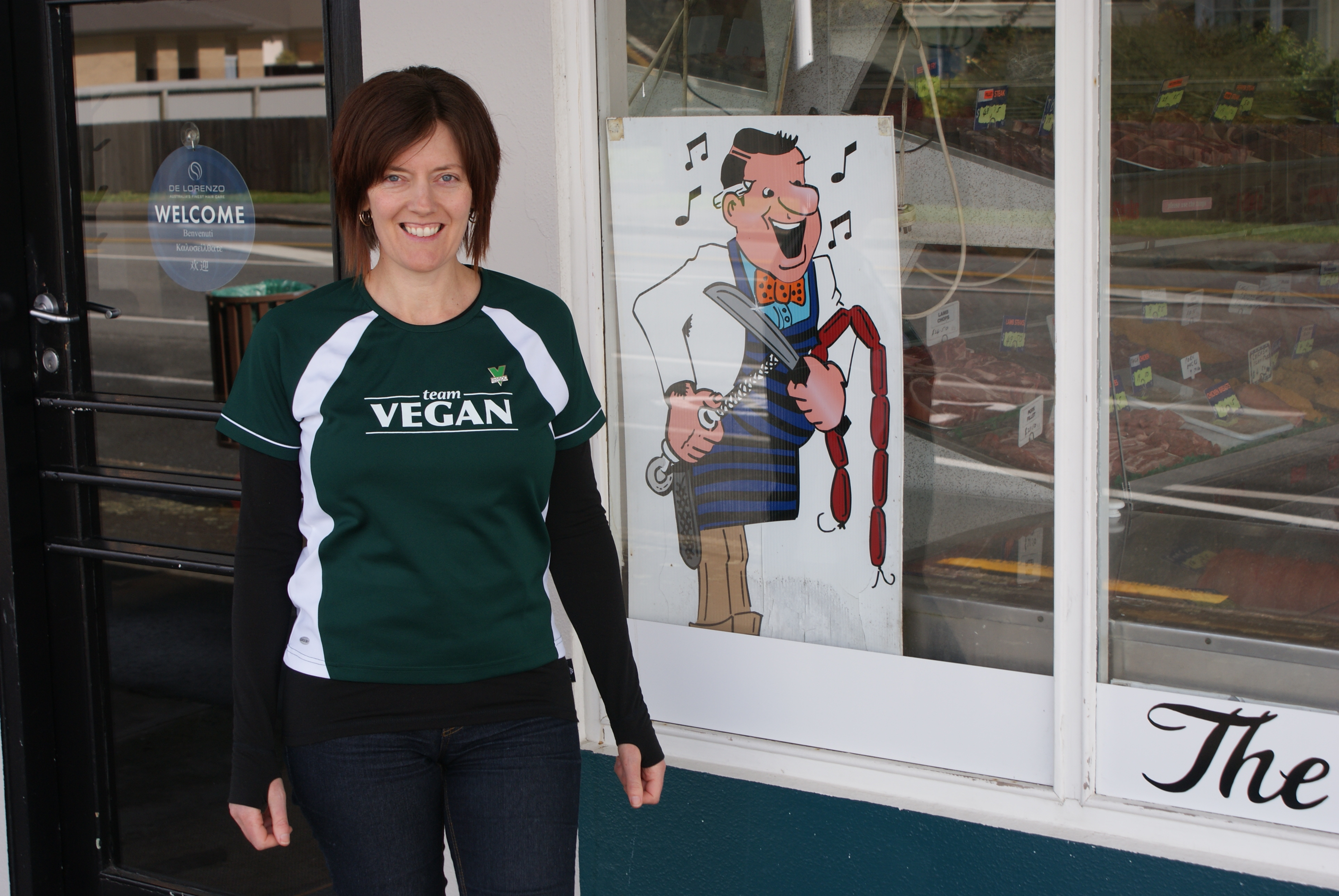
Vegan activists visit local butchers to give them tofu

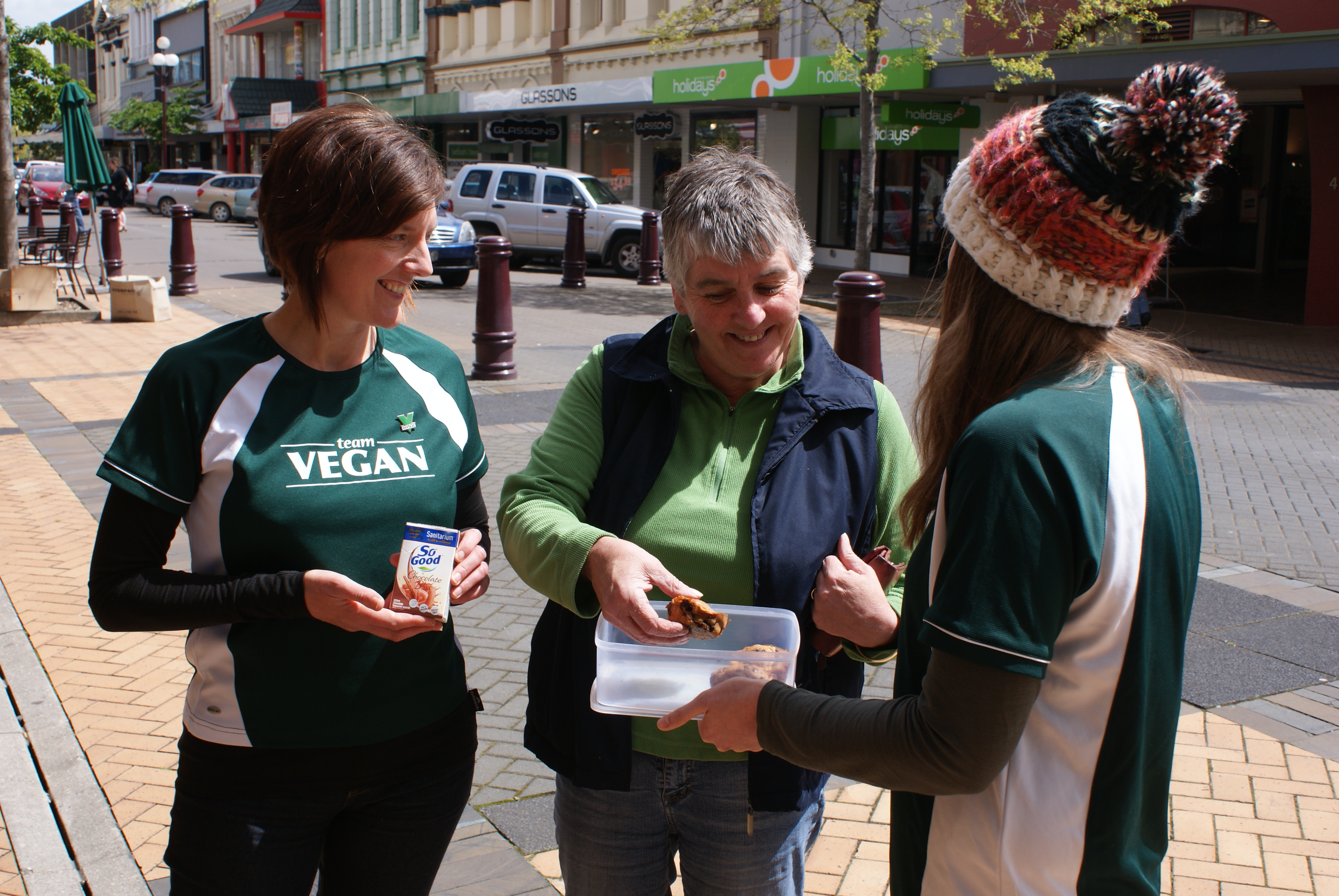
Vegans giving out soy milk alongside banana chocolate chip muffins on the street

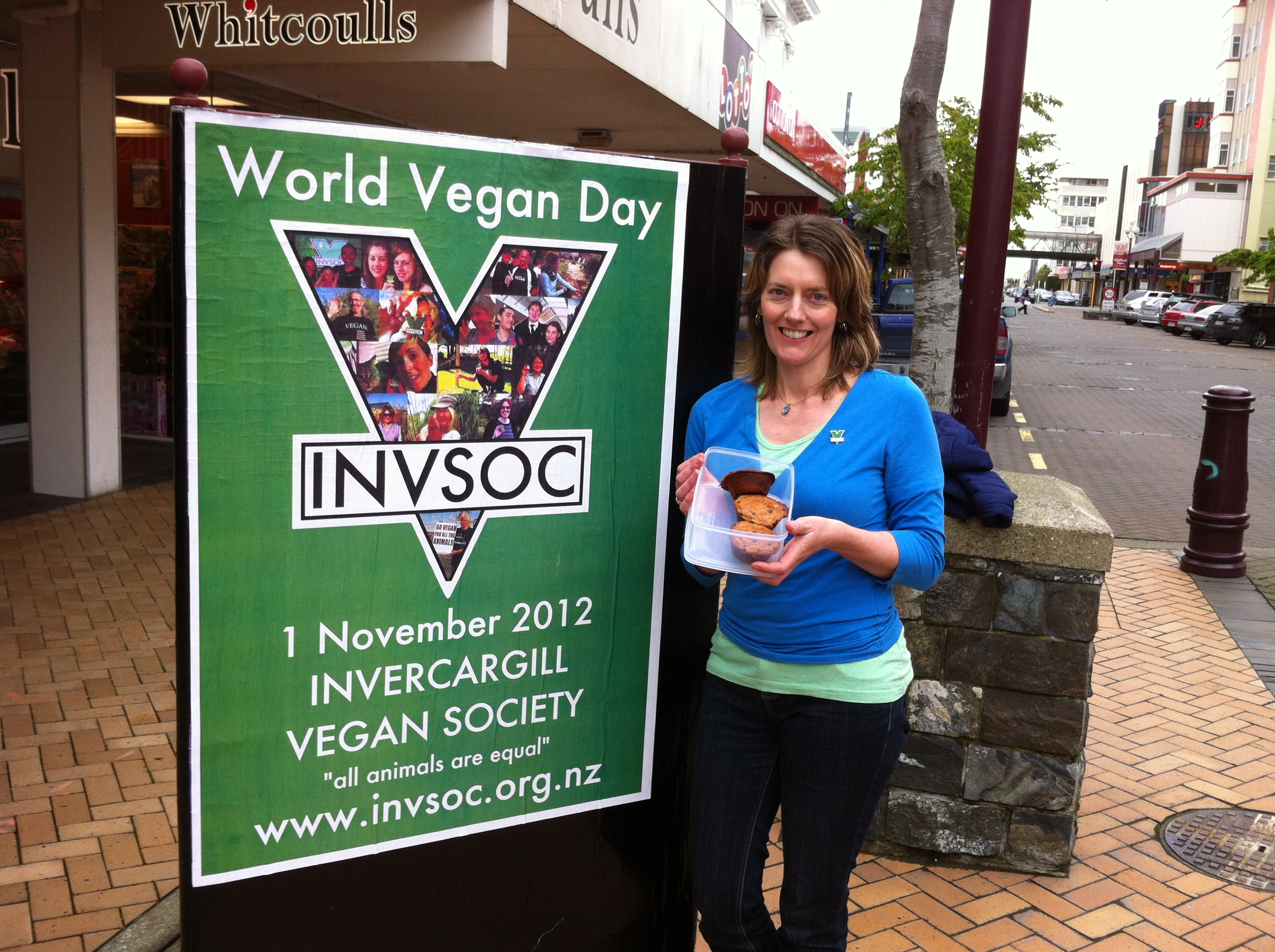
A vegan activist gives out baking by a World Vegan Day street poster

== See also ==
- List of food days
- List of vegetarian festivals
- Meat-free days
- November 1
- Veganuary
- Vegan school meal
- List of vegan restaurants
- Meatless Monday
