= VeggieWorld =

Vegan food and clothing festival

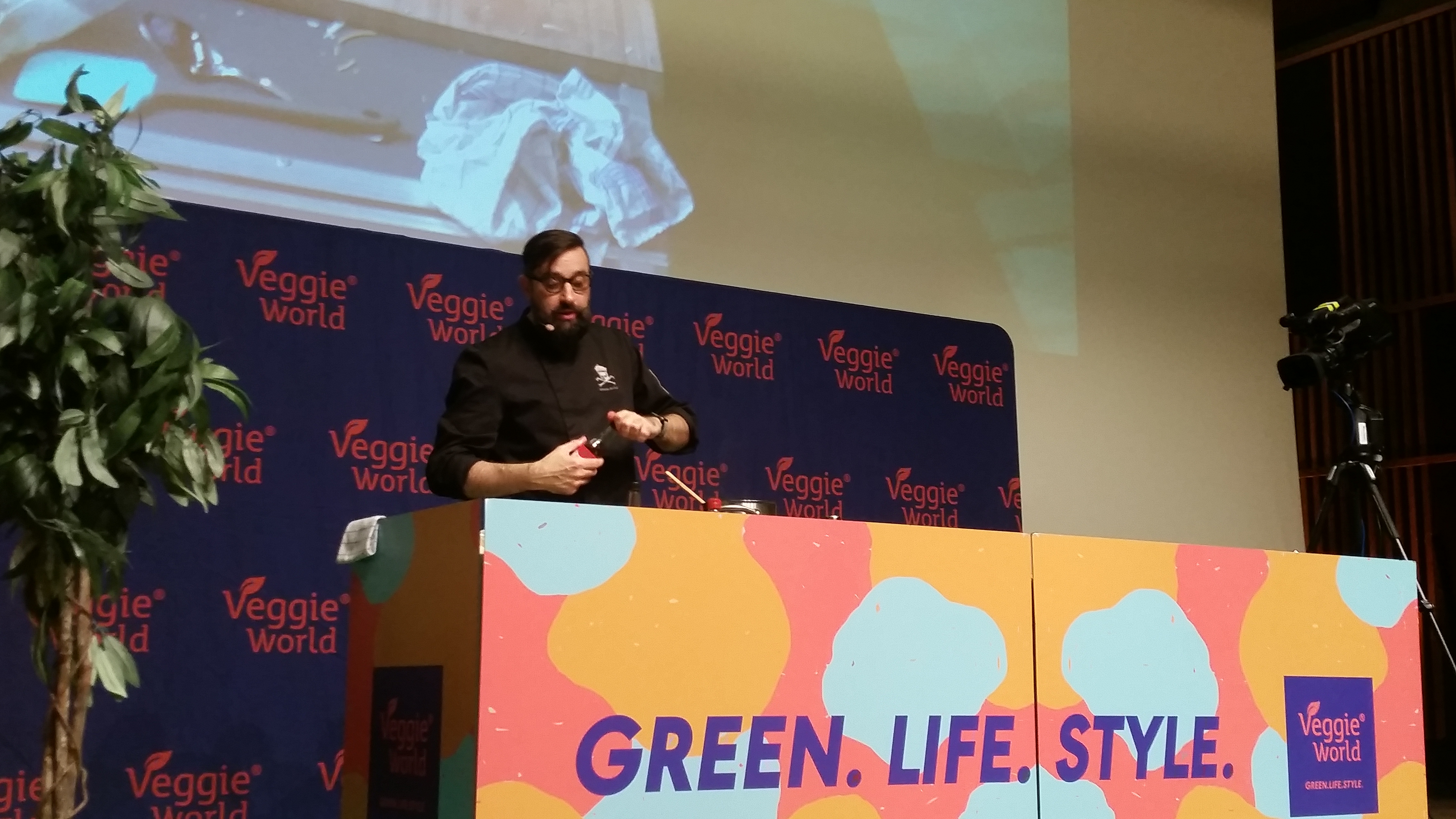
Live cooking demonstration at VeggieWorld Paris 2019

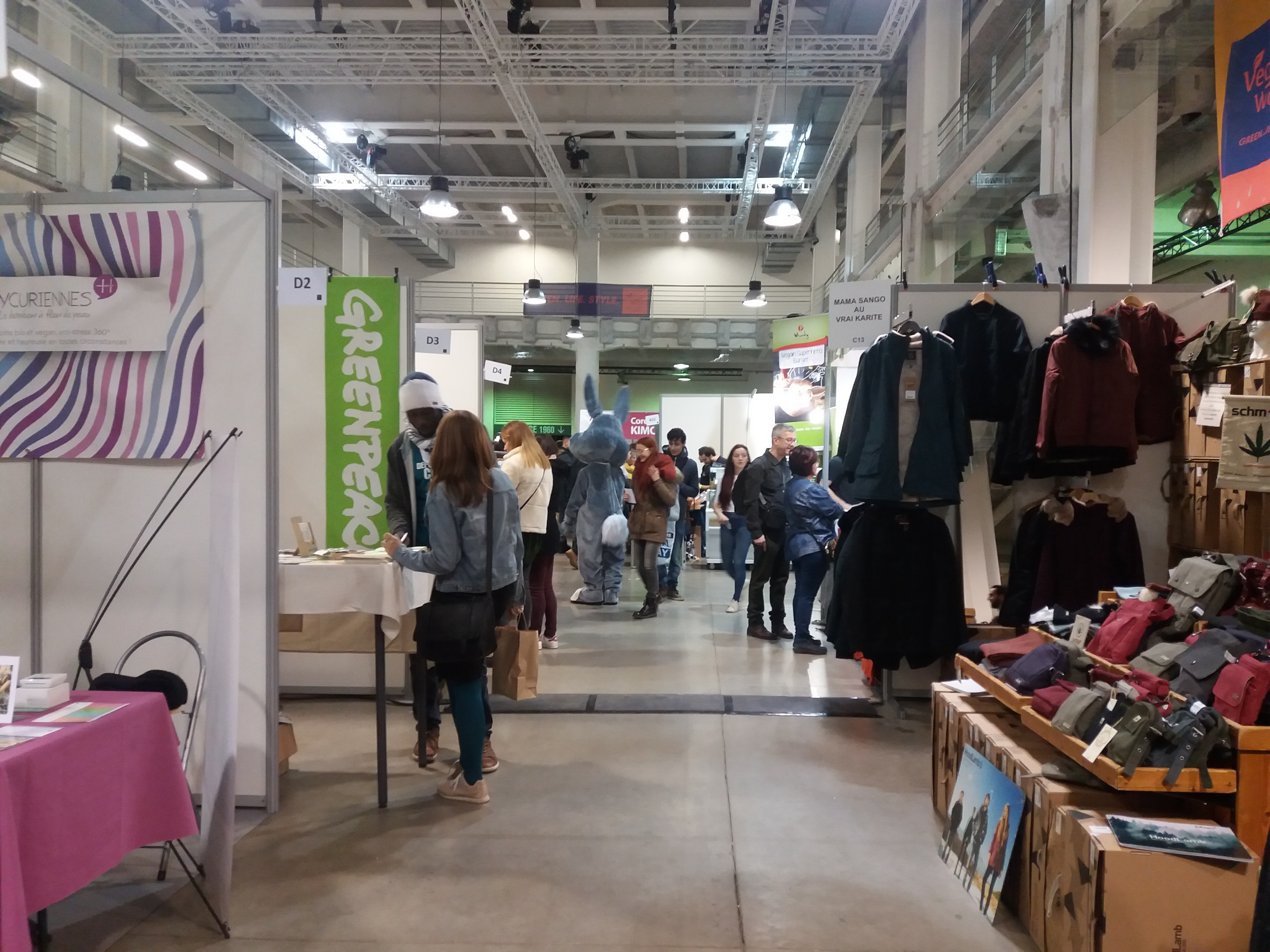
Main alley at VeggieWorld Lyon 2019 with various stands

VeggieWorld is an annual vegan food and clothing festival held in numerous locations around Europe and Asia. It is one of the biggest vegan festivals in the world, with an average 8,000 visitors (compared with 14,500 visitors at the 2018 London Vegfest). The first VeggieWorld festival was held in Wiesbaden in 2011, hosted by ProVeg Deutschland (known as Vegetarierbund Deutschland until 2017).

== Locations ==
The festivals have taken place in different countries and cities in Europe, some of which are listed here.

- Germany: Düsseldorf (since 2015), Berlin (2015-2023), Frankfurt & Wiesbaden (since 2011), Hamburg, Cologne (since 2019), Munich (since 2016), Karlsruhe (since 2023)
- France: Paris, Lyon
- Netherlands: Utrecht (since 2016)
- Switzerland: Zürich

== Editions ==
10 editions of VeggieWorld were held in Wiesbaden from 2011 to 2020, with the last attracting 13,000 visitors. The next edition was scheduled to take place in 2021 in Fredenhagen near Frankfurt, but was rescheduled to 2022.

VeggieWorld Berlin was first held in 2015 with 55 stands, which grew to 130 stands in 2019. The 2019 edition saw 10,000 visitors.

VeggieWorld Utrecht has been organised by ProVeg Nederland (known as Viva Las Vega until 2017) since 2016. The first edition attracted over 7,600 visitors, making it the largest vegan fair in the Netherlands. The 2020 edition attracted 9,000 visitors.

VeggieWorld Paris 2019 was the 7th Parisian edition and attracted over 8,000 visitors, which was 14% more than the 6th. The 3rd edition of VeggieWorld Lyon was held in 2019.

== See also ==
- List of vegetarian and vegan festivals
