= World Vegetarian Day =

Observed annually around the planet on October 1

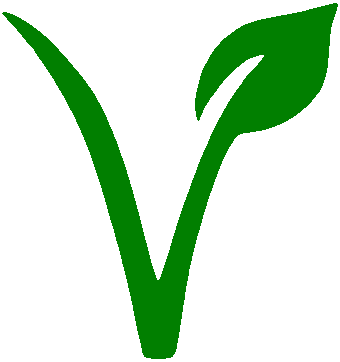
- European Vegetarian Union trademark, generally used to indicate 'vegetarian' or 'vegan'
- Official name: World Vegetarian Day
- Observed by: Vegetarians across the planet
- Significance: First day of Vegetarian Awareness Month (month of October)
- Celebrations: Local, regional, and national groups organize events to promote the desirability and benefits of vegetarian practices.
- Date: October 1
- Next time: 1 October 2026
- Frequency: annual
- Related to: Vegetarian Awareness Month, World Farm Animals Day, International Vegetarian Week (IVW), International Vegan Day also known as World Vegan Day, International Vegetarian Day

World Vegetarian Day is observed annually around the planet on October 1. It is a day of celebration established by the North American Vegetarian Society in 1977 and endorsed by the International Vegetarian Union in 1978, "To promote the joy, compassion and life-enhancing possibilities of vegetarianism." It brings awareness to the ethical, environmental, health, and humanitarian benefits of a vegetarian lifestyle. World Vegetarian Day initiates the month of October as Vegetarian Awareness Month, which ends with November 1, World Vegan Day, as the end of that month of celebration. Vegetarian Awareness Month has been known variously as "Reverence for Life" month, "Month of Vegetarian Food", and more.

== Additional days ==
Several additional days of vegetarian significance are included in or near Vegetarian Awareness Month:

- Month of September - National Fruits & Veggies Month
- September 24 or 27 – "Hug a Vegan/Vegetarian Day"
- September 29 – World Heart Day
- October 1 – World Vegetarian Day
- October 2 – World Farm Animals Day (WFAD) or World Day for Farm(ed) Animals, birthday of Mohandas K. Gandhi
- October 4 – The Feast Day of St. Francis of Assisi and World Animal Day
- October 4 – Hug a Non-Meat Eater Day
- October 1–7 – International Vegetarian Week (IVW) - in several nations across the planet (but especially in Europe), many public educational and celebratory events are organized to promote the vegetarian lifestyle.
- First full week and additional 'straggler' days (in order to include as many weekends as possible for church, mosque, and temple involvement) – World Week of Prayer for Animals and World Animal Day (always includes The Feast Day of St. Francis of Assisi). This may have been initiated by the now-defunct INRA (International Network for Religion and Animals), founded in 1985 by Virginia Bouraquardez (also known as Ginnie Bee), and later led by UCC minister, Rev. Marc Wessels.
- November 1 – International Vegan Day, also known as World Vegan Day – a vegan holiday celebrated since 1994 to commemorate the creation of The Vegan Society
- Month of November - Vegan Awareness Month or World Vegan Month.

== Additional Global Vegetarian Days ==
- March 20 – Great American Meatout – developed and sponsored every year by FARM, also known as Farm Animal Rights Movement.
- World Meat Free Day (June 13, 2016) is sponsored by a gathering of like-minded organisations - Eating Better Alliance, Compassion in World Farming, Friends of the Earth, and a few more - who want to spread the messaging regarding the impact meat consumption can have on sustainability and health.
- The last Friday of September- International 'Hug a Vegetarian' Day Some may have tried to 'regularize' that floating date for "Hug a Vegan/Vegetarian Day" as either September 24 or 27 rather than the last Friday of September, as set by PETA2 in 2014 or before
- November 25 – International Vegetarian Day also known as SAK Meatless Day – the birthday of Sadhu T. L. Vaswani (largely celebrated in India and throughout the Asian Pacific Rim nations, but known in Western nations among many vegetarians of Indian and Southeast Asian descent).

== International Vegetarian Days ==
- Meatless Monday – Every week, go totally meatless on Monday – an international campaign that encourages people to cut out (not eat) meat on Mondays to improve their health and the health of the planet. Reducing meat consumption by 15% (the equivalent of one day a week) lessens the risk of chronic preventable illness and has a strong positive impact on the environment (strongly reduces ecological damages from the activities involved with meat production and transport or distribution). Meatless Monday offers weekly meat-free recipes, articles, tips and news. Meatless Monday is a non-profit initiative of The Monday Campaigns Inc. in association with the Johns Hopkins Bloomberg School of Public Health. The program follows the nutrition guidelines developed by the USDA.

Meatless Monday is part of the Healthy Monday initiative. Healthy Monday encourages Americans to make healthier decisions at the start of every week. Other Healthy Monday campaigns include: Do The Monday 2000, Quit and Stay Quit Monday, Move it Monday, Monday Mile and others.

== Chinese society vegetarian days ==
There is a common practice for some Chinese people to be vegetarian twice a lunar month - the first day and the 15th day of each lunar month. (初一)﹑(十五). The 15th day of each lunar month is the day/night with full moon. Local vegetarian restaurants are particularly busy on those 2 days. The origin of such practice is related to religious beliefs.

== Nine Emperor Gods Festival ==
The Nine Emperor Gods Festival, also known as the Vegetarian Festival, is a nine-day Taoist celebration beginning on the eve of the ninth lunar month of the Chinese calendar, celebrated primarily in Southeast Asian countries such as Malaysia, Singapore, Indonesia and Thailand by the Peranakans (not the entire Overseas Chinese community). The ninth lunar month occurs around World Vegetarian Day.

== See also ==
- International Vegetarian Week
- List of food days
- List of vegetarian and vegan festivals
- List of vegetarian and vegan organizations
- Meat-free days
- Vegan school meal
- Veganuary
- World Vegan Day
