= Adam Blatner =

American psychiatrist (1937–2021)

Adam Blatner (born Howard Blatner, 5 August 1937 – 1 October 2021) was a Life Fellow of the American Psychiatric Association, doubly Board Certified in Child/Adult Psychiatry), a Certified Trainer of Psychodrama and a psychology theorist. He was the author of the book Acting In, first published in 1973, which became the primary textbook for students of Psychodrama. He also wrote a number of other books and dozens of journal articles and chapters in textbooks, including the book (with his wife Allee Blatner) The Art of Play.

Blatner wrote papers and presented talks on a wide range of subjects, including Process philosophy, Postmodernism, and Scriptology. He became close friends with philosopher Charles Hartshorne in the final years of Hartshorne's life, helping him at his home in Austin, Texas.

== Early life and education ==
Howard Blatner was born in Los Angeles in 1937 to parents who had immigrated from Eastern Europe around 1910 due to the persecution of Jews. He was awarded Phi Beta Kappa from the University of California, Berkeley during his Junior year, and then graduated in 1959 with honors in the field of cultural aspects of religion. He attended medical school at the University of California, San Francisco, graduating in 1963. After internship in Los Angeles, Dr. Blatner did specialty training in the psychiatric residency program at the Stanford University Medical Center. While there he discovered the therapeutic role playing approach called Psychodrama, which became one of his sub-specialty interests, integrated with a general exploration of other types of psychotherapy.

== Proponent of psychodrama ==
While serving for three years in the U.S. Air Forces at a base in England as a child and adult psychiatrist, Blatner began writing Acting-In: Practical Applications of Psychodramatic Methods. First published in 1973, the book was translated into ten languages, revised twice, and became a primary textbook in the field of psychodrama.

Later books include The Art of Play: Helping Adults Reclaim Imagination and Spontaneity. co-authored with Allee Blatner (1988), Foundations of Psychodrama: History, Theory, and Practice (1988), Interactive and Improvisational Drama: Varieties of Applied Theatre and Performance. (2007), and Action Explorations: Using Psychodramatic Methods in Non-Therapeutic Settings (2019).

== Personal life ==
Blatner later lived in Palo Alto, California, Georgetown, Texas, and San Luis Obispo, California. His 13-year marriage to Barbara Fisher ended in 1976, and he later married Allee Blatner. His son, David Blatner, became an author and expert in publishing systems; his daughter, Alisa Piette, became a marriage family therapist.

== Additional sources ==
- Official Web site
