= Women and animal advocacy =

Women have played a central role in animal advocacy since the 19th century. The animal advocacy movement – embracing animal rights, animal welfare, and anti-vivisectionism – has been disproportionately initiated and led by women, particularly in the United Kingdom. Women are more likely to support animal rights than men. A 1996 study of adolescents by Linda Pifer suggested that factors that may partially explain this discrepancy include attitudes towards feminism and science, scientific literacy, and the presence of a greater emphasis on "nurturance or compassion" amongst women. Although vegetarianism does not necessarily imply animal advocacy, a 1992 market research study conducted by the Yankelovich research organization concluded that "of the 12.4 million people [in the US] who call themselves vegetarian, 68% are female, while only 32% are male".

== History ==
=== Pre-1800s ===
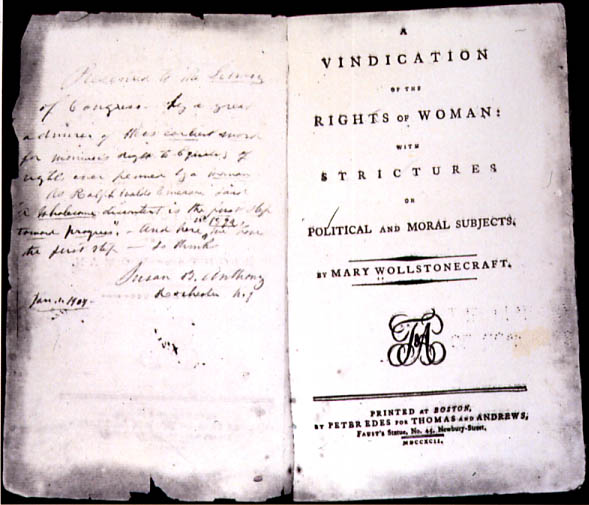
When the British author Mary Wollstonecraft wrote A Vindication of the Rights of Woman in 1792, an anonymous tract, A Vindication of the Rights of Brutes (brutes meaning animals) immediately appeared as a parody.

In 1392 Eleanor of Arborea, Queen (Juighissa) and national heroine of Sardinia, under the jurisdiction conferred by the Carta de Logu became the first ruler in history to grant protection to hawk and falcon nests against illegal hunters. Eleonora's falcon (Falco eleonorae) was later named after her.

Women and animals were often considered equally irrational and inferior in the past. When the British author Mary Wollstonecraft wrote A Vindication of the Rights of Woman in 1792, British philosopher Thomas Taylor responded anonymously in the same year with A Vindication of the Rights of Brutes, in which he claimed that arguments for the oppression or liberation of women applied equally well to animals, intending it as a reductio ad absurdum of Wollstonecraft's position.

=== 1800s ===
Many of the major British animal advocacy groups founded in the late 1800s and early 1900s, all regarded as radical in their time, were founded by women, including the Battersea Dogs' Home (Mary Tealby, 1860), the National Anti-Vivisection Society (Frances Power Cobbe, from Ireland, 1875; it is the world's first anti-vivisection organization), the British Union for the Abolition of Vivisection (Frances Power Cobbe, from Ireland, 1898), and the British Animal Defence and Anti-Vivisection Society (Lizzy Lind af Hageby, from Sweden, and Nina Douglas-Hamilton, Duchess of Hamilton, 1903.)

In 1867 the American philanthropist Caroline Earle White co-founded the Pennsylvania Society for the Prevention of Cruelty to Animals; she also founded its women's branch in 1869. The women's branch of the Pennsylvania Society for the Prevention of Cruelty to Animals, also known as the Women's Humane Society and the Women's Pennsylvania Society for the Prevention of Cruelty to Animals or WPSPCA, opened America's first animal shelter in 1869. WPSPCA successfully passed the Twenty-eight Hour Law in 1871, a mandate that required railway companies to provide facilities to feed, water and rest animals in transit every 28 hours. Immediately WPSPCA sent agents to assess the railways' adherence and prosecute any offenders. In 1896 the Reading Railroad was charged with transporting a shipment of horses for 52 hours without food or water. The railroad was found guilty and the Reading officials were charged $200, setting an important precedent. White viewed the 28-hour law as the crowning achievement of her life. White also founded the American Anti-Vivisection Society (the first anti-vivisection organization founded in the United States) in 1883. In 1909 WPSCA, along with other city humanitarians, secured legislation forbidding the sale or purchase of disabled work horses.

In 1875, Catherine Smithies founded the first Band of Mercy, which promoted teaching children kindness towards non-human animals and led to the Bands of Mercy movement.

In 1877 Anna Sewell's Black Beauty, the first English novel to be written from the perspective of a non-human animal, spurred concern for the welfare of horses. Although the book is now considered a children's classic, Sewell originally wrote it for those who worked with horses. She said "a special aim was to induce kindness, sympathy, and an understanding treatment of horses". In many respects the book can be read as a guide to horse husbandry, stable management and humane training practices for colts. It is considered to have had an effect on reducing cruelty to horses; for example, the use of bearing reins, which are particularly painful for a horse, was one of the practices highlighted in the novel, and in the years after the book's release the reins became less popular and fell out of favor.

In 1878-1879, responding to the moderate positions taken by the German animal protection organizations on animal experimentation, Marie Espérance von Schwartz and two men began to form a dedicated anti-vivisection movement in Germany. In 1879 the anti-vivisectionists clashed with moderate animal protectionists at the German Animal Protection Congress, leading von Schwartz and one of the men to found the International Society for Combat Against Scientific Torture of Animals.

In 1880, the English feminist Anna Kingsford became one of the first English women to graduate in medicine, after studying for her degree in Paris, and the only student at the time to do so without having experimented on animals. She published The Perfect Way in Diet (1881), advocating vegetarianism, and was also vocal in her opposition to animal experiments.

In 1883 Caroline Earle White founded the American Anti-Vivisection Society, which was the first anti-vivisection organization founded in the United States.

In 1889 in England, the Plumage League was founded by Emily Williamson, at her house, as a protest group campaigning against the use of great crested grebe and kittiwake skins and feathers in fur clothing. Also in 1889 the Fur, Fin and Feather Folk (an animal rights group) was founded in England by Eliza Phillips, Etta Lemon, Catherine Hall, Hannah Poland and others. The groups gained in popularity and amalgamated in 1891 to form the Society for the Protection of Birds in London. The Society gained its Royal Charter in 1904. The original members of the Society were all women who campaigned against the fashion of the time for women to wear exotic feathers in hats, and the consequent encouragement of "plume hunting".

In 1896 the Massachusetts Audubon Society (Mass Audubon) was founded by Harriet Hemenway and Minna B. Hall. Women played a critical role in the organization, counting for half of its officers and serving as leaders of most of the local chapters. The group used its political power to have a Massachusetts law passed in 1897 outlawing trade in wild bird feathers as well as a federal law, the 1900 Lacey Act, which prohibits the interstate shipment of animals killed in violation of local laws. The Massachusetts Audubon Society remains independent, but it helped to organize the National Association of Audubon Societies (incorporated in 1905), which later became the National Audubon Society.

British political scientist Robert Garner writes that 70 percent of the membership of the Victoria Street Society (one of the anti-vivisection groups founded by Frances Power Cobbe; it was founded in 1875) were women, as were 70 percent of the membership of the British Royal Society for the Prevention of Cruelty to Animals in 1900.

=== 1900s ===
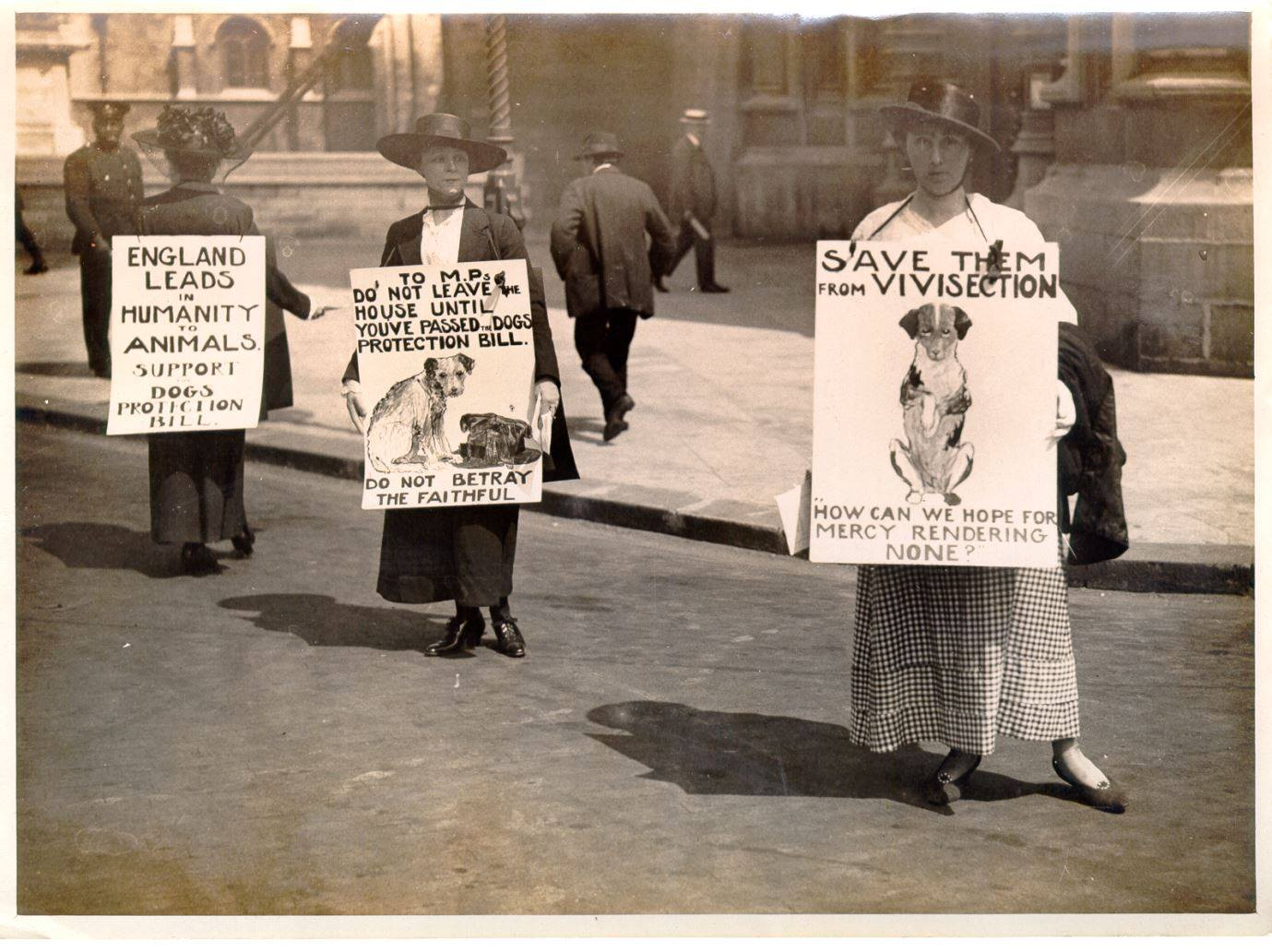
Anti-vivisection campaigners in 1903

The British Animal Defence and Anti-Vivisection Society came to widespread attention during the Brown Dog affair (1903–1910), which began when Lizzy Lind af Hageby infiltrated the vivisection in University College London of a brown terrier dog. The subsequent description of the experiment in her book, The Shambles of Science (1903) — in which she wrote that the dog had been conscious throughout and in pain – led to a protracted scandal and a libel case, which the accused researcher won. The affair however continued for several years, making a name both for Lind af Hageby and for the society. Australian writer and academic Coral Lansbury writes that the suffragist movement in the United Kingdom became closely linked with the anti-vivisection movement. Writing about the Brown Dog affair, she argues that the iconography of vivisection struck a chord with women. The vivisected dog muzzled and strapped to the operating board, she argues, was a symbolic reminder of the suffragette on hunger strike restrained and force-fed in Brixton Prison, as well as women strapped into the gynaecologist's chair by their male doctors, for childbirth, for sterilization, as a cure for "hysteria", and as objects of study by male medical students.

In 1908, Diana Belais founded the New York Anti-Vivisection Society.

In 1927, Jessey Wade founded the Cats Protection League. In 1932 she co-founded the National Society for the Abolition of Cruel Sports.

The Vegan Society, a registered charity and the oldest vegan society in the world, was founded in the United Kingdom in November 1944 by Dorothy Watson and her husband Donald Watson, along with four friends — Elsie Shrigley, Fay K. Henderson and her husband G.A. Henderson among them. The founding of the Vegan Society is celebrated annually on 1 November, World Vegan Day. The day was established in 1994 by Louise Wallis, the then President and Chair. However, the founding of the Vegan Society is thought to have been either 5 or 12 November 1944.

Anna Briggs founded the National Humane Education Society in 1948. The first vegan society in the United States was founded in 1948 by Catherine Nimmo and Rubin Abramowitz in California, who distributed Donald Watson's newsletter.

The earliest documented practice of trap-neuter-return was in the 1950s, led by animal activist Ruth Plant in the U.K. In 1951, the Animal Welfare Institute was founded by Christine Stevens.

On November 22, 1954, the Humane Society of the United States was founded by Marcia Glaser, Helen Jones, and two men.

Also in the United States, Velma Bronn Johnston initiated a massive letter-writing campaign by students to Senators and other Congress members, and on September 8, 1959, the campaign resulted in the federal legislature passing Public Law 86-234, which banned the poisoning of watering holes frequented by wild equids and the use of air and land vehicles in hunting and capturing free-roaming horses for sale and slaughter. This became known as the Wild Horse Annie Act. Johnston was also known as Wild Horse Annie. However, passage of the Wild Horse Annie Act did not alleviate the concerns of free-roaming horse advocates, who continued to lobby for federal rather than state control over the disposition of free-roaming horses. Since most horses in the desert regions were recently descended from ranchers' horses, ownership of the free-roaming herds was contentious, and ranchers continued to use airplanes to gather them. Johnston continued her campaign, and in 1971, the 92nd United States Congress unanimously passed the Wild and Free-Roaming Horses and Burros Act of 1971. It was signed into law by then-President Richard Nixon on December 15, 1971. The act prohibited capture, injury, or disturbance of free-roaming horses and burros.

In 1962 the Animal Welfare Board of India was founded by Rukmini Devi Arundale.

In 1964 the British author Ruth Harrison published Animal Machines, an influential critique of factory farming, and on October 10, 1965, the British novelist Brigid Brophy had an article, "The Rights of Animals", published in The Sunday Times. Brophy wrote:

The relationship of homo sapiens to the other animals is one of unremitting exploitation. We employ their work; we eat and wear them. We exploit them to serve our superstitions: whereas we used to sacrifice them to our gods and tear out their entrails in order to foresee the future, we now sacrifice them to science, and experiment on their entrail in the hope—or on the mere offchance—that we might thereby see a little more clearly into the present ... To us it seems incredible that the Greek philosophers should have scanned so deeply into right and wrong and yet never noticed the immorality of slavery. Perhaps 3000 years from now it will seem equally incredible that we do not notice the immorality of our own oppression of animals.

British political scientist Robert Garner writes that Ruth Harrison's book and Brigid Brophy's article led to an explosion of interest in the relationship between humans and nonhumans. Largely due to the outcry following Animal Machines, British Parliament formed the Brambell Committee to investigate animal welfare. The Committee concluded that animals should be afforded the Five Freedoms, which consist of the animal's freedom to "have sufficient freedom of movement to be able without difficulty to turn around, groom itself, get up, lie down, [and] stretch its limbs." As well, Brophy's article was discovered in or around 1969 by a group of postgraduate philosophy students at the University of Oxford, Roslind and Stanley Godlovitch (wife and husband from Canada), John Harris, and David Wood, now known as the Oxford Group. They decided to put together a symposium to discuss the theory of animal rights. Around the same time, the British writer Richard D. Ryder wrote several letters to The Daily Telegraph criticizing animal experimentation; these letters were seen by Brophy, who put Ryder in touch with the Godlovitches and Harris. Harrison, Brophy, and Ryder subsequently became contributors to the Godlovitches' symposium, which was published in 1971 as Animals, Men and Morals: An Inquiry into the Maltreatment of Non-humans (edited by Roslind and Stanley Godlovitch and John Harris).

In the mid-1960s, English former model Celia Hammond gained publicity for her trap-neuter-return work "at a time when euthanasia of feral cats was considered the only option." Hammond "fought many battles with local authorities, hospitals, environmental health departments" but stated that she succeeded over the years in showing that control "could be achieved by neutering and not killing." In 1986 she founded the Celia Hammond Animal Trust with the aim of opening a low-cost neutering clinic to control the feral animal population. The first of these clinics opened in Lewisham in 1995, and a second opened in Canning Town in 1999. The Celia Hammond Animal Trust also runs a sanctuary in Brede, East Sussex, for animals which need new homes. In addition to neutering animals, the clinics (and sanctuary) also help to rescue and rehome animals, and now find homes for thousands of cats each year.

In 1973 Dr. Shirley McGreal founded the International Primate Protection League in Thailand.

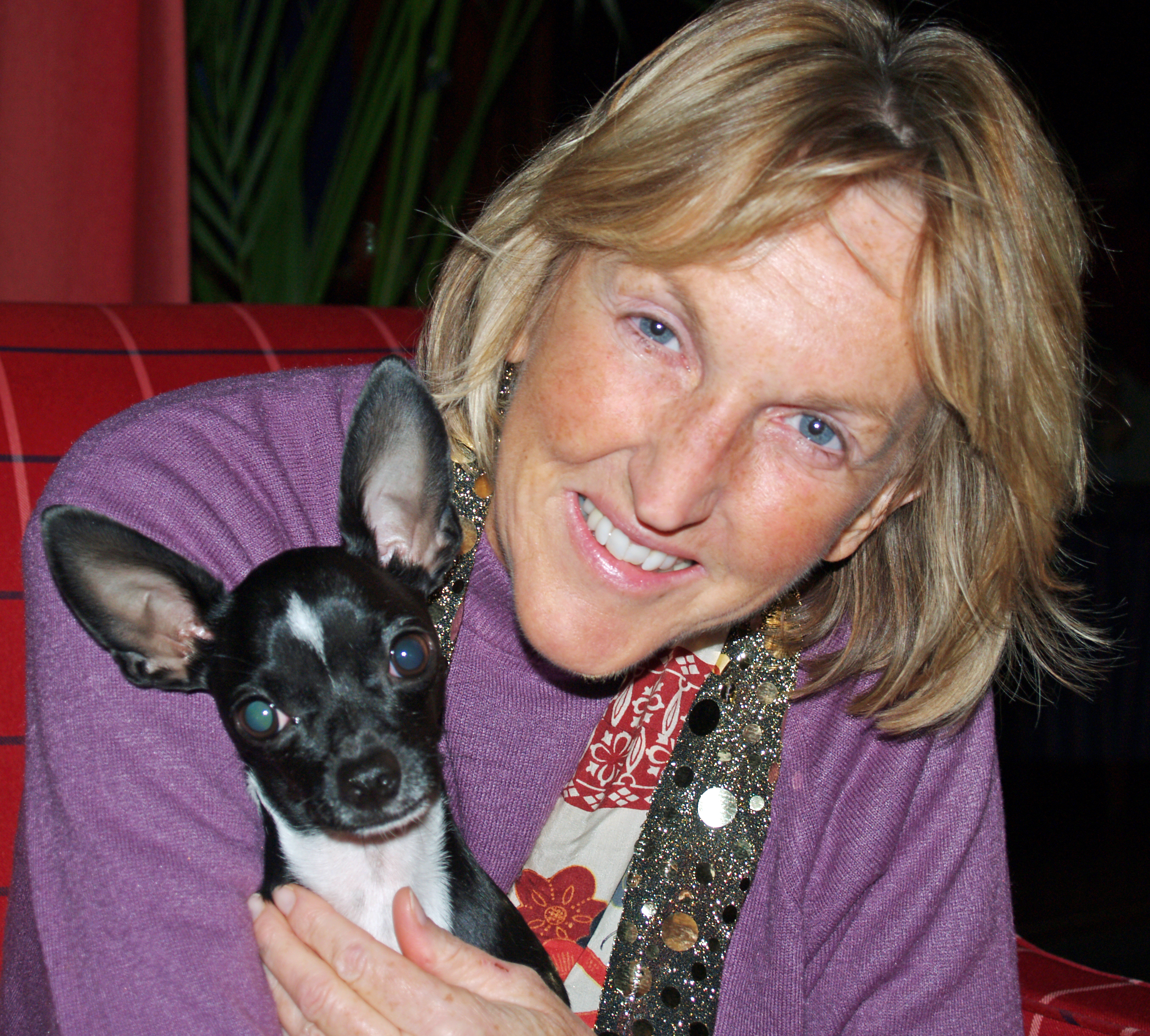
Ingrid Newkirk, co-founder of People for the Ethical Treatment of Animals.

In 1980 the English-born British/American animal rights activist Ingrid Newkirk co-founded People for the Ethical Treatment of Animals.

Also in 1980 was the first Action for Life conference for animal rights, which was attended by a number of pioneers in the animal rights movement, including Ingrid Newkirk.

In 1981 Feminists for Animal Rights was founded in California; it became a nationwide organization in the following years and was active nationwide for over two decades, but is now defunct. In the same year, Priscilla Cohn published Etica aplicada ("Applied Ethics"), written with José Ferrater Mora, containing the first essay on animal rights published in Spain.

In 1984 Virginia McKenna OBE founded the Born Free Foundation together with her husband Bill Travers OBE and their son Will Travers OBE. The Born Free Foundation is an international wildlife charity that works worldwide to attempt to save lives, stop suffering and protect species in the wild.

A breakaway group from The Vegan Society, the Movement for Compassionate Living, was founded in 1984 by the former Vegan Society Secretary Kathleen Jannaway and her husband Jack. The Movement for Compassionate Living promotes veganism and sustainable living.

In 1986, Lorri Houston co-founded Farm Sanctuary, America's first shelter for farm animals.

In 1990, the American author Carol J. Adams published her influential book The Sexual Politics of Meat: A Feminist-Vegetarian Critical Theory, which discusses the connections between feminism and vegetarianism and patriarchy and meat eating, historically and through the reading of literary texts. In the same year, during the March for Animals in Washington, D.C. – the largest animal rights demonstration held until then in the United States – most of the participants were women, but most of the platform speakers were men. Also that year, Karen Davis founded United Poultry Concerns a non-profit animal rights organization in the United States that addresses the treatment of poultry, including chickens, ducks and turkeys, in food production, science, education, entertainment, and human companionship situations.

In 1992 People for Animals (PFA), also known as People for Animals India, India's largest animal welfare organization, was founded by Maneka Gandhi, who later became its chairperson.

In 1994 Louise Wallis, then President and Chair of the Vegan Society, founded World Vegan Day to commemorate the society's 50th anniversary. Vegans around the world now join to celebrate animal rights every World Vegan Day, held annually on November 1. However, the actual founding of the Vegan Society is thought to have been either 5 or 12 November 1944.

In 1994 Viva! was founded in the United Kingdom by Juliet Gellately. The organisation carries out undercover investigations of factory farms, as well as producing campaigns and resources on veganism.

In 1998 Animals Asia was founded by Jill Robinson MBE; it works to end the bear bile trade in Asia. The charity has two bear sanctuaries in China and Vietnam and has rescued over 500 bears. It also works to end the trade in cats and dogs as food in China and Vietnam, and campaigns for the end of abusive captive animal practices in safari parks and zoos in Asia.

=== 2000s ===
In 2006 in the Netherlands, Marianne Thieme and Esther Ouwehand were elected to parliament representing the Party for Animals.

In 2008, Brigitte Gothière co-founded L214, a French animal rights organization which spreads awareness of animal suffering in slaughterhouses using graphic footage.

In 2015, Jo-Anne McArthur (We Animals) and Keri Cronin (Department of Visual Arts, Brock University), launched The Unbound Project, a multimedia and book project that celebrates the women who have been at the forefront of animal advocacy around the globe.

Women have also featured prominently in actions carried out in the name of the Animal Liberation Front and the Hunt Saboteurs Association.

== See also ==
- Women and vegetarianism and veganism advocacy
- List of animal rights advocates
- Human–animal bonding
