= Erica Meier =

American animal-rights advocate

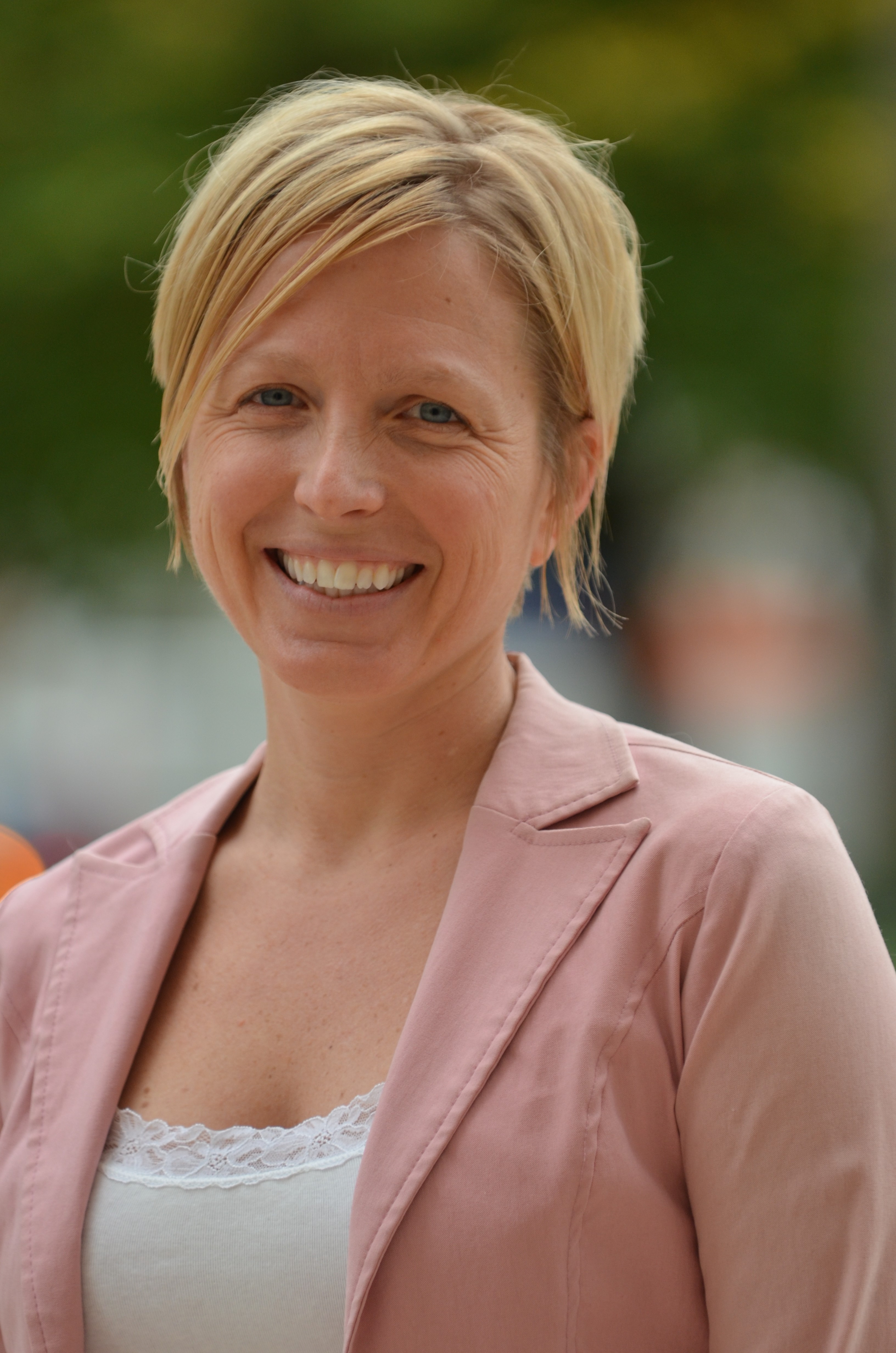
- Erica Meier in 2016
- Occupation: Animal rights advocate
- Years active: 2005–present
- Awards: 2013 inductee into the Animal Rights Hall of Fame

Erica Meier is an American animal rights advocate and was the president and executive director of Animal Outlook (previously known as Compassion Over Killing) from 2005 to 2021.

== Early life and career beginnings ==
Meier's father owned a small meat-packing company. However, her strong connection to animals made her uncomfortable with eating meat. In high school, she learned more about how meat production can be harmful to the planet, and she decided to become vegetarian. When she later learned about animal mistreatment on factory farms and the conditions for dairy cows and egg-laying hens, she became vegan. This led her to switch her career interests from environmental protection to animal protection.

Meier interned with PETA in college and spent three years working there after graduating. She developed an interest in humane law enforcement and moved to Washington, D.C. to work as an animal control officer for the Washington Humane Society, where she rescued animals and helped to enforce anti-cruelty laws.

== Career ==
In 2005, Meier became animal advocacy organization Animal Outlook's president and executive director. Animal Outlook's work is focused on the protection of farmed animals, and the organization has become best known for its investigations into the conditions facing animals on factory farms.

Meier led Animal Outlook through several successful campaigns, including ending the egg industry's use of "Animal Care Certified" claims that could mislead consumers, as well as persuading companies like Dunkin' Donuts, Starbucks, and Subway to offer vegan options. She also persuaded vegetarian brands Boca Burger, Lightlife, Morningstar Farms, and Quorn to eliminate or reduce their use of eggs in their products.

Meier was an outspoken leader of Animal Outlook. She delivered speeches at events including the Animal Rights National Conference, the Maryland Animal Law Symposium, the Forum on Industrial Animal Farming hosted by the Harvard Food Law & Policy Clinic, the National Conference to End Factory Farming, and various vegetarian festivals. She also appeared in major news outlets including CNN, ABC's Nightline, the Associated Press, the Los Angeles Times, and Reuters.

Meier provided information used in Mark Hawthorne's book Striking at the Roots: A Practical Guide to Animal Activism, and she has been featured in documentary films, such as Speciesism: The Movie (2013), Meat the Future (2020), and Meat Me Halfway (2021).

Meier is a frequent contributor to HuffPost and VegNews, and she has written for The New York Times.

== Personal life ==
Meier has been vegan since college.

In 2013, Meier was inducted into the Animal Rights Hall of Fame.
