= Hogwood: A Modern Horror Story =

2020 UK documentary

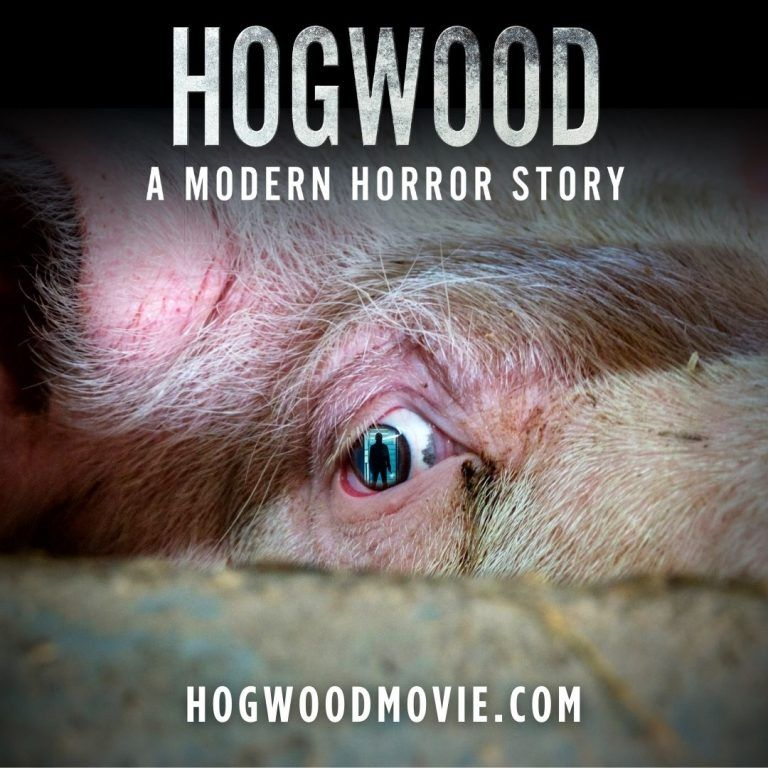
- Movie poster for Hogwood: a modern horror story
- Directed by: Tony Wardle
- Produced by: Juliet Gellatley; Roisin McAuley (II)
- Starring: Jerome Flynn; Juliet Gellatley
- Narrated by: Jerome Flynn
- Cinematography: Joe Murray; Gary Thomas
- Edited by: Gary Thomas; Tony Wardle
- Music by: Billy Cowie
- Production company: Vivacity Films
- Release date: 2020
- Running time: 35
- Country: United Kingdom
- Language: English

Hogwood: A Modern Horror Story is a 2020 documentary film focussing on an undercover investigation of a UK pig farm. The film was created by UK charity Viva!, directed by Tony Wardle and presented by Jerome Flynn.

The film explores issues with factory farming such as animal cruelty and disease outbreaks and suggests it is a leading cause of climate change.

== Synopsis ==
The documentary follows a team of undercover investigators as they explore Hogwood, a pig farm based in Warwickshire, England, as well as other farms in the UK. The footage shown throughout the film suggests evidence of overcrowding, mutilation, sick and injured pigs, dead pigs, and cannibalism.

== Background ==
Hogwood was a Red Tractor approved pig farm supplying UK supermarket Tesco and food producer Cranswick plc.

Between 2017 and 2019, Viva! investigated Hogwood four times obtaining the footage shown in the 2020 documentary. During that time, Viva! held a number of protests including a nationwide day of action resulting in over 300 demonstrations outside Tesco stores to spread awareness to the public and put pressure on Tesco and Red Tractor to drop the farm as a supplier.

On 19 July 2019, in response to the footage obtained by Viva!'s fourth and final investigation, Red Tractor suspended Hogwood Farm's certification pending further investigation. Shortly afterwards, Tesco and Cranswick plc dropped Hogwood as a supplier.

== Production ==
The film was crowdfunded through Viva!’s website with 930 supporters contributing a total of £42,501, exceeding their target by 42%.

== Broadcast and streaming ==
The film was initially released in June 2020 on Amazon Prime Video, Apple TV, and Google Play. In October 2022, it was released on Netflix.

== Featured individuals ==
- Jerome Flynn (actor, singer, activist)
- Juliet Gellatley (activist, author)
- Joseph Poore (environmental researcher)
- Josh Cullimore (physician)
- Alice Brough (veterinarian, activist)

== Awards and nominations ==
Year	Award	Category	Result	Ref.
2020	British Documentary Film Festival	The Wild Animal Award	Won	
2020	London Independent Film Awards	Best Documentary Short	Won	
2020	Latitude Film Awards	Documentary Short Silver Award	Won	
2020	Liverpool Underground Film Festival	Best Documentary	Won	
2020	London City Film Awards	Best Documentary	Nominated	
2020	Edinburgh Independent Film Awards	Best Documentary	Nominated	
2020	International Vegan Film Festival	Best Documentary	Nominated	

== See also ==
- List of vegan media
- Veganism
- Intensive animal farming
- Environmental impact of meat production
