= Legal Impact for Chickens =

American animal law nonprofit

- Abbreviation: LIC
- Formation: June 11, 2021; 5 years ago
- Founder: Alene Anello
- Type: Nonprofit
- Tax ID no.: EIN 871596873
- Legal status: 501(c)(3) organization
- Headquarters: Sacramento, California
- Region served: United States
- Methods: Litigation; investigation; education
- President: Alene Anello
- Revenue: $1,917,001 (2024)
- Website: legalimpactforchickens.org

Legal Impact for Chickens (LIC) is an American animal law nonprofit organization that uses litigation concerning the treatment of chickens and other farmed animals in the factory farming sector. Founded in 2021 by lawyer Alene Anello, the organization focuses on the enforcement of existing animal welfare laws through civil lawsuits, investigations, and public education. LIC has brought cases against companies including Costco, Case Farms, Alexandre Family Farm, and Tyson Foods, and has represented advocacy groups including Animal Outlook in legal actions concerning alleged animal cruelty and marketing claims.

The organization has been reviewed by Animal Charity Evaluators and covered by outlets including Prospect, CBS News, The Independent, and Vox. Agribusiness groups have characterized LIC's lawsuits as part of broader animal rights activism against animal agriculture.

== History ==
Legal Impact for Chickens (LIC) was founded on June 11, 2021, by Alene Anello, a Harvard Law School graduate. Originally based in San Francisco, it is now based in Sacramento. LIC received 501(c)(3) tax-exempt status in March 2022 as an alliances and advocacy organization (NTEE).

LIC says it was established to address underenforcement of animal welfare laws on factory farms, especially for chickens raised for meat and eggs. The organization cites the scale of the poultry industry, including approximately nine billion chickens raised and slaughtered for food each year in the United States, nearly all on factory farms.

LIC has brought lawsuits including a case against Costco alleging neglect of chickens raised for its rotisserie products. That lawsuit received coverage from news outlets and animal advocacy organizations.

== Methods and focus ==
LIC primarily uses civil litigation relating to the welfare of farmed animals in the United States, with a focus on chickens. Its activities include drafting legal briefs, representing plaintiffs in court, negotiating settlements, and preparing expert witnesses. In 2023, approximately 68% of the organization's spending was allocated to litigation, 24% to investigations, and 8% to educational programs.

The organization describes its mission as "to make factory-farm cruelty a liability" by enforcing existing animal welfare laws and holding companies accountable for violations. According to Animal Charity Evaluators, LIC selects cases based on their expected effect on animals and their likelihood of legal success.

LIC also conducts educational and outreach work on animal law. According to founder Alene Anello, "animals, workers, and companies themselves are better off when companies treat animals humanely, and when everyone follows the law".

== Funding ==
In October 2022, Open Philanthropy awarded LIC a $300,000 grant over two years to support lawsuits against companies and executives accused of violating state-level animal cruelty laws or their own animal welfare pledges. In December 2024, Open Philanthropy provided a second $300,000 grant to continue supporting the organization's farm animal welfare litigation.

In 2024, LIC received a $41,500 grant from California ChangeLawyers through its Legal Empowerment Fund to support civil litigation concerning animal welfare and the poultry industry. The grant description stated that the funding related to conditions for poultry workers, contract growers, and animals, and said that most industry workers are people of color, many are women, and nearly one-third are immigrants.

== Litigation ==
=== Costco shareholder derivative suit (Iowa and Nebraska) ===
LIC represented two Costco shareholders in a 2022 lawsuit over chickens used for Costco's rotisserie products. The suit alleged that Costco had engaged in "illegal neglect and abandonment" by intentionally breeding chickens that grew so large that many could not stand and died. According to LIC, the court granted a motion to dismiss the suit in March 2023, ending the case in Costco's favor.

=== Case Farms litigation (North Carolina) ===
LIC sued poultry producer and KFC supplier Case Farms in May 2023 over alleged animal cruelty violations. A lower court dismissed the case before it was brought to the North Carolina Supreme Court. Case Farms argued in July 2025 that animal cruelty regulations do not apply to commercial operations such as theirs. LIC argued that lawful commercial operations are undermined by unlawful actions, including the alleged animal cruelty and illegal slaughter at issue in the case.

=== Alexandre Family Farm case (California) ===
In 2024, LIC sued a Northern California dairy operator over alleged animal cruelty. According to the Times-Standard, the allegations included "salting the eyeballs of diseased cows, dragging them across concrete with heavy machinery, and cutting the teats off cows without anesthesia". The case followed a report by Farm Forward, an animal welfare nonprofit. In September 2025, the California Courts of Appeal denied a writ of mandate filed by Alexandre Family Farm, which had argued that LIC lacked standing. The decision allowed LIC's case to continue.

=== Harvey's Market settlement (Washington, DC) ===
In 2024, LIC represented Animal Outlook in a case against Harvey's Market in Washington, DC. Animal Outlook argued that the butcher shop misled consumers by using phrases including "humanely raised stock" and "free range" while selling foie gras. In a settlement finalized in June 2025, Harvey's Market agreed to permanently stop selling foie gras.

=== Tyson Foods books and records demand (Delaware) ===
A shareholder sued Tyson Foods in August 2025 for the release of records on worker safety, alleged child labor violations, and the treatment of chickens on contract farms. LIC provided three of the five attorneys representing the shareholder. According to LIC, shareholders are entitled to records from the company to investigate alleged wrongdoing. LIC also said that disclosure could show whether Tyson had the situation under control.

=== Foster Farms suit (California) ===
In May 2026, LIC directly filed a lawsuit against Foster Farms, alleging a history of animal abuse. In 2024, an undercover investigation by Animal Outlook revealed alleged animal cruelty and poor living conditions. Foster Farms released a statement following this to confirm individuals had intentionally violated their animal-welfare standards, terminated their contracts, and referred them to police. In the suit LIC alleges that this behavior continued regardless. Under California’s Corporations Code Section 10404, societies for the prevention of cruelty to animals such as LIC can file such complaints directly.

== Leadership ==
=== President ===
Alene Anello is the founder and president of LIC. She graduated from Harvard College in 2010 and later earned her J.D. degree from Harvard Law School. Before founding LIC, Anello worked for People for the Ethical Treatment of Animals (PETA), clerked for a federal judge, and held positions at the Animal Legal Defense Fund and the Good Food Institute. In 2023, she told Prospect that she established LIC to "defend the animals we treat more cruelly than any other".

Anello has cited the deaths of her two cockatiel companions as a personal motivation for advocating on behalf of farmed birds and other animals. She has also identified the philosophy of effective altruism as an influence on her approach.

=== Leadership team and board ===
As of 2025, LIC's leadership team includes managing attorney Drew Givens and staff attorney Kathryn Evans. The organization's board of directors is chaired by Stephanie Ahart, with Sami Nabulsi serving as treasurer, Alicia Rodriguez as a board member, and Tyler Lobdell as secretary.

== Reception ==
=== Charity assessments ===
In 2023, Animal Charity Evaluators (ACE) included LIC among its recommended charities following its annual evaluation process. ACE's review assessed LIC as focusing exclusively on farmed animals, particularly chickens, and using litigation, corporate outreach, and education as its central interventions. It found LIC's programs to have high impact potential and noted staff engagement and management processes. The review also estimated that LIC could use up to $1 million in additional funding through 2025. In 2024, ACE again listed LIC among its recommended charities, citing its use of litigation concerning farmed animal welfare in the United States. In June 2025, ACE announced that LIC was selected for re-evaluation as one of six current recommended charities being reviewed before the expiration of their two-year recommendation status.

As of 2025, Charity Navigator has awarded LIC a four-star rating with an overall score of 100%, based on its performance in impact, measurement, leadership, and adaptability. The organization also holds Candid's Gold Seal of Transparency for 2025.

=== Media coverage ===
The 2022 shareholder derivative lawsuit Smith v. Vachris, filed by LIC against Costco executives over the treatment of chickens used for the retailer's rotisserie products, received coverage from CBS News, The Independent, The Washington Post, and the New York Post.

In December 2024, Vox mentioned LIC in an article on animal charities evaluated by ACE. The article described the organization as working to enforce animal cruelty laws in the United States through litigation against companies that violate animal welfare commitments. It also described the organization's strategy as making cruelty on factory farms a legal liability.

In September 2025, Current Affairs included LIC in its special "Animals Issue", which focused on animal welfare and advocacy.

== Criticism ==
The agricultural consulting firm AGPROfessionals has described LIC as an animal rights organization rather than an animal welfare group and argued that its shareholder lawsuit against Tyson Foods was intended "to end animal agriculture through the use of corporate law as a weapon".

The Animal Agriculture Alliance, an industry advocacy organization, lists LIC among the animal rights groups it monitors through its "Monitoring Activism" initiative, which tracks what it describes as activist efforts to influence consumer perceptions of animal agriculture.

== See also ==
- Animal law organizations
- Animal welfare in the United States
- United Poultry Concerns
- Shareholder activism
