= Lauren Ornelas =

American animal rights advocate

lauren T. Ornelas
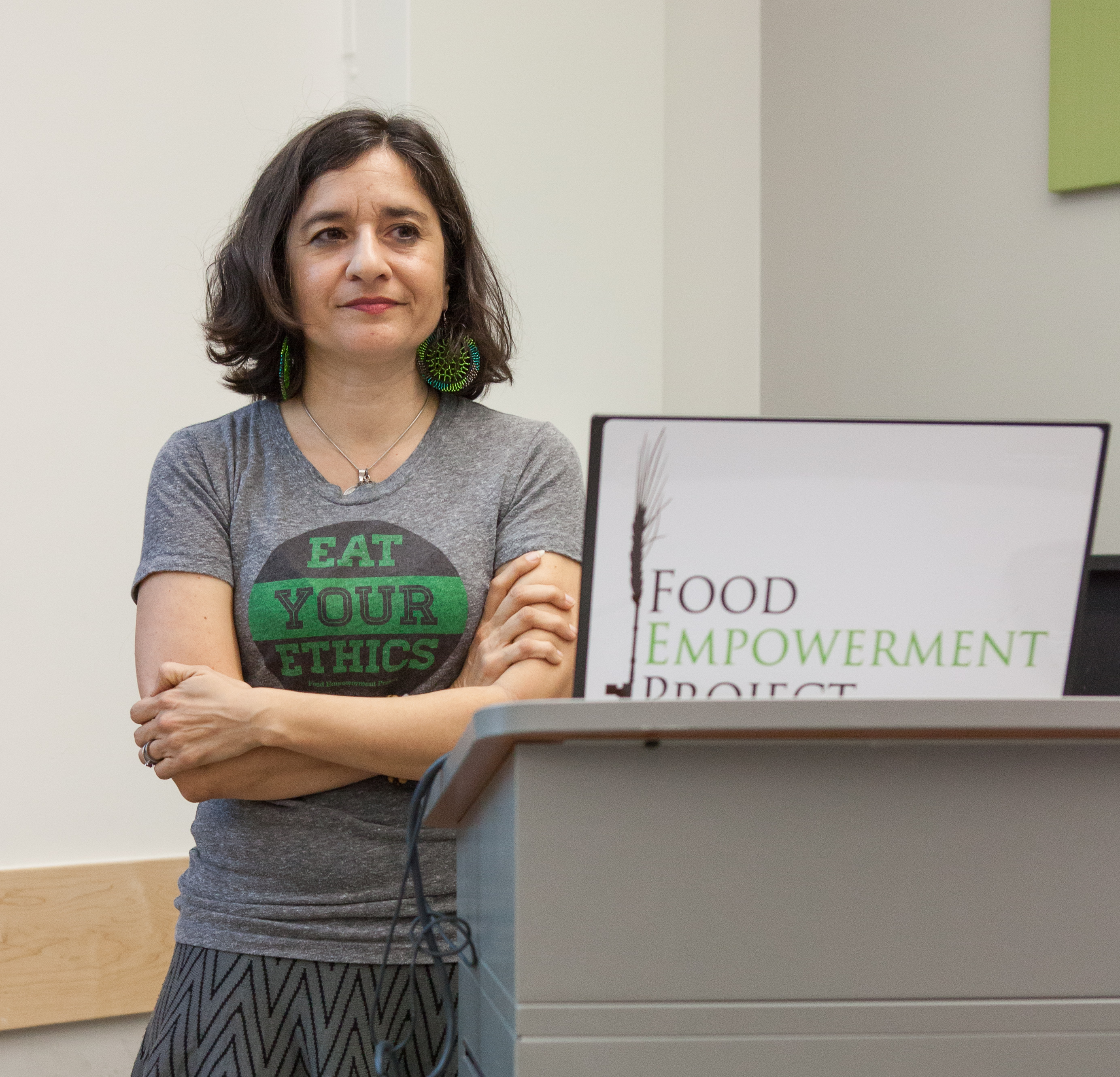
- Ornelas in 2016 at UC Berkeley
- Born: San Antonio, Texas, U.S.
- Education: St. Edward's University
- Organization: Food Empowerment Project
- Spouse: Mark Hawthorne (m. 2012)

Lauren T. Ornelas is an American animal rights advocate for more than 20 years and is the founder of the Food Empowerment Project.

== Background and education ==
Ornelas was born in San Antonio, Texas, and grew up in Texas, where she became a vegetarian as a child. She attended Douglas MacArthur High School in San Antonio from 1984 to 1988. When in high school, she became a vegan and started her first animal rights group.

Ornelas studied at St. Edward's University in Austin from 1990-1993, majoring in communications and minoring in political science. In 1992, she founded the St. Edwards Animals Rights Society, which transitioned into Action for Animals after she graduated. While in college, nuns tore down her "Go Veggie" posters. In the 1992-93 academic year, Ornelas was a recipient of the St. Edward's University Presidential Award.

Ornelas received her Bachelor of Arts degree from St. Edward's. She continued her work for animals while attending university and eventually became the National Coordinator for In Defense of Animals.

== Career ==
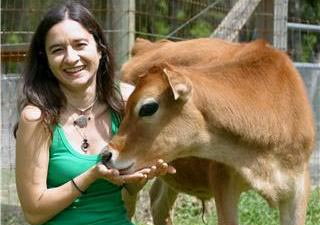
Ornelas in 2008

Ornelas worked for In Defense of Animals from 1995 to 1999. Viva! UK then asked Ornelas to start and run Viva! USA, a national nonprofit vegan advocacy organization, where she did numerous factory farm investigations. Ornelas ran Viva!USA from February 1999 to April 2006. As Viva! USA's executive director, in cooperation with activists across the country, she also brought corporate changes to such powerful companies as Whole Foods Market, Trader Joe's, and Pier 1 Imports.

In 2003, Ornelas appeared at the annual shareholder meeting of Whole Foods Market and spoke about the treatment and the lives of the ducks that were killed to be sold in Whole Foods stores. Whole Foods CEO John Mackey was present and initially responded to Ornelas's speech dismissively. But a subsequent sequence of e-mails between Ornelas and Mackey, plus Mackey's reading of a dozen books on animal agriculture, resulted in Mackey becoming vegan (from vegetarian).

In a 2004 address to the Empty Cages Conference, Ornelas described the results of Viva!USA's campaign to get grocery stores to stop selling duck meat:

"Grocery store chains, Earth Fare, Huckleberries, our local co-ops and Wild Oats either stopped buying duck meat from the farms we investigated or duck meat altogether. In fact, Trader Joe's stopped carrying all duck meat and put a statement on their website testifying to the fact that this was done because their customers were concerned about the treatment of the animals. With Trader Joe's the goal of our campaign was achieved."

In 2006, Ornelas' desire to address a variety of social justice issues came to fruition with the opportunity to give a talk "Corporate Animal Farms: Exploiting Animals, Workers and the Environment, and Why You Should Work to Stop It" at the World Social Forum in Caracas, Venezuela. It was in Caracas that she noted that many of the issues being discussed revolved around food, from labor and immigration issues to water, animals, and the environment. Ornelas knew that being more responsible about what we eat was key to fighting injustice, and her idea for the Food Empowerment Project (F.E.P.) was born. Ornelas is the founder and executive director of F.E.P., a non-profit organization.

Ornelas campaigns against chocolate produced by labor of West African slaves. "How can we say vegan chocolate is cruelty-free just because it doesn't contain animal products? If it comes from the blood and sweat of slaves in West Africa —children, no less—it's certainly not cruelty-free," she says.

Ornelas was one of several people who provided information used in the writing of the book Striking at the Roots: A Practical Guide to Animal Activism (2008) by Mark Hawthorne. She later married Hawthorne; they live in northern California.

Ornelas wrote a chapter of Lisa Kemmerer's 2011 anthology Sister Species: Women, Animals, and Social Justice.

In California's 2008 Proposition 2 campaign, Ornelas was the Santa Clara County director of the YES ON 2 campaign. After Prop 2 won, Ornelas and other Prop 2 activists formed Santa Clara County Activists for Animals.

Ornelas was Campaigns Director for Silicon Valley Toxics Coalition from March 2007 to July 2013.

Ornelas gave a talk on "The Power of Our Food Choices" at TEDxGoldenGatePark in San Francisco on October 9, 2013.

Ornelas appeared in the 2014 documentary film, Cowspiracy: The Sustainability Secret.

== See also ==
- Silicon Valley Toxics Coalition
- California Proposition 2 (2008)
- Human rights
- Women and animal advocacy
