= Karen Davis (activist) =

American animal rights activist (1944–2023)

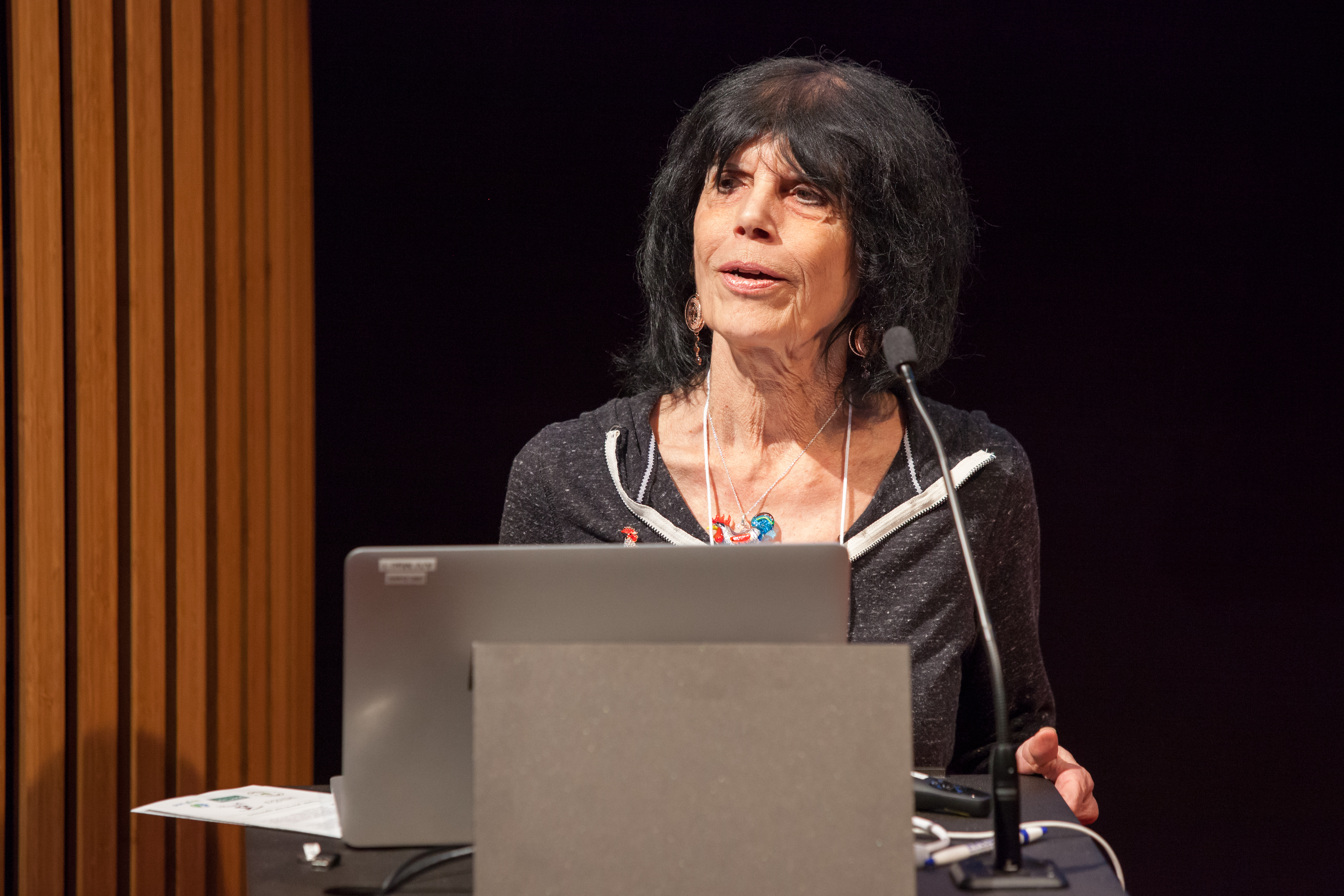
- Davis in 2018
- Born: February 4, 1944; Altoona, Pennsylvania, U.S.
- Died: November 4, 2023 (aged 79); Machipongo, Virginia, U.S.
- Education: PhD in English, University of Maryland, College Park
- Alma mater: University of Maryland, College Park
- Occupations: Writer, animal rights advocate
- Years active: 1983–2023
- Spouse: George Allan Cate (deceased)
- Parent(s): Amos and Mary Elizabeth Davis
- Relatives: Brothers: Tim Davis, Amos Davis, Andrew Davis
- Website: United Poultry Concerns

Karen Davis (February 4, 1944 – November 4, 2023) was an American animal rights advocate, and president of United Poultry Concerns, a non-profit organization founded in 1990 to address the treatment of domestic fowl—including chickens, turkeys, and ducks—in factory farming. Davis also maintained a sanctuary.

Davis was the author of several books on veganism and animal rights, including Prisoned Chickens, Poisoned Eggs: An Inside Look at the Modern Poultry Industry (1997) and The Holocaust and the Henmaid's Tale: A Case for Comparing Atrocities (2005). Karen Davis also wrote the foreword to Michael Lanfield's book, The Interconnectedness of Life, which was released December 6, 2014.

== Early life and education ==
Karen Davis was born in Altoona, Pennsylvania; her parents were Mary Elizabeth Davis, a French tutor, and Amos Davis, an attorney and hunter. Amos was the Blair County District attorney from 1966 to 1975.

Davis graduated from Hollidaysburg Area High School in 1962. She studied for her undergraduate degree at Westminster College in New Wilmington, Pennsylvania.

While in college, she became extremely unsettled by stories of concentration camps and eventually dropped out, according her obituary in the Wall Street Journal.

Davis obtained her PhD in English from the University of Maryland, College Park. She also taught English at the University of Maryland while she started United Poultry Concerns.

== Activism ==
"Just as I became obsessed with concentration camps in the early 1960s, so in the early 1970s I began to agonize over the suffering and abuse of nonhuman animals," Davis wrote, per the Wall Street Journal.

At the time, she was more or less alone in advocating the rights of poultry. Despite this, Davis “never missed an opportunity to show people that these were intelligent, loving, beautiful animals," Ingrid Newkirk, the founder of PETA, told the Journal. "She was one of the original pioneers who changed the conversation around chickens.”

She regularly addressed the annual National Animal Rights conferences, and was inducted in July 2002 into the Animal Rights Hall of Fame "for outstanding contributions to animal liberation." Since 1999, she and United Poultry Concerns hosted 19 conferences on farmed animal-vegan advocacy issues.

Davis launched a campaign against National Public Radio's This American Life for its annual "Poultry Slam" show, arguing that host Ira Glass was contributing to the poor treatment and slaughter of chickens and turkeys. Eventually, Glass visited Davis's sanctuary and announced on the Late Show with David Letterman in 2008 that he had become a vegetarian thanks to Davis.

Davis was one of several people who provided information used in the writing of the book Striking at the Roots: A Practical Guide to Animal Activism (2008) by Mark Hawthorne.

Davis paid for an advertisement in The New York Times in protest at the practice of killing chickens in the streets of New York during the Yom Kippur ritual of kapparot.

== Personal life and death ==
Davis married George Allan Cate. She had three brothers: Tim Davis of Palo Alto, California, Amos Davis of Baton Rouge, Louisiana, and Andrew Davis of Shippensburg, Pennsylvania.

Davis was sick for two years after a fall in 2021, during which she kept her illness private. She died at the UPC sanctuary on November 4, 2023, at the age of 79.

== Publications ==
Books

- A Home for Henny. United Poultry Concerns, 1996 (children's book).
- Instead of Chicken, Instead of Turkey: A Poultryless "Poultry" Potpourri. Book Publishing Co., 1999. ISBN 978-1570670831
- More Than a Meal: The Turkey in History, Myth, Ritual, and Reality. Lantern Books, 2001. ISBN 978-1930051881
- The Holocaust and the Henmaid’s Tale: A Case for Comparing Atrocities. Lantern Books, 2005. ISBN 978-1590560914
- Prisoned Chickens, Poisoned Eggs: An Inside Look at the Modern Poultry Industry. Book Publishing Co., Revised edition, 2009. ISBN 978-1570672293
- For the Birds: From Exploitation to Liberation. Essays on Chickens, Turkeys, and Other Domestic Fowl, Lantern Books, 2019. ISBN 978-1-59056-586-5

Articles/chapters

- "Thinking like a chicken: Farm Animals and the Feminine Connection" in Adams, Carol J. Animals and Women: Feminist Theoretical Explorations. Duke University Press, 1995.
- "Open Rescue: Putting a Face on Liberation," in Nocella, Anthony and Best, Steven. Terrorists or Freedom Fighters: Reflections on the Liberation of Animals. Lantern Books, 2004.
- "From Hunting Grounds to Chicken Rights: My Story in an Eggshell," in Kemmerer, Lisa A. Sister Species: Women, Animals, and Social Justice. University of Illinois Press, 2011.
- "The Social Life of Chickens" in Smith, Julie A. and Mitchell, Robert W. (eds.) Experiencing Animals: Encounters Between Animal and Human Minds. Columbia University Press 2011.
- "Procrustean Solutions to Animal Identity and Welfare Problems" in Critical Theory and Animal Liberation, Rowman & Littlefield, 2011.
- "Birds Used in Food Production," in Linzey, Andrew The Global Guide to Animal Protection. University of Illinois Press, 2013.
- "Foreword: Hidden in Plain Sight" in Michael Lanfield The Interconnectedness of Life: We Are Interconnected. We Are Interconnected Films/CreateSpace Independent Publishing Platform, 2014.
- "Creative Maladjustment: From Civil Rights to Chicken Rights" in Michael Lanfield The Interconnectedness of Life: We Are Interconnected. We Are Interconnected Films/CreateSpace Independent Publishing Platform, 2014.
- "Anthropomorphic Visions of Chickens Bred for Human Consumption" in Critical Animal Studies: Why Animals Matter. Canadian Scholars Press, 2014.
- "The Disengagement of Journalistic Discourse about Nonhuman Animals: An Analysis" in Critical Animal Studies: Towards Trans-species Social Justice. Rowman & Littlefield, 2018.
- "How I Became a 'Poultry' Rights Activist Who Started an Organization Some Said Would Never Fly" in Voices For Animal Liberation. Skyhorse Publishing, 2019.
- "Employing Euphemism to Falsify the Fate of Farmed Animals" in Animal Agriculture is Immoral: An Anthology. Climate Healers, 2020.

== See also ==
- Women and animal advocacy
- List of animal rights advocates
