= Hogwood =

Hogwood may refer to:

- Christopher Hogwood, English conductor, harpsichordist, and musicologist
- Hogwood: A Modern Horror Story, 2020 documentary film
