= Food Empowerment Project =

Veganism and food justice organization

- Food Empowerment Project logo
- Abbreviation: F.E.P.
- Formation: 2006
- Legal status: Non-profit
- Purpose: Food justice, veganism, animal rights
- Headquarters: San Luis Obispo, California
- Website: foodispower.org

Food Empowerment Project (F.E.P.) is a non-profit organization focused on veganism and food justice. Its mission statement is "to create a more just and sustainable world by recognizing the power of one's food choices." The organization was founded in 2006 by lauren Ornelas. The organization is based in San Luis Obispo, California.

== Organization and mission ==
The organization is composed of a team of activists from various animal rights, environmental and social justice organizations. They work on encouraging healthy food choices that reflect a more compassionate society by spotlighting the abuse of animals on farms, the depletion of natural resources, unfair working conditions for produce workers, and the lack of access to healthy foods in low-income areas. In January 2011, the organization began researching companies that make vegan products containing chocolate to find out if they source their cocoa beans from countries where child labor and slavery can still be found. The frequently updated list of companies is available on the F.E.P. web site.

In 2024, Food Empowerment Project (F.E.P.) transitioned to a collective operational model.

== Reports ==
In April 2008, the Food Empowerment Project supported California Senate Bill 1443 which would require that a written contract between a retail food facility and a purchaser include an option that allows the purchaser to direct the facility to donate leftover food to a non-profit food bank or provide it to the purchaser.

In March 2009 the F.E.P. began surveying supermarkets, convenience stores and other retail businesses that sell food in Santa Clara County. The resulting 2010 report, "Shining a Light on the Valley of Heart's Delight", found that higher-income areas had more than twice as many large supermarkets per capita than lower-income areas, while lower-income communities have nearly twice as many liquor stores and 50 percent more markets that sell an abundance of meat products. Neither of these latter store types offers a variety of healthy food options, like fresh fruits and vegetables.

== Campaigns ==
F.E.P.'s first corporate campaign targeted Clif Bar, maker of energy bars and drinks, for not disclosing the source of their chocolate. This worried F.E.P. because two West African countries, Ghana and the Ivory Coast, which supply 75 percent of the world's cocoa market were documented by a handful of organizations and journalists to employ child labor and in some cases, slavery on cocoa farms. On December 2, 2014, F.E.P. declared victory with Clif Bar & Company publicly disclosing that its cocoa sources included both suspect countries.

F.E.P. holds an annual school supply drive for the children of farm workers.

Beginning in January 2022, F.E.P. launched a boycott against Amy's Kitchen, maker of organic convenience and frozen foods, after workers reported widespread injuries, low wages, and unreliable healthcare. Workers also cited unreasonable and unsafe workplace conditions, including defective equipment, blocked fire exits, workloads that led to repetitive-stress injuries, a lack of bathroom breaks and access to clean water, and being expected to roll 10 to 12 burritos per minute, while an understaffed line was expected to assemble as many as 72 plates of food per minute. The boycott, which was called for by the workers and was also supported by the group Veggie Mijas, ended on June 12, 2024, after eight months of discussions with Amy's executives. Gains made by workers include increased wages, increased workplace safety measures, a commitment to having bilingual representatives to help workers navigate company benefits, and that the company will not use labor relations consultants, which often force workers into captive audience meetings.

== Accolades ==
F.E.P. received the 2012 Top-Rated Award from GreatNonprofits.

== See also ==
- Human rights
- Silicon Valley Toxics Coalition
