= Silicon Valley Toxics Coalition =

American research and advocacy group

The Silicon Valley Toxics Coalition (SVTC) was formed in San Jose, California as a research and advocacy group that promoted safe environmental practices in the high tech industry. The organization was founded in 1982 following leaks at manufacturing sites at IBM and Fairchild Semiconductor, which contaminated local groundwater used for drinking and were suspected of contributing to widespread birth defects and other health issues in the Silicon Valley. SVTC emerged during a period of growing concern over the environmental contamination and public health effects associated with semiconductor manufacturing industry, despite the high-tech sector was often viewed as environmentally "clean."

SVTC aimed to address the environmental and public health impacts associated with the semiconductor manufacturing and electronic waste, while others subjects include nanotechnology and solar. Its work has focused on issues such as toxic exposure, worker health and the global movement of electronic waste, positioning itself within a broader environmental justice concerns in the Silicon Valley and also internationally.

Since one of its biggest impacts is on e-waste movement, acknowledging the negative impact of sending e-waste containing harmful toxins to US local prisons and to underdeveloped nations, SVTC exposes those who participate in this means of disposal and hold them accountable (see Project & Investigations and Reports sections).

SVTC had ceased operation since 2022 according to its successor organization’s website, Sustainable Systems Research Foundation (SSRF). SVTC’s major initiative Solar Scorecard project was transferred to SSRF and the successor has since built on SVTC’s mission “…committing to environmental sustainability and clean production, improved health and democratic decision-making for communities and workers most affected by the high-tech revolution”.

== E-waste and Global Impact ==
The rapid growth of electronic consumption worldwide, such as television set, computers, mobile devices and household appliances is valued at $1 trillion each year in the electronic market. This increase in demand, which often combined with shorter product life cycles with frequent upgrades and replacement, has led to growing concerns about electronic waste. In year 2022 alone, there was an estimate of 62 million tones of e-waste produced around the world.

Research has shown that large quantities of this e-waste are transported from industrialized nations, namely the US and the European countries (Global North) to developing regions such as China, Africa, India and other Asian countries (Global South), where environmental regulations and worker protections may be limited. This e-waste often contains hazardous substances such as heavy metals and toxic compounds namely lead, mercury, cadmium and others, release into the air and wastewaters during recycling and disposal processes. This could potentially cause health hazards and environmental pollution for communities in those countries that manages the e-waste and toxic substances. Some regions adopt informal recycling methods that include open burning of wires, acid baths to extract metals and manual dismantling without protection are common. These high-risk practices especially common among millions of women workers and child labor in those poor populations.

Apart from limited recycling facilities and regulations in less developed countries, industrialized countries, particularly the United States, have been criticized for lacking strong federal regulations over e-waste exports and has not fully adopted the stricter international agreement such as the Basel Convention, on shipment of hazardous wastes. Electronics consumer goods are defined as "special waste" under US regulation and shipped as recyclable overseas to be managed.

As some research (among many others) and the claim of the dominant narrative of industrialized countries "dumping" e-waste to less developed regions of the world by SVTC, among other non-profits, this has reflected a form of environmental injustice where the cost of disposal shifted to local populations in those poorer countries. This narrative, though it's not inaccurate in itself, its message often implied or framed as exploitative in nature.

Despite the limitation on e-waste regulation in Global North/South and its overall health risks, global flow of e-waste trade exists between countries. However, some studies suggest that global e-waste circulation is complex and uneven, to consider that the "dumping" narrative as oversimplistic, as there are other factors to consider. Some studies suggest that many imported electronics are functional or repairable rather than waste. For example, 91% import waste to Nigeria are functional or repairable, while in Ghana, this is about 85% used, not waste. Secondly, the same study also shows e-waste trade is not one-directional as it also shows Global South-North flows exist. Additionally, in the heart of the e-waste issue is also show how reuse and repair of electronics become central and drivers for demand in affordable electronics, especially in the poor region of the world. In many cases, the e-waste recycle and repair sector is a growing sector in some part of the world, where it provides livelihoods to marginalized people and communities, growing alongside those harm and health risks.

In response to these issues, the SVTC has focused on promoting safer and more sustainable approaches, both locally and worldwide on electronics production and disposal. As a policy-focused and coalition-based organization, SVTC has been involved in promoting the Extended Producer Responsibility (EPR) as state policy within the United States, in which producers are made responsible for electronic disposal and recycling of their products instead of shifting cost to consumers or taxpayers. With EPR, also known as Producer Takeback in place as legislature, ensures electronic producers recycle and manage their e-waste responsibly and reduce e-waste export to other countries where child labors exploitation are common.

Since its inception in 1990 in Sweden, EPR has since slowly expanded to packaging and other product categories such as textiles, pharmaceuticals, paint and many others. EPR also adopted worldwide in countries such as China, EU, India and Mexico.

Additionally, SVTC also established the International Campaign for Responsible Technology (ICRT), an "international solidarity networks" which include activists and organizations around the world to "...promote corporate and government accountability in the global electronics industry." ICRT originated in the Silicon Valley, has a group of diverse supportive networks worldwide in countries such as Hong Kong, USA, Philippines, China, Indonesia, UK, Taiwan and Vietnam addressing different issues concerning labor rights, workers health and safety, environment and economy at the grassroots levels.

SVTC also in partnership with organizations such as Chintan (India), and IMAK (India) on Citizens at Risk: How Electronic Waste is Poisoning the Path Out of Poverty for India's Recyclers, a 13-minute documentary examining the environmental and health impact of e-waste practices in India. The film premiered at the SVTC's 2008 benefit.

== Projects and investigations ==
- Nano Technology: On April 2, 2008, the Silicon Valley Toxics Coalition released a report on the nanotechnology's negative impact on community and environmental health.
- Digital TV Switchover: June 12, 2009, is the deadline for the television industry to switch from broadcasting in analog format to digital. It is anticipated that this change will create an enormous wave of e-waste of up to 80 million televisions becoming obsolete and discarded.
- India E-waste: To help address the global problem of electronic waste SVTC is teaming up with Chintan Environmental Research and Action Group on a research project to document the impact of e-waste on workers and communities in and around Delhi, India.
- Solar Recycling Database: SVTC is developing a Solar Recycling Database by bringing together users, researchers, and companies. According to the SVTC, there are three main goals with the use of the Solar Recycling Database. The first one addresses the disposal, waste management, and recycling of a product when one is done with its use. The second goal is to publicize the development of solar photovoltaic technologies as it is responsible for our high-quality energy. And lastly, the third goal is to expand and create new economic opportunities to properly reuse, recover, or recycle of photovoltaic items. Overall, the Solar Recycling Database informs the public of sustainable ways to get rid of an electronic material without hurting the environment as well as better approaches to solar waste prevention.

== Reports ==
SVTC had produced reports over the years during its establishment, addressing a range of environmental and labor issues in the electronics industry, some of the reports include:

- Electronic Waste: "Poison PCs and Toxic TVs" (2001) details the growing amounts of e-waste, especially PC and televisions piling up in the U.S, specifically in California. The report main purpose is to raise awareness on the growing concern on e-waste surrounding these electronics and to educate the public and policymakers on e-waste management, chemical toxics exposure and the growing financial impacts on local taxpayers. Additionally, the report discusses a market-based policy approach where reducing waste and minimizing taxpayers burden while shifting cost to producers.
  - Another similar report Exporting Harm: The High-tech Trashing of Asia (2002), accompanied by a video with the same title is produced by an international collaboration between Toxics Link India, SCOPE (Pakistan), Greenpeace China, Basel Action Network (BAN) and SVTC. This investigative report documented how e-waste from rich economies is exported to parts of Asia such as China and India, where it is often processed under informal and unsafe conditions, leading to environmental pollution and health risks for workers and local communities in those countries.
- Labor conditions and prison labor: Toxic Sweatshops (2006), a report exposing the abuse of prison labors in the e-waste recycling industry. For the first time, prison inmates and staff blow the whistle on deplorable health and safety conditions within UNICOR, a controversial government corporation operated under the Department of Justice that uses captive prison labor in e-waste recycling industry. These unsafe working environment and health risks also extend to staff including prison guards. Academic research has also highlighted how such labor systems may expose incarcerated workers, prison staff and surrounding environments to toxic materials, raising broader concerns about environmental justice and labor exploitation.
- Nanotechnology: A press release on the issued report titled "Regulating Emerging Technologies in Silicon Valley and Beyond: Lessons Learned from 1981 Chemical Spills in the Electronics Industry and Implications for Regulating Nanotechnology" (2008) examined the environmental and health risks associated with the rapid expansion of nanotechnology, highlighting concerns about limited regulation and insufficient understanding of its impact. (online report no longer exist). The report acknowledges the rise of nanotechnology and how it mirrors the Silicon Valley semiconductor boom of the early 1980s. According to the press release, SVTC urged for further studies, legal structure, and safety linked to nanotechnology and be included in policies in both state and federal level.
- Solar energy: A white paper titled "Toward a Just and Sustainable Solar Energy Industry" (2009) was released, examining the environmental and social concerns related to solar energy industry. The document discussed issues such as solar panel manufacturing, toxic materials used in production, end-of-life disposal, recycling, workers health and safety, creating more "green jobs", as well as policy and regulatory concerns surrounding global supply chains. This document became the influence on sustainability and renewable energy development. One of SVTC's major initiative, Solar Scorecard, which is now transferred to Sustainable Systems Research Foundation (SSRF) is a ranking evaluation on solar manufacturing industry and global supply chain to ensure sustainable production and safety among communities, workers and the environment.

== See also ==
- Cancer Alley (in Louisiana)
- Computers and the environment
- Green computing
- Lauren Ornelas
- Massachusetts Toxics Use Reduction Institute
- Sustainable Electronics Initiative (SEI)
- Sustainable Silicon Valley (SSV)
- Silicon Wadi
