= Animal Outlook =

U.S. non-profit organization

- Founded: 1995; 31 years ago
- Founder: Paul Shapiro
- Type: Nonprofit
- Legal status: 501(c)(3)
- Purpose: Cruelty to animals in agriculture
- Location: Washington, D.C., United States
- Key people: Cheryl Leahy, Erica Meier
- Website: animaloutlook.org
- Formerly called: Compassion Over Killing (COK)

Animal Outlook, formerly known as Compassion Over Killing (COK), is a nonprofit animal advocacy organization based in Washington, D.C. It is headed since May 2021 by Executive Director Cheryl Leahy, who succeeded Erica Meier. Formed in 1995, as a high school club, their primary campaigns are to advocate against factory farming and promote vegan eating. While the group welcomes those who are interested in animal welfare who eat meat, it encourages a transition to a plant-based diet.

== Activities and campaigns ==
- Animal Outlook launched a campaign for Dunkin' Donuts to stock soy milk in its shops, which the company did in certain regions. At the 2009 Taking Action for Animals conference hosted by the Humane Society of the United States, Erica Meier introduced Animal Outlook's follow-up campaign to urge Dunkin' Donuts to remove animal products from its donuts.

== Undercover investigations ==
=== Egg farms ===
The group conducted an investigation into the living conditions at Maryland henhouses, documenting corpses found in group cages and rescuing some of the hens found in the worst conditions. One of the farms documented, owned by ISE America, housed more than 800,000 hens. Following a tip about substandard conditions at the farm, Animal Outlook requested permission to visit the farm before proceeding with an undercover investigation.

The spokesperson for the owner of the farm in question said that the conditions found at the farm were "normal industry practices". While one of the farms asserted that the video footage was not taken at its farm, Animal Outlook had filmed its GPS location as well as mail addressed to the farm in question.

In early 2006, an Animal Outlook investigation inside a Pennsylvania egg farm led to criminal charges of 35 counts of animal cruelty against the owner and manager of the farm, the first case of its kind. Although, charges were pressed by a local animal control officer after viewing a video provided by Animal Outlook, the owner and manager of the farm were eventually acquitted in 2007.

=== Central Valley Meat ===
Animal Outlook's undercover video exposing animal abuse at Central Valley Meat Co. (CVM) prompted the USDA to shut down the California slaughterhouse in 2012 and suspend federal purchases from the facility, a major supplier to the USDA's National School Lunch Program. California-based fast food chain, In-N-Out Burger immediately severed ties with its former supplier CVM upon the release of Animal Outlook's investigation findings, followed by national chains McDonald's and Costco. In February 2014, the facility was again shut down by the USDA for unsanitary conditions.

=== Quanah Cattle Company ===
In 2013, an Animal Outlook activist was arrested (although charges were eventually dropped) in Colorado for filming alleged cattle abuse at the Quanah Cattle Company and failing to report the abuse "in a timely manner". Animal Outlook Executive Director Erica Meier stated that this is a "shoot-the-messenger strategy aimed at detracting attention away from the crimes of those who actually abused animals."

=== Pilgrim's Pride chicken factory farm ===
In 2014, an Animal Outlook investigation exposed chickens being buried alive at a North Carolina factory farm supplying Pilgrim's Corp. (formerly Pilgrim's Pride), the second largest chicken producer in the world and a supplier for Chick-Fil-A, Burger King, Wendy's and Walmart. CNN broke the story.

=== Foster Farms turkey hatchery ===
In early 2015, an Animal Outlook investigator documented the treatment of baby birds which included mutilations, gassing and being ground up alive - inside a Foster Farms hatchery in Fresno, California.

=== Mountaire Farms ===
At a North Carolina chicken slaughterhouse owned by Mountaire Farms, Inc., the seventh largest chicken producer in the U.S., Animal Outlook exposed birds being violently thrown and punched, their feathers being ripped out, and sick or injured birds left in piles to die slowly.

=== Quality Pork Processors (Hormel) ===
In 2015, an Animal Outlook investigator uncovered conditions in a Minnesota facility that kills and processes animals for Hormel. This plant is one of the largest pig slaughterhouses in the U.S., and one of five plants enrolled in Hazard Analysis and Critical Control Point (HACCP) Based Inspection Models Project (HIMP), a pilot USDA program that allows for faster processing of animals with reduced government inspection.

The Washington Post broke the story of the investigation, writing, "Months worth of footage have raised serious concerns about the conditions at one of the largest pork processors in the U.S., and started a government investigation."

In 2013, an Audit Report issued by the USDA's Office of Inspector General (OIG) underscored concerns that HIMP may pose food safety risks.

== Litigation ==
Animal Outlook's innovative Legal Advocacy Program has been working since 2004 to use the legal system to oppose the system injustices of factory farming. Using existing criminal law and civil litigation, the Program focuses on fighting large-scale animal cruelty on factory farms and works to protect consumers from manipulation and unfair practices by the animal agriculture industry.

The Legal Advocacy Program seeks enforcement of existing criminal laws against owners and employees of the facilities for the harming of animals, and develops legal analysis in order to bring landmark lawsuits and other legal actions. The Program also conducts outreach and education, providing attorneys, legal students, and the public with information about farmed animals and the law.

- In 2005, egg producers dropped an "Animal Care Certified" label from their products after Animal Outlook filed a complaint with the Federal Trade Commission for false advertising on the part of the egg companies. Animal Outlook said that the egg label implied that the care of the animals had met a certain standard of animal conditions, which the egg producers had not; the National Advertising Review Board agreed that the label was deceptive. The FTC complaint was dropped when the egg industry agreed to exchange the label in favor of one stating, "United Egg Producers Certified".
- In 2011, dairy consumers, including members of Animal Outlook, filed a class action lawsuit on behalf of consumers alleging that several dairy companies and trade groups—including Land O'Lakes, the National Milk Producers Federation, and Dairy Farmers of America—joined as Cooperatives Working Together (CWT) in order to engage in a price fixing scheme that inflated the price of milk. This resulted, according to the complaint, in over $9.5 billion in illegally obtained profits and could impact the price of milk for years.
- Animal Outlook joined organizations Animal Legal Defense Fund, Farm Sanctuary and Animal Protection and Rescue League, and individuals, in filing a lawsuit against the USDA for allowing the sale of foie gras, a diseased poultry product. The agency is required through the Poultry Products Inspection Act to condemn diseased poultry as adulterated. The force-feeding of ducks and geese to produce foie gras results in a condition known as hepatic lipidosis or "fatty liver disease", in which the birds' livers swell up to ten times their normal size.

== See also ==
- List of animal rights groups
