= Christine Stevens (animal welfare activist) =

American animal welfare campaigner

Christine Gesell Stevens
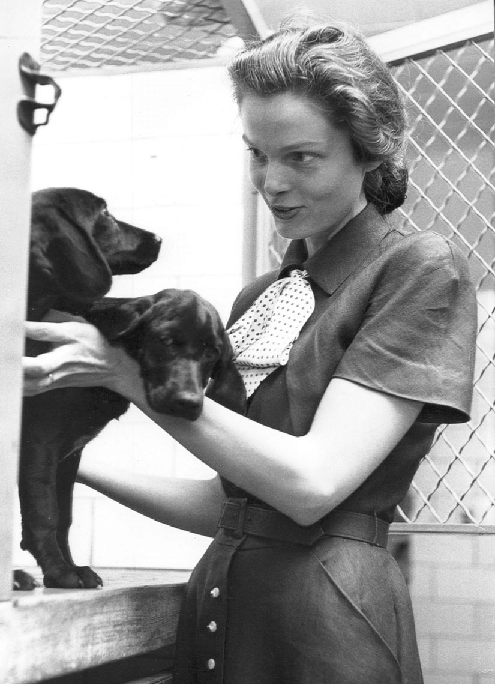
- Born: March 10, 1918; St. Louis, Missouri
- Died: October 11, 2002 (aged 84); Georgetown
- Occupation: Animal welfare activist

Christine Gesell Stevens (March 10, 1918 – October 11, 2002) was an American animal welfare activist and conservationist.

== Biography ==
Stevens was born in St. Louis, Missouri. She studied at the University of Michigan College of Literature, Science, and the Arts (1936-1938) and at the Society of Arts and Crafts in Detroit (1938-1942). She married Roger L. Stevens in 1938. They had a daughter, Christabel.

Stevens founded the Animal Welfare Institute (AWI) in 1951 and the Society for Animal Protective Legislation (SAPL) in 1955. Under Stevens's leadership the SAPL succeeded in helping to pass animal protection laws including the Animal Welfare Act, Humane Slaughter Act, Endangered Species Act and the Marine Mammal Protection Act.

Stevens was the president of AWI until her death in 2002. She is considered the mother of the Animal Welfare Act and the Endangered Species Act. She took no salary for her AWI work. Stevens was an honorary trustee of the Bat Conservation International and the New York State Humane Association.

She died at Georgetown University Hospital. The Christine Stevens Wildlife Awards was named in her honour.

== Interviews ==
Interviews with Stevens are archived in the Animal Rights Network Oral History Collection at the Special Collections Research Center in NC State University Libraries.

== See also ==
- Women and animal advocacy
