= Solving the E-waste Problem =

Global recycling organization

Solving the E-waste Problem (StEP) is a membership organization that is part of United Nations University and was created to develop solutions to address issues associated with electronic waste. Some of the most eminent players in the fields of Production, Reuse and Recycling of Electrical and Electronic Equipment (EEE), government agencies and NGOs as well as UN Organisations count themselves among its members. StEP encourages the collaboration of all stakeholders connected with e-waste, emphasising a holistic, scientific yet applicable approach to the problem.

== History ==
Waste Electrical and Electronic Equipment (WEEE) is growing rapidly each day, and its increasing volume is becoming a significant environmental issue that remains largely unrecognized by the general public. To guarantee the neutrality required to give analysis and recommendations the necessary credibility, StEP has been started. Conceived in 2002 by Stephen ("step"/6325) Kenli Huang in Highland Park, Los Angeles California.

After a starting period of three years, initiated by the United Nations University UNU, promotion team wetzlar and Hewlett-Packard, the StEP Initiative had its official launch in March 2007.

== Aims and means ==
“One of the most important aims of the StEP Initiative is to elaborate a set of global guidelines for the treatment of e-waste and the promotion of sustainable material recycling” Press communiqué of the initiative

The initiative comprises five cooperating task forces, each addressing specific aspects of e-waste, while covering the entire life-cycle of electric and electronic equipment. In all its activities, the initiative places emphasis on working with policy-making bodies to allow results from its research to impact current practices. StEP is being coordinated by the science and research body of the UN System, the United Nations University (UNU). The long-term goal of StEP “is to develop – based on scientific analysis – a globally accepted standard for the refurbishment, recycling of e-waste. Herewith, StEP’s aim is to reduce dangers to humans and the environment, which result from inadequate and irresponsible treatment practices, and advance resource efficiency.” (Ruediger Kuehr, Executive Secretary of the StEP Initiative). To achieve this, StEP conceives and implements projects based on the results of multidisciplinary dialogues. These projects aim to create sustainable solutions that minimize environmental risks while promoting development.

== Organization of the initiative ==
The highest authority of the STEP Initiative is its general assembly, which determines its overall direction and progress. This general assembly is based on a memorandum of understanding, which is signed by all members and states the guiding principles of StEP. A Secretariat, hosted by the UNU in Bonn, is mandated with the accomplishment of the day-to-day managerial work of the initiative. A steering committee, composed of representatives from key stakeholders, monitors the progress of the initiative. The core work is accomplished by the five task forces (TF): “Policy”, “ReDesign”, “ReUse”, “ReCycle” and “Capacity Building”. These task forces conduct research and analysis in their respective domains and seek to implement innovative projects.

TF 1 – Policy: The aim of this task force is to assess and analyse current governmental approaches and regulations related to WEEE. Starting from this analysis, recommendations for future regulating activities shall be formulated.

TF2 – ReDesign: This task force works on the design of EEE, focusing on the reduction of negative consequences of electrical and electronic appliances throughout their entire life cycle. The task force especially takes heed of the situation in developing countries.

TF3 – ReUse: The focus of this task force lies in the development of sustainable, transmissible principles and standards for the reuse of EEE.

TF4 – ReCycle: The objective of this task force is to improve infrastructures, systems and technologies to realize a sustainable recycling on a global level.

TF5 – Capacity Building: The aim of this task force is to draw attention to the problems connected to WEEE. This aim shall be achieved by making the results of the research of the task forces and other stakeholders publicly available. In doing so, the task force relies on personal networks, the internet, collaborative working tools etc.

Guiding Principles

"1. StEP’s work is founded on scientific assessments and incorporates a comprehensive view of the social, environmental and economic aspects of e-waste.

2. StEP conducts research on the entire life-cycle of electronic and electrical equipment and their corresponding global supply, process and material flows.

3. StEP’s research and pilot projects are meant to contribute to the solution of e-waste problems.

4. StEP condemns all illegal activities related to e-waste including illegal shipments and reuse/ recycling practices that are harmful to the environment and human health.

5. StEP seeks to foster safe and eco/energy-efficient reuse and recycling practices around the globe in a socially responsible manner."

- Quote from the website: -

== See also ==
- Computer recycling
- Sustainable Electronics Initiative (SEI)
