= Tony Wardle =

British journalist and writer

Tony Wardle is a British journalist and writer. He co-authored, with Michael Mansfield, the 1993 book Presumed Guilty: British Legal System Exposed, which criticised the British criminal justice system. He is a vegan and actively involved in the work of Viva!, an animal rights organisation of which he is an associate director. He is also editor of the magazine Viva!Life. He was also a founding director of The Vegetarian and Vegan Foundation until its closure in 2013, along with Juliet Gellatley. He and filmmaker Yvette Vanson created Vanson Wardle Productions Ltd in 1981.

He was a contestant on Come Dine with Me in 2008.

== Works ==
- Know France by Tony Wardle (hardcover - March 1975)
- The Battle for Orgreave [UK documentary film, 52 minutes, 1985] directed by Yvette Vanson, produced by Vanson Wardle Productions Ltd
- The Battle for Orgreave [paperback] by Bernard Jackson and Tony Wardle, published by Vanson Wardle Productions Ltd (June 1986)
- Presumed Guilty: British Legal System Exposed by Michael Mansfield and Tony Wardle (paperback - 11 April 1994)
- Devour the Earth (1995) film documentary written by Tony Wardle and narrated by Paul McCartney, distributed by the European Vegetarian Union.
- The Silent Ark: A Chilling Expose of Meat - The Global Killer by Juliet Gellatley and Tony Wardle (paperback - Thorsons - 1996)
- The Livewire Guide to Going, Being and Staying Veggie by Juliet Gellatley and Tony Wardle (paperback, The Women's Press, 1998)
- Born to be Wild: Human's global impact on animals. by Juliet Gellatley and Tony Wardle (paperback, The Women's Press, 1999).
- Justice Denied by Tony Wardle (pamphlet - 31 March 2009)
- Hogwood: A Modern Horror Story (director, 2020)
