= Sustainable Silicon Valley =

Sustainable Silicon Valley (SSV) is a collaboration of businesses, governments, and non-governmental organizations that are identifying and addressing environmental and resource pressures in Silicon Valley. As its first initiative, SSV engaged Valley organizations, who are the SSV Partners, to work towards a goal of reducing regional carbon dioxide (CO_{2}) emissions 20% below 1990 levels by 2010. The SSV approach to reaching this goal is to facilitate strategies to reduce CO_{2} emissions through increased energy and fuel efficiency and through the use of renewable sources of energy.

== History ==
Sustainable Silicon Valley is a multi-stakeholder collaborative initiative to produce significant environmental improvement and resource conservation in Silicon Valley through the development and implementation of a regional environmental management system (EMS). SSV began in 2001 as a collaboration among business, led by the Silicon Valley Leadership Group (SVLG); government, led by California Environmental Protection Agency and political leaders; and non-governmental organizations, led by the Silicon Valley Environmental Partnership (SVEP).

Representatives from these organizations formed a team to develop a project plan and introduce it to a wider group of participants. Participants were invited from the entire Silicon Valley region, including Santa Clara and San Mateo, Northern Santa Cruz, and Southern Alameda counties.

SSV's first focus is on reducing CO_{2} emissions. This compares to the Kyoto Protocol's goal of a 5% reduction over the same period, and to Governor Schwarzenegger's call for California to reduce emissions to 2000 levels by 2010, to 1990 levels by 2020, and to 80% below 1990 levels by 2050. SSV's 20% reduction target was announced publicly in April 2003, and a first group of organizations and companies (SSV Partners) officially pledged to join SSV in March 2004 to work toward reaching this ambitious goal. Each pledging partner also chooses how to meet this target, whether by equipment efficiency improvements (e.g. new equipment), conserving energy (e.g. behavioral changes), increasing the use of renewable energy sources (e.g. photovoltaic systems), purchasing green power and/or promoting alternative commute options and supporting the purchase of low emission vehicles.

== SSV programs ==
WEST Summit (Water, Energy and Smart Technology): SSV's annual conference.

EcoCouncil: Sustainable Silicon Valley established an EcoCouncil for the senior level management of Sustaining Partners to support these endeavors.

Sustainability Leaders Forum (SLF): Building the capacity and effectiveness of sustainability leaders by sharing best practices and presenting expert knowledge about sustainability. Forum meetings feature peer-to-peer learning, expert instruction and opportunities to network and explore issues of common concern.

EcoCloud: Launched December 2010, EcoCloud is a virtual meeting place where one can work with local businesses, industry experts, academia and policy-makers.

Smart Micro Grid for Santa Clara University : SSV helped Santa Clara University and its utility service providers launch a campus-wide smart microgrid, as the university works towards its goal of becoming carbon neutral by 2016, provides the basis for knowledge transfer among SSV partners as they also move to create their own smart microgrids – integrating smart buildings, renewable energy, storage and communications.

== See also ==
- Sustainable Electronics Initiative (SEI)
- Silicon Wadi
