= Juliet Gellatley =

British writer and animal rights activist

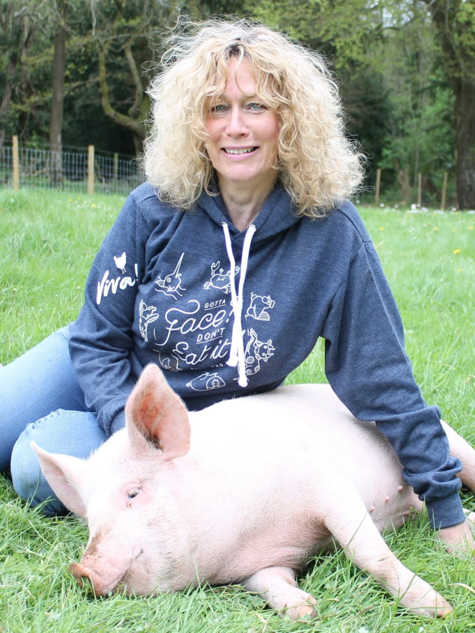
- Gellatley in 2022
- Occupation: Writer • animal rights activist
- Years active: 1987–present
- Organizations: Vegetarian Society (1987–1993); Viva! (1994–present)
- Movement: Animal rights

Juliet Gellatley is a British writer and animal rights activist. She is the founder and director of Viva! and a former director of the Vegetarian Society. She is also a founding director of The Vegetarian and Vegan Foundation, now known as Viva! Health, along with Tony Wardle, with whom she was married and has two sons, Jazz and Finn, born in 2002.

She is the author of The Livewire Guide to Going, Being and Staying Veggie!, The Silent Ark: A Chilling Expose of Meat – The Global Killer, and Born To Be Wild: The Livewire Guide to Saving Animals.

Gellatley was the winner of the Linda McCartney Award for Animal Welfare in 1999, sponsored by the Daily Mirror's Pride of Britain Awards.

== Career ==
Gellatley became vegetarian at the age of 15 and has spent most of her working life campaigning on behalf of animal rights. After obtaining a degree in zoology and psychology, she became the Vegetarian Society's first youth education officer (1987 to 1993) and rose to become its director.

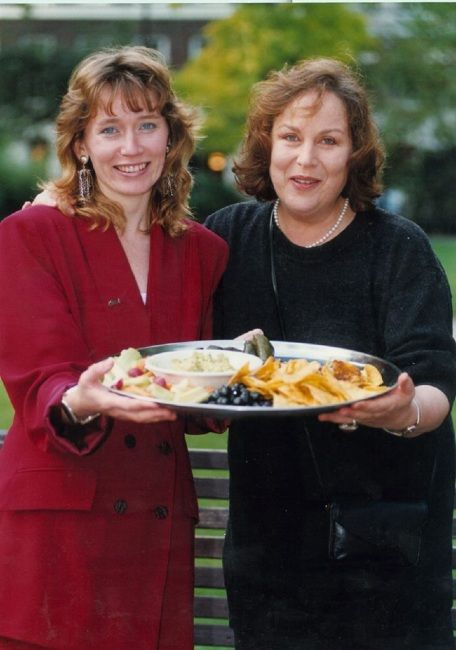
Gellatley and Pam Ferris at the launch of Viva! in 1994

She launched Greenscene, Britain's only magazine for young vegetarians, and was its editor from 1987 to 1992. In October 1994, she launched Viva!, a registered charity that campaigns for vegetarian and vegan lifestyles and promotes animal rights. She was the editor and one of the authors of Vegetarian Issues: A Resource Pack for Secondary Schools, 1992.

In 1997, Gellatley created a website to campaign against the culling of kangaroos and the trade in their meat. The Australian High Commission in London responded that it was "a campaign based on false, emotive and outdated information" and that the meat was a by-product of a regulated cull to control the numbers of kangaroos that would take place anyway.

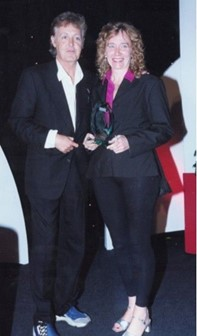
Gellatley and Paul McCartney in 1999

Gellatley was the winner of the Linda McCartney Award for Animal Welfare in 1999, sponsored by the Daily Mirror's Pride of Britain Awards.

In 2002, Gellatley co-authored When Pigs Cry: A Report on the USA Pig Industry.

In 2002, on the television show 60 Minutes, she talked about the "illegal" killing of kangaroos in Australia, and in 2006 wrote "'Under Fire' A Viva! Report on the Killing of Kangaroos for Meat and Skin". She subsequently took the campaign to Australia itself.

Gellatley was one of several people who provided information used in the writing of the book Striking at the Roots: A Practical Guide to Animal Activism (2008) by Mark Hawthorne.

Gellatley extended the campaign to the football industry, launching the "Killing for Kicks" campaign. She has named Adidas as a company that uses kangaroo skin to make football boots.

As of June 2018, kangaroo meat has been removed from all UK supermarkets. The same year, pet supplies retailer Pets at Home agreed to discontinue the sale of dog treats that contained kangaroo meat.

== See also ==
- Women and animal advocacy
- Women and vegetarianism and veganism advocacy
- List of animal rights advocates
