= Anna Briggs =

American animal rights activist

- Born: Anna Catherine Reynolds; 9 December 1909; Washington, D.C.
- Died: 15 February 2011 (aged 101); Berryville, Virginia
- Occupation: Activist
- Spouse: James Phillip Briggs (m. 1927)

Anna Catherine Briggs (9 December 1909 – 15 February 2011) was an American activist for animal rights and welfare. She was the founder of the National Humane Education Society.

== Career ==
Briggs founded the National Humane Education Society (NHES) in 1948. The goal of the organization was to promote kindness to animals and children. The organization was able to neuter over 2000 cats and dogs each year and rehome them. At aged 95, Briggs still worked for the NHES five days a week. She was president of the NHES.

In 1950, Briggs established the Peace Plantation Animal Sanctuary on a 150-acre farm in Sterling, Virginia. It relocated to Walton, New York in 1984. Briggs also founded the Briggs Animal Adoption Center in Charles Town, West Virginia which is managed by the NHES.

In the early 1960s, she rescued 50 animals from the construction site of Dulles International Airport. In the 1980s, she collaborated with the American Society for the Prevention of Cruelty to Animals and was responsible for feeding stray cats at Grand Central Station. Briggs was an opponent of the fur trade commenting that fur garments were ethically wrong as they were obtained at the cost of animal suffering and that clothing made from synthetic material is just as protective and less expensive than furs.

She was awarded the Animal Humanitarian of the Year Award for the United States by the Animal Protection Institute.

== Personal life ==
Briggs was the daughter of Robert and Mary Hahn Reynolds. She married James Phillip Briggs in 1927. He was the founder of the Be Kind to Animals Rest Farm in Potomac, Maryland and inspired her to become a vegetarian. He was president of the Washington Vegetarian Society. He died in 1945.

Briggs was a vegetarian for over 80 years. She was the oldest vegetarian featured in the book Vegetarians and Vegans in America Today, published in 2006. She died aged 101, on 15 February 2011 at Golden Living Rose Hill Nursing Home in Berryville, Virginia.

== Selected publications ==
- For the Love of Animals: The Story of the National Humane Education Society. Potomac Publishing. 1990.
- Because We Love Them: A Handbook for Animal Lovers. National Humane Education Society. 1994.
- Paws for Thought: How Animals Enrich Our Lives and How We Can Better Care for Them. National Humane Education Society. 1997.
- Legacy of love: Teaching Future Generations to Care About Animals. National Humane Education Society. 1998.

== Quotes ==
I believe we have a responsibility to those creatures to give them a decent life: food, water, a home and respect for their lives. That's not a lot, but for millions of animals in the United States alone it means the difference between life and death.

— Anna Briggs, in 1999
