= Striking at the Roots =

2007 book by Mark Hawthorne

Striking at the Roots: A Practical Guide to Animal Activism
- Author: Mark Hawthorne
- Language: English
- Subject: Animal activism
- Publisher: O Books
- Publication date: 2007
- Pages: 282 / 416
- ISBN: 978-1846940910 re-issue: ISBN 978-1785358821
- Followed by: Bleating Hearts: The Hidden World of Animal Suffering
- Website: strikingattheroots.wordpress.com

Striking at the Roots: A Practical Guide to Animal Activism is a non-fiction book by Mark Hawthorne that examines a number of strategies for animal activism in countries such as Australia, Canada, New Zealand, South Africa, the United Kingdom, and the United States. The book was published by O Books in the UK in 2007 as a 282-page paperback. An expanded, 10th-anniversary edition was released as a 416-page paperback in November 2018.

== Background ==
More than 100 animal activists—including Carol J. Adams, Gene Baur, Alka Chandna, Karen Davis, Joyce D'Silva, Adam Durand, Juliet Gellatley, Bruce Friedrich, pattrice jones, Erik Marcus, Jack Norris, Glenys Oogjes, Lauren Ornelas, Colleen Patrick-Goudreau, Nathan Runkle, and Joyce Tischler—discuss the models of activism that work best for advancing animal rights and animal welfare.

Contents include discussions of leafleting, writing, tabling, protesting, corporate campaigning, legislation, lobbying, multimedia, direct action, and using vegan food as outreach.

In their review, Publishers Weekly called the book "detailed, straightforward and highly practical, even if your cause isn't animal rights", and added: "Concise guidance, an empowering tone and a large, global community of voices make this book eminently useful for anyone organizing a movement, though Hawthorne's optimism can belie the often difficult path to change."

Hawthorne says he wrote the book because when he first got into animal activism, he could not find a book like it: "one resource that you could easily carry with you" that covers the broad range of activist models. The book is written for people who are already concerned about abuse of animals and need to learn how to take effective action.

The title is derived from Walden, in which Henry David Thoreau writes: "There are a thousand hacking at the branches of evil to one who is striking at the root." Thoreau's phrase "striking at the root" may be an allusion to Matthew 3:10 -- "And now also the axe is laid unto the root of the trees: therefore every tree which bringeth not forth good fruit is hewn down, and cast into the fire."

Hawthorne's second book, Bleating Hearts: The Hidden World of Animal Suffering, was published in 2013.

His third book, A Vegan Ethic: Embracing a Life of Compassion Toward All, was published on July 29, 2016.
