= Castillo v. Case Farms of Ohio =

- Court: United States District Court for the Western District of Texas
- Full case name: Gerardo Castillo, et al. v. Case Farms of Ohio, Inc., et al.
- Decided: December 1, 1999
- Docket nos.: 97-cv-89
- Citation: 96 F. Supp. 2d 578

Holding
- Labor Agency is an agent for farm. Farm is liable for wrongful actions of the labor agency.

Court membership
- Judge sitting: Justice

Keywords
- Agency (law)

Castillo v. Case Farms of Ohio, 96 F. Supp. 2d 578 (W.D. Tex. 1999), is a case involving poor working conditions for migratory workers. It established that a principal / agent relationship existed between Case Farms and America's Tempcorps (ATC) that allowed Case Farms to be liable for its agent's actions.

== Facts ==
Migrant farm workers were recruited in Texas by America's Tempcorps to work in Case Farm's Ohio-based chicken processing plant. They were given a bus ticket and $20 for three days of food. Upon arriving they found themselves living in conditions called "distressing and deplorable" by the court. The employees were packed in to unfurnished rooms infested with cockroaches and rats. The workers slept on the floor and were transported in an overcrowded van.

== Issue ==
The working conditions were largely not refuted. At issue was 1) whether or not American's Tempcorps (ATC) was an agent of Case Farms, and 2) if agency existed, whether that agency make Case Farms liable for ATC's actions.

== Complaint ==
The plaintiffs alleged:

- Violations of the Migrant and Seasonal Agricultural Workers Protection Act (AWPA)
- Violations of the Fair Labor Standards Act
- Breach of Contract
- Fraud
- Negligent Misrepresentation

== Plaintiff’s Argument ==
Castillo argued that agency relationship existed between ATC and Case Farms, and the scope of that relationship included both the express authority to recruit and hire people to work at Case Farms’ plant, and the implied authority to do all things proper, usual and necessary to exercise that authority.

== Defendant’s Argument ==
Case Farms argued, to the extent that an agency relationship existed, the scope of that agency was limited solely to informing recruits about the availability of work at Case Farms’ processing plant. They also contended that the workers recruited by ATC were not full-fledged Case Farms workers (despite the fact that the work, pay rates, and supervision of these workers were essentially identical to Case Farms employees.)

== The Court's Analysis ==
1) A principal may be liable for the acts of a purported agent based on an actual agency relationship created by the principal's express or implied delegation of authority to the agent.

2) A principal is liable only if those actions are taken in the scope of the agent's employment. Express actual authority exists “where the principal has made it clear to the agent that he wants the act under scrutiny to be done.”

3) Giving an agent express authority to undertake a certain act also includes the implied authority to do all things proper, usual, and necessary to exercise that express authority.

The evidence at trial supported the contention that Case Farms expressly authorized ATC to recruit and hire people to work at Case Farms’ Ohio plant, and that such an express agency existed with the scope of recruiting and hiring migrant workers. The evidence also supported the contention that the housing and transportation activities were well within the agents implied authority—based on Case Farms’ unique recruiting challenges, the great distances the migrant workers sought were required to travel, and Case Farms outsourcing of this difficult recruiting task to ATC.

== Holding ==
America's Tempcorps was an agent of Case Farms, ATC's actions were attributable to Case Farms for the purpose of assessing compliance with the AWPA, and Case Farms was liable for ATC's actions.
