= Animal Welfare Institute =

American charitable organization

The AWI logo

The Animal Welfare Institute (AWI) is an American non-profit charitable organization founded by Christine Stevens in 1951 with the goal of reducing suffering inflicted on animals by humans. It is one of the oldest animal welfare organizations in the US. Its legislative division, the Society for Animal Protective Legislation (SAPL), pushes for the passage of laws that reflect this purpose.

== Campaigns and goals ==
In the organization's early years, its particular emphasis was on animals used for experimentation. Animal Welfare Institute (AWI) expanded the scope of its work in the following decades to address many other areas of animal protection related issues.

One major area of emphasis is factory farms. AWI speaks out against this and promotes small, independent family farms that follow the organization's animal welfare and husbandry standards. Other efforts include ending the use of steel-jaw leghold traps for catching fur-bearing animals, improving the lives of animals in laboratories, and promoting the development of non-animal testing methods.

AWI representatives regularly attend meetings of the Convention on International Trade in Endangered Species of Wild Fauna and Flora (CITES) to fight for the protection of threatened and endangered species. They also attend meetings of the International Whaling Commission to fight to preserve the ban on commercial whaling and work to protect all marine life against the proliferation of anthropogenic ocean noise.

Marine biologist and nature writer Rachel Carson joined the Animal Welfare Institute Advisory Board in 1960, just prior to the release of her book Silent Spring.

== Government and legal affairs division ==
In 1951, it was illegal for non-profit tax-exempt organizations to engage in lobbying activities. "We couldn't do any substantial amount of lobbying and keep our tax-exempt status," explained AWI founder Christine Stevens, who is referred to as the "Mother of the Animal Protection Movement." Her solution was to form an organization that did not require a tax-exempt status, one that would inform senators, representatives and the public about animal issues. The Society for Animal Protective Legislation (SAPL) became the first organization founded in the United States specifically to lobby on behalf of animals. If legislators wanted to know more about issues pertaining to humane slaughter, leghold traps or endangered species, they contacted SAPL. Because of changes in tax laws, in 2003, SAPL merged with the Animal Welfare Institute, bringing together two of the oldest and leading animal protection organizations in the United States.

AWI and SAPL have worked for the successful adoption of more than 15 federal laws, including the Animal Welfare Act, the Endangered Species Act, the Humane Slaughter Act and the Marine Mammal Protection Act. AWI continues to defend existing laws, oppose bills that they believe threaten animals, and work for new protective measures, following through after they are enacted to ensure sound regulation and sufficient funds for enforcement. Current efforts include pushing for the passage of bills to ban horse slaughter, end the sale of random source dogs and cats by dealers and prohibit the use of the steel-jaw leghold trap.

Additionally, to highlight Members of Congress' stances on animal welfare legislation, AWI created a website tracking and ranking system called the Compassion Index (CI). Available online at Compassion Index, the frequently updated electronic tally system rates legislators based on their support or lack thereof for certain animal welfare measures.

AWI also engages in litigation on behalf of animals in state and federal courts. The organization won a preliminary injunction to block the Bureau of Land Management from performing sterilization surgeries on wild horses. It also won a case against the US Fish and Wildlife Service, which the court found was violating the Endangered Species Act and the National Environmental Policy Act by failing to protect red wolves.

AWI opposed the Bipartisan Sportsmen's Act of 2014 (S. 2363; 113th Congress), calling it "an attack on our nation's wild animals and habitat." According to the organization, the bill would "eliminate the Environmental Protection Agency's authority under the Toxic Substances Control Act to regulate hazardous substances – including lead, a dangerous neurotoxin – released by ammunition and sport fishing waste."

== Animal Welfare Approved ==
In fall 2006, AWI launched the Animal Welfare Approved (AWA) standards program to evaluate treatment of animals on farms. The program is now administered by A Greener World, which split from the Animal Welfare Institute in 2016. While stricter than many other labels, it has faced some criticism for allowing practices such as chick culling, separating dairy calves from mothers, and the use of fast-growing birds.

== Awards ==
In 1951, Albert Schweitzer gave AWI permission to strike a medal in his honor, to be presented for outstanding achievement in the advancement of animal welfare. In granting his permission, Schweitzer wrote, "I would never have believed that my philosophy, which incorporates in our ethics a compassionate attitude toward all creatures, would be noticed and recognized in my lifetime."

In 1954, a gold replica of the medal was presented to Schweitzer by Charles Joy in Oslo, Norway, where he had gone to accept the Nobel Peace Prize. Since first being awarded in 1954, AWI's Albert Schweitzer Medal has become the highest form of recognition in the animal protection movement. International figures, such as Dr. Jane Goodall, Rachel Carson, Astrid Lindgren and Senator Robert Dole, have received this honor for their work on behalf of animals.

AWI’s Christine Stevens Wildlife Award, established in 2006, provides grants to help develop humane methods of resolving conflicts between wild animals and humans, as well as less intrusive wildlife study techniques.

The Clark R. Bavin Wildlife Law Enforcement Award is presented by AWI at the Conference of the Parties to CITES to recognize people and organizations who fight wildlife crime.

AWI published the children's book The Boy Who Loved All Living Things: The Imaginary Childhood Journal of Albert Schweitzer, written and illustrated by Sheila Hamanaka, and inspired by Schweitzer's youth.

== Publications ==
The Animal Welfare Institute publishes the AWI Quarterly magazine which is distributed to over 46,000 individuals and organizations.

== See also ==
- Animal law
- Animal welfare
- List of animal welfare organizations
