= ISE America =

ISE America is a privately owned company that is the 17th largest producer of chicken eggs in the United States and is wholly owned by the Japanese food conglomerate ISE Foods Co., Ltd., which is that nation's largest egg producer, and the 6th largest egg producer in the world.

== History ==
Founded in 1980, ISE America is based in Galena, Maryland and produces eggs for retail, food service, and further processor markets, whose products include shell, hard cooked, liquid/frozen, and farms eggs, as well as pasteurized eggs. It is, also, entirely integrated, operating its own breeder, hatchery, feed mills, and pullet farms and has other offices in New Jersey and South Carolina.

== Corporate affairs ==
- Doug Wicker: Vice President
- Gregg Clanton: Vice President
- Larry Beck: Chief Information Officer, Chief Technology Officer, Chief Sales Officer
- Denise Ford: Controller

== Cultural initiatives ==
In 1983, ISE America founded the nonprofit organization ISE Cultural Foundation in New York City to promote cross-cultural exchanges (United States–Japan) in the arts, mainly in visual arts, and whom, in 2015, received a Consul General's Commendation from the Consulate General of Japan in New York.
