= United Poultry Concerns =

American animal rights organization

- Formation: 1990; 36 years ago
- Founder: Karen Davis
- Type: 501(c)(3)
- Legal status: Non-profit
- Website: www.upc-online.org

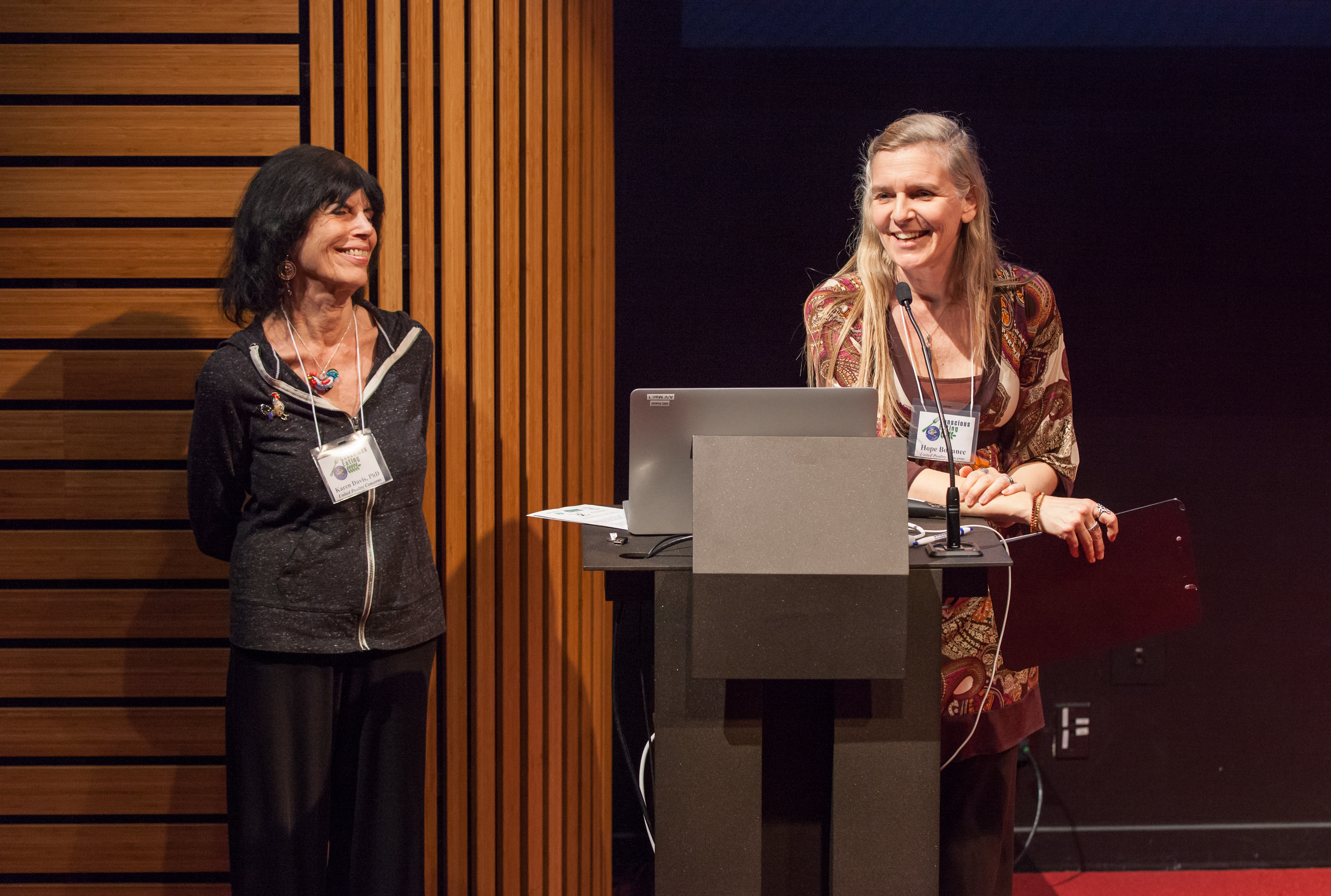
Hope Bohanec introduces UPC president and founder Karen Davis at the 2018 Conscious Eating Conference in Berkeley, California.

United Poultry Concerns is a U.S.-based animal rights advocacy nonprofit addressing the welfare of poultry such as chickens, turkeys, and ducks. Founded in 1990 by animal rights advocate Karen Davis, the organization campaigns against the industrial use of poultry in food production and other industries. Its activities include public education, advocacy campaigns, conferences, and the operation of a chicken sanctuary.

== History ==
United Poultry Concerns was founded in 1990 by American animal rights advocate and writer Karen Davis. Davis, who held a PhD in English and taught at the University of Maryland, College Park, became involved in the animal advocacy during the 1980s and developed a focus on the treatment of chickens and other domestic fowl in agriculture and other human uses.

== See also ==
- List of animal rights groups
- Legal Impact for Chickens
- Veganism
