= Sustainable Electronics Initiative =

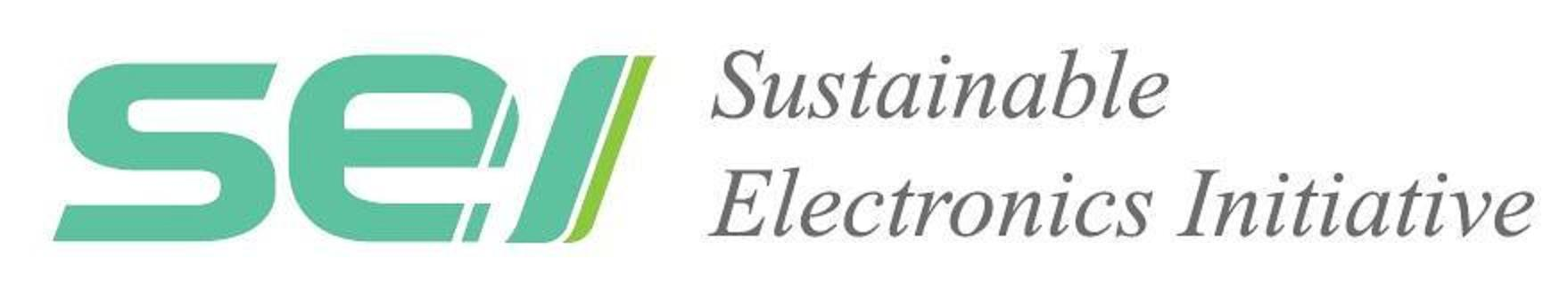
- Abbreviation: SEI
- Formation: 2009
- Purpose: Electronics sustainability
- Location: Champaign, Illinois
- Director: Tim Lindsey
- Affiliated Faculty: William Bullock
- Industry Affiliate: Willie Cade
- Parent organization: Illinois Sustainable Technology Center, Institute of Natural Resource Sustainability
- Affiliations: PC Rebuilders and Recyclers
- Website: http://www.sustainelectronics.illinois.edu/

Sustainable Electronics Initiative (SEI) is an initiative started in the United States in the summer of 2009 by the Illinois Sustainable Technology Center, which is a division of the Institute of Natural Resource Sustainability of the University of Illinois at Urbana-Champaign. SEI is dedicated to developing and implementing sustainable means for the design, manufacturing, remanufacturing, and recycling of electronics (computers, cell phones, televisions, printers, etc.) Members of SEI include individuals from academia, non-profit organizations, government agencies, manufacturers, designers, recyclers and refurbishers.

The goals of the Sustainable Electronics Initiative are to provide research, education, technical assistance, and data management for the general public and other interested parties with regard to electronics and electronic waste. SEI conducts collaborative research with professors and industry representatives, facilitates networking and information exchange among its participants, promotes the diffusion of technology through demonstration projects, and it provides a forum for discussion of applicable policies and legislation.

SEI was created as a response to the growing national and international demand for more sustainable electronic designs and more environmentally friendly ways to handle electronics once they reach the end of their useful lives. Currently, individual states have passed laws regarding ewaste, but federal legislation has not yet been passed. The United States House of Representatives and United States Senate are, however, currently considering federal legislation which will fund electronics research, recycling, and refurbishing.

Bill S.1397 was proposed by Senator Amy Klobuchar (D-MN) and Senator Kirsten Gillibrand (D-NY) in July 2009. The bill addresses the illegal dumping of electronic waste to undeveloped countries. More importantly, however, the bill also focuses on the importance of research and development for the designing and manufacturing of sustainable electronics, which would be recycled, reused, and refurbished more easily. The European Union, on the other hand, has passed several strict laws governing electronic equipment and its disposal.

While one of the SEI goals is to minimize waste, this goal can be reached through the application of life cycle analyses. By analyzing the complete life cycle of a product, SEI will take into consideration the design, processing, manufacturing, use, and disposal stages of electronic equipment. With the use of life cycle analyses, SEI plans to make the overall process of computers and other electronics more sustainable and less environmentally harmful.

== Symposia and workshops ==
In 2009, SEI hosted "Truth, Tragedy, and Transformation of E-Waste," the first free public talk in a lecture series presented by the Institute of Natural Resource Sustainability at the University of Illinois at Urbana-Champaign. Willie Cade, the founder and CEO of PC Rebuilders and Recyclers (PCRR) gave a lecture focusing on the current e-waste problems and how refurbishing can help alleviate the current e-waste problem. Cade also spoke about current assumptions with regard to e-waste and their possible inaccuracies. In addition, free cell phone recycling was offered to attendees of the event, with proceeds going to local nonprofits.

Design for Energy and the Environment was the first annual symposium hosted by SEI, which included presentations from representatives from industry, government agencies, and academia. Topics of the symposium include: education, materials and design, life cycle analysis, policies, design for end-of-life, and electronics recovery. In addition, the symposium will include keynote speakers from the United States Environmental Protection Agency (EPA), Dell, and Walmart. The symposium welcomes designers, manufacturers, chemists, electrical engineers, government representatives, and all others.

== Education and research ==
=== Design for Energy and the Environment Laboratory (DEE Lab) ===
The DEE Lab is a new campus research laboratory bringing together faculty and students from design, marketing, business and engineering to solve real world product development problems for industry. Companies are finding that they can no longer compete on the basis of technology alone. User needs must be met through technology, and successful companies must create innovative products that delight customers. For this reason, the DEE Lab links user-centered/customer focused and technology driven disciplines to work toward common goals and solutions. DEE Lab integrates research and instruction to solve real world problems for industry while preparing students for leadership positions in collaborative product development. DEE Lab’s integral disciplines are industrial design, graphic design, architecture and marketing, given their user centered roles, and engineering to support the integration of technology and manufacturing innovation. DEE Lab’s design process methodology combines customer, technology, business and marketing research with structured analysis, interdisciplinary brainstorming, rapid prototyping and evaluation. Research deliverable include development of smart products and technology transfer, strategic product and systems concepts, sustainable product development, ethnographic studies, trends forecasting, ergonomic verification and envisioning new products and systems. Research guides companies in articulating the future or addressing immediate needs through a fresh independent perspective.

The DEE Lab is located within the Illinois Sustainable Technology Center and is a part of the Sustainable Electronics Initiative. William Bullock, a professor with the University of Illinois at Urbana-Champaign School of Art and Design is the director of the DEE lab.

== Competitions ==
=== Sustainable E-Waste Design Competition ===
The Sustainable E-Waste Design Competition is a way for University of Illinois students to get involved in the Sustainable Electronics Initiative. During the spring 2009 semester, students were challenged to create appealing, useful products from e-waste through a School of Art and Design course. Students conducted an e-waste collection on campus and twenty teams each developed useful items from the collected e-waste. The projects were judged by a group of industry representatives. Six of the teams were awarded a total of fifteen thousand dollars in scholarships provided by industry sponsors Wal-Mart, Dell, Motorola and Microsoft.

The E-Waste Design competition will occur during the Spring 2010, with the final judging occurring on April 20, 2010. This year, the competition will be international in scope, with participants submitting projects in the form of videos on YouTube.

== See also ==
- Solving the E-waste Problem (StEP)
- Electronic Product Environmental Assessment Tool
- Basel Action Network
- United States Environmental Protection Agency
- Takeback, when sellers or manufacturers accept returns of products at the end of their lives
