= Mark Hawthorne (author) =

American activist and writer (born 1962)

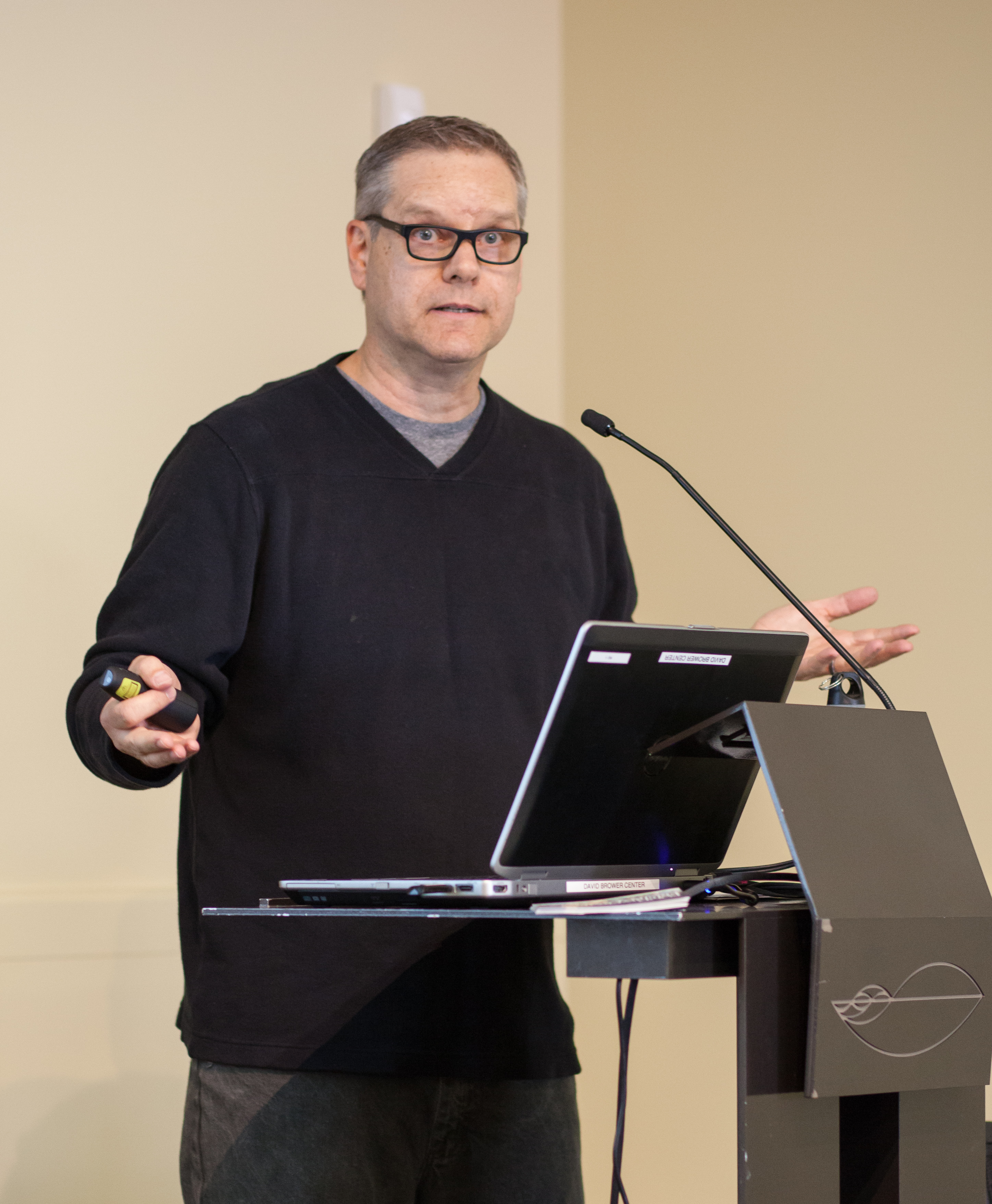
- Hawthorne in 2016
- Born: 1962 (age 63–64); Inglewood, California, US
- Education: California State University, Fullerton (B.A. in English, 1985)
- Occupation: Writer
- Years active: 1989–present
- Known for: Animal activism
- Notable work: Striking at the Roots: A Practical Guide to Animal Activism; Bleating Hearts: The Hidden World of Animal Suffering; A Vegan Ethic: Embracing a Life of Compassion Toward All; The Way of the Rabbit
- Spouse: lauren Ornelas (m. 2012)
- Website: markhawthorne.com

Mark Franklyn Hawthorne (born 1962) is an American animal rights advocate, vegan, and writer.

== Biography ==
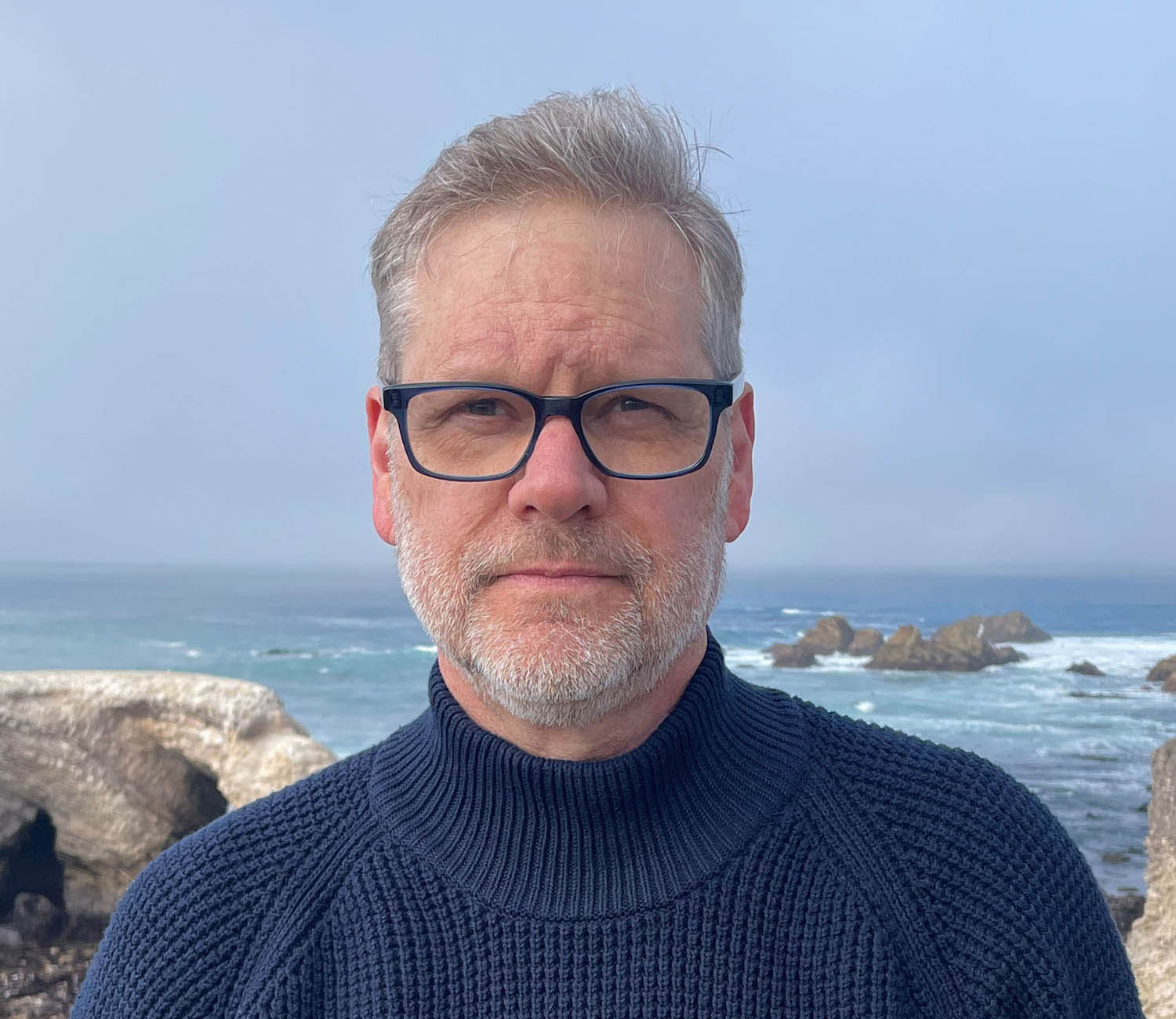
Mark Hawthorne in 2025.

Hawthorne is the author of five books: Striking at the Roots: A Practical Guide to Animal Activism (2007), Bleating Hearts: The Hidden World of Animal Suffering (2013), A Vegan Ethic: Embracing a life of Compassion Toward All (2016), The Way of the Rabbit (2021), and Eco-Spirituality and Human–Animal Relationships (2022).

In A Vegan Ethic, he urges vegans to be inclusive in their compassion, explaining that is the only course for activists to take if they want to free nonhuman animals from exploitation—that victory for the animal liberation movement will only come through working for liberation for all marginalized groups. His 2021 book, The Way of the Rabbit, explores the habitats and evolution of rabbits, their role in legend and literature, their place in popular culture, their biology, and their significance as household companions. He said he wrote The Way of the Rabbit because there are not enough nonfiction books about this animal, and he "wanted to create a fun book that celebrates their history and their personalities."

Hawthorne is a vegan and has published numerous entries in books and approximately 100 articles on veganism and animal rights in magazines and newspapers, including the Los Angeles Times, the San Francisco Chronicle, The Press Democrat, The Tribune (San Luis Obispo), VegNews, and Hinduism Today. He has been writing for magazines since about 1987.

He serves on the board of directors of Save the Buns, a nonprofit organization that provides sanctuary and finds loving homes for rabbits who have been rescued from product-testing and research labs.

Hawthorne is one of several people who provided information used in the writing of the book Uncaged: Top Activists Share Their Wisdom on Effective Farm Animal Advocacy (2013) by Ben Davidow.

James E. McWilliams says: "Bleating Hearts is the most comprehensive single compendium of animal exploitation that exists. ... Hawthorne forces us to expand that vision in ways even experienced ethical vegans will find informative and alarming."

Hawthorne won the 2003 Mona Schreiber Prize (1st place) for Humorous Fiction and Nonfiction.

In July 2008, Hawthorne created the Striking at the Roots website which he regularly updates with new essays, reviews, and news.

VegNews magazine was nominated for the 2010 Maggie Award for Best Feature, for Mark Hawthorne's article "Dried Up." Two years later, VegNews was nominated for the 2012 Maggie Award for Best Feature Article, for Hawthorne's article "Injustice for All."

Hawthorne's parents are John Franklyn Hawthorne and Cheryl Annette Hawthorne. Hawthorne attended Orange Coast College in Costa Mesa, California in 1980–1982. In 1983–1985 he attended California State University, Fullerton where he received a Bachelor of Arts in English.

In 1992, before he was vegan or an activist, Hawthorne joined two friends in Pamplona, Spain, and took part in the Running of the Bulls. Afterward, he felt ashamed.

An expanded, 10th-anniversary edition of Striking at the Roots: A Practical Guide to Animal Activism was released as a 416-page paperback in November 2018 (ISBN 978-1785358821).

Hawthorne is married to animal activist lauren Ornelas; they live in California.

== Publications ==
=== Books ===
- Hawthorne, Mark (December 20, 2007). Striking at the Roots: A Practical Guide to Animal Activism. Alresford, England: Changemakers Books. ISBN 978-1846940910.
  - Barbara Julian (February 22, 2008). "Striking At the Roots: a Great Guide For Animal Advocates". Animal (Review). Archived from the original on May 18, 2014.
- Hawthorne, Mark (November 7, 2013). Bleating Hearts: The Hidden World of Animal Suffering. Alresford, England: Changemakers Books. ISBN 978-1780998510.
  - Jennifer Molidor (December 11, 2013). "Bleating Hearts: the Hidden World of Animal Suffering". Animal Legal Defense Fund (Review).
- Hawthorne, Mark (July 14, 2016). A Vegan Ethic: Embracing A Life Of Compassion Toward All. Alresford, England: Changemakers Books. ISBN 978-1785354021.
  - Tim Ward (July 20, 2016). "Five Questions for Mark Hawthorne on the Deeper Meaning of Veganism". Huffington Post (Interview).
- Hawthorne, Mark (July 30, 2021). The Way of the Rabbit. Alresford, England: Changemakers Books. ISBN 978-1789047936.
  - In Tune to Nature podcast (June 28, 2021). "Interview with author Mark Hawthorne" (Interview).
- Hawthorne, Mark (May 27, 2022). Eco-Spirituality and Human–Animal Relationships. Alresford, England: Moon Books. ISBN 978-1785352485.
  - Kim Stallwood (January 26, 2024). "Mark Hawthorne" (Interview).

== See also ==
- Animal protectionism
