= Viva! (organisation) =

British animal rights group

- Founded: 1994; 32 years ago
- Founder: Juliet Gellatley
- Type: Animal rights
- Purpose: Animal rights, veganism
- Location: Bristol, England
- Region served: United Kingdom
- Method: Campaigning, undercover investigations, monitoring research
- Website: viva.org.uk

Viva! is a British animal rights group, which focuses on promoting veganism. It was founded by Juliet Gellatley in 1994. Viva! carries out undercover investigations to expose the abuse of factory farmed animals and produces information on how to go vegan, including recipes and shopping guides. It is a registered charity.

== Overview ==
Viva! was founded as Vegetarians' International Voice for Animals, a charity, in 1994.

Viva! is an animal rights' campaigning organisation, working on issues such as factory farming and slaughter and is based in Bristol, with a branch office in Poland. Campaigns have included End Factory Farming, Eat Green, Foie-Gras free Britain, Exotic Meat, Ban the Farrowing Crate, and the Dark Side of Dairy. Campaigns in 2018 included an investigation into Hogwood Pig Farm in Warwickshire, and Scary Dairy's "Trash" campaign, highlighting the dairy industry's forgotten victims: male calves. Viva! includes the organization Viva! Health (formerly The Vegetarian and Vegan Foundation), which is dedicated to nutrition and health.

== Activism ==
In 2005, Viva! campaigned against human consumption of cow's milk with an advert featuring a businessman drinking milk straight from a cows udder.

In 2009, Viva! criticised supermarket chain Tesco for turning 5,000 tonnes of meat that had passed its sell-by date into electricity by burning it to avoid wasting the meat. Viva! argued converting out-of-date meat into heat with CO_{2} as byproduct was not environmentally sustainable, but Tesco defended its decision. In 2010, Viva! protested against a branch of Budgens for supporting a "needless cull" of grey squirrels by selling squirrel meat in one of their stores in North London.

In 2012, Viva! stated that it favoured the development of cultured meat. "Certainly, with over 950 million land animals slaughtered in the UK each year, and the vast majority of them factory farmed in awful conditions, anything that saves animals from suffering is to be welcomed," former Viva! spokesman and campaign manager Justin Kerswell said, adding that individuals should make up their own mind on whether or not they would consume it themselves, because "vegetarianism and veganism aren't religions".

In 2022, Viva! ran a TV advert which showed a couple ordering pulled pork takeaway from a company called "Just Meat." When the takeaway arrives, it is a live piglet delivered with a meat cleaver.

== See also ==
- Nocton Dairies controversy
- List of animal rights groups
