= Catherine Nimmo =

American chiropractic and veganism activist

Catherine Tjeerda Nimmo
- Born: September 22, 1887; Rotterdam, Netherlands
- Died: January 22, 1985 (aged 97); Arroyo Grande, California, U.S.
- Occupations: Chiropractor, naturopath, activist

Catherine Tjeerda Nimmo (22 September 1887 – 22 January 1985) was an American chiropractor, naturopath and vegan activist.

== Biography ==
Nimmo was born in Rotterdam, Netherlands. She was a registered nurse and Doctor of Chiropractic. She moved to Oceano, California in 1948.

Nimmo was a vegetarian but became vegan in 1931 after witnessing a mother cow and her calf on opposite sides of a road, separated by fencing. In 1948, Nimmo and Rubin Abramowitz formed the first vegan organization in the United States known as the U.S. Vegan Society in Oceano, California. The Society lasted from 1948 to 1960 and was a predecessor to the American Vegan Society. Nimmo distributed copies of the UK's The Vegan Society magazine and corresponded with Freya Dinshah and H. Jay Dinshah. She joined the American Vegan Society and was its first paid member. She authored articles for the American Vegan Society magazine, which at that time was called Ahimsa.

Nimmo cared for animals in Oceano and was made an honorary lifetime member of the Humane Society.

Nimmo died from natural causes in Arroyo Grande, California on 22 January 1985, age 97.
