= William Shurtleff =

American food researcher and author (born 1941)

- Born: April 28, 1941 (age 85); Oakland, California
- Education: Stanford University
- Occupations: Researcher and writer about soyfoods
- Writing career
- Language: English
- Subject: Soy foods
- Notable works: The Book of Tofu, The Book of Miso, The Book of Tempeh
- Website: www.soyinfocenter.com

William Roy Shurtleff (born April 28, 1941) is an American researcher and writer about soy foods. Shurtleff and his former wife Akiko Aoyagi have written and published consumer-oriented cookbooks, handbooks for small- and large-scale commercial production, histories, and bibliographies of various soy foods. These books introduced soy foods such as tofu, tempeh, and miso on a wide scale to non-Asian Westerners, and are largely responsible for the establishment of non-Asian soy food manufacturers in the West beginning in the late 1970s. In 1980, Lorna Sass wrote in The New York Times, "The two people most responsible for catapulting tofu from the wok into the frying pan are William Shurtleff and Akiko Aoyagi." In 1995, Suzanne Hamlin wrote in The New York Times, "At the turn of the century there were two tofu suppliers in the United States. Today there are more than 200 tofu manufacturers...and tofu can be found in nearly every supermarket."

The increased availability and cultural acceptance of tofu and similar foods contributed to the development of manufactured soy-based products such as Tofutti and Tofurkey, and may have influenced the growth of the natural food and vegetarian movements that emerged alongside the counterculture of the 1960s.

== Early life ==
Shurtleff was born in Oakland, California on April 28, 1941. He attended Stanford University in Palo Alto, where he studied engineering. After graduating from Stanford, he joined the Peace Corps and taught school in Nigeria. He then joined the Tassajara Zen Center, where he meditated and worked as a cook for 2 1/2 years. He was also a student of Suzuki Roshi who sent him to Japan in 1971 in order to help Roshi set up a Tassajara center there. While in Japan, Shurtleff met his future wife Akiko Aoyagi, who at that time worked as a Tokyo-based fashion designer.

While he had initially developed an interest in soy foods at the Tassajara Zen Center, Shurtleff had also read the (then) recently released Diet for a Small Planet by Frances Moore Lappé, which argued that soybeans were a superior source of protein. Using Lappe's book as a reference, Shurtleff wanted to learn more about Tofu. Aoyagi then introduced him to "Kyoto's Haute cuisine Tofu restaurants" where a 12 course meal was about three dollars. It was during one of these meals that they decided to create "a tofu cookbook that that would show Westerners how to prepare tofu." Over the next few years they conducted research, traveling, visiting tofu factories, ashrams, and "grandmothers who still remember the old ways," learning the various elements of tofu production. They then began to work on the book, with Aoyagi focused on developing, creating, and writing recipes, both Eastern and Western, and providing the technical illustrations. Meanwhile, Shurtleff researched the production and manufacture of the soy products. They soon "decided to do for tofu and other soy foods what Johnny Appleseed did for apples."

In October 1972 Shurtleff and Aoyagi began full-time research on soy foods in Japan. In 1975 they published their first book, The Book of Tofu. In August 1976 they founded the Soyinfo Center (named Soyfoods Center until 2006) in Lafayette, California.

== Major works ==
All three books have recipes that do not use meat, poultry or fish products, though the authors mention some traditional uses of the soy foods with these ingredients. The books do have recipes that use dairy, eggs, and honey.

=== The Book of Tofu ===
The Book of Tofu (1975) is aimed at the general public in the West. It combines a cookbook with Asian and Western recipes, a history of tofu, and descriptions of small-scale producers of tofu in Japan. The book includes sections on related products such as soy milk, okara, fermented tofu and yuba.

=== The Book of Miso ===
Shurtleff and Aoyagi researched and wrote a similar book on miso, The Book of Miso (1976). It focused on Japanese miso, with some attention to similar condiments in other Asian cuisines.

=== The Book of Tempeh ===
Shurtleff and Aoyagi went to Indonesia to learn about the manufacture of tempeh, and published The Book of Tempeh in 1979. This book focuses on traditional Indonesian types of tempeh and tempeh recipes, but also contains Western recipes that use tempeh. This book built on a very small but established non-Asian constituency in the United States that was making and using tempeh, including The Farm in Tennessee.

=== Impact of their work ===
The Book of Tofu sold over 40,000 copies during its first year in print, and almost as many in the second year. By 1980 over 100,000 copies of The Book of Tofu were in print. At that time, their manuals for manufacturers of soy milk and tofu, miso, and tempeh were selling about 125 copies per month.

The new availability of soy foods, including tofu, miso, tempeh, and okara, in turn stimulated commercial production of foods based on them. For example, David Mintz invented the non-dairy, kosher pareve ice cream stubstitute Tofutti in 1981: "It was after he opened his Manhattan restaurant, he said in one of many versions of the story, that 'a Jewish hippie' tipped him to the potential of tofu. 'The Book of Tofu' (1979), by William Shurtleff and Akiko Aoyagi, became his new bible."

As of 2021, their printed and bound books have sold more than 830,000 copies.

Food writer Jonathan Kauffman states in Hippie Food: How Back-To-The-Landers, Longhairs, and Revolutionaries Changed the Way We Eat (2018), that Tofurky developed due to the influence of Frances Moore Lappé, Shurtleff and Aoyagi, and The Farm. He also credits the rise of Tofu shops, Tofu cookbooks, and vegetarian cookbooks that use Tofu in the West to Aoyagi and Shurtleff. In discussing Kauffman’s book, San Francisco Chronicle journalist Steve Silberman refers to Shurtleff and Aoyagi as "pioneers" who "placed tofu at the center of millions of vegetarian tables in the West after falling in love with the snowy pressed soy curds as Zen students in Kyoto."

American author and professor Rynn Berry interviewed Shurtleff and Aoyagi for a chapter in the "Visionaries" section of his 1995 book Famous Vegetarians and Their Favorite Recipes: Lives and Lore from Buddha to the Beatles. Additional "Visionaries" include Bronson Alcott, Sylvester Graham, John Harvey Kellogg, Henry Stephens Salt, and Frances Moore Lappe. Barry begins the chapter on Shurtleff and Aoyagi by asserting that in 1975, "few Americans had even the vaguest idea of what it [Tofu] was. Now [in 1995] it is sold in countless supermarkets and health food stores, and its name as well as its substance is on everyone’s lips. Credit for this extraordinary surge in popularity must go to William Shurtleff and his Tokyo-born wife, Akiko Aoyagi. They are the co-authors of The Book of Tofu which has become the bible for tofu enthusiasts." "The Rynn Berry Jr. Papers" in North Carolina State University Libraries’ Special Collections and Research Center, contains his research journal with "the transcript of an interview by Berry with soy food specialists William Shurtleff and Akiko Aoyagi" and the original illustration of the couple used in Famous Vegetarians.

== Research works and database ==
Over their careers, Shurtleff and Aoyagi have written, published, and assembled a wide variety of research material on soybeans and soyfoods. These include market studies, histories, technical manuals, and subject- and region-specific bibliographies. The SoyaScan database at the Soyinfo Center contains more than 100,000 documents, many unique. The Soyinfo Center has published 120 books that are available for free digital download.

Their book History of Soybeans and Soyfoods in Africa (1857-2009): Extensively Annotated Bibliography and Sourcebook received the 2011 STS Oberly Award for Bibliography in the Agricultural or Natural Sciences from the American Library Association.

== Personal life ==
Shurtleff and Aoyagi were married, but divorced in the early 1990's. They have a son.

== Partial bibliography ==
Shurtleff and Aoyagi have 66 books in print.

- Shurtleff, William; Aoyagi, Akiko (1975). The Book of Tofu. Autumn Press. ISBN 0-914398-05-9.
- Shurtleff, William; Aoyagi, Akiko (1976). The Book of Miso. Autumn Press. ISBN 0-394-73432-7.
- Shurtleff, William; Aoyagi, Akiko (1979). The Book of Tempeh. Harper & Row. ISBN 0-06-090710-X.

=== Additional ===
- Shurtleff, William; Aoyagi, Akiko. The Book of Kudzu: A Culinary & Healing Guide. Brookline, MA: Autumn Press, 1977. ISBN 0-394-42068-3.
- Shurtleff, William., Aoyagi, Akiko. Using Tofu, Tempeh & Other Soyfoods in Restaurants, Delis & Cafeterias. Lafayette, CA: Soyfoods Center, 1982. ISBN 0-933332-07-6.
- Shurtleff, William. Tempeh Production: A Craft and Technical Manual. Lafayette, CA: Soyfoods Center, 1986. ISBN 0-933332-23-8.
- Shurtleff, William; Aoyagi, Akiko. Mildred Lager - History of Her Work With Soyfoods and Natural Foods in Los Angeles (1900-1960): Extensively Annotated Bibliography and Sourcebook. Lafayette, CA: Soyinfo Center, 2009. ISBN 978-1-928914-26-6.
- Shurtleff, William; Aoyagi, Akiko. History of Natto and Its Relatives (1405–2012). Lafayette, CA, Soyinfo Center: 2012.
- Shurtleff, William; Aoyagi, Akiko. History of Roasted Whole Soy Flour (Kinako), Soy Coffee, and Soy Chocolate (1540–2012). Lafayette, CA: Soyinfo Center, 2012.
- Shurtleff, William; Aoyagi, Akiko. History of Soybean Crushing: Soy Oil and Soybean Meal (980-2016): Extensively Annotated Bibliography and Sourcebook. Lafayette, CA: Soyinfo Center, 2016.
- Shurtleff, William; Aoyagi, Akiko. History of Soybeans and Soyfoods in the Caribbean/West Indies (1767-2022). Lafayette, CA: Soyinfo Center, 2021.
