= Frey Ellis =

English consultant haematologist

- Born: Frey Richard Ellis; 22 September 1918; Allahabad, India
- Died: 11 August 1978; Kingston upon Thames
- Occupation: Haematologist
- Spouse: Joan Hodge (m. 1942)

Frey Richard Ellis (22 September 1918 – 11 August 1978) was a British consultant haematologist at Kingston Hospital, best known for his research on vegan nutrition. He was president of The Vegan Society from 1964 to 1978.

== Career ==
Ellis qualified from King's College London in 1943. He joined the RAMC and served in Italy until 1946. He was assistant pathologist at the London Clinic until 1949 and at the Hospital of St John and St Elizabeth. He obtained his MD in 1953 and joined the group laboratory at Kingston Hospital. In 1965, he was appointed consultant haematologist. Ellis was a vegan and took interest in nutrition. He was a scientific advisor to the Humane Research Trust and RSPCA.

Ellis became a committee member and vice-president of the Vegan Society in 1961 and was its president from 1964 until his death in 1978. In 1972, Ellis argued that the Vegan Society was gaining popularity, commenting that "we have 1,200 members, an increase of about 700 in the last eight years". He wrote articles for The Vegan magazine.

In 1976, Ellis appeared in the Open Door TV series in the episode "The Vegan Society: To a Brighter Future". In the episode, Ellis argued that vegans have lower blood cholesterol than meat-eaters.

== Legacy ==
Ellis has been cited as a pioneering scientist in the field of vegan nutrition. Brenda Davis and Vesanto Melina have described Ellis as a "gentle man worked to show the scientific world that a vegan diet could be nutritionally adequate".

In 1979, the Vegan Society established the Dr. Frey Ellis Research Fund in his memory. Freya Dinshah has cited Ellis as an influence on her parents and sister who became vegan.

== Selected publications ==
- Ellis, F. R.; Mumford, P. (1967). "The Nutritional Status of Vegans and Vegetarians". Proceedings of the Nutrition Society. 26 (2): 205–212. doi:10.1079/PNS19670038. PMID 5585938.
- Ellis, Frey R.; Montegriffo, V.M.E. (1970). "Veganism, Clinical Findings and Investigations". The American Journal of Clinical Nutrition. 23 (3): 249–255. doi:10.1093/ajcn/23.3.249. PMID 5436632.
- Vegan Nutrition. The Vegan Society. 1981. (with T. A. B. Sanders)
