= Dinshah =

Dinshah is a surname. Notable people with the surname include:

- Freya Dinshah (born 1941), Anglo-American veganism activist and writer
- H. Jay Dinshah (1933–2000), American veganism activist
