= Akiko Aoyagi =

Japanese-American writer and artist (born 1950)

- Born: January 24, 1950 (age 76); Tokyo, Japan
- Other name: Akiko Aoyagi Shurtleff
- Occupations: Food writer; artist
- Notable work: The Book of Tofu (1975); The Book of Miso (1976); The Book of Tempeh (1979)
- Spouse: William Shurtleff (divorced)
- Children: 1
- Website: facebook.com/mycellakiko

Akiko Aoyagi (born January 24, 1950), who also uses the name Akiko Aoyagi Shurtleff, is a Japanese-American food writer and artist. She is best known as the recipe developer, illustrator, and co-author (with her former husband, William Shurtleff) of the soy-based cookbook series The Book of Tofu (1975), The Book of Miso (1976), and The Book of Tempeh (1979), that had a strong impact on the natural foods and vegetarian movements within the American counterculture. She is the co-founder, with William Shurtleff, of the New Age Foods Study Center (in Tokyo and California), SoyInfo Center, and Soycrafters Association of North America.

== Biography ==
=== Early life and education ===
Akiko Aoyagi was born in Tokyo, Japan, on January 24, 1950. She attended the Quaker Friends School and then the Women's College of the Arts, where she studied Fashion Design. Her thesis project explored "designing clothing for children with physical and mental deficits."

After graduation, she worked as a fashion designer in Tokyo, where she lightened her hair and wore "tie-dye maxi-skirts." She was frustrated, however, as she found herself in "a pressure-packed, highspeed job and I did not like it. It was a superficial, very exhausting life which I wanted to change. I wanted to go to Africa with the Peace Corps." She also thought of becoming a Catholic nun.

In 1971, her sister set Aoyagi up on a blind date with William Shurtleff (an American who was a student of Suzuki Roshi at the Tassajara Zen Mountain Center, and was in Japan in order to help Roshi set up a center). Shurtleff was her sister's classmate in a Japanese class at a university in Tokyo. They discovered that they shared interests in Zen meditation. Ultimately, Shurtleff did not return to Tassajara, and Aoyagi "sold all her clothes, quit the fashion company, and moved in with him." They began to hitchhike together throughout Japan, and talked about traveling to India to visit ashrams.

=== Soy ===
==== The Books of Tofu, Miso, and Tempeh ====
During that same time period in 1971, Shurtleff read the (then) recently released Diet for a Small Planet by Frances Moore Lappé, which argued that soybeans were a superior source of protein. Using Lappe's book as a reference, Shurtleff wanted to learn more about Tofu. Aoyagi later noted that although she had grown up with Tofu, ("just like you grow up with bread in this country"), Shurtleff's interest in it gave her a new appreciation for the art of Tofu production. Aoyagi introduced Shurtleff to "Kyoto's Haute cuisine Tofu restaurants" where a 12-course meal was about three dollars. It was during one of these meals that they decided to create "a tofu cookbook that that would show Westerners how to prepare tofu." Aoyogi began to experiment with cooking tofu, "dredging up memories of dishes that she had grown up eating or had read about." Over the next few years they conducted research, traveling, visiting tofu factories, ashrams, and "grandmothers who still remember the old ways," learning the various elements of tofu production.

In 1972, they signed a book contract with Nahum and Beverly Stiskin, who ran the small independent publishing company Autumn Press (which published books on macrobiotics and the Shinto religion). Shurtleff apprenticed with "tofu master," Toshio Arai, to learn traditional approaches to tofu production, and was sometimes joined by Aoyagi. Aoyagi began to test methods of reproducing the process at home, taking "more than one hundred times to get a reliable, reproducible method that [Shurtleff] could describe in words and she could illustrate with in-brush sketches." She began by "re-creating the recipes she would see in tofu shops, finding uses for soybeans at all points during the process." She would then "document each recipe in a mix of English and Japanese." She also began to research western cookbooks such as The Joy of Cooking, "and picked out dishes she thought she could remake with tofu." In addition, she was creating illustrations for the recipes.

The Book of Tofu, which contained all of Aoyagi's crafted recipes and related illustrations, was published by Autumn Press in 1975. According to The New York Times, it was "received so enthusiastically," that it was picked up by Ballantine Books for a mass market edition the following year. Barry adds that the original 5,000 copies sold out within the first month, and that 10,000 copies were printed in 1976. In response, Aoyagi and Shurtleff next produced The Book of Miso (1976).

Next, they came to the United States and traveled around the country in a Dodge Ram van to publicize both books. They gave interviews, met countercultural communities, and visited Zen centers. Aoyagi later remembered the experience of sixty-four stops in four months as "grueling." They also visited the vegan-based intentional community, The Farm, as Shurtleff had previously been in communication with them about Tempeh production, and had a chance to study it while there. The successful tour led to high book sales. In addition, in 1979, they published The Book of Tempeh (1979).

==== Soy centers and organizations ====
In 1975, Aoyagi and Shurtleff co-founded the New Age Foods Study Center (in Tokyo and California), where they tested recipes and distributed information on soy. The next year in 1976, Aoyagi and Shurtleff co-founded the SoyInfo Center, which they intended to be the "world's leading source of information on soy, especially soyfoods, new industrial uses, and history, in electronic database, online and printed book formats." Barry states that via the Center, Aoyagi and Shurtleff were able to act as "consultants to the growing international soyfoods industry." Finally, in 1978, Aoyagi and Shurtleff co-founded the Soycrafters Association of North America that held conferences attended by countercultural food companies.

=== Personal life ===
Aoyagi and Shurtleff were married, but later divorced in the early 1990s. They have a son.

== Legacy ==
Food writer Jonathan Kauffman states in Hippie Food: How Back-To-The-Landers, Longhairs, and Revolutionaries Changed the Way We Eat (2018), that Tofurky developed due to the influence of Frances Moore Lappé, Aoyagi and Shurtleff, and The Farm. He also credits the rise of tofu shops, tofu cookbooks, and vegetarian cookbooks that use tofu in the West to Aoyagi and Shurtleff. Discussing Kauffman's book, Steve Silberman refers to Aoyagi and Shurtleff as "pioneers" who "placed tofu at the center of millions of vegetarian tables in the West after falling in love with the snowy pressed soy curds as Zen students in Kyoto."

American author and professor Rynn Berry interviewed Aoyagi and Shurtleff for a chapter in the "Visionaries" section of his 1995 book Famous Vegetarians and Their Favorite Recipes: Lives and Lore from Buddha to the Beatles. Additional "Visionaries" include Bronson Alcott, Sylvester Graham, John Harvey Kellogg, Henry Stephens Salt, and Frances Moore Lappe. Barry begins the chapter on Aoyagi and Shurtleff by asserting that in 1975, "few Americans had even the vaguest idea of what it [Tofu] was. Now [in 1995] it is sold in countless supermarkets and health food stores, and its name as well as its substance is on everyone's lips. Credit for this extraordinary surge in popularity must go to William Shurtleff and his Tokyo-born wife, Akiko Aoyagi. They are the co-authors of The Book of Tofu which has become the bible for tofu enthusiasts." "The Rynn Berry Jr. Papers" in North Carolina State University Libraries' Special Collections and Research Center, contains his research journal with "the transcript of an interview by Berry with soy food specialists William Shurtleff and Akiko Aoyagi" and the original illustration of the couple used in Famous Vegetarians.

== Partial bibliography ==
Aoyagi and Shurtleff have 66 books in print.

- Shurtleff, William; Aoyagi, Akiko (1975). The Book of Tofu. Autumn Press. ISBN 978-0-914398-05-9.
- Shurtleff, William; Aoyagi, Akiko (1976). The Book of Miso. Autumn Press. ISBN 978-0-394-73432-3.
- Shurtleff, William; Aoyagi, Akiko (1977). The Book of Kudzu: A Culinary & Healing Guide. Autumn Press. ISBN 978-0-394-42068-4.
- Shurtleff, William; Aoyagi, Akiko (1979). The Book of Tempeh. HarperCollins. ISBN 978-0-06-090710-5.
- Shurtleff, William; Aoyagi, Akiko (1982). Using Tofu, Tempeh & Other Soyfoods in Restaurants, Delis & Cafeterias. Lafayette, CA: Soyfoods Center. ISBN 978-0-933332-07-2.
- Shurtleff, William; Aoyagi, Akiko (2009). Mildred Lager - History of Her Work With Soyfoods and Natural Foods in Los Angeles (1900-1960) (PDF). Lafayette, CA: Soyinfo Center. ISBN 978-1-928914-26-6.
- Shurtleff, William; Aoyagi, Akiko (2012). History of Natto and Its Relatives (1405-2012) (PDF). Lafayette, CA: Soyinfo Center. ISBN 978-1-928914-42-6.
- Shurtleff, William; Aoyagi, Akiko (2012). History of Roasted Whole Soy Flour (Kinako), Soy Coffee, and Soy Chocolate (1540-2012) (PDF). Lafayette, CA: Soyinfo Center.
- Shurtleff, William; Aoyagi, Akiko (2016). History of Soybean Crushing: Soy Oil and Soybean Meal (980-2016) (PDF). Lafayette, CA: Soyinfo Center.
- Shurtleff, William; Aoyagi, Akiko (2021). History of Soybeans and Soyfoods in the Caribbean/West Indies (1767-2022) (PDF). Lafayette, CA: Soyinfo Center.
