= North American Vegetarian Society =

Charity and activist organization

- Tax ID no.: EIN 23-7399322
- Legal status: 501(c) organization
- Headquarters: Dolgeville, New York
- President, Treasurer: Sharon Graff
- Website: navs-online.org

The North American Vegetarian Society (NAVS) is a charity and activist organization with the stated objectives of supporting vegetarians and informing the public about the benefits of vegetarianism.

It was initially founded in 1974 to organize the International Vegetarian Union's 1975 World Vegetarian Congress in Orono, Maine, which has been called the most significant event of the vegetarian movement in the United States in the 20th century.

In 1977, the organization started an annual event, World Vegetarian Day. The following year the International Vegetarian Union joined in holding the event. The event is celebrated October 1 of each year and kicks off a month-long event, Vegetarian Awareness Month, which ends November 1 with World Vegan Day.

== Vegan Hall of Fame ==
NAVS initiated the Vegetarian Hall of Fame (now the Vegan Hall of Fame) in 1990, which has enshrined 33 activists.

Vegan Hall of Fame members
Name	Known for	Year of award
Freya Dinshah	American Vegan Society	1990
H. Jay Dinshah	American Vegan Society	1990
Helen Nearing	Simple living advocate and vegetarian	1991
Scott Nearing	Simple living advocate and vegetarian	1991
Michael Klaper	Physician and author	1992
George Eisman	Registered dietitian and author	1993
Paul Obis	Founder and editor of Vegetarian Times	1994
Mahatma Gandhi	Indian independence advocate and vegetarian	1995
Alex Hershaft	Co-founder and president of Farm Animal Rights Movement	1998
Howard Lyman	Livestock farmer turned vegan, a vegan and animal rights activist	2002
Richard H. Schwartz	Professor of mathematics, president of Jewish Veg	2005
T. Colin Campbell	Professor of nutritional biochemistry and advocate of a plant-based diet	2006
Brenda Davis	Registered dietitian and author	2007
Joanne Stepaniak	Author of vegetarian and vegan cookbooks	2008
Caldwell Esselstyn	Cardiologist, Olympic gold medalist, vegan	2010
Neal D. Barnard	Founding president of Physicians Committee for Responsible Medicine	2011
Hans Diehl	Physician and plant-based nutrition author	2015
Miyoko Schinner	Founder of vegan cheese producer Miyoko's Creamery	2016
Michael Greger	Physician and plant-based nutrition author	2019
Kim A. Williams Sr., MD	Vegan cardiologist who promotes plant-based eating for better heart health.	2023
Victoria Moran	Founder of Main Street Vegan Academy.	2024
Milton Mills, MD	Vegan Physician	2025
Dr. Carol & Dr. Ted Barnett	Vegans with Rochester Lifestyle Medicine Institute	2026

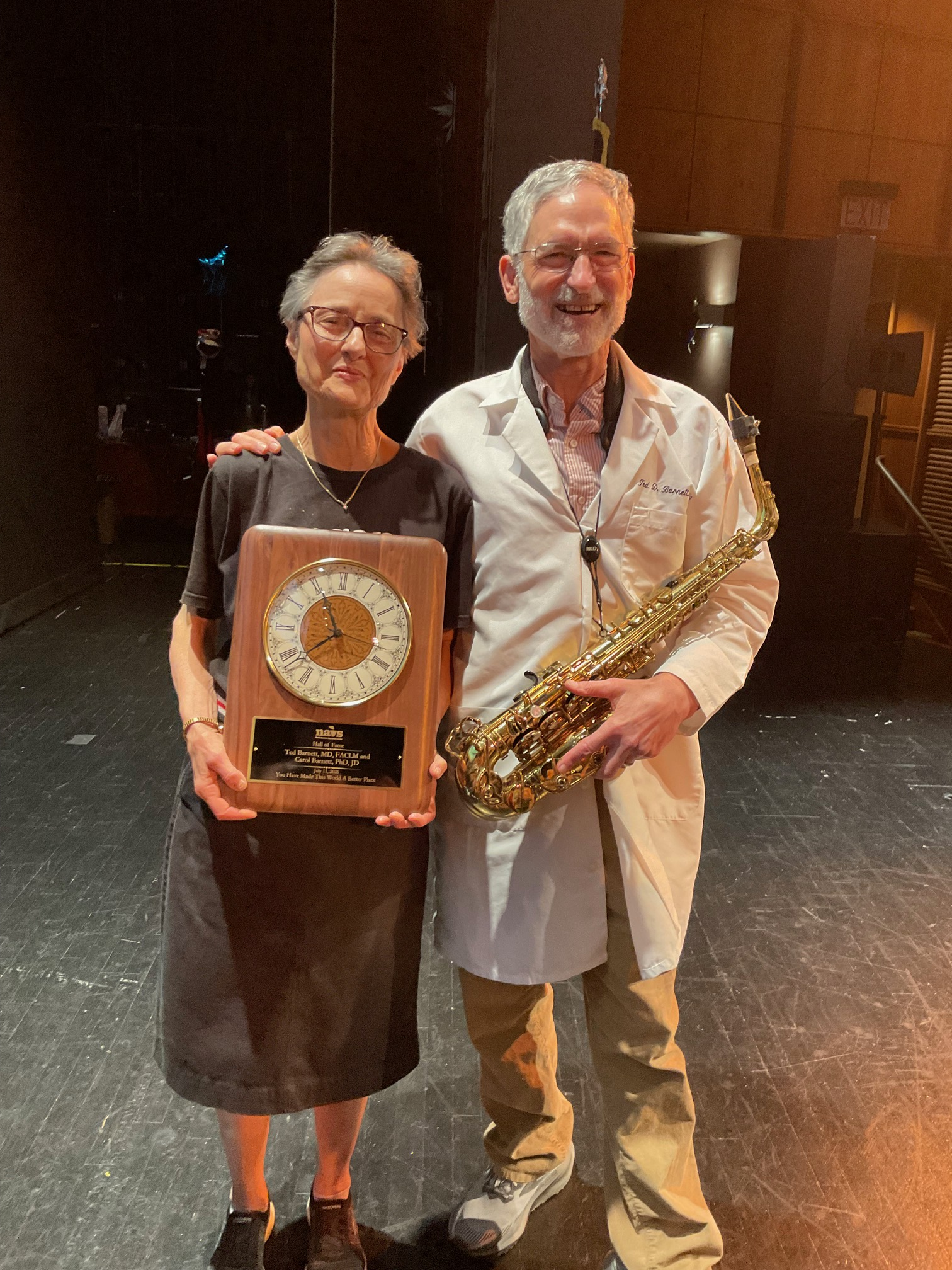
Carol and Ted Barnett, 2026 Vegan Hall of Fame Awardees

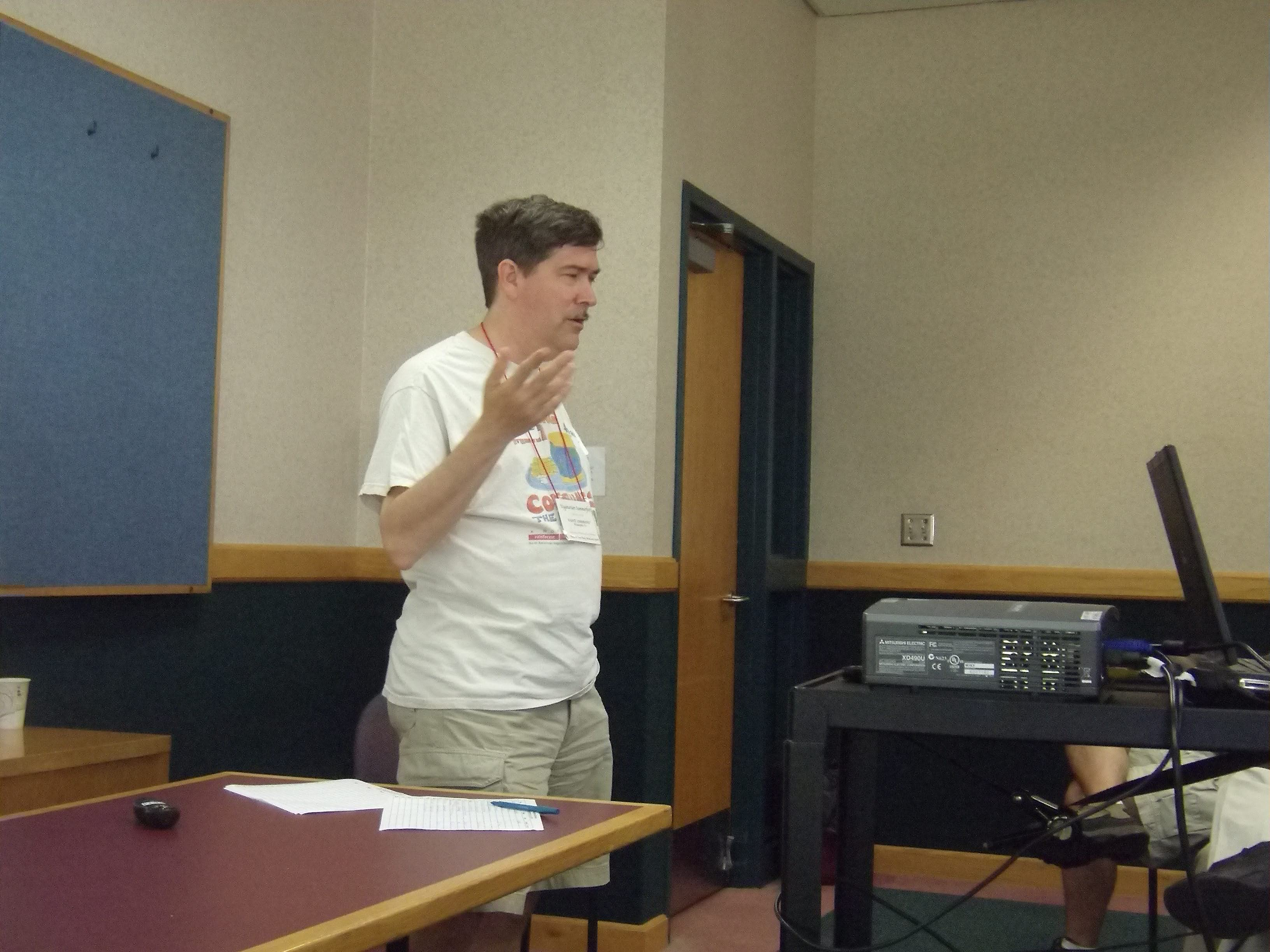
Vance Lehmkuhl leading workshop at 2012 NAVS Vegetarian Summerfest at UPittJohnstown in Johnstown PA

== NAVS Vegan Summerfest ==
Since 1974, the NAVS has run an annual vegetarian summer conference - originally for 9–10 days encompassing two full weekends, on a college or university campus (often in Pennsylvania). In 199x the summer conference's name was changed to NAVS Vegetarian Summerfest (with all vegan meals). In 2019, the name was changed to NAVS Vegan Summerfest. During this now 5-day event, the inductee for the Vegan Hall of Fame is announced and celebrated. The most frequent Summerfest site is the University of Pittsburgh-Johnstown (UPJ) in Johnstown, Pennsylvania. In 1996, the World Vegetarian Congress was held simultaneously with the NAVS Vegetarian Summerfest, in Johnstown. Three international vegetarian conferences have been held simultaneously with the NAVS Vegan Summerfests.

== See also ==
- American Vegan Society
- List of vegetarian and vegan organizations
