= Brenda Davis =

Canadian dietitian and writer

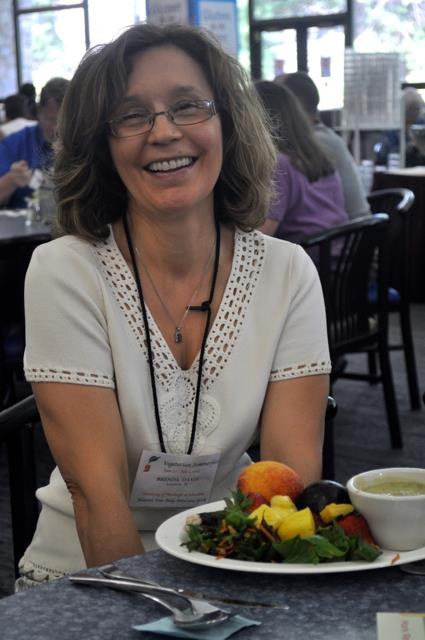
- Brenda Davis, MS, RD, at 2012 NAVS Vegetarian Summerfest in Johnstown PA
- Born: Canada
- Occupations: Dietitian, author, speaker
- Years active: 1982–present
- Known for: Veganism, nutrition
- Spouse: Paul Davis
- Children: 2: Cory Davis and Leena Markatchev
- Awards: Vegetarian Hall of Fame inductee 2007
- Website: BrendaDavisRD

Brenda Davis is a Canadian registered dietitian and advocate of plant-based nutrition. She has co-authored several popular books on vegan diets.

== Biography ==
Davis obtained an honors degree in Human Nutrition from the University of Guelph and an internship in Ottawa, Ontario. She was lead dietitian in a diabetes research project in the Marshall Islands.

Davis is a past chair of the Vegetarian Nutrition Dietetic Practice Group of the Academy of Nutrition and Dietetics. She has authored many books on plant-based nutrition with nearly a million copies in print.

Davis recommends a whole food plant-based (WFPB) diet that is low in saturated fat. In 2014, in response to inaccurate media claims about saturated fat not being bad for health, Davis commented that "saturated fats still increases blood cholesterol levels and causes all sorts of problems. But what we’re starting to learn is that refined carbohydrates can be just as bad".

She was inducted into the Vegan Hall of Fame in 2007. Davis was a speaker at the 38th IVU World Vegetarian Congress in Germany. She was the 2022 recipient of the Plantrician Project's Luminary Award.

Davis is a council member of True Health Initiative and is a scientific advisor for the Physicians Committee for Responsible Medicine.

== Personal life ==
Davis resides in Calgary, Alberta with her husband Paul. She became vegetarian in 1989 and a vegan in 2000.

== Selected publications ==
- Becoming Vegan: The Complete Guide to Adopting a Healthy Plant-Based Diet (with Vesanto Melina, 2000)
- Dairy-Free and Delicious: 120 Lactose-free Recipes (with Bryanna Clark Grogan and Joanne Stepaniak, 2001)
- Defeating Diabetes (with Thomas Barnard, 2003)
- The New Becoming Vegetarian: The Essential Guide to a Healthy Vegetarian Diet (2003)
- Becoming Raw: The Essential Guide to Raw Vegan Diets (with Vesanto Melina and Rynn Berry, 2013)
- Becoming Vegan: Comprehensive Edition (with Vesanto Melina, 2014)
- The Kick Diabetes Cookbook: An Action Plan and Recipes for Defeating Diabetes (2018)
- Kick Diabetes Essentials: The Diet and Lifestyle Guide (2019)
- Nourish: The Definitive Plant-Based Nutrition Guide for Families (with Reshma Shah, 2021)
- Plant-Powered Protein: Nutrition Essentials and Dietary Guidelines for All Ages (with Vesanto Melina, 2023)
