= Oceano, California =

Oceano
- Census designated place
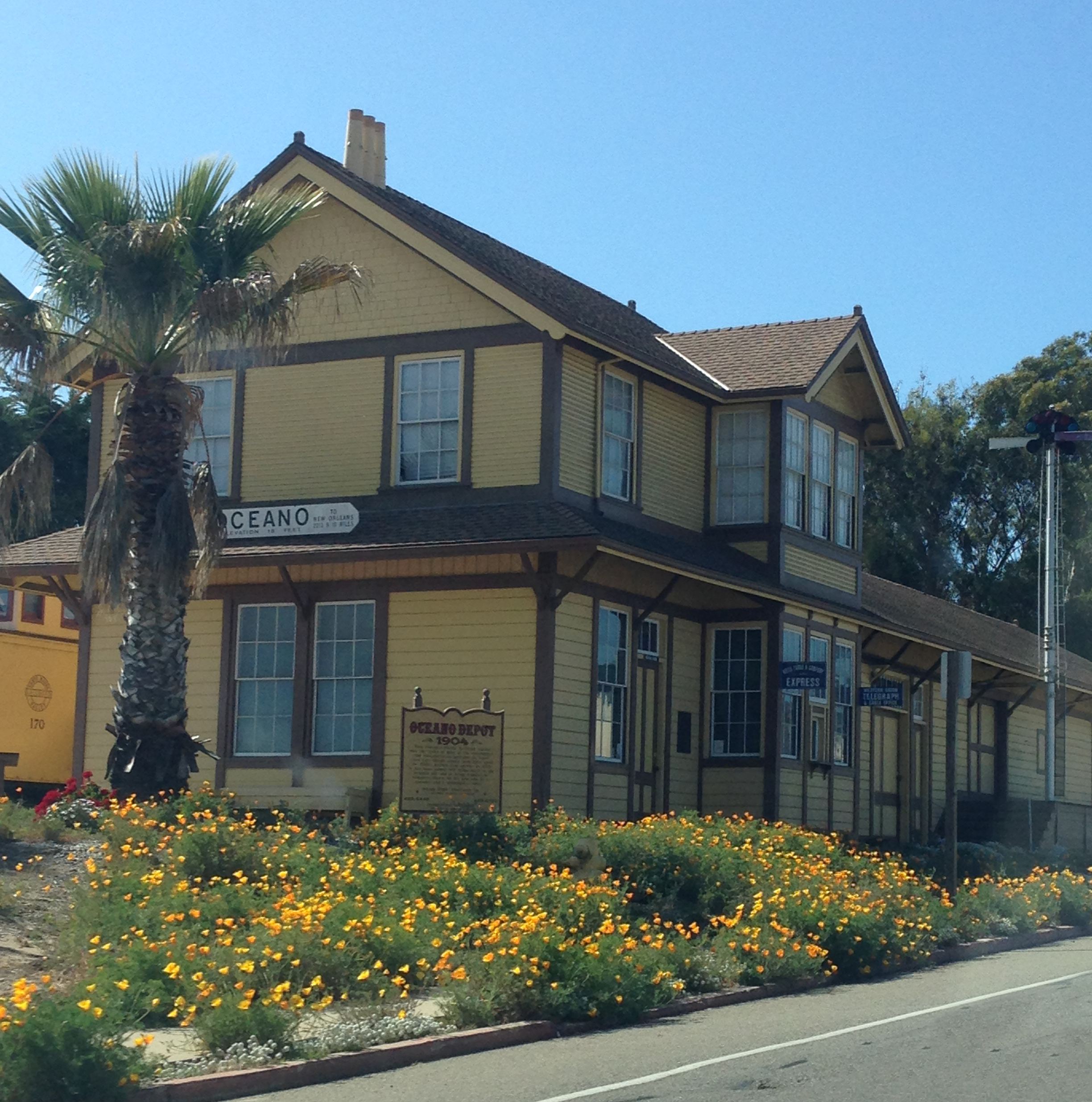
- Oceano Depot

- Location in San Luis Obispo County and the state of California
- Coordinates: 35°6′10″N 120°36′41″W
- Country: United States
- State: California
- County: San Luis Obispo

Area
  - Total: 1.552 sq mi (4.019 km^{2})
  - Land: 1.536 sq mi (3.979 km^{2})
  - Water: 0.015 sq mi (0.039 km^{2}) 0.98%
- Elevation: 30 ft (9 m)

Population (April 1, 2020)
  - Total: 7,183
  - Density: 4,676/sq mi (1,805/km^{2})
- Time zone: UTC-8 (Pacific)
  - Summer (DST): UTC-7 (PDT)
- ZIP codes: 93445, 93475
- Area code: 805
- FIPS code: 06-53294
- GNIS feature ID: 1652760

Oceano (Spanish: Océano, meaning "Ocean") is a census-designated place (CDP) in San Luis Obispo County, California, United States. The population was 7,183 at the 2020 census, down from 7,286 at the 2010 census.

== Geography ==
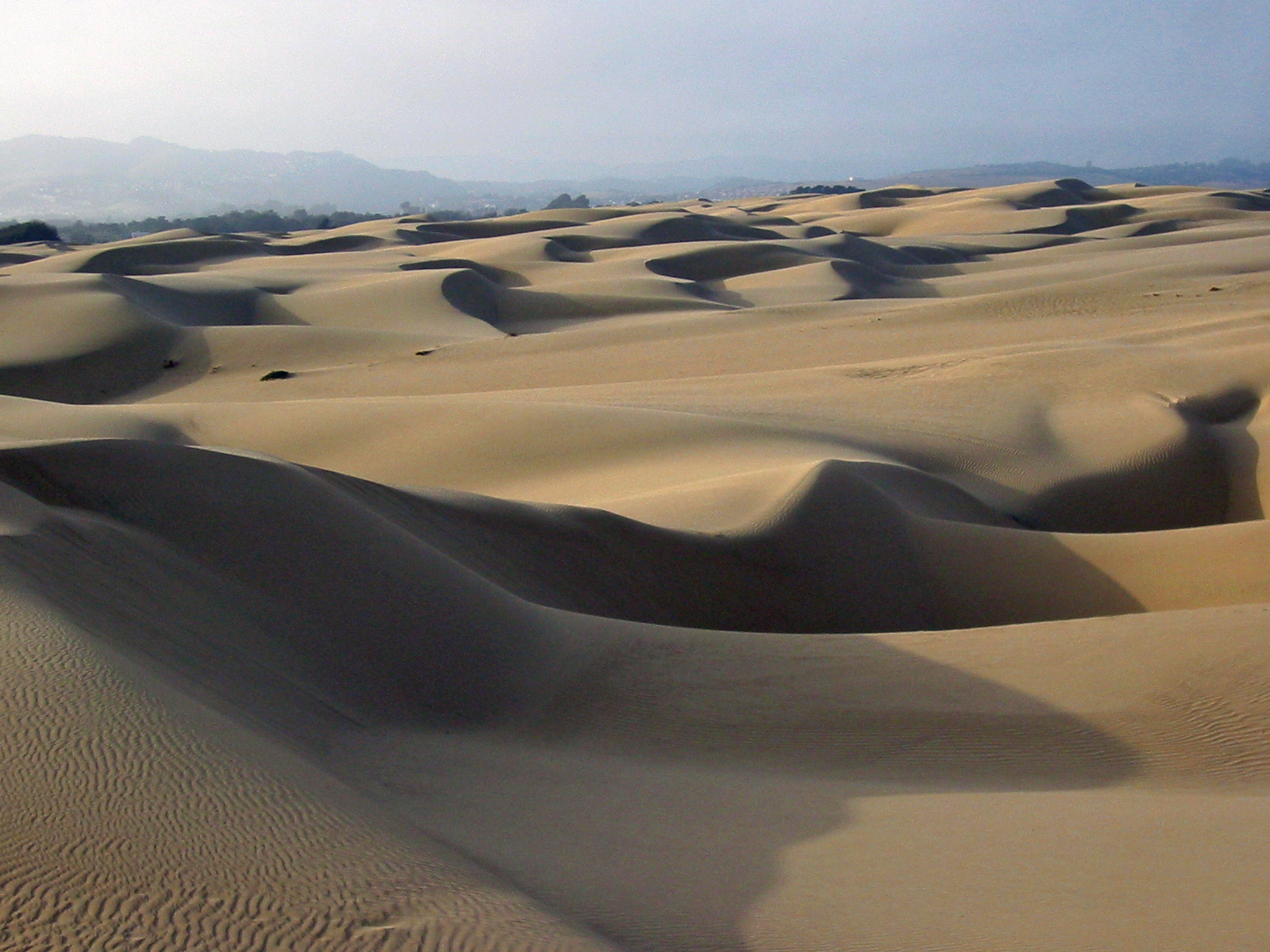
Oceano Dunes State Vehicular Recreation Area

Oceano is located at 35°6′10″N 120°36′41″W (35.102680, -120.611471).

Oceano is part of the 5 Cities Metropolitan Area. According to the United States Census Bureau, the CDP has a total area of 1.5 square miles (3.9 km^{2}), of which 1.5 square miles (3.9 km^{2}) is land and 0.02 square miles (0.052 km^{2}) (0.98%) is water.

Oceano's beach is the Oceano Dunes State Vehicular Recreation Area, a 1,500 acres (6.1 km^{2}) coastal sand dune. As the only state park in California where visitors may drive vehicles on the beach, tourists are attracted from all over the United States. Activities on this beach include riding the sand dunes on all-terrain-vehicles, swimming, clamming, camping, surfing, surf fishing, hiking, and bird watching.

== Demographics ==
Historical population
Census	Pop.	Note	%±
1950	1,446		—
1960	1,317		−8.9%
1970	2,564		94.7%
1980	4,478		74.6%
1990	6,169		37.8%
2000	7,260		17.7%
2010	7,286		0.4%
2020	7,183		−1.4%
U.S. Decennial Census; 1860–1870 1880-1890; 1900 1910 1920; 1930 1940 1950; 1960 1970 1980; 1990 2000 2010

=== 2020 census ===
As of the 2020 census, Oceano had a population of 7,183 and a population density of 4,676.4 inhabitants per square mile (1,805.6/km^{2}). 99.6% of residents lived in urban areas, while 0.4% lived in rural areas.

The age distribution was 20.9% under the age of 18, 8.3% aged 18 to 24, 26.8% aged 25 to 44, 26.0% aged 45 to 64, and 18.1% who were 65 years of age or older. The median age was 40.5 years. For every 100 females there were 97.0 males, and for every 100 females age 18 and over there were 94.4 males age 18 and over.

The census reported that 99.7% of the population lived in households, 0.3% lived in non-institutionalized group quarters, and no one was institutionalized. There were 2,653 households, out of which 29.9% had children under the age of 18 living in them. Of all households, 42.7% were married-couple households, 8.7% were cohabiting couple households, 30.0% had a female householder with no spouse or partner present, and 18.6% had a male householder with no spouse or partner present. About 26.7% of all households were made up of individuals, and 12.4% had someone living alone who was 65 years of age or older. The average household size was 2.7. There were 1,710 families (64.5% of all households).

There were 3,177 housing units at an average density of 2,068.4 units per square mile (798.6 units/km^{2}), of which 2,653 (83.5%) were occupied. Of occupied units, 54.6% were owner-occupied and 45.4% were occupied by renters. 16.5% of housing units were vacant. The homeowner vacancy rate was 1.9% and the rental vacancy rate was 4.1%.

Racial composition as of the 2020 census
Race	Number	Percent
White	3,900	54.3%
Black or African American	65	0.9%
American Indian and Alaska Native	129	1.8%
Asian	141	2.0%
Native Hawaiian and Other Pacific Islander	17	0.2%
Some other race	1,456	20.3%
Two or more races	1,475	20.5%
Hispanic or Latino (of any race)	3,359	46.8%

=== Demographic estimates ===
In 2023, the US Census Bureau estimated that 16.9% of the population were foreign-born. Of all people aged 5 or older, 70.9% spoke only English at home, 27.6% spoke Spanish, 0.0% spoke other Indo-European languages, 0.5% spoke Asian or Pacific Islander languages, and 1.0% spoke other languages. Of those aged 25 or older, 79.9% were high school graduates and 18.6% had a bachelor's degree.

=== Income and poverty ===
The median household income in 2023 was $69,448, and the per capita income was $38,764. About 12.0% of families and 17.1% of the population were below the poverty line.

=== 2010 census ===
At the 2010 census Oceano had a population of 7,286. The population density was 4,710.2 inhabitants per square mile (1,818.6 inhabitants per square kilometer). The ethnic makeup of Oceano was 5,105 (70.1%) White, 62 (0.9%) African American, 120 (1.6%) Native American, 165 (2.3%) Asian, 7 (0.1%) Pacific Islander, 1,509 (20.7%) from other races, and 318 (4.4%) from two or more races. Hispanic or Latino of any race were 3,484 persons (47.8%).

The whole population lived in households, no one lived in non-institutionalized group quarters and no one was institutionalized.

There were 2,603 households, 904 (34.7%) had children under the age of 18 living in them, 1,147 (44.1%) were opposite-sex married couples living together, 360 (13.8%) had a female householder with no husband present, 197 (7.6%) had a male householder with no wife present. There were 197 (7.6%) unmarried opposite-sex partnerships, and 38 (1.5%) same-sex married couples or partnerships. 680 households (26.1%) were one person and 266 (10.2%) had someone living alone who was 65 or older. The average household size was 2.80. There were 1,704 families (65.5% of households); the average family size was 3.39.

The population was spread out, with 1,738 people (23.9%) under the age of 18, 747 people (10.3%) aged 18 to 24, 2,028 people (27.8%) aged 25 to 44, 1,870 people (25.7%) aged 45 to 64, and 903 people (12.4%) who were 65 or older. The median age was 35.4 years. For every 100 females, there were 101.9 males. For every 100 females age 18 and over, there were 100.7 males.

There were 3,117 housing units at an average density of 2,015.1 per square mile, of the occupied units 1,355 (52.1%) were owner-occupied and 1,248 (47.9%) were rented. The homeowner vacancy rate was 3.7%; the rental vacancy rate was 5.9%. 3,444 people (47.3% of the population) lived in owner-occupied housing units and 3,842 people (52.7%) lived in rental housing units.

== History ==
The environs of Oceano were the home of "Halcyon," a utopian religious community established in 1903 by the theosophical Temple of the People, based in Syracuse, New York. The group, which believed in channeling unseen electromagnetic forces in an effort to attain human perfection, constructed a number of buildings in association with their colonizing effort, including the Blue Star Memorial Temple and the Halcyon Hotel and Sanatorium.

In 1948, Oceano, was the site of the founding by Catherine Nimmo (a registered nurse and Doctor of Chiropractic who had recently moved there from the Netherlands) and Rubin Abramowitz (an engineer) of the U.S. Vegan Society, the first vegan society in the United States. The Society lasted from 1948 to 1960 and was a predecessor to the American Vegan Society.

== Culture ==
- Irish poet and Celtic mythologist Ella Young's final years were spent in Oceano (she died there in 1956).

== Government ==
The Oceano Community Services District provides the following services: fire and emergency, water, wastewater collection, solid waste, parks and recreation, and limited street lighting.

As an unincorporated town in San Luis Obispo County, Oceano is in the Board of Supervisors 4th District.

In the state legislature Oceano is in the 21st senatorial district, represented by Democrat Monique Limón, and in the 30th Assembly district, represented by Democrat Dawn Addis.

In the United States House of Representatives, Oceano is in California's 24th congressional district, represented by Democrat Salud Carbajal.

== Education ==
Oceano is served by the Lucia Mar Unified School District.

== See also ==
- Oceano County Airport
