= American Vegan Center =

Nonprofit organization in Pennsylvania

- Formation: 2021
- Founder: American Vegan Society
- Type: Nonprofit
- Legal status: Active
- Headquarters: 17 North 2nd Street, Philadelphia, Pennsylvania
- Region served: United States
- Key people: Vance Lehmkuhl
- Parent organization: American Vegan Society
- Website: americanvegan.org/avc

The American Vegan Center was a nonprofit educational space operated by the American Vegan Society (AVS), located in the Old City neighborhood of Philadelphia, Pennsylvania. Opened in September 2021, it was the first public facility operated by AVS since its founding in 1960. The center promoted veganism through public outreach, historical interpretation, and community-based events.

== History ==
The center officially opened on September 9, 2021, at 17 North 2nd Street. Its location was chosen for its proximity to sites important to the history of vegetarianism and veganism in the United States. The American Vegan Center was established to further the mission of the American Vegan Society by offering a dedicated space for educational programming, events, and outreach activities centered on plant-based living.

Although the center operated under AVS, it was not a separate organization. Its founding highlighted AVS's commitment to showcasing Philadelphia's historical role in the development of the American vegetarian movement. The center's director, Vance Lehmkuhl, is a prominent advocate for veganism through media and public engagement.

At the end of August 2026, the Center closed from insufficient funding.

== Programs and Activities ==
The American Vegan Center offered a range of programs focused on vegan education, historical interpretation, and community engagement. Its initiatives aimed to inform the public about vegan principles, support those transitioning to plant-based living, and highlight Philadelphia's historical role in the vegetarian movement.

- Educational Resources: The center provided literature, books, and informational materials related to veganism, nutrition, and plant-based living.
- Walking Tours: Led by Director Vance Lehmkuhl, the center offered 75-minute guided walking tours exploring Philadelphia's connections to vegetarian and vegan history. Featured figures include Benjamin Lay, Benjamin Franklin, Caroline Earle White, and Anthony Benezet.
- Public Events and Workshops: For five years, the center hosted presentations and workshops featuring authors, chefs, health professionals, and scholars. Topics address various aspects of veganism, including health, ethics, sustainability, and history.
- Community Engagement: The AVC organized local events such as the Philly Vegan Awards and the Philly Vegan Cheesesteak Contest to recognize and celebrate vegan contributions in the region.
- Local Partnerships: The center collaborated with Philadelphia-based businesses and organizations to promote vegan-friendly products, services, and initiatives throughout the community.

== Leadership ==
Vance Lehmkuhl served as the Director of the American Vegan Center. A longtime journalist, cartoonist, and advocate for veganism, Lehmkuhl is known for his work with the Philadelphia Daily News and The Philadelphia Inquirer, where he wrote the "V for Veg" column. He is also the Communications Director for the American Vegan Society and its Vegan Travel Coordinator.

== See also ==
- American Vegan Society
- List of vegetarian and vegan organizations
- Vegetarianism in the United States
