= George Eisman =

American dietitian and veganism activist

- Born: August 5, 1950; Miami, Florida, U.S.
- Died: April 23, 2017 (aged 66); Watkins Glen, New York, U.S.
- Education: University of Toronto (MA, 1975); Florida International University (MA, 1976)
- Occupations: Activist; author; dietitian

George Eisman (August 5, 1950 – April 23, 2017) was an American registered dietitian and veganism activist. He was the co-founder of the Academy of Nutrition and Dietetics Vegetarian Nutrition Practice Group. In 1993, he was inducted into the Vegan Hall of Fame.

== Early life and education ==
Eisman was born in Miami. He was educated at Middlebury College and obtained a bachelor's degree from Florida State University. In 1975, he obtained a master's degree in geography from the University of Toronto and a master's degree in nutrition from Florida International University in 1976.

== Career ==
Eisman was one of seven reviewers for the 1988 position of the American Dietetic Association on vegetarian diets. He taught vegan nutrition at Miami Dade College. He is credited with establishing the first accredited program on vegan studies in the United States. The course influenced T. Colin Campbell. His lectures were published in 1993.

He co-founded the Academy of Nutrition and Dietetics Vegetarian Nutrition Practice Group. In 1994, he wrote The Most Noble Diet and in 2015 A Guide to Vegan Nutrition. He was a regular speaker at the North American Vegetarian Society's Summerfest. He was nutrition director of the Coalition for Cancer Prevention Through Plant-Based Eating.

== Death ==
Eisman died from cancer at Watkins Glen, New York in 2017, aged 66.

== Selected publications ==
- Basic Course in Vegetarian and Vegan Nutrition (1993)
- The Most Noble Diet: Food Selection and Ethics (1994)
- Don't Let Your Diet Add to Your Cancer Risk (2008)
- A Guide to Vegan Nutrition (2015)
