= Oceano County Airport =

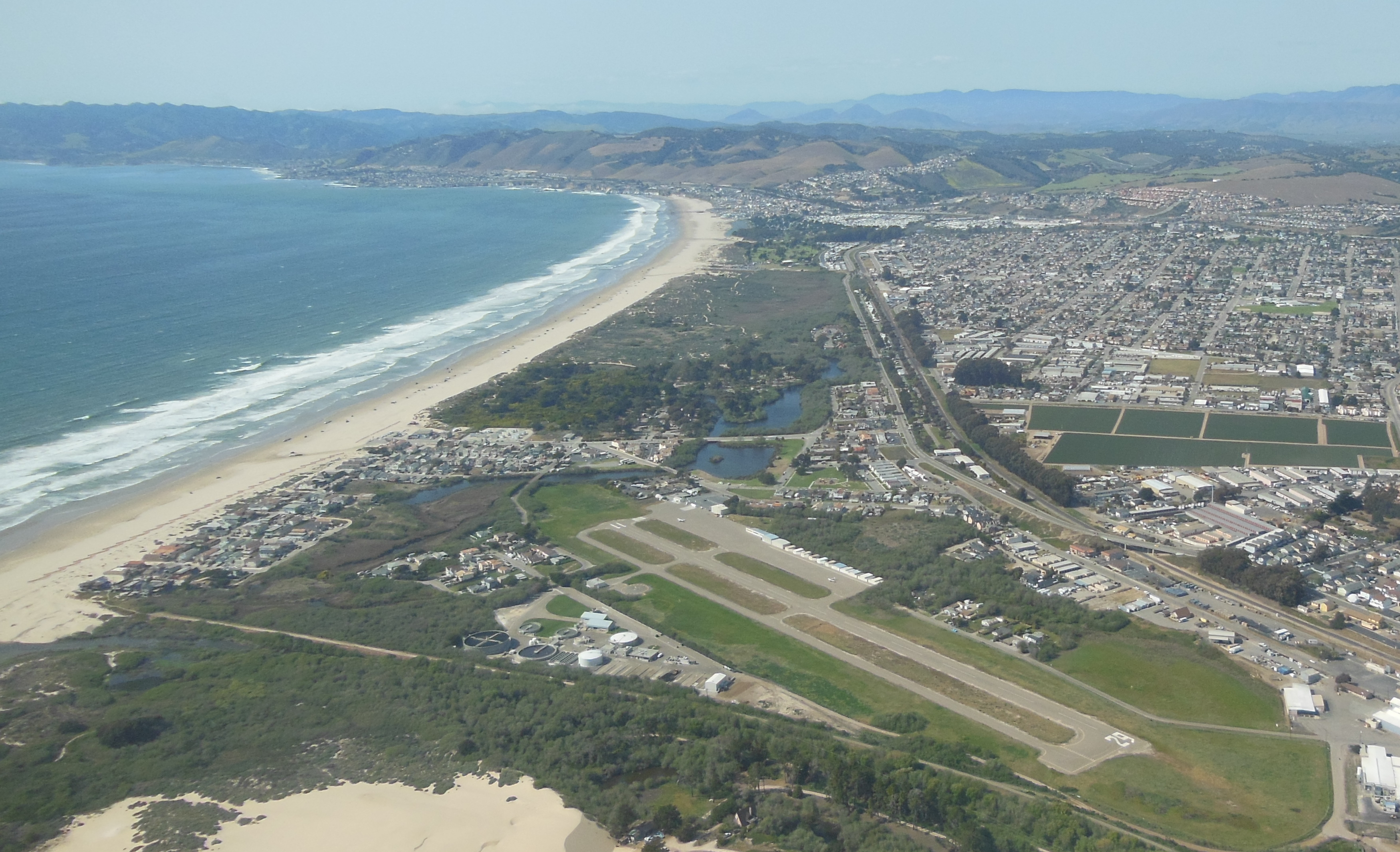
- 2013 aerial photo, facing north
- IATA: none; ICAO: none; FAA LID: L52

Summary
- Airport type: Public
- Operator: San Luis Obispo County
- Location: Oceano, California
- Elevation AMSL: 14 ft / 4.3 m
- Coordinates: 35°06′05″N 120°37′20″W
- Interactive map of Oceano County Airport

Runways
Direction	Length		Surface
Direction	ft	m	Surface
11/29	2,325	709	Asphalt

Oceano County Airport (FAA LID: L52) is a public airport located one mile (1.6 km) west of the central business district (CBD) of Oceano, in San Luis Obispo County, California, United States. The airport covers 58 acres (230,000 m^{2}), and has one runway and no control tower. It is mostly used for general aviation, and is walking distance to the sand dunes that line the beach at Oceano.
