= Vegan Action =

American nonprofit

- Certified Vegan logo
- Formation: 1995; 31 years ago
- Type: 501(c)(3) organization
- Tax ID no.: 94-3224024
- Purpose: Promoting veganism and vegan product certification
- Location: Richmond, Virginia, U.S.
- Executive Director: Kristine Vandenberg
- Website: vegan.org
- Formerly called: Vegan Awareness Foundation

Vegan Action, previously known as the Vegan Awareness Foundation, is a Virginia-based nonprofit organization founded in 1995. Its declared goal is to help animals, the environment, and human health by educating the public about the benefits of a vegan lifestyle and encourage the spread of vegan food options through public outreach campaigns. One of the goals of Vegan Action is to create growth in the vegan marketplace and increase the availability of vegan products. They administer a logo to certify vegan products, vegan food options into schools nationwide, and ideas behind veganism.

== Activities and campaigns ==
=== Vegan certification ===
Since 2000, Vegan Action administers a "Certified Vegan" logo, which is a registered trademark applied to foods, clothing, cosmetics and other items that contain no animal products and are not tested on animals. The logo is aimed at consumers interested in vegan products and helps vegans to shop without consulting ingredient lists. Since its introduction, the logo has been used by over 1000 companies on thousands of products.

=== McVegan ===
Each year, Vegan Action helps people worldwide organize McVegan events, which involve passing out thousands of free vegan food samples and dietary information to the public. In 1995, McDonald's threatened to sue Vegan Action for trademark infringement over McVegan shirts which featured McDonald's well-known golden arches with the logo "McVegan. Billions and billions saved." Instead of backing down, Vegan Action enlisted pro-bono services from an intellectual property legal firm and developed a defense based on the First Amendment's protection of parody. The story was picked up by the Los Angeles Times, San Francisco Examiner, Houston Chronicle, Chicago Tribune, the AP and UPI wires, National Public Radio, and four local television networks. After two weeks of widespread press, McDonald's backed down and formally withdrew their threat of legal action.

=== Dorm food ===
Vegan Action has worked to help dozens of campus groups across the country bring vegan food options into their dorms. Their dorm food campaigns have made college life more convenient for vegan students while introducing thousands of other students to the possibilities of a vegan diet. Vegan Action began after a successful petition in 1994 at UC-Berkeley. Working with two campus groups, Students in Support of Animals and The Coalition of Students for Healthy Dorm Food, the Vegan Action founders circulated a petition for improved vegan food options, obtaining signatures from 1,200 dorm residents. The groups then met with dorm administrators, armed with the Physicians Committee for Responsible Medicine's Gold Plan, which supplies vegan recipes and nutritional information to food-service personnel, and other supportive material.

== See also ==
- List of vegetarian and vegan organizations
- American Vegan Society
