= Hans Diehl =

American physician and Seventh-day Adventist

- Born: 1946
- Died: 2 August 2023 (aged 76–77); Loma Linda, California
- Occupations: Physician, writer

Hans Diehl (1946 – 2 August 2023) was an American nutritionist and Seventh-day Adventist, best known for his advocacy of lifestyle medicine and whole food plant-based nutrition. He was the founder of the Complete Health Improvement Program (CHIP).

== Biography ==
Diehl was born in Germany. He credited his early interest in healthy lifestyle to the Seventh-day Adventist Church. He was inspired by the research of Denis Burkitt and Nathan Pritikin who he had met and worked with. Diehl was a research and education director at the Pritikin Longevity Center. He was concerned that Pritikin's program was only available for those who could afford it so in 1988 he founded the Complete Health Improvement Program (CHIP), a comprehensive lifestyle intervention that advocates a whole-food plant-based diet and incorporates the importance of exercise, kindness and sleep. The CHIP program emphasizes a diet low in cholesterol, fat, oil, processed sugar and salt. It is abundant in fresh fruits and vegetables, legumes, whole grains with limited nuts and seeds. Diehl stated that CHIP is not "ideologically structured as a vegetarian or vegan program" but based on lifestyle changes. CHIP was later renamed Pivio Health.

Diehl obtained a Master of Public Health and Doctor of Health Science from Loma Linda University in 1975. He was a professor of preventative medicine at Loma Linda University School of Medicine. Diehl established the Lifestyle Medicine Institute in Loma Linda, California which enhanced knowledge of the role lifestyle plays in health. The Lifestyle Medicine Institute promotes The Optimal Diet, a whole-food plant-based diet that is described as "almost devoid of overly processed and refined products".

He was a speaker at the 35th World Vegetarian Congress in 2002. In 2015, Diehl was inducted in the North American Vegetarian Society's Vegan Hall of Fame. His books have been translated into 36 languages and over two million copies sold.

Diehl died from an AFib-related stroke at Loma Linda University Medical Center on 2 August 2023, aged 77.

== Personal life ==
Diehl was a lifelong Seventh-day Adventist. He became a lacto-ovo vegetarian in 1967. He adopted a whole-food plant-based diet in 1997. He was married to Lily Pan Diehl a pianist and singer, they had two children.

== Selected publications ==
- To Your Health: How to Eat More and Live Longer and Better (1987)
- Dynamic Living (with Aileen Ludington, 1995)
- Take Charge of Your Health (with Aileen Ludington, 2001)
- Dr. Diehl's CHIP Program for Reversing Disease with Fork and Knife (2003)
- Dynamic Health: A Simple Plan to Take Charge of Your Life (2003)
- The Optimal Diet: The Official Chip Cookbook (with Darlene Blaney, 2009)
- Health Power: Health by Choice Not Chance (2011)
