= Malaga, New Jersey =

Populated place in Gloucester County, New Jersey

- Census-designated place
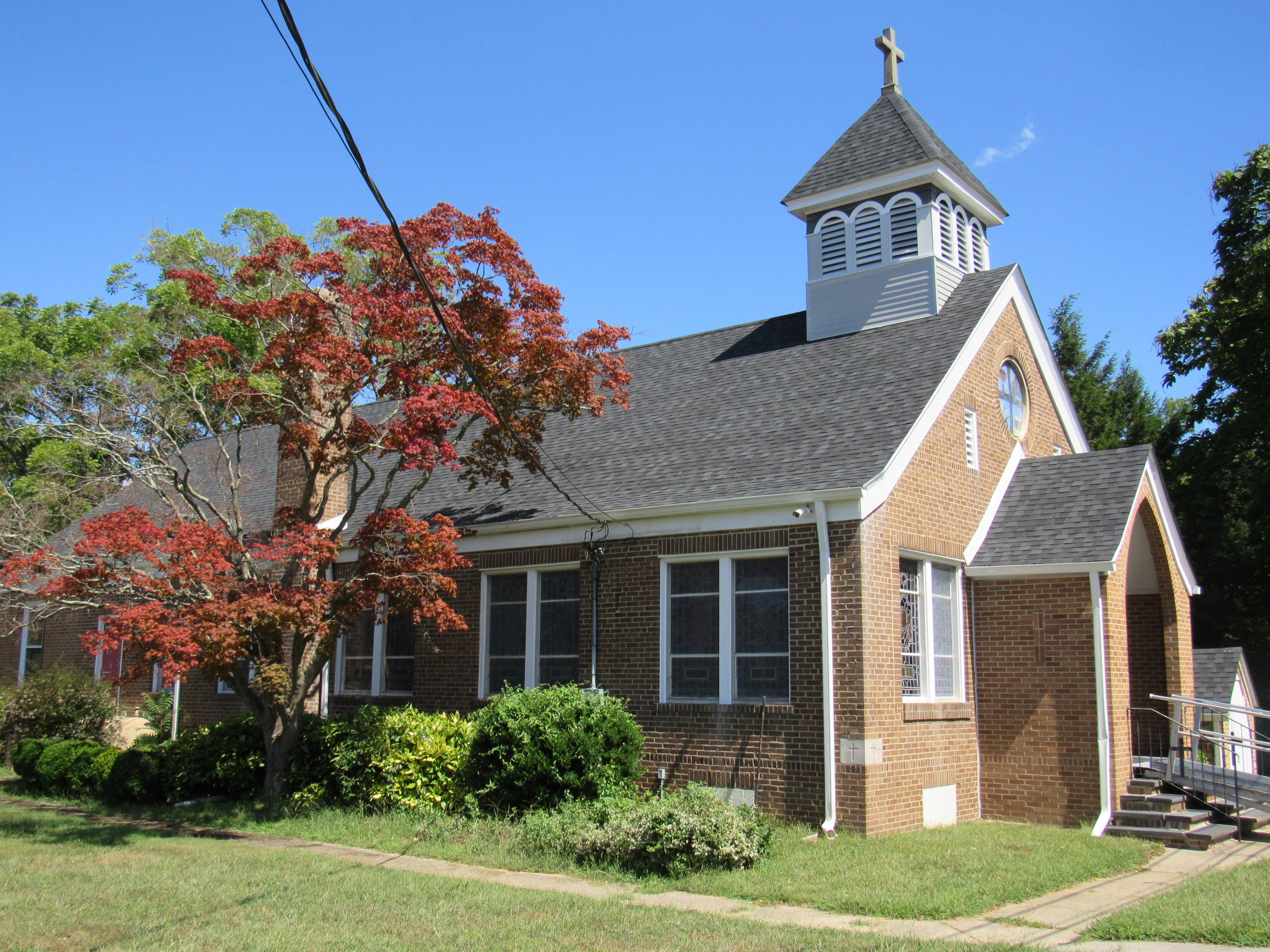
- St. Mary's Catholic Church

- Malaga's location in Gloucester County (Inset: Gloucester County in New Jersey) Malaga (New Jersey) Malaga (the United States)
- Coordinates: 39°34′11″N 75°02′52″W
- Country: United States
- State: New Jersey
- County: Gloucester
- Township: Franklin
- Named for: Málaga, Spain

Area
  - Total: 2.29 sq mi (5.93 km^{2})
  - Land: 2.14 sq mi (5.53 km^{2})
  - Water: 0.15 sq mi (0.40 km^{2})
- Elevation: 95 ft (29 m)

Population (2020)
  - Total: 1,475
  - Density: 690.4/sq mi (266.58/km^{2})
- ZIP Code: 08328
- GNIS feature ID: 0878042

Malaga (pronounced MA-la-ga) is an unincorporated community located within Franklin Township, in Gloucester County, in the U.S. state of New Jersey. The area is served as United States Postal Service ZIP Code 08328.

As of the 2020 census, Malaga had a population of 1,475.

U.S. Route 40, Route 47 and Route 55 all pass through the Malaga area.

The community was named after Málaga, in Spain.

== Demographics ==
Historical population
Census	Pop.	Note	%±
2020	1,475		—
U.S. Decennial Census; 2020

Malaga was first listed as a census designated place in the 2020 U.S. census.

Malaga CDP, New Jersey – Racial and ethnic composition Note: the US Census treats Hispanic/Latino as an ethnic category. This table excludes Latinos from the racial categories and assigns them to a separate category. Hispanics/Latinos may be of any race.
Race / Ethnicity (NH = Non-Hispanic)	Pop 2020	2020
White alone (NH)	1,174	79.59%
Black or African American alone (NH)	111	7.53%
Native American or Alaska Native alone (NH)	3	0.20%
Asian alone (NH)	20	1.36%
Native Hawaiian or Pacific Islander alone (NH)	0	0.00%
Other race alone (NH)	4	0.27%
Mixed race or Multiracial (NH)	48	3.25%
Hispanic or Latino (any race)	115	7.80%
Total	1,475	100.00%

As of 2020, the population was 1,475.

== Notable people ==
People who were born in, residents of, or otherwise closely associated with Malaga include:

- H. Jay Dinshah (1933–2000), founder and president of the American Vegan Society and editor of its publication, Ahimsa magazine
- Ed Keegan (1939–2014), MLB pitcher who played for the Philadelphia Phillies and Kansas City Athletics.
