= Rynn Berry =

American historian of vegetarianism

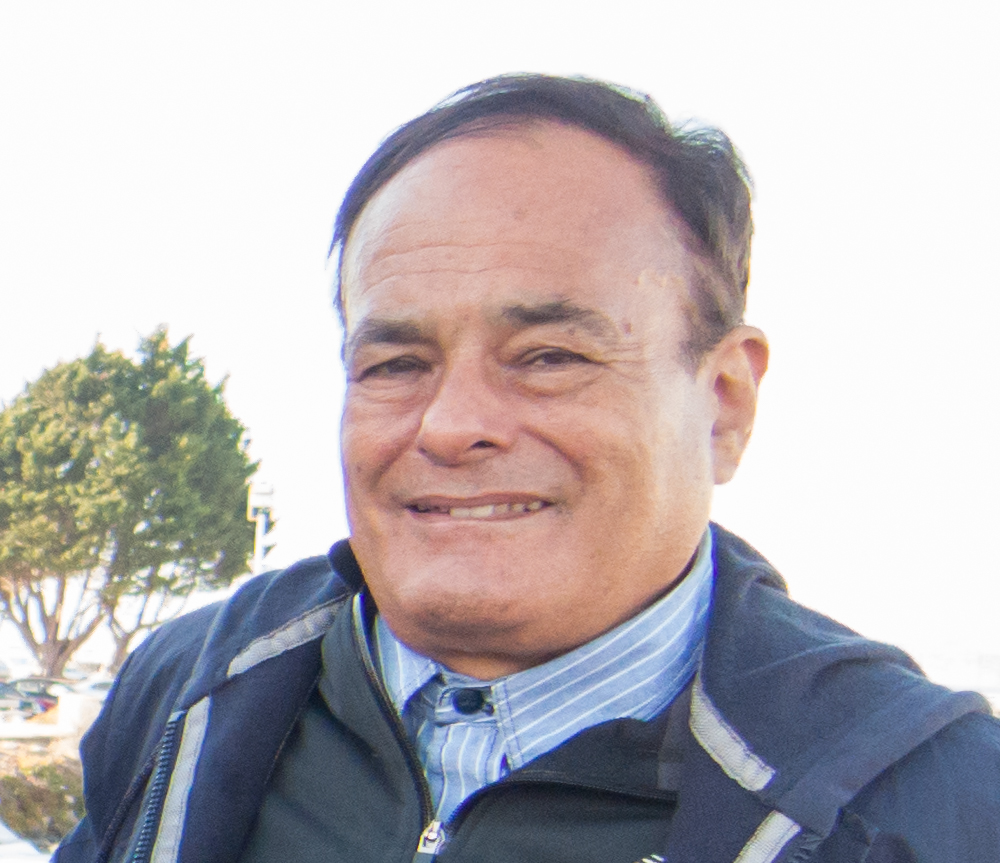
- Rynn Berry at the 2012 World Vegetarian Congress in San Francisco
- Born: January 31, 1945; Honolulu, Hawaii, US
- Died: January 9, 2014 (aged 68); New York Methodist Hospital, New York City, New York, US
- Education: University of Pennsylvania, Columbia University
- Occupations: Author, activist
- Writing career
- Genres: History and biography, short plays
- Subjects: Vegetarianism and veganism

Rynn Berry (January 31, 1945 – January 9, 2014) was an American author and scholar on vegetarianism and veganism, as well as a pioneer in the animal rights and vegan movements.

== Early life ==
Berry was born on January 31, 1945, in Honolulu, Hawaii, and grew up in Coconut Grove, Florida, where his mother and maternal siblings lived. He studied literature, archeology, and classics at the University of Pennsylvania, and ancient history and comparative religion at Columbia University.

He became vegetarian as a teenager and vegan at the age of 21. He became a rawfooder in 1994.

== Career ==
Berry taught comparative literature at Baruch College and later culinary history at New School for Social Research in New York City. He was a scholar of vegetarian history, and wrote a number of books, plays, and other works on this subject. Richard H. Schwartz, founder of Jewish Veg, called his fourth book, the 2004 work, Hitler: Neither Vegetarian Nor Animal Lover (with an introduction by Lantern Books's co-founder Martin Rowe) a "thoughtful and carefully documented book." A frequent international lecturer, Berry's books have been translated into many languages, and he was locally and internationally known in the vegan community.

Berry also wrote the entry on the history of vegetarianism in America for the Oxford Encyclopedia of American Food and Drink (2004), and seven entries for The Oxford Companion to Food and Drink in America (2007). He was also a playwright who contributed a number of short plays about 'famous vegetarians in history'. He wrote a chapter on the history of the raw food movement for Becoming Raw: The Essential Guide to Raw Vegan Diets.

He was also on the advisory boards of EarthSave, the American Vegetarian Association, and historical advisor to the North American Vegetarian Society. He was an honored member of the American Vegan Society Speakers Bureau, and an instructor at Victoria Moran's Main Street Academy. Berry also contributed to the animal rights movement in Brazil, where he frequently lectured both in English (with a translator) and in Portuguese.

=== Famous Vegetarians ===
One of Berry's most notable works, Famous Vegetarians and Their Favorite Recipes: Lives and Lore from Buddha to the Beatles, is a collection of biographical sketches of famous people who were vegetarians at some point in their lives. Each chapter also contains an illustration of each of the famous vegetarians profiled, followed by some of their favorite recipes. For the Leonardo da Vinci chapter, he translated for the first time into English recipes from De Honesta Voluptate by Bartolomeo Platina. The first edition of the book was published in 1989 by Panjandrum Books. In 1995, Pythagorean Publishers released a revised edition with three additional chapters covering Mahavira, Plato and Socrates, and Swami Prabhupada. A review published in Vegetarian Times, considered Famous Vegetarians "scholarship at the end of a fork – and for writing it, he deserves an 'A'." In Religious Vegetarianism: From Hesiod to the Dalai Lama, Kerry S. Walters and Lisa Portmess said that Berry's book is "a twentieth-century parallel" to Howard Williams's classic The Ethics of Diet. In his book The Vegetarian Revolution, Giorgio Cerquetti recommended "everybody to read Rynn Berry's excellent book."

== Death and legacy ==
Berry lived alone in an apartment in Prospect Heights. He was an enthusiastic amateur runner, despite having asthma.

He was found collapsed and unconscious in jogging clothes in Prospect Park in the Prospect Heights section of Brooklyn, New York, on December 31, 2013, but not identified until January 7, 2014. The only clues in his pockets were "keys and an asthma inhaler". He never regained consciousness and died at 12:30 pm on January 9, 2014.

Martin Rowe, author and co-founder of Lantern Books, commented on Berry's death:

"Rynn's impact was literally incalculable, given how many met him, bought his books, or talked with him at the Union Square green market over the many years. He was the epitome of the kind of unheralded grassroots activist without which any movement for change cannot grow, and he was a witty and erudite figure: the Dr. Johnson of the vegetarian movement. He would be missed greatly, even by those who never met him, but his work will live on."

Author Chef Fran Costigan wrote that Berry was "a gentle soul whose life touched so many."

His life was celebrated publicly and outdoors on March 30, 2014, for about thirty minutes, at the annual Veggie Pride Parade in New York City. On July 5, 2014, he was honored at the annual NAVS Vegetarian Summerfest in Johnstown, Pennsylvania, in a plenary led by vegan activist and author Victoria Moran. In previous years, Berry had been on the staff of Vegetarian Summerfest as a scholar and speaker on veganism and world religions.

“The Rynn Berry Jr. Papers” are housed in the North Carolina State University Libraries’ Special Collections and Research Center.

== Bibliography of published writings ==
- The Vegetarians, Autumn Press, 1979. ISBN 0-394-73633-8
- The New Vegetarians (updated edition of his previous book, with William Shurtleff interview instead of Marty Feldman's), Chestnut Ridge, New York, Townhouse Press, 1988 ISBN 0-940653-17-6; Pythagorean Publishers, 1993. ISBN 0-9626169-0-7
- Famous Vegetarians and Their Favorite Recipes: Lives and Lore from Buddha to the Beatles. Pythagorean Publishers. 1995. ISBN 0962616915.
- Food for the Gods: Vegetarianism & the World's Religions, Pythagorean Publishers, 1998. ISBN 0-9626169-2-3
- Hitler: Neither Vegetarian Nor Animal Lover (with an introduction by Martin Rowe) Pythagorean Publishers, 2004. ISBN 0-9626169-6-6
- "Veganism," article in The Oxford Companion to American Food and Drink, Oxford University Press, 2007, pp. 604–605.
- Becoming Raw: The Essential Guide to Raw Vegan Diets (with Brenda Davis & Vesanto Melina), Book Publishing Company, 2010. ISBN 1-57067-238-5
- The Vegan Guide to New York City (with Chris A. Suzuki & Barry Litsky), Ethical Living, 2013 (20th edition). ISBN 0-9788132-8-6

== See also ==
- List of vegetarians
