= Victoria Moran =

American author and speaker (born 1950)

- Born: March 21, 1950 (age 75)
- Occupations: Author, speaker & radio host
- Years active: 1975-present
- Organization: Main Street Vegan
- Known for: Veganism, spirituality
- Spouse(s): Patrick Moran (1977-1987 (his death)); William Melton (1997-)
- Children: Rachael Adair
- Website: MainStreetVegan.net

Victoria Moran is an American author and speaker. She has written a number of books specializing in both spirituality and veganism. Moran hosts the "Main Street Vegan" radio show and podcast on Unity Online Radio.

She started her career as a freelance magazine writer and has gone on to publish a number of best-selling vegan books, starting in 1985 with Compassion the Ultimate Ethic, which was based on her undergraduate college thesis. Her 2012 book, Main Street Vegan, is the basis of her company and outreach, including the Main Street Vegan podcast, Main Street Vegan Academy, and Main Street Vegan Productions. Her work in the field of veganism led her to win the Vegan of The Year award in 2012; her podcast won a Vegan Media Outlet Award in 2015.

Her most recent book was published in 2015 and is titled The Good Karma Diet.

== Career ==
Moran began writing for music and fan magazines as a teenager in the 1960s. After moving from her hometown of Kansas City, Missouri, to London in 1968 to attend the Lucie Clayton School of Fashion, she went vegetarian and began to do freelance writing in this field. Following her studies in London, Moran attended North Central College, Naperville, Illinois, majoring in religious studies in her late twenties. She earned a Richter Fellowship for Foreign Study and traveled to the United Kingdom in the early 1980s to research the paper that would become her first book, Compassion the Ultimate Ethic. This book was published in England, before going out of print. It was then picked up by the American Vegan Society, which continues to offer the title. The book drew information from interviews with British vegans and answered a number of common questions about veganism.

After meeting Patti Breitman at a vegan conference in 1989, Moran released a weight loss book called The Love-Powered Diet in 1991. An excerpt from the book discusses Moran's own quest to stop her compulsive eating with the help of a Twelve Step recovery program. Moran speaks about the physiological and spiritual aspects of eating issues that are often missed and combines the spiritual turnaround of the Twelve Steps with a vegan lifestyle. The book at the time was seen as a unique take on food issues and Moran received accolades for her approach. This book had a new life under the title Love Yourself Thin, which was published in 1997. It went back into print in 2009 under the original title, The Love-Powered Diet.

Her next book was Get the Fat Out, which was published by Harmony Books in 1994. She branched out into the self-help/spirituality arena with 1997's Shelter for the Spirit: Create Your Own Haven in a Hectic World. She featured on Oprah Winfrey's show in 1999, in a segment called "Remembering your Spirit", where she discussed the book.

Earlier that year, Moran's fifth book, Creating a Charmed Life, had been published by HarperCollins. This is a self-help book, predominantly offering advice to busy women. Like many of her books, Creating a Charmed Life also focuses on spirituality. Creating a Charmed Life went on to become a bestseller, Moran's biggest selling book to date.

Moran continued to publish in the fields of self-help and spirituality with her next book, Lit From Within, which was released in 2001. It is an exploration of beauty from the inside out and Moran appeared on The Oprah Winfrey Show with this book at that time. In 2002 came the bestselling Fit from Within: 101 Simple Ways to Change Your Body and Your Life. The book contains tips for improving one's relationship with food, based on Moran's experience of making peace in this area and maintaining a long-term weight loss.

In 2004, Younger by the Day was published by HarperOne. The book continued to focus on self-help and spirituality, with the core focus of the book to help women age with genuine grace, terrific health, and a buoyant spirit. In the synopsis, she asked the question, why do some women blossom with age while others wither? The question summarizes the book's overall approach. In 2007, HarperOne released the book titled Fat, Broke & Lonely No More. The book focuses on healthy dealings with food, money, and romantic connections.

In 2009, HarperOne published Living a Charmed Life, a tenth-anniversary sequel to the successful Creating a Charmed Life, an entirely new book.

Main Street Vegan came in April 2012 from TarcherPenguin, and is Moran's eleventh book. Well-known vegan Moby commented that the book was, "a great book for anyone who’s curious about veganism." The book is also endorsed by filmmaker, Michael Moore. VegNews called the book "the vegan Bible, New Testament" and rated is as one of the Top 12 Vegan Books of 2012.

In June of that year, Moran, who had hosted the program, “Your Charmed Life,” on the Martha Stewart Channel of Sirius Satellite Radio in 2006, became the co-host with her daughter, Adair, of the show Main Street Vegan on Unity.FM, the radio arm of the Unity churches. Adair, co-author of Main Street Vegan, resigned from the show after the first few months, and Victoria has stayed on as the solo host. The weekly radio show has an hour runtime and is devoted to every aspect of vegan living. Moran regularly interviews vegan authors, activists, physicians, celebrities, and chefs. 2012 was also the inauguration year of Main Street Vegan Academy, Moran's program to train and certify Vegan Lifestyle Coaches and Educators. The program is located in New York City.

During the same year, she received one of her major accolades, winning the female Vegan of The Year award. The award was presented by Vegans Are Cool, with Dr. Michael Greger finishing as the male winner of the award. TarcherPenguin published Moran's latest book in 2015, The Good Karma Diet: Dine Gently, Feel Amazing, Age in Slow Motion. This book reveals that by aligning your eating with your ethics, you will not only eat a healthier diet but also feel better about yourself. This is two-prong look at “good karma dining,” focusing on both going vegan and emphasizing a “high-green, high-raw, high-energy” lifestyle.

== Personal life & family ==
Moran was born in Kansas City, Missouri, in 1950. She was baptized Roman Catholic but was introduced as a young child to the teachings of the Unity Church by her nanny and “first guru,” Adelene DeSoto. She married Patrick Moran in 1977 and their daughter, Rachael Adair, was born in 1983. Patrick died in 1987. Her daughter Adair is a lifelong vegan, an aerialist, stunt performer, actor, and playwright, as well as an NY licensed wildlife rehabilitator and co-founder of Urban Utopia Wildlife in New York City. Victoria married William Melton in 1997, and together they wrote the script for Miss Liberty, a family feature film in pre-production about a cow who escapes from a slaughterhouse.

Victoria started her vegetarian journey in 1969, sparked by an interest in yoga that began in 1967. She was able to move seriously toward veganism in 1983 after experiencing sufficient recovery from her own compulsive eating to be able to make that choice. Her primary motivation for being vegan is ethical: the desire to mitigate the suffering of animals. She lives in New York City with her husband and their rescue dog, Forbes. She writes in cafes where she indulges her passion for tea; practices her hobby of aerial yoga, and is active in animal rights and vegan events in the NYC area.
