= Vesanto Melina =

Canadian dietitian

- Born: 13 March 1942 (age 84); Vancouver, Canada
- Occupations: Dietitian, author, speaker
- Website: https://nutrispeak.com

Vesanto Melina (born 13 March 1942) is a Canadian Registered Dietitian and co-author of several books on vegetarian, vegan, and raw food nutrition, have sold over a million copies in English and almost a million in six additional languages (Italian, Dutch, Traditional Chinese, Czech, French, and Portuguese), most with co-author Brenda Davis. She has presented talks and workshops on various aspects of vegetarian, vegan and raw foods and nutrition for dietitians, health professionals, and vegetarian associations in 17 American states and 9 Canadian provinces, and in 10 countries (in Europe-Paris, Copenhagen, Aarhus, Dresden, Ghent, Barcelona, Oxford, London, Edinburgh, Glasgow, Venice) as well as Iceland and Costa Rica.

== Early life ==
Melina was born on March 13, 1942, in Vancouver, British Columbia, with the given name Louise Elizabeth Goranson. Her parents were also both born in British Columbia. Her father was physiologist Ed Goranson, who specialized in diabetes working in the Toronto lab of Sir Frederick Banting and Charles Best. Banting and Best received a Nobel Prize for the discovery of insulin. Dr. Goranson taught physiology at the University of Toronto and the University of British Columbia, and did cancer research at Princess Margaret Hospital and at Mill Hill in London, England. Her mother was teacher Margaret Goranson (née Humble) who taught at the University of British Columbia's Child Study Centre. Vesanto's sisters are Toronto actress ≈Linda Goranson and stuntwoman Leslie Goranson, who was Annie Oakley in Disneyland Paris's "Buffalo Bill's Wild West Show" and is the mother of French stuntman Marco Luraschi. Melina studied nutrition at the University of London, England, and the University of Toronto, Ontario (1960–1964) and completed a master's degree in Nutrition at the University of Toronto, Ontario (1964–1965). She married her childhood sweetheart, mathematician John Crawford, in 1964, and they had two children. The couple divorced in 1973. She spent four years at an ashram in Poona, India, between 1978 and 1981, changing her first name to Vesanto and traveled to Nepal several times before returning to British Columbia. She was married to the late David Melina from August 1994 to 2000. She has a son, daughter, and two grandsons. Since 2005, Vesanto's partner has been Cam Doré, who was executive director of The HOME Society in Abbotsford BC. She has lived at WindSong cohousing community in Langley, British Columbia, and since 2016, she and Cam Doré live at Vancouver Cohousing.

== Career ==
Melina taught nutrition at the University of British Columbia from 1965 to 1968 and did research with Dr. Thomas L. Perry on the inborn error of metabolism homocystinuria. She taught nutrition at the University of British Columbia in 1973–74. Between 1975 and 1978, she was a nutritionist with the health department of the government of British Columbia in Kelowna. Between 1978 and 1981 she lived in India and Nepal; becoming vegetarian in 1978 and becoming vegan in 1993. A motivation for her dietary choices was learning about the cruelty involved in the factory farming of animals, including boar-bashing of pigs (hitting them on the snout with a baseball bat or iron bar to force them into transport trucks), the debeaking of chickens, and the dragging off transport trucks of "downer" cows and calves. She returned to teach nutrition at the University of British Columbia, at Vancouver's Langara College and at Seattle's Bastyr University. She became increasingly interested in the topic of vegetarian nutrition and foods. She began teaching popular classes in vegetarian cooking and nutrition that received national media attention (CBC National News, Maclean's magazine). She received the Clintec award for leadership in dietetics. Melina was co-author of the American Dietetic Association's (ADA's) and Dietitians of Canada's joint 2003 Position Paper on Vegetarian Diets. She is a member of Dietitians of Canada, College of Health and Care Professionals of British Columbia, the Academy of Nutrition and Dietetics (formerly the American Dietetic Association), the Washington State Dietetics Association, and the International Vegetarian Union. She has designed and presents continuing education courses for health professionals for the Academy of Nutrition and Dietetics and is the lead author of their 2016 position Paper on Vegetarian Diets. In 2023 after doing a book tour to Philadelphia, New York and New Jersey, she received a lifetime achievement award at the Plant-based Prevention of Disease Lifestyle Medicine Conference.

== Books by Vesanto Melina ==
Her most recent books, Plant Powered Seniors (with dietitian Brenda Davis and Dr Charlyn Black), and Plant Powered Protein (with co-authors Brenda and Cory Davis) became category bestsellers on Amazon. Her other books are listed at https://nutrispeak.com/books/.

Her "Becoming Vegan: Comprehensive and Express Editions" with Registered Dietitian Brenda Davis received star rating by the American Library Association as "the go-to book" on vegan nutrition, won a 2014 Canada Book Award and received an honorable mention for ForeWord Book of the Year award in the U.S. (Health). Melina is a speaker, consultant, and media personality.

== Books ==
- Plant Powered Seniors by Brenda Davis, Vesanto Melina, and Dr. Charlyn Black (Health Communications, Inc, 2026.
- Plant Powered Protein by Brenda Davis, Vesanto Melina, and Cory Davis (The Book Publishing Company, 2023.)
- The Kick Diabetes Cookbook by Brenda Davis and Vesanto Melina (The Book Publishing Company 2018.)
- Becoming Vegan: Comprehensive Edition by Brenda Davis and Vesanto Melina (The Book Publishing Company 2014)
- Earlier books (with co-authors) are: Becoming Vegan: Express Edition (2013), Cooking Vegan (2012), Becoming Raw (2010), Cooking Vegetarian (1996,1998; 2011, 2013), Healthy Eating for Life to Prevent and Treat Cancer (2002), Raising Vegetarian Children (2003), Food Allergy Survival Guide (2004),The Raw Food Revolution Diet (2008) The New Becoming Vegetarian (2003), Becoming Vegan (2000), Becoming Vegetarian 1994, 1995, 2003 and 2013 )

== Peer Reviewed Scientific Papers ==
1. Melina V. Plant Powered Protein: For People and the Planet. Proceeding Summaries of the 15th Conference of the Plant-based Prevention Of Disease Nonprofit. 2024; 6(1):18 https://ijdrp.org/

2. Melina V. Five Decades: From Challenge to Acclaim. Can J Diet Pract Res . 2016 Sep;77(3):154-8. https://dcjournal.ca/doi/full/10.3148/cjdpr-2016-015.

3. Melina V, Craig W, Levin S. Position of the Academy of Nutrition and Dietetics: Vegetarian Diets. J Acad Nutr Diet. 2016 Dec;116(12):1970-1980. https://pubmed.ncbi.nlm.nih.gov/27886704/

4. American Dietetic Association; Dietitians of Canada. Position of the American Dietetic Association and Dietitians of Canada: Vegetarian diets. J Am Diet Assoc. 2003 Jun;103(6):748-65. https://pubmed.ncbi.nlm.nih.gov/12778049/

5. Messina V, Melina V, Mangels AR. A new food guide for North American vegetarians. J Am Diet Assoc. 2003;103(6):771.

6. Messina V, Melina V, Mangels AR. A new food guide for North American vegetarians. Can J Diet Pract Res. 2003;64(2):82.

7. American Dietetic Association and Dietitians of Canada. Vegetarian chapter in The Manual of Clinical Dietetics. 6th edition, 2000.

- Note: Name changed from Crawford to Melina (due to marriage).

8. Crawford. VL Nutrition for the Adult Vegetarian in The Manual of Nutritional Care, British Columbia Dietitians' and Nutritionists' Association, 4th edition, 1992. (Endorsed by the British Columbia Medical Association.)

9. Crawford VL. Eating Your Way to a Healthy Lifestyle. Nursing B.C. 1992;24(5):16.

10. Crawford. VL. Vegetarian Diets. Update. Newsletter of the B.C.Nutrition Council. 1986;11(1):1.

11. Crawford VL. Nutrition and Hyperactivity in Children. Ministry of Health, Province of B.C, 1980.

12. Crawford. VL. Food for Little Folks. Ministry of Health, Province of B.C. 1979.

13. Crawford. VL Junk Food in Our Schools? A look at student spending. Journal of the Canadian Dietetic Association. 1977;38(3)193.

14. Davis MA, Crawford. VL, Lee M, Birbeck J. Low Methionine Recipes. Division of Human Nutrition, University of British Columbia. B.C. 1969

15. Perry, T. L. et al. "Treatment of Homocystinuria with a Low Methionine Diet, Supplemental Cystine and a Methyl Donor". The Lancet ii: 474, August 31, 1968.
