= Freya Dinshah =

Author and president of the American Vegan Society

Freya Smith Dinshah
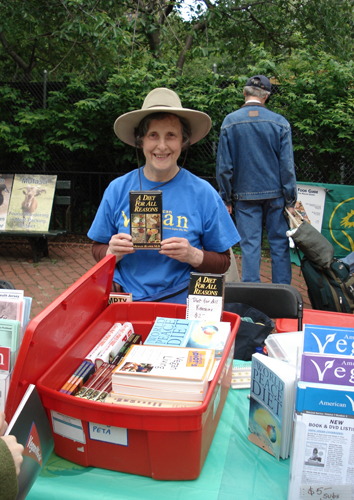
- Freya Dinshah at an exhibit table at the Veggie Pride Parade, New York City in 2008
- Born: Freya Frances Vera Smith; September 24, 1941; Ewell, Surrey, England, U.K.
- Occupation: Advocacy
- Spouse: Jay Dinshah (1960–2000)
- Children: 2
- Writing career
- Genre: Cookbook
- Subjects: Veganism, ahimsa
- Notable works: The Vegan Kitchen, 1965, 1987 (13 editions); Feeding vegan babies; XXIII World Vegetarian Congress Cook Book, 1975
- Notable awards: Vegetarian Hall of Fame, 1990
- Website: www.americanvegan.org

Freya Smith Dinshah (born September 24, 1941) is an Anglo-American veganism activist and writer. She is the author of The Vegan Kitchen, president of the American Vegan Society in Malaga, New Jersey, and editor of American Vegan magazine (formerly Ahimsa).

== Early life ==
Freya Frances Vera Smith was born in Epsom, England in 1941 to Grace Smith, who was active in The Vegan Society. There, she attended the Rosebery School for Girls. Dinshah has cited Frey Ellis as an influence on her parents and sister who became vegan.

== Professional career ==
Dinshah cofounded the Epsom Animal's Friends and Epsom Youth Campaign for Nuclear Disarmament groups. Dinshah and her husband formed the American Vegan Society in 1960.

In 1961, Dinshah and her husband participated in the American Natural Hygiene Society Convention, held in Chicago. The following year she and her husband moved the American Vegan Society from New Jersey to California. Her The Vegan Kitchen (1965) was, according to food historian Karen Page, the first American book to use the word "vegan."

In 1974, Dinshah along with Jay Dinshah, Helen Nearing, Scott Nearing and others founded the North American Vegetarian Society in order to host the 23rd World Vegetarian Congress in Orono, Maine in 1975.

Dinshah organized the vegan food for 1500 attendees at the World Vegetarian Congress, where her husband Jay Dinshah was elected president. She was in charge of catering and authored a vegan (then termed ‘total-vegetarian’) cookbook for the event. All food for the Congress was all-vegan, as is the base for many vegetarian and vegan conferences today, but in 1975, foodservice had separate, clearly-marked, small containers of milk and cheese for those who insisted on having them.

In 2020, the Portland Press Herald printed a report about the history of the 1975 event and said Dinshah's use of fresh food at the event was unusual for the time: "In addition to being fresh and seasonal, the food at the congress was very simple with little seasoning in order to accommodate the needs of all the various vegetarians in attendance, some of whom eschewed salt, sugar, white flour or spices."

In 1990, along with her husband, she was the first inductee in the North American Vegetarian Society's Vegetarian Hall of Fame.

After her husband died in 2000, Dinshah assumed leadership of American Vegan Society and became its president. She edits American Vegan (formerly Ahimsa) magazine. She has been a frequent speaker at vegan and vegetarian conferences.

== Publications ==
- The Vegan Kitchen (Malaga, N.J.: American Vegan Society, 1987)
- Apples, Bean Dip, and Carrot Cake: Kids! Teach Yourself to Cook, with Anne Dinshah
- Feeding vegan babies. pamphlet #23-01
- XXIII World Vegetarian Congress Cook Book (1975)

== Honors and awards ==
- 1990: Induction, Vegetarian Hall of Fame, now 'Vegan Hall of Fame' (North American Vegetarian Society)
- 2003: 24 Carrot Award, to Freya Dinshah and the American Vegan Society

== Personal life ==
In England, in February 1960, then Freya Smith of the UK met Jay Dinshah, who by 1957 had also become a vegan and who had founded the American Vegan Society in 1960.. She married him in August of that year. The couple had two children. She was widowed in 2000.
