= H. Jay Dinshah =

American proponent of veganism and Jain ethics (1933–2000)

Hom Jay Dinshah
- H. Jay Dinshah in 1964
- Born: November 2, 1933; Malaga, New Jersey, US
- Died: June 8, 2000 (aged 66); Malaga, New Jersey, US
- Occupations: Vegan advocate, social reformer
- Spouse: Freya Smith Dinshah
- Children: 2
- Relatives: Dinshah P. Ghadiali (father)
- Writing career
- Period: 20th century
- Genres: Philosophical, spiritual, vegan advocacy, social reform
- Subjects: Veganism, ahimsa
- Notable works: Out of the Jungle, 1967, 1995; Here's Harmlessness, 1964, 1993 - (an anthology edited by Jay Dinshah); Health Can be Harmless; Song of India; Numerous magazine articles (>250) and other writings
- Notable awards: Vegetarian Hall of Fame
- Movement: Vegan movement

Hom Jay Dinshah (November 2, 1933 – June 8, 2000) was an American veganism activist and natural hygiene proponent who was the founder and president of the American Vegan Society and the editor of its publication the Ahimsa magazine (1960–2000).

== Life ==
H. Jay Dinshah was born in the Malaga section of Franklin Township, Gloucester County, New Jersey, United States, where he lived his entire life. His father was a US citizen of Parsi ancestry who was born in India, and his mother was a US citizen of German ancestry. A lifelong vegetarian, Dinshah became vegan in 1957. He and his younger brother Noshervan—then aged 23 and 20 respectively—visited a Philadelphia slaughterhouse in 1957, after which he vowed to "work every day until all the slaughterhouses are closed!" He married the English-born Freya Smith in 1960. They had two children, Daniel Dinshah and author and athlete Anne Dinshah.

In 2000, Dinshah died of a heart attack at age 66, after a life of promoting veganism and the ethic of ahimsa, dynamic harmlessness. The International Vegetarian Union (IVU) memorialized Dinshah in their IVU News issue of October 2000. That same year, he was posthumously awarded the Mankar Memorial Award during the 2000 World Vegetarian Congress, held in Toronto, Ontario, Canada.

== Vegan activism ==
Dinshah founded the American Vegan Society early in 1960, and later that year (August) married the English-born Freya Smith. Freya, whose parents were active in The Vegan Society (of Great Britain), contributed to the early growth of the American Vegan Society and was until her retirement the president of the American Vegan Society. The American Vegan Society is headquartered at Malaga, New Jersey, on a parcel of land which is called "SunCrest", or "the SunCrest Educreational Center". During Dinshah's life, the American Vegan Society was characterized by vegan publishing and outreach, annual vegan conferences, vegan archiving, spiritual inspiration, providing people with an experience of vegan living, vegan food-preparation demonstrations, maintenance of a small veganic garden, and extensive networking. Dinshah served the American Vegan Society as its president and as the editor of its publication, Ahimsa magazine (1960–2000).

As a teenager, Dinshah was a motivational speaker, following the example of his father, who promoted vegetarianism along with color therapy. Throughout his life, Dinshah continued to lecture and to organize conferences advocating "positive veganism" as "dynamic harmlessness" ("Ahimsa" is derived from a Sanskrit term meaning "non-harming").

Dinshah's lectures, organized by American Vegan Society, included: 1961 "Coast to Coast Crusade" for Veganism across North America; 1965 "North Atlantic Lecture Tour" in Iceland, Britain, Europe; 1967-1968 "Round the World" Lecture Tour including four months of lectures in India.

Through these efforts, Dinshah lectured to general audiences in 19 different nations, on five continents, about veganism and ahimsa. Although Dinshah would lecture in English, local multilingual vegetarians interpreted his talks for each audience. Some videos of Jay's lectures from the 1980s and 1990s are archived and can be viewed on the YouTube channel Powerful Vegan Messages.

Crediting the wisdom of Mahatma Gandhi and Albert Schweitzer, Dinshah created and promoted the Pillars of Ahimsa, one for each letter of the word: A-H-I-M-S-A. Dinshah explained each in his book Out of the Jungle.

- A-Abstinence from Animal Products;
- H-Harmlessness with Reverence for Life (from Schweitzer);
- I-Integrity of Thought, Word, and Deed;
- M-Mastery over Oneself (against greed, envy, and materialism; instead focus on enlightenment);
- S-Service to Humanity, Nature, and Creation (3 main draws to veganism: health, environment, and animals; devotion to improving the world);
- A-Advancement of Understanding and Truth (applying Gandhian principles of Truth)

Dinshah was co-organizer of the 23rd World Vegetarian Congress in 1975, which was held in Orono, Maine, sponsored by the International Vegetarian Union (IVU), and hosted by the North American Vegetarian Society (NAVS), which continental organization he and other vegetarians founded to organize this international conference. During conference planning, the ad hoc committee decided to found the North American Vegetarian Society and asked Dinshah to serve as its first president.

Dinshah's birthday, November 2, has been designated as Dynamic Harmlessness Day and is the day following World Vegan Day (November 1).

== Natural hygiene ==
Dinshah was an advocate of orthopathy (natural hygiene). He was a board member of the American Natural Hygiene Society and corresponded with Herbert M. Shelton. In 1961, Dinshah attended the American Natural Hygiene Society's Convention in Chicago which featured a display of vegan clothing.

== Positions held ==
- International Vegetarian Union (IVU), Executive Vice-President
- The Vegan Society (England), Vice-President
- American Vegan Society (AVS), Founder, President, 1960-2000
- North American Vegetarian Society (NAVS), Cofounder and President, 1974–1979
- American Natural Hygiene Society (ANHS), Acting Executive Director, 1983
- Vegetarian Union of North America (VUNA), first President, 1987–1989
- Better Eating Coalition (various vegetarian and vegan groups) - late 1990s (under leadership of Dr. Richard Schwartz).

== Honors and awards ==
- Induction, Vegetarian Hall of Fame (North American Vegetarian Society)

== Publications ==
- Powerful Vegan Messages, 2014 posthumously coauthored with his daughter Anne Dinshah
- Here's Harmlessness, 1964, 1968, 1970, 1973, 1993 (an anthology edited by Jay Dinshah)
- Out of the Jungle, 1967, 1968, 1970, 1975 (Schweitzer Centennial Edition), 1995
- Health Can Be Harmless, 1968, 1987
- Song of India, 1973
- Numerous (>250) magazine articles and other writings
