= Jonathan Kauffman =

American journalist

- Born: 1971; Elkhart, Indiana
- Education: Macalester College
- Occupation: Food writer
- Writing career
- Genre: Food writing
- Notable works: Hippie Food: How Back-To-The-Landers, Longhairs, and Revolutionaries Changed the Way We Eat (2018)
- Website: jonathankauffman.com

Jonathan Kauffman (born 1971) is an American food writer who has written for Bon Appétit, The Wall Street Journal, The New York Times, Hazlitt, Los Angeles Times, San Francisco (magazine), Eater, Men's Health, Wine & Spirits, and Lucky Peach.

His first book, Hippie Food: How Back-to-the-Landers, Longhairs, and Revolutionaries Changed the Way We Eat, (2018) is a James Beard Foundation Award nominee, a 2022 Art of Eating nominee, and was listed as one of the best food books of 2018 by The New Yorker and Smithsonian (magazine).

== Early life and education ==
Kauffman was born in Elkhart, Indiana. He grew up there in a "politically liberal, socially conscious Mennonite family," who lived on a diet of "hippie food," and joined a Food co-op in 1975. While a student at Macalester College, Kauffman worked in restaurants as a dishwasher and a line-cook. He graduated in 1993.

== Career ==
Kauffman has worked as a food writer and professional cook. He has been a restaurant critic for the Seattle Times, a staff writer for the East Bay Express, a food blogger for the SF Weekly, and a food reporter for The San Francisco Chronicle.

=== Hippie Food ===
Kauffman's exposure to "hippie food" as a child made him wonder "why foods like brown rice, tofu, whole-wheat bread and granola were embraced by his community and counterculture communities." He conducted research for five years while working as a reporter at The San Francisco Chronicle, finally publishing Hippie Food: How Back-to-the-Landers, Longhairs, and Revolutionaries Changed the Way We Eat in 2018. This book explores how the natural foods movement within the American counterculture of the 1970s "changed the way we grow our food and how we think about purchasing and consuming it." Michael Pollan in a NYT Book Review, notes that in order to write the book, Kauffman "interviewed many in the cast of hippie farmers, cooks, communards and food artisans who together forged what Kauffman asks us to regard as a new and 'unique, self-contained cuisine.' ”

Hippie Food was nominated for a James Beard Foundation Award and an Art of Eating award. It was also listed as one of the best food books of 2018 by The New Yorker and Smithsonian Magazine.

== Honors and awards ==
- 2022: Hippie Food: How Back-to-the-Landers, Longhairs, and Revolutionaries Changed the Way We Eat: The 2022 Art of Eating Prize Longlist (Nominee)
- 2021:Best American Food Writing 2021: "Get Fat, Don't Die': Cooking and AIDS."
- 2018:Hippie Food: How Back-to-the-Landers, Longhairs, and Revolutionaries Changed the Way We Eat: The New Yorker Best Food Books of 2018
- 2018: Hippie Food: How Back-to-the-Landers, Longhairs, and Revolutionaries Changed the Way We Eat: Smithsonian (magazine) The Ten Best Books About Food of 2018
- 2011: SF Weekly, Best Food Writing 2011, "Shark's Fin."
- 2009: "What I Saw, and Ate, at the Pig ‘Sacrifice" - IACP Awards, Bert Greene Journalism Award (Internet, Seattle Weekly)

=== James Beard awards and nominations ===
Kauffman is the recipient of two James Beard Foundation Awards, and has received two additional nominations.

Winner:

- 2006: "Endangered Species," East Bay Express - (Newspaper or Magazine Reporting on Nutrition or Food-Related Consumer Issues)
- 2019: "Many Chinas, Many Tables," San Francisco Chronicle - (Journalism Awards, Dining and Travel)

Nominations:

- 2019: Hippie Food: How Back-to-the-Landers, Longhairs, and Revolutionaries Changed the Way We Eat (William Morrow) - Writing
- 2019: "You died': The Resurrection of a Cook in the Heart of SF's Demanding Culinary Scene" (San Francisco Chronicle) - Journalism

== Book ==
- Kauffman, Jonathan (2018). Hippie Food: How Back-To-The-Landers, Longhairs, and Revolutionaries Changed the Way We Eat. William Morrow. p. 352. ISBN 978-0062437303.
