= American Vegan Society =

American nonprofit organization

- Logo of the American Vegan Society
- Abbreviation: AVS
- Predecessor: Vegan Society (still active)
- Formation: 1960; 66 years ago
- Founder: H. Jay Dinshah
- Founded at: Malaga, New Jersey
- Type: Nonprofit
- Registration no.: EIN 226058533
- Legal status: 501(c)(3) organization
- Headquarters: 56 Dinshah Drive, Malaga, New Jersey
- Coordinates: 39.5681°N 75.0474°W
- Region served: United States
- Official language: English
- President: Freya Dinshah
- Key people: Anne Dinshah; Sarah Filippi-Field; Vance Lehmkuhl
- Main organ: American Vegan (formerly Ahimsa)
- Website: americanvegan.org

The American Vegan Society (AVS) is a New Jersey–based nonprofit organization that promotes veganism in the United States. It was founded in 1960 by H. Jay Dinshah.

== Activities ==
The organization publishes American Vegan quarterly magazine, which is sent to members of the society (earlier issues are published on the website), and books about veganism (since 1964). The organization educates about a vegan diet. It sponsors Dynamic Harmlessness Day annually on November 2, the birthday of the late H. Jay Dinshah, cofounder of the American Vegan Society. It has two YouTube channels, "Powerful Vegan Messages" and "American Vegan Society". It administers the AVS Speakers Bureau (18 popular vegan speakers from throughout the United States) and vegan conferences (the first annual event was held in 1960; bylaws require an annual vegan conference). The AVS administers cooking classes, gourmet vegan dinners by culinary students, encouraging culinary students to learn vegan cooking by hosting events with only vegan food, and other food events.

Currently this is four AVS-coordinated and hosted events each year; the template for these events is used increasingly throughout America. Outreach at public events (vegan books, vegan literature, and speaking about veganism). Other support for direct inquiries, consulting for vegan community outreach. It collects, aggregates, and publishes a comprehensive list of vegan-oriented VegFests around the United States. Prior to broad and widely-accessible search capabilities of the Internet, the American Vegan Society published networking and business resources which supported vegan lifestyle.

== History ==
In 1960, 26-year-old H. Jay Dinshah founded the American Vegan Society. Later that year Dinshah married the English-born Freya Smith. Freya, whose parents were active in The Vegan Society (of England), contributed to the early growth of the American Vegan Society and is president of the AVS today. The American Vegan Society is headquartered at Malaga, New Jersey, on a parcel of land which is called "SunCrest", or "the SunCrest Educreational Center". During Dinshah's life, the AVS was characterized by vegan publishing and outreach, annual vegan conferences, vegan archiving, spiritual inspiration, providing people with an experience of vegan living, vegan food-preparation demonstrations, maintenance of a small veganic garden, and extensive networking. Dinshah served the AVS as its president and as editor of its publication, Ahimsa magazine (1960–2000). In 2000, Dinshah died of a heart attack at age 66, after a life of promoting veganism.

In 1974, the organization helped to found the North American Vegetarian Society in preparation for hosting the 1975 World Vegetarian Congress in the United States for the first time. The Congress was held in Orono, Maine.

Smithsonian Magazine in 2011 wrote: "Like its predecessors, the vegan society connects a meat-free diet to a number of other causes, including moral and environmental considerations. Among the reasons for veganism the group's website lists are: health; 'an equitable, ethical relationship between human and other living creatures'; 'spiritual development'; and 'practical solutions to the population explosion.'"

Ahimsa magazine was a quarterly publication that explored compassionate living ("Ahimsa" meaning "dynamic harmlessness") as a philosophy, practical aspects of vegan living, and personal and cultural resources for vegans. Ahimsa included vegan menus and recipes, and news about food. The American Vegan Society continues to publish a quarterly periodical, now titled American Vegan, with the motto "Ahimsa lights the way." The AVS is now led and managed by its president, Freya Dinshah, and advised by the AVS Council of Trustees, all of whom are vegans, and operated by a team of staff and volunteers.

The American Vegan Society "promotes a compassionate, healthful, and sustainable lifestyle, empowering", and is known for advocating for vegan foods. The diet is plant-sourced, varied, and abundant. For ethical, health, environmental, and other reasons, (vegans) reject all animal products in food, clothing, and commodities, and the exploitation of animals for sport or entertainment. AVS is guided by the doctrines of Ahimsa (non-slaughter, non-violence) and Reverence for Life, and provides community and friendship to those following and learning about this way of living."

Donald Watson in England (and possibly others) coined the term 'vegan' in 1944; it referred to an entirely plant-based diet (with or without spiritual or philosophical or ethical underpinnings). American Vegan Society used the term vegan to mean dynamic harmlessness and successfully developed a broad social base of practicing vegans who committed themselves to that meaning and practice.

In 1948, Nimmo and Rubin Abramowitz formed the first vegan organization in the United States known as the U.S. Vegan Society, in Oceano, California. The Society lasted from 1948 to 1960 and was a predecessor to the American Vegan Society. They both joined this latter one when Dinshah founded it in 1960.

- 1961 – the American Vegan Society organized and carried out a Coast to Coast Crusade for Veganism across North America, including various parts of Canada and the USA.
- 1965 – the American Vegan Society organized and carried out North Atlantic Lecture Tour (Iceland, Britain, Europe).
- 1967 and 1968 – the American Vegan Society organized and carried out an international ("Round the World") Lecture Tour.

== American Vegan Center ==
The American Vegan Society opened the American Vegan Center on September 9, 2021, at 17 North Second Street in Philadelphia's Old City. The center has a bookstore, an event space, a demonstration kitchen, and a gift shop. It is the first public space operated by the American Vegan Society. Journalist Vance Lehmkuhl directs the center and provides 75-minute walking history tours of Philadelphia's vegan history, with stops to discuss Benjamin Lay, Benjamin Franklin, Caroline Earle White, Anthony Benezet, and others, including national figures such as Sylvester Graham.

== Dynamic Harmlessness Day ==
Dynamic Harmlessness Day is celebrated on November 2 each year. The day remembers American Vegan Society founder Jay Dinshah, who created the term "dynamic harmlessness".

== American Vegan Society conventions ==
Annual Conferences have been held since 1960.

Alternate conferences and conventions have been held largely in the northeastern US (New Jersey and New York) but also earlier in California, then later in California (Arcata), Colorado (Denver), Oregon (Portland), and Washington (Olympia), often sharing logistical responsibilities with local and regional vegetarian societies. For a number of years, beginning in 1989, convention proceedings have been videotaped.

The Dinshahs conducted weekend workshops, cooking classes, and other educational programs at SunCrest in Malaga as early as 1969, when their first building (headquarters) was donated.

In 1995, the AVS cohosted the 8th International Vegan Festival in San Diego, California, with VUNA (Vegetarian Union of North America) and Vegans International (VI).

Incomplete List of American Vegan Society conventions:

- AVS Vegan Conferences have been held annually since 1960.

Some of these conferences were:

- 1960 – Malaga, New Jersey(?)

– Some annual conferences were in California during the 1960s

- 1969 – Malaga, New Jersey: Educreational Program
- 1987 –
- 1989 – Arcata, California (videotaped)
- 1991 – Denver, Colorado (videotaped)
- 1993 – Portland, Oregon (videotaped)
- 1995 – San Diego, California: 8th International Vegan Festival, co-hosted with VUNA (Vegetarian Union of North America) and Vegans International (VI)
- 1996 – ?Johnstown, Pennsylvania (with the World Vegetarian Congress?)
- 1997 – Olympia, Washington (videotaped)
- 1998 – Olympia, Washington (videotaped)
- 1999 – Boulder, Colorado (videotaped)
- 2000 – Toronto, Ontario
- 2001 – Malaga, New Jersey (AVS HQ) – 41st Annual Convention (May 26 and 27, 2001)
- 2002 – Philadelphia, Pennsylvania – International Scientific Conference on Chinese Plant Based Nutrition and Cuisine – February 15, 16, 17, 2002 (videotaped)
- 2002 – Malaga, New Jersey (AVS HQ) – 42nd Annual Convention (May 26, 2002)
- 2003 – Malaga, New Jersey (AVS HQ) – 43rd Convention of American Vegan Society (May 25, 2003)
- 2004 – Malaga, New Jersey (AVS HQ) – 44th Convention of American Vegan Society (May 30, 2004)
- 2005 – Malaga, New Jersey (AVS HQ) – 45th Convention of American Vegan Society
- 2006 – Malaga, New Jersey (AVS HQ) – 46th Convention of American Vegan Society
- 2007 – Malaga, New Jersey (AVS HQ) – 47th Convention of American Vegan Society
- 2008 – Malaga, New Jersey (AVS HQ) – 48th Anniversary American Vegan Garden Party (May 25, 2008)
- 2009 – Malaga, New Jersey (AVS HQ) – 49th Anniversary American Vegan Garden Party (May 2009)
- 2010 – Malaga, New Jersey (AVS HQ) – 50th Anniversary American Vegan Garden Party (May 30, 2010)
- 2011 – Malaga, New Jersey (AVS HQ) – 51st Anniversary American Vegan Garden Party (May 29, 2010)

Additional workshops

- 2002 – South Jersey, Philadelphia, Washington, DC – Day-Long Workshop with Vesanto Melina, RD, MS
- 2003 – Kind Café, 724 North 3rd Street, Philadelphia, Pennsylvania – World Vegan Day (November 1, 2003)
- 2007 – Candle 79 154 E 79TH New York, New York – World Vegan Month (November 17, 2007)
- 2010 – Atlantic Cape Community College – Spring Celebration Dinner (March 23, 2010)

== See also ==
- List of vegetarian and vegan festivals
- List of vegetarian and vegan organizations
- North American Vegetarian Society
- Vegan Awareness Foundation
- World Vegan Day
