= ProVeg International =

NGO promoting plant-based food

- Founders: Sebastian Joy; Tobias Leenaert; Melanie Joy
- Type: Non-governmental organisation
- Purpose: Nutrition, health, ecology and animal ethics
- Origins: Founded in 2017, oldest origins in 1867
- Region served: World
- Method: Information, support, campaigns
- Founding President: Sebastian Joy
- Global CEO: Jasmijn de Boo
- Subsidiaries: ProVeg Deutschland; ProVeg Nederland
- Website: https://proveg.org/

ProVeg International (/ˈprəʊvɛdʒ/) is a non-governmental organisation that works in the field of food system change and has ten offices globally. The organisation's stated mission is to accelerate the transition to a sustainable global food system by making plant-rich foods and alternative proteins more accessible and appealing. ProVeg's vision 'is a world where the food we eat is good for all people, animals, and our planet'.

ProVeg operates in Germany (ProVeg Deutschland, founded as Vegetarierbund Deutschland in 1892), the Netherlands (ProVeg Nederland, founded as Viva Las Vega's in 2011), Belgium, China, Czechia, Poland, South Africa, Spain, the United Kingdom, and the United States.

== History ==
ProVeg International was founded in Germany, Poland and the United Kingdom in 2017. Its name derives from Latin pro- ('in favour of') and veg, supposedly denoting "the veggie movement, meaning people interested in a plant-based lifestyle". ProVeg has the following country branches.

- Belgium, incorporated in June 2022, founded in 2000 as EVA (Ethisch Vegetarisch Alternatief) and formerly Vegetariërsvereniging.
- China, launched in 2018.
- Czechia since August 2021, after the incorporation of the Czech Vegan Society, founded in 2014.
- Germany (ProVeg Deutschland). Before co-founding ProVeg, it was known as Vegetarierbund Deutschland (Vebu). Vebu itself was the result of mergers between associations, the oldest one being the Verein für natürliche Lebensweise founded in 1867.
- Netherlands, the former organisation Viva Las Vega's, founded in 2011 and incorporated in November 2017 as ProVeg Nederland.
- Poland, co-founding branch of ProVeg International in April 2017.
- South Africa, taken over in August 2018, founded in 2011 as Vegalicious.
- Spain, where a branch started in October 2017.
- United Kingdom, co-founding branch of ProVeg International in April 2017.
- United States, operating since 2019.

== Activities ==
=== Conferences ===
- COP (United Nations climate change conferences): ProVeg representatives attended COP24 in 2018. Having gained permanent observer status at the UN Framework Convention on Climate Change, the organisation has guaranteed access to COP events since the end of 2019. At COP27, ProVeg organised a pavilion on food systems change with CWF and Four Paws.
- New Food Conference: the New Food Conference organised by ProVeg is an international event focusing on plant-based and cultured products developments. The first edition took place in Berlin in March 2019.
- Vegan Summerfest: In cooperation with Berlin Vegan and the Albert Schweitzer Foundation, ProVeg is the main host and co-organiser of the annual Vegan Summerfest (German: Veganes Sommerfest), a three-day vegan food festival that takes place on the Alexanderplatz in Berlin. The 2019 edition featured around 100 information and selling stands.
- VegMed: ProVeg hosts VegMed, an annual international medical congress on plant-based diet. It is aimed at physicians, medical students, healthcare professionals, as well as scientists and related disciplines. In 2019, the sixth edition was held in London, the first VegMed outside Germany.

=== Food industry development ===
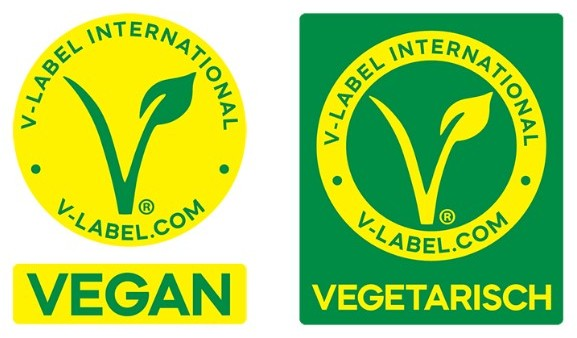
- The V-Label in its vegan and vegetarian versions
  Smart Protein: In October 2019, ProVeg International was awarded funds to carry out Smart Protein, an EU-funded project including over 30 partners to develop commercially viable plant-based products from underutilised raw materials. From 2020 to 2024, ProVeg assesses markets for the Smart Protein targeted-proteins ingredients and food products by investigating consumer acceptance and trust towards innovative and new plant-based products.
- V-label: In Germany, ProVeg International is responsible for licensing the V-label, an international label that certifies vegetarian and vegan products.
- ProVeg Incubator: the business incubator arm of ProVeg, created to support vegan startups, as well as startups using cellular agriculture techniques. It was established in October 2018, and according to Forbes, it was the first business incubator of its kind. The incubator has an international outlook, engaging in its activities within several countries. It counts Mark Post and Ryan Bethencourt among the members of its mentoring programme. By May 2020, the Incubator has supported over 30 startups from 15 different countries. By 2021, the Incubator has supported 50 startups.

=== Publications ===
- European Consumer Survey: ProVeg International launched a European Consumer Survey on Plant-Based Foods, which surveyed over 6,000 consumers across nine European countries to identify priorities for products improvement and development. 76% of participants identified as plant-based eaters, while the other 24% called themselves reducers. The survey's first report, published in June 2020, among other things found that participants were primarily interested in increasing the availability of plant-based cheese in supermarkets; additionally, reducers wanted to see more plant-based ready meals and meat replacements, while plant-based eaters were more interested in plant-based baked goods and chocolates.
- Pandemic report: In July 2020, ProVeg published the Food & Pandemics Report, stating that intensive animal farming is the most dangerous man-made cause of pandemics and epidemics such as COVID-19, Ebola, SARS and MERS, all of which are zoonotic. As slaughterhouses are particularly vulnerable to infection and forced shutdowns, this also disrupts the food supply chain that humans rely on for survival. The report, citing various scientific experts and organisations, concluded that fundamental changes in the current global food system would be necessary to prevent future pandemics. The report received support from the United Nations Environment Programme (UNEP), with Musonda Mumba saying increased interactions between humans, wild animals and farmed animals have created unprecedented opportunities for pathogens to spread. European Centre for Disease Prevention and Control (ECDC) chief Tamas Bakonyi nuanced some of the report's findings, adding that intense human global travelling (especially in groups), human overpopulation, deforestation, land use, the transportation of goods and other factors played key roles in causing pandemics as well.

=== School programmes ===
- Plant Powered Pupils: ProVeg launched its Plant Powered Pupils programme in 2016, supported by the German health insurance company BKK ProVita. The programme aims to educate children and adolescents about the impact of their food choices through interactive cooking workshops.
- Climate-Efficient School Kitchens: Climate-Efficient School Kitchens is a joint project between ProVeg and the Institute for Future Studies and Technology Assessment (Institut für Zukunftsstudien und Technologiebewertung, IZT), which provides free training for kitchen staff, trainee chefs, and caterers in ways to prepare sustainable, low-cost, healthy meals in public schools. This features ingredients such as plant-based, low-carbon-footprint alternatives to meat, as well as energy-saving kitchen appliances.
- School Plates: ProVeg launched the School Plates programme in the UK in June 2018 with the goal of making primary school menus healthier.

=== European Union campaigns ===
==== EU 'veggie burger ban' (Amendment 165) and dairy ban (Amendment 171) ====
The European Parliament Committee on Agriculture and Rural Development proposed Amendment 165, prohibiting meat and dairy names for plant-based alternatives (such as 'vegetarian sausage' and 'soy schnitzel'), as these were allegedly 'confusing' in May 2019. ProVeg International fought the proposal, which was ultimately rejected.

On 8 October 2020, ProVeg co-signed a letter to Members of the European Parliament asking to vote down the proposal, alongside IKEA and Compassion in World Farming. ProVeg also ran a petition against the amendment. Within three days, the petition received over 16,000 signatures., and over 150,000 signatures by 15 October 2020. ProVeg vice-chair Jasmijn de Boo told The Guardian: '[the ban] is clearly nonsense. Just as we all know there is no butter in peanut butter, consumers [buying veggie burgers] know exactly what they're getting. These proposals are in direct contradiction of the EU's stated objectives in the European Green Deal and Farm to Fork strategy to create healthier and more sustainable food systems.' On 23 October 2020, the European Parliament voted against Amendment 165.

However, on the same day the European Parliament did pass on Amendment 171 to future sittings, a restriction on plant-based dairy alternative names, which would have outlawed food labels including 'yogurt-style', 'cheese-alternative', 'almond milk' and 'vegan cheese'. ProVeg also ran a campaign and petition against Amendment 171, and the European Parliament withdrew it in May 2021.

==== EU animal products advertisements ====
In 2020 and 2021, ProVeg criticised the EU's advertisement campaigns for animal products made on EU territory.

== Governance ==
ProVeg established a working group on diversity and inclusion in 2018. It has pledged to offer nine disability-inclusive jobs by 2024. ProVeg e. V., the NGO's legal entity in Germany, follows the transparency standards (Initiative Transparente Zivilgesellschaft) of the German Transparency International chapter.

Charity auditor Animal Charity Evaluators (ACE) reviewed ProVeg Germany's predecessor VEBU in 2016, including a workplace culture survey. It had recommended ProVeg's predecessor VEBU as a "standout charity" in its 2016 rating. VEBU merged with other organisations to form ProVeg International, and ACE also ranked the new organisation as a "standout charity" in 2017 and 2018. In 2019 however, ACE no longer listed ProVeg International due to concerns of sexist behavior raised by some staff members. Since then, ProVeg has taken steps towards improving its culture, adding more diversity and anti-discrimination trainings and education, and a third member to their executive team, Jasmijn de Boo. ACE welcomed this prior decision to add a woman to the executive team. De Boo became 'Global CEO' of ProVeg International in 2022, with Sebastian Joy's title changing to 'Founding President'.

Charity Navigator, an independent charity assessment organization that evaluates hundreds of thousands of charitable organizations based in the United States, rates ProVeg International with four out of four stars.

== Recognition ==
ProVeg has permanent-observer status with the United Nations Framework Convention on Climate Change (UNFCCC), is a member of the UNFCCC Climate Technology Centre and Network (CTCN), and is accredited for UN Environment Programme (UNEP) Assembly.

ProVeg has received the United Nations’ Momentum for Change Award in 2018 for two of its programmes: Climate-Efficient School Kitchens and Plant-Powered Pupils.

== See also ==
- List of vegetarian and vegan organisations
