= ProVeg Nederland =

Dutch foundation promoting plant-based food

- Logo of the ProVeg International umbrella; ProVeg Nederland does not have its own logo.
- Founded: 19 October 2011; 15 years ago
- Founder: Veerle Vrindts, Pablo Moleman, Alex Romijn et al.
- Type: Non-governmental organisation
- VAT ID no.: KVK 53813596
- Legal status: Stichting
- Purpose: Advancing a plant-based food system
- Location: Utrecht
- Origins: Stichting Viva Las Vega's
- Region served: Netherlands
- Method: Information, support, campaigns
- Strategic Director: Pablo Moleman
- Operations Director: Joey Cramer
- Affiliations: ProVeg International; ProVeg Deutschland
- Website: proveg.com/nl

ProVeg Nederland (/ˈprəʊvɛdʒ/), known as Viva Las Vega's (VLV) from 2011 to 2017, is a Dutch foundation that aims to accelerate the transition towards a plant-based food system. The foundation's stated goal is to make it easier for consumers to eat plant-based more often and also to help companies address the growing demand in plant-based products. ProVeg Nederland is a member of the international ProVeg International.

== History ==
ProVeg Nederland started as an initiative in 2011 under the name Viva Las Vega's, when a group of students (including cofounders Veerle Vrindts, Pablo Moleman and Alex Romijn) organised a vegan festival, the Viva Las Vega's Festival, at Vrije Universiteit Amsterdam. A foundation was formally established and the group started to develop other activities.

In 2017, Viva Las Vega's decided to commence cooperation with the new umbrella organisation ProVeg International, which has offices around the world. For better recognisability, the foundation therefore rebranded itself to ProVeg Nederland from 1 January 2018.

== Activities ==
=== Effective altruism ===
The foundation operates according to the principles of effective altruism, meaning that its campaigns are based on research and real impact. The foundation performs its own research and cooperates with other organisations around the Netherlands to increase the effectiveness of vegan campaigning and explore new effective methods.

=== Festivals and fairs ===
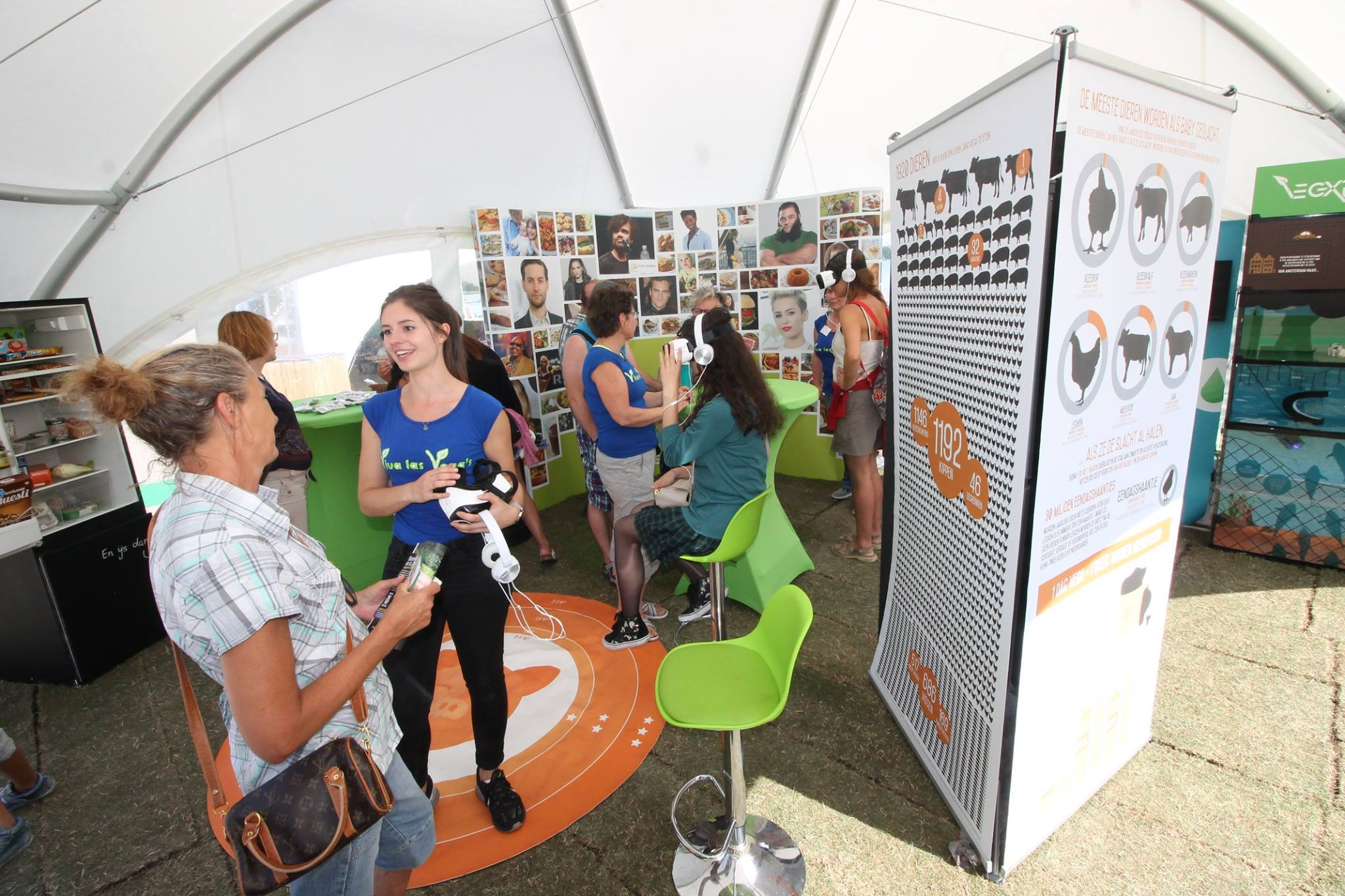
ProVeg's Vegxperience at the City Gardens Festival Almere 2017

The Viva Las Vega's Food Festival was relocated in 2012 to the De Hallen in downtown Amsterdam and became an annually recurring event. There were also one time events held in Nijmegen and Rotterdam. Since 2016, ProVeg Nederland has been hosting the annual Dutch festival of VeggieWorld in Utrecht, replacing the earlier VLV Food Festivals. The first edition attracted over 7,600 visitors, making it the largest vegan fair in the Netherlands. The 2020 VeggieWorld edition attracted 9,000 visitors. With the travelling exhibition Vegxperience, ProVeg Nederland also participates in other fairs and events. In December 2015, ProVeg organised the first vegan Christmas market in the Netherlands in Rotterdam-Noord under the name "Viva Las Vega's Food Festival, Christmas Edition", succeeded by the "VeggieWorld WinterFair" in Expo Haarlemmermeer in December 2017.

=== VeggieChallenge ===
During the first festival in 2011, the VeggieChallenge was launched, a challenge to eat less meat for 30 days. Since its inception, over 20,000 people have taken part. In 2013, the foundation and the Nederlandse Vereniging voor Veganisme (NVV) jointly initiated the VeganChallenge, whereby participants try to reduce their consumption of all animal products over the course of a month. The VeganChallenge was organised twice a year; the October 2015 edition had 2,700 participants. Every day people taking part received tips and recipes to cook and eat plant-based meals. Since June 2014, the NVV has continued the VeganChallenge on its own, while VLV and later ProVeg focused on growing the VeggieChallenge. In early 2019, ProVeg Nederland launched a crowdfunding campaign that garnered 15,000 euros develop a free app that allowed people to take up the VeggieChallenge, individually and internationally in any month, using their phones. Before the app's launch on World Vegan Day (1 November 2019), 100,000 people had participated in the VeggieChallenge over the course of 8 years; after the launch by all branches of ProVeg International, its website claimed over 250,000 people had internationally taken part in it as of June 2020. The spike in participants was mostly attributed to a sudden interest in avoiding meat after 1.2 million people watched popular satirical news television programme Zondag met Lubach on 24 November 2019, which featured an exposé about mistreatment of animals in slaughterhouses that shocked many spectators. Veerle Vrindts stated that the challenge normally attracted about 2,000 people a month, which increased by 342% in the first three days after the show.

=== Public campaigns ===
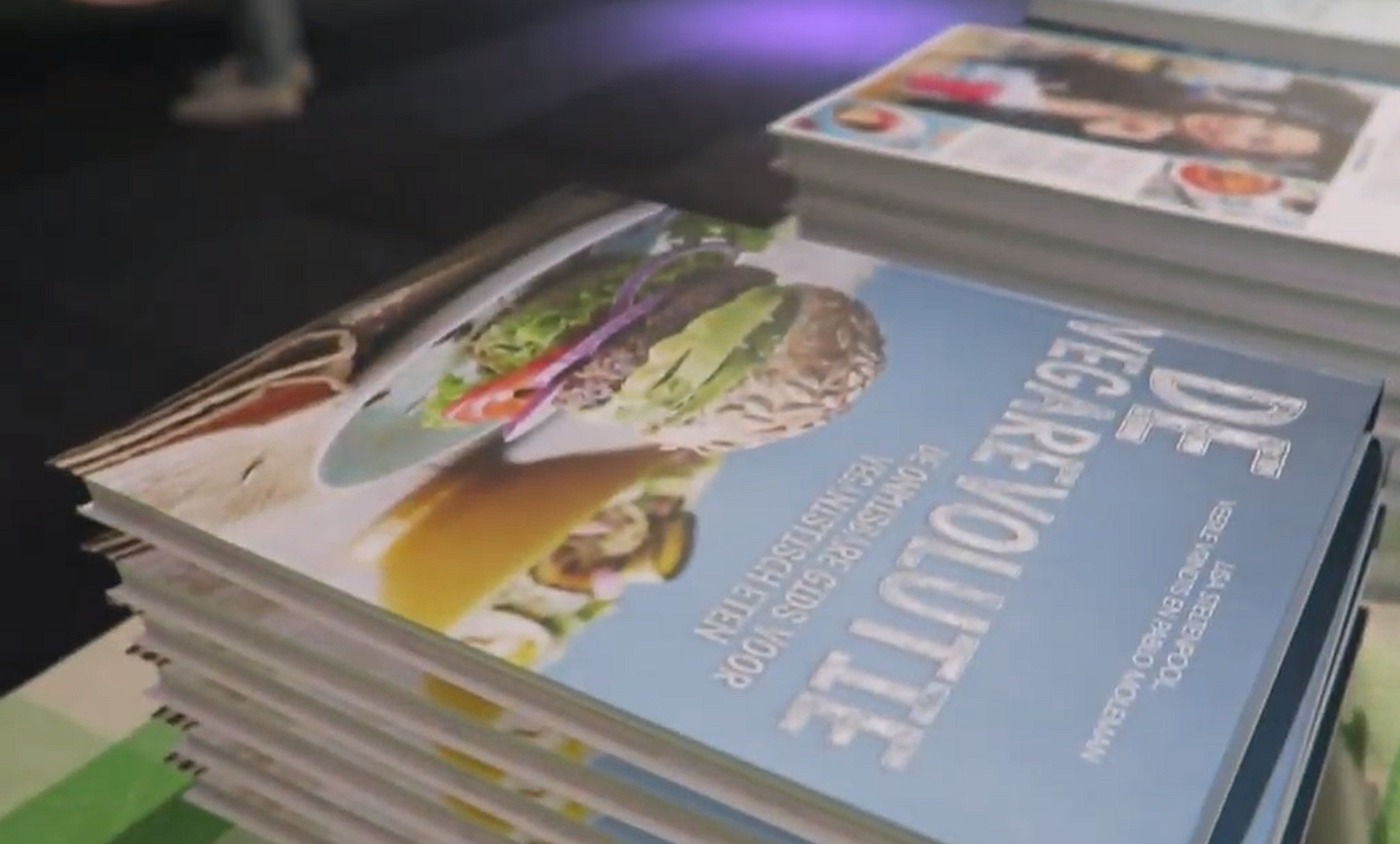
De Vegarevolutie for sale at a stand at the Veggie Food Fair 2017

In 2014, the foundation published a handbook for beginning vegans, titled De Vegarevolutie. De onmisbare gids voor veganistisch eten ('The Veggie Revolution. The Unmissable Guide to Vegan Food'). The book was written by Lisa Steltenpool, a dietitian and then-president of the foundation, together with Veerle Vrindts and Pablo Moleman.

After the European agricultural commission adopted a proposal to prohibit meat and dairy names for plant-based alternatives (such as 'vegetarian sausage' and 'soy schnitzel', as these were allegedly 'confusing') in April 2019, ProVeg launched a petition to prevent this intended 'veggie burger ban'. According to Moleman, consumers want to know what they buy, and references to products they are already familiar with give customers 'relevant information about taste, texture and application that they can expect from a plant-based product'. Within three days, the petition received over 16,000 signatures. In December 2019, Medical Care Minister Bruno Bruins, as part of the 'Food Labelling Action Plan', decided that these 'meat names' would remain permissible as long as it is clear to consumers that it is a vegetarian product; this meant that the meat industry was not given a monopoly on words such as 'burger, schnitzel and smoked sausage'.

=== Influencing the market ===
The foundation stimulates the development of a vegan market through an investment fund for startups, in November 2018 replaced by the international ProVeg Incubator. Furthermore, it cooperates with companies and advises food retailers on how to expand their plant-based options.

Together with the Platform Eiwitinnovatie ('Protein Innovation Platform'), the foundation contributes to enlarging the number of vegan options and the replacement of animal ingredients. For example, ProVeg cooperates with meat analogue manufacturers to replace the use of chicken egg protein, and helped manufacturer GoodBite launch several new vegan meat substitutes. A large number of snackbars, including the Smullers chain, introduced vegan mayonnaise in response to the "Met Zonder Ei" campaign. Moreover, the foundation also introduced vegan cheesecake at several CoffeeCompany branches.

== See also ==
- List of vegetarian and vegan organizations
