= Ihnat =

Ihnat (Belarusian: Ігнат; Ukrainian: Ігнат) can be a masculine given name or a surname. It is a Slavic version of Ignatius. Notable people with this surname include:

== As a surname ==
- Steve Ihnat (1934–1972), Slovak-American actor and director
- Yurii Ihnat (born 1977), Ukrainian serviceman

== As a given name ==
- Ihnat Bujnicki (1861–1917), Belarusian actor and theatre director
- Ihnat Kančeŭski (1896–1923), Belarusian poet and writer

See also

== See also ==
- Ignat (Игнат)
- Hnat
- Ignacy
- Ignác
- Ignjat (Игњат)
