= Teva =

Teva (Hebrew: טבע 'nature') may refer to:

== Businesses ==
- Teva, a brand of Deckers Brands footwear
- Teva Naot, Israeli footwear manufacturer
- Teva Pharmaceuticals, Israeli multinational pharmaceutical company
  - Teva Canada

== Organizations ==
- Teva Learning Alliance, American Jewish environmental education organization
- Textile and Clothing Workers' Union (Finnish: Tekstiili- ja vaatetustyöväen liitto, Teva)
- World Esperantist Vegetarian Association (Tutmonda Esperantista Vegetarana Asocio)

== People with the given name ==
- Teva Harrison (1976–2019), Canadian-American writer and artist
- Teva Rohfritsch (born 1975), French Polynesian politician
- Teva Victor (born 1971), French sculptor
- Teva Zaveroni (born 1975), Tahitian footballer

== Other uses ==
- Téva, French TV channel

== See also ==
- Tevatron, a circular particle accelerator
