= Jasmijn de Boo =

Vice president of ProVeg International

- Born: August 1975 (age 50)
- Citizenship: Dutch
- Education: BSc (Hons) Animal Management; MSc Applied Animal Behaviour and Animal Welfare
- Political party: Party for the Animals (NL); Animals Count (UK)

Jasmijn de Boo (/ˈdʒæzmɪn də ˈboʊ/ JAZ-min də BOH; born August 1975) is a Dutch veganism and animal rights activist and the Global CEO (formerly vice president) of ProVeg International.

== Career ==
De Boo worked at the (now defunct) European Resource Centre for Alternatives in higher education (EURCA) at the Faculty of Veterinary Medicine, Utrecht University in the Netherlands. Later, she co-developed an animal welfare syllabus for veterinary students, on behalf of the UK branch of the World Society for the Protection of Animals (now World Animal Protection) and the University of Bristol School of Veterinary Science. It was launched in 2003. In 2006, de Boo founded the UK political party Animals Count (now Animal Welfare Party).

From 2011 to 2016, de Boo was chief executive of the Vegan Society in Birmingham, England. During that time, the charity doubled its number of staff from 12 to 24 full-time equivalents. In 2015, de Boo hosted representatives of the German association VEBU on their visit to the Vegan Society in Birmingham.

In 2017, VEBU co-founded ProVeg International and renamed itself ProVeg Germany. De Boo joined the ProVeg International executive team in the following year, and became vice president in May 2020.

== Political candidacies ==
De Boo ran in four elections but did not get elected. In 2004, she ran on the party list of the Party for the Animals, as candidate 5 out of 19. After founding Animals Count, she ran for the London Assembly in Lambeth and Southwark in 2008, with the proposal for an NHS-style animal healthcare system. She also ran as lead candidate of the party in the 2009 European Parliament elections. In 2010, she ran for the Party for the Animals in the Dutch general election.

Election	Constituency	Candidate for	Votes	%	Seats
2004 European Parliament election	Netherlands	Party for the Animals	party: 153,432 de Boo: 1,638	3.22 0.03	0
2008 London Assembly election	Lambeth and Southwark	Animals Count	de Boo: 1,828	1.12	0
2009 European Parliament election	East of England	Animals Count	party: 13,201	0.82	0
2010 Dutch general election	Netherlands	Party for the Animals	party: 122,317 de Boo: 691	1.3 0.007	2

== Personal life ==
De Boo has been vegan since January 2003 (when she was 27), "mainly [for] the animals". She previously became vegetarian in 1987 (aged 11 or 12).

De Boo has a partner, Andrew Knight, who is a professor of animal welfare. The couple occasionally co-author scientific publications.
