= Hnativka =

Hnativka (Ukrainian: Гнатівка) is the name of several places in Ukraine derived from the Ukrainian given name Hnat. It may refer to:

- A village, part of Bilohorodka
- A village, part of Kostiantynivka
- Former name of Avhustynivka
- Hnativka, Mlyniv Raion
- Hnativka, Haisyn Raion

== See also ==
- Anatevka
- Ignatovka, a Russian-language toponym with the same derivation
