= NVV =

NVV may refer to these organisations:

- Nederlands Verbond van Vakverenigingen, a Dutch trade union (1906–1984)
- Nederlandse Vereniging voor Veganisme, a Dutch vegan association (formed 1978)
- Nordhessischer Verkehrsverbund, a German rail and bus network (formed 1994)
