= ProVeg Incubator =

German business incubator

- Formation: 2018
- Location: Berlin, Germany
- Coordinates: 52.501°N 13.358°E
- Parent organization: ProVeg International
- Website: provegincubator.com

ProVeg Incubator is a business incubator based in the Tiergarten district of Berlin, Germany. It was established in 2018 as part of the wider ProVeg International non-governmental organisation.

ProVeg Incubator supports plant-based and cultured-meat startups that develop plant-based and other alternative protein products, with the ultimate goal of reducing the worldwide consumption of animal-based products.

== History ==
The ProVeg Incubator was established in November 2018. The opening day was set for 1 November, to coincide with World Vegan Day. At its launch, it was billed as "Europe's first" plant-based incubator. Since its inception, over 50 startups have graduated from its accelerator programme, raising over €35 million altogether.

The main office of the ProVeg Incubator is located in Berlin, Germany. The location was chosen to host the incubator due to the city’s vegetarian and vegan food culture, as well as its large number of startups, including vegan ones.

The scope of the incubator is global in outlook, and it accepts applications from any country. As of June 2021, its most recent cohort attracted startups from Europe, Mexico, Chile, and India.

The incubator also supports a wide variety of alternative pathways to reach their goal, including innovations such as cultured meat, fermented products, and dairy alternatives. Among the programme's graduates, 10 startups were producers of dairy-alternative products. More recently, the incubator has extended its reach with startups working on seafood, fish, and egg alternatives.

The fifth batch of startups to be accepted to the incubator drew some attention from the press, due to the presence of a majority of female founders.

== Activities ==
The ProVeg Incubator operates as part of ProVeg International, a non-governmental organisation that works in the field of food system change. The incubator is headed by Albrecht Wolfmeyer. The incubator space covers 450 square metres (4,800 sq ft) in central Berlin, and includes a co-working space, event space, and test kitchen.

The incubator was established to support the development of food startups in the plant-based, fermentation, and cellular agriculture spaces, by assisting them with business planning, strategy, and networking. Since its creation in 2018, it has fostered the development of over 50 startups, including Formo (previously Legendairy), Remilk, Vly Foods, Gourmey, and Mushlabs.

The programme has a duration of three months, and is open to all startups creating alternatives to animal-based food products. The emphasis is on promoting innovative products and ingredients, going beyond plant-based mainstays which have already seen widespread commercialisation, such as tofu.

Similarly to other accelerators, the ProVeg Incubator programme ends with a startup demo day.

ProVeg Incubator drew attention from the Russian edition of Forbes, due to its role in fostering the local plant-based-meat startup, Greenwise.

== Collaboration ==
The medium-term goal of ProVeg Incubator is to reduce the global consumption of animal products by 50% by 2040 and works with associations with similar goals, such as the AAFPP in Russia, and Humane Society India.

Other collaborators include Matthew Glover - managing director of Veg Capital and co-founder of Veganuary. Veg Capital is an investor in some of the accelerator's startups. Profits gained by Veg Capital as part of the cooperation will be donated back to ProVeg.

The network of mentors included Jan Bredack (Veganz), Mark Post, and Ryan Bethencourt.
