= World Esperantist Vegetarian Association =

Esperanto organization

Logo of World Esperantist Vegetarian Association shows its Esperanto-language motto Vivu kaj lasu vivi ("Live and let live.")

The World Esperantist Vegetarian Association (Esperanto: Tutmonda Esperantista Vegetarana Asocio, TEVA) is a voluntary association of Esperanto-speaking vegetarians. Founded in 1908, the group's working language is Esperanto, and it is the oldest international organization of vegetarians that is currently active. TEVA published a journal, Vegetarano ("Vegetarian") from 1914 to 1932, revived in 2009 as Esperantista Vegetarano, and has also operated a spirited Internet mailing list through Yahoo! Groups since 2005.

== Esperanto and vegetarianism ==
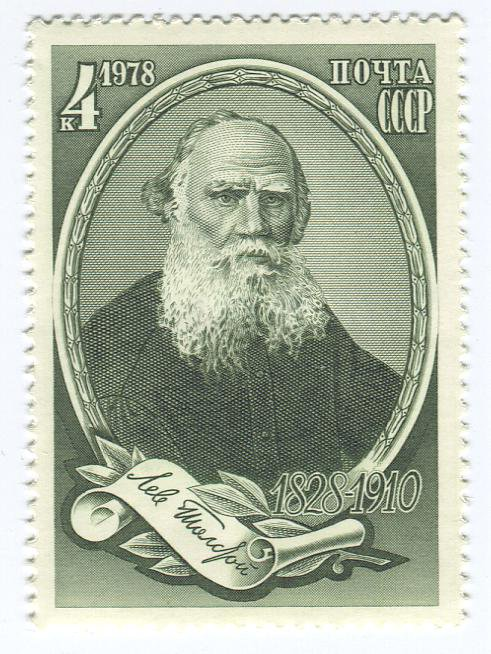
Famed Russian writer Leo Tolstoy, honorary president of the World Esperantist Vegetarian Association (TEVA) at its founding in 1908, is honoured on a Soviet Union stamp issued in 1978 to commemorate the sesquicentennial of his birth.

Surveys among members of the British Esperanto Association (1968) and the German Esperanto Association (1992) have found that there are proportionally far more vegetarians among Esperanto speakers than among non-Esperantists. Peter Forster, author of The Esperanto Movement, suggests that there is a general relationship between vegetarianism and pacifism—and, therefore, also between vegetarianism and Esperanto.

== History of TEVA ==
Already by 1893 two favourable articles about vegetarianism, had appeared in La Esperantisto ("The Esperantist")—both later incorporated into Fundamenta krestomatio (1903), L. L. Zamenhof's basic Esperanto reader: La hejmo de la metiisto ("The home of the craftsman") and Kio estas vegetarismo? "What is vegetarianism?"). A third example may also be mentioned: an article about the longevity of centenarians, which pointed out that a common factor seemed to be a largely plant-based diet. The publication of such stories and articles suggests that Zamenhof himself had a positive attitude towards vegetarianism.

On 16 August 1908, at the Fourth World Congress of Esperanto in Dresden, Germany, the International Union of Esperantist Vegetarians (Internacia Unuiĝo de Esperantistaj Vegetaranoj, IUEV) was founded. Several years later the group changed its name to Vegetarian Esperantist League (Vegetara Ligo Esperantista, VLE). Finally, just after World War II, it adopted its present name, World Esperantist Vegetarian Association (Tutmonda Esperantista Vegetarana Asocio, TEVA).

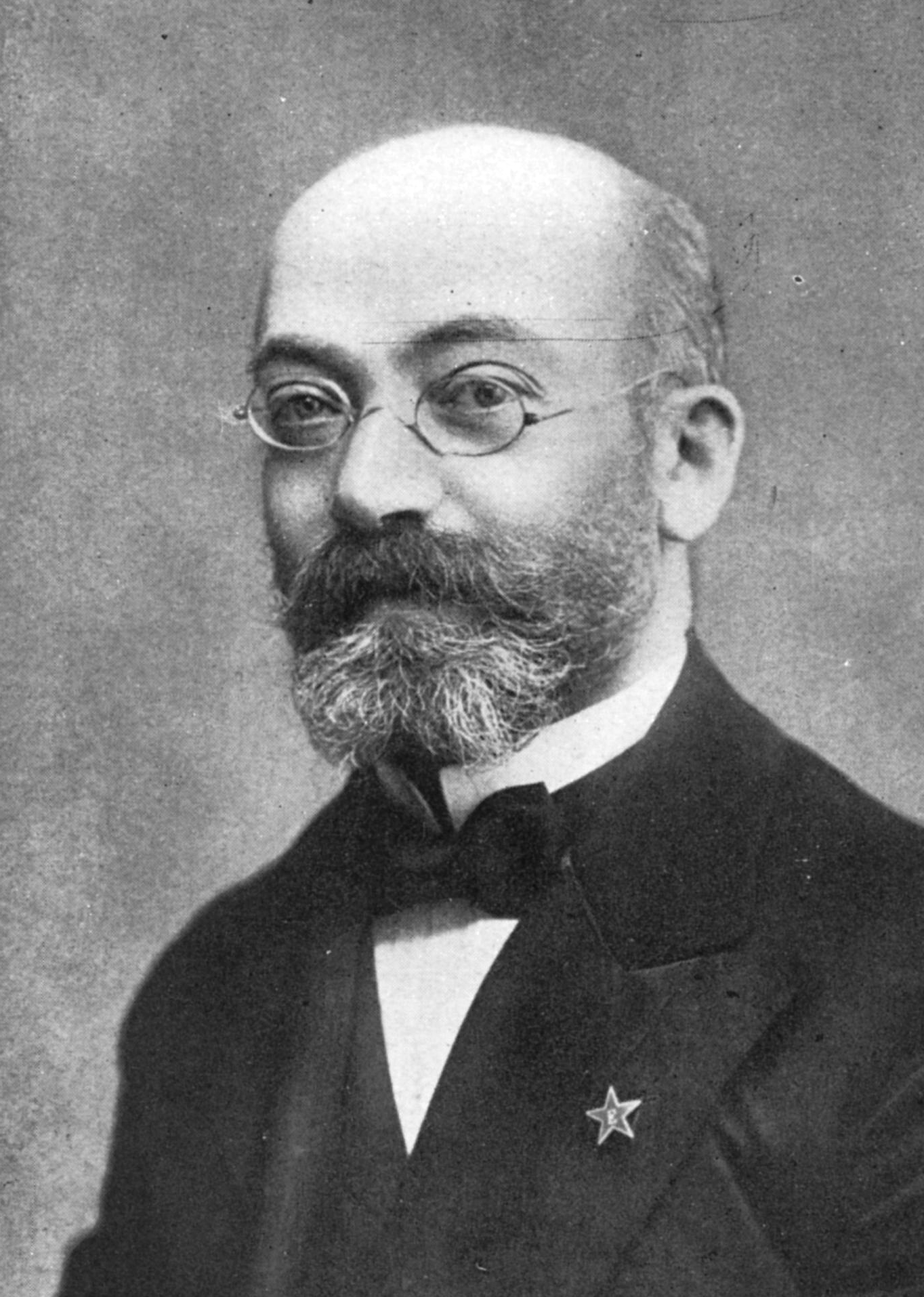
Early in the history of the Esperanto movement, the language's creator, L. L. Zamenhof, published several articles favourable to vegetarianism. The photograph was taken at the 1908 World Congress of Esperanto in Dresden.

The association was founded at the instigation of René de Ladevèze. According to the Enciklopedio de Esperanto, Leo Tolstoy (himself a committed vegetarian) agreed to serve as its honorary president. According to Esperantista Vegetarano (1995, p. 23), Ludwik Zamenhof was also among the 19 founding members but requested that this not be mentioned in their vegetarian literature. This information has not been corroborated elsewhere.

Two days after the IUEV founding convention, the International Vegetarian Union (IVU) was established, also in Dresden, this latter group intended primarily as an association of those vegetarians who were not also Esperantist.

J. Arthur Gill, an Esperanto speaker who was secretary of a Quaker group known as the Friends Vegetarian Society, founded in 1902, had suggested that the vegetarian non-Esperantists could hold their own founding convention in connection with the earlier event and that Esperanto vegetarians could attend both events and help international understanding at the IVU's convention through the neutral medium of Esperanto. In the end, however, only a few Esperantists actually attended the IVU founding convention on 18 August 1908.

By the time of its 1913 IVU convention at The Hague, Esperanto was one of the IVU's five official languages, along with English, French, German and Dutch.

In 1914 the first issue of the magazine Vegetarano appeared, edited by Esperantist August Oskar Bünemann (1885–1958). From 1927 until 1932, the magazine was both a magazine for Esperantist vegetarians and an official organ of the International Vegetarian Union. In addition to Esperanto-language articles, it contained information about international vegetarianism written in English, French and German. For financial reasons, IVU stopped publishing the magazine in 1932.

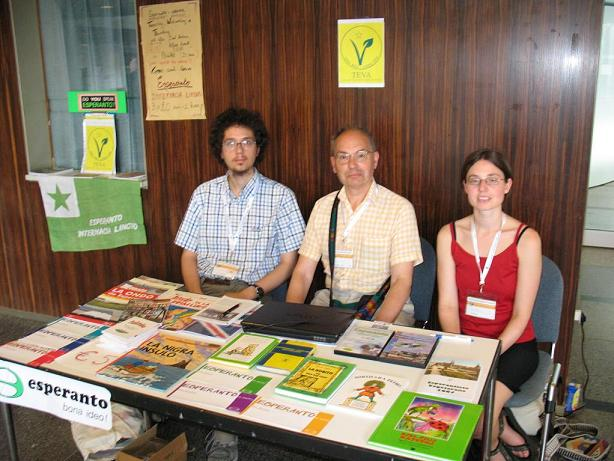
TEVA directors during the 38th convention of the International Vegetarian Union in Dresden, August 2008. Left to right: Francesco Maurelli, Christopher Fettes and Heidi Goes

In 1954, Nathan Ben Zion Havkin, founder of the Palestine-Israel Vegetarian Foundation, reorganized TEVA, which was further reawakened in 1971 by Arnošt Váňa, of Slovakia (1909–1998). He introduced a principle whereby instead of paying a fixed membership fee, members could individually decide on the amount of their annual donation. TEVA maintained this system until 2008.

In 1992 Váňa was succeeded as president by Christopher Fettes, a Briton who had become an Irish citizen. For a few years a schism resulted, as TEVA had to reconcile inconsistent records of Italian and Slovak membership numbers and donation receipts, and had also to resolve uncertainty as to who had been chosen as board members to represent those countries. The problems were blamed on the 85-year-old Váňa, whose health had begun to deteriorate in the last years of his life before he died in 1998. The schism was eventually healed when the membership ended Váňa's experiment, replacing his leadership through a loose collective of friends with a restored society structure properly governed by its constitution and by-laws through a democratically elected board.

Among the above-mentioned activists or supporters, four have served as honorary presidents of TEVA: Leo Tolstoy, René de Ladevèze, Nathan Ben Zion Havkin and Arnošt Váňa.

== TEVA's aims and activities ==
According to its constitution and by-laws, the association aims to "promote Esperanto among vegetarians and vegetarianism among Esperantists... in active and friendly and active collaboration, with the goal of respect for nature and all living beings." Its motto is Vivu kaj lasu vivi ("Live and let live").

Since 2009 TEVA has published the twice-yearly magazine Esperantista Vegetarano (approx. 40 pages per issue), successor to both the previously published Vegetarano and the Letero de la Esperantista Vegetarano supplement.

Its meetings are not arranged independently, but are usually held in conjunction with the annual meeting of the World Congress of Esperanto. In addition, TEVA affiliates with other Esperantist and vegetarian groups. For example, TEVA members worked at the 36th International Vegetarian Union convention in 2004 in Florianópolis, Brazil, and at its 38th convention in Dresden, where the IVU and TEVA jointly celebrated their 100-year jubilee.

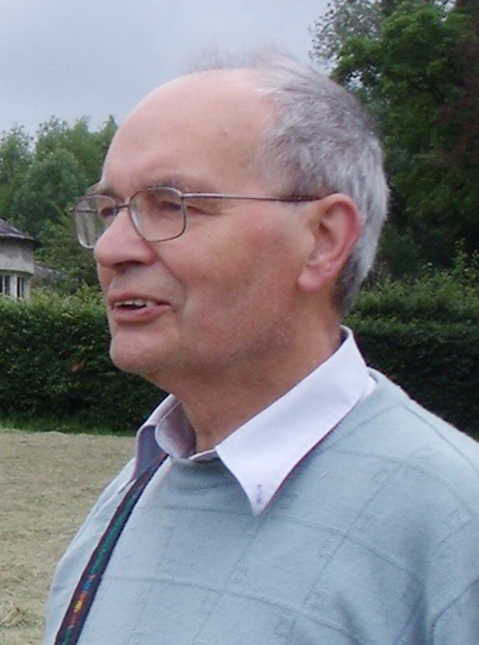
Christopher Fettes, photographed at his estate in Ireland in 2011

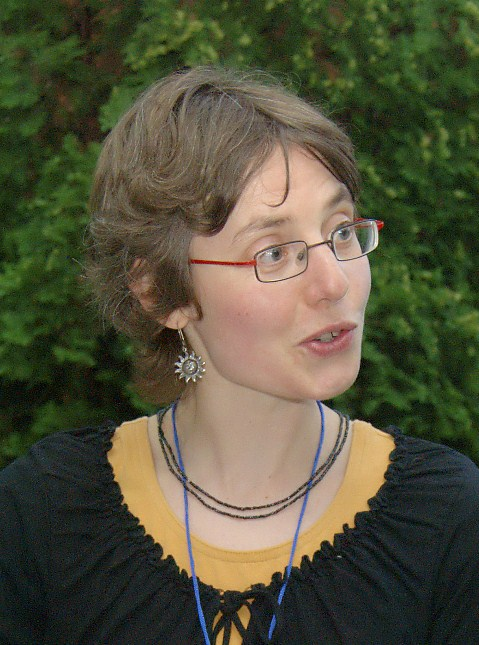
Flemish Esperantist Heidi Goes, general secretary-treasurer of the World Esperantist Vegetarian Association (TEVA), during the 94th World Congress of Esperanto in Białystok, Poland

With representatives currently in 22 countries, the group is a member of both the International Vegetarian Union and the European Vegetarian Union, as well as being a specialized association affiliated with the World Esperanto Association, known by its Esperanto acronym as UEA.

In 2008, TEVA started a blog at the photo-sharing and social-networking site Ipernity; in 2009 TEVA added a group of Esperantist vegetarians through the social networking company CouchSurfing International.

== TEVA executive ==
During its 2008 convention in Rotterdam, TEVA elected a new board of directors, comprising:

- Christopher Fettes (Ireland), president
- József Németh (Hungary), vice president and journal editor
- Francesco Maurelli (Scotland), vice president and site webmaster
- Heidi Goes (Belgium), secretary-general (and by June 2009 also Treasurer)

== See also ==
- List of vegetarian and vegan organizations
