= ProVeg Deutschland =

German non-profit organisation

- Founded: 1892; 134 years ago
- Founder: Ernst Hering
- Type: Non-governmental organisation
- Purpose: Nutrition, health, ecology and animal ethics
- Location: Berlin
- Origins: Vegetarierbund Deutschland, Leipzig
- Region served: Germany
- Method: Information, support, campaigns
- Members: c. 14,000
- Director: Sebastian Joy
- President: Thomas Schönberger
- Affiliations: ProVeg International; ProVeg Nederland; European Vegetarian Union
- Website: proveg.com/de

ProVeg Deutschland (/ˈprəʊvɛdʒ/, previously Vegetarierbund Deutschland e. V. (VEBU), in English translated as German Vegetarian Association) is a German non-profit organisation whose goal is to reduce the consumption of animal products. ProVeg Deutschland is part of ProVeg International, which serves as an international umbrella for a group of nationally operating organisations.

The eingetragener Verein's assembly seat and organisational headquarters is located in Berlin. As of 2015, ProVeg Deutschland had 14,000 members, which made it the largest organisation of meatfree living people in the German-speaking world. The association is a member of the European Vegetarian Union (EVU) and the International Vegetarian Union (IVU). Since 1996, Thomas Schönberger has served as its president. He publishes the member magazine ProVeg Magazin.

== Goals ==
According to its own stated objectives, the association strives to "establish in our society a nutritional style and agricultural attitude which are apt for the future, and are vegetarian or vegan, ecologically, ethically and socially responsible and economically viable." Furthermore, its stated goal is to reduce the average per capita meat consumption, to increase knowledge and awareness about the needs and interests of animals and to enshrine animal rights in the domain of nutrition, consumption and legislation. Scientific insights into the positive effects of a vegetarian or vegan lifestyle on the environment, in particular on the global climate and world hunger problematics, should be disseminated and an ecologically and economically sustainable diet should be promoted worldwide.

== History ==
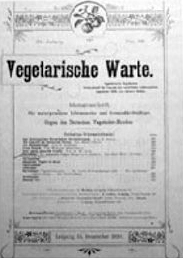
Title page of Vegetarische Warte, the first member magazine of the later VEBU

The beginning of the vegetarian movement in Germany lies in the 19th century. In 1867 in Nordhausen, Eduard Baltzer founded the Deutscher Verein für natürliche Lebensweise ("German Association for a Natural Lifestyle), which was followed by a series of other vegetarian associations. This association merged on 7 June 1892 with the Hamburger Vegetarierverein ("Hamburg Vegetarian Association") to become the Deutscher Vegetarierbund ("German Vegetarian League"). This association was founded in Leipzig with the goal of significantly reducing meat consumption in Germany, in order to contribute to a global improvement to ecological and health-related problems. At the time, the association's magazine was called Vegetarische Rundschau ("Vegetarian Review"), later Vegetarische Warte ("Vegetarian Lookout").

In 1932, vegetarians from across the world attended a conference in Oranienburg. However, the member magazine could no longer appear since 1933. Under pressure from the Nazis, who accused vegetarian organisations of "promoting pacifism", the association had to dissolve itself on 18 February 1935.

After the Second World War, a re-establishment took place in 1946, although it was hindered by the separation of the Allied occupation zones of Germany. Therefore, at the instigation of Adolf Briest, initially two clubs emerged, the Vegetarier-Union Deutschlands ("Vegetarian Union of Germany"; VUD) on 29 May 1946 in Sontra near Kassel (American occupation zone) and the Deutsche Vegetarier-Union ("German Vegetarian Union"; DVU) in the French occupation zone, which lasted until the 1970s. The new magazine Der Vegetarier ("The Vegetarian") was founded in 1956, and the same year the Deutscher Vegetarier-Rat ("German Vegetarian Council") was established. From there, many local branches were formed in West Germany.

In 1973, the VUD merged with the Freundeskreis der deutschen Reformjugend and became the Bund für Lebenserneuerung. Vereinigung für ethische Lebensgestaltung, Vegetarismus und Lebensreform ("League for Life Renewal. Association for Ethical Life Design, Vegetarianism and Life Reform"). This complex name was given the simple predicate Vegetarierbund Deutschland ("Vegetarian League Germany", VEBU), which became its sole name from 2008 onwards.

At an extraordinary member assembly on 22 April 2017 in Berlin, a name change from VEBU to ProVeg Deutschland was agreed upon, and the association became part of the umbrella ProVeg International.

== Membership evolution ==
Before the year 2008, the membership had stagnated. Since then, however, a strong membership growth has occurred. This was due to new memberships, but also because of the absorption of the Vegetarische Gesellschaft Stuttgart ("Stuttgart Vegetarian Society", co-founded Gustav Struve in 1868) into the VEBU in 2012.

Year	Membership
2008	2,500
2009	2,800
2010	3,400
2011	4,800
2012	7,000
2013	10,000
2014	12,000
2015	14,000
2017	14,000

== Finances ==
ProVeg Deutschland primarily finances itself by membership contributions, donations, and income generated from licensing the European Vegetarian Union's V-Label. Furthermore, there is an Active Fund to support public relations. Since May 2014, VEBU/ProVeg Deutschland has carried the seal of the Initiative Transparente Zivilgesellschaft, which requires transparency about, for example, staff structure and expenses.

== Activities ==
Former logo

In Germany, the association has the authority to award the V-Label, which is a seal of approval for vegetarian and vegan products. Among others, Aldi-Süd has been labeling some products with the V label since 2014.

In order to create a sustainable nutritional situation, it has initiated a series of campaigns. The Thursday is Veggieday campaign aims to promote vegetarian and vegan food in restaurants and in canteen catering. ProVeg also calls on active and interested parties every year to participate in the Worldwide Vegan Bake Sale, the annual vegan cake campaign days and to participate in the meatout campaign days.

Since 1999, the member magazine has been quarterly published under the title Vebu Magazin, later renamed ProVeg Magazin, with about 16,000 copies and a size of 48 pages. Furthermore, ProVeg and the Veggie Times produce and distribute a newspaper that should give interested people and beginners an overview and tips about a plant-based lifestyle. In addition, various information media are used to reach members and interested parties. There is also a veggie app for smartphones that can be used to find out about veggie-friendly restaurants on the go. In addition to general public relations work and services for members and interested parties, ProVeg also has a press office that represents ProVeg in the media.

As a local contact point for vegetarians and vegans, the concept of regional groups or regional contacts was created, which as of 2014 consists of over 200 regional contacts and groups.

The VEBU was the organiser of the 38th World Vegetarian Congress 2008 in Dresden. The first VeggieWorld (promoted as 'Europe's largest fair for the vegan lifestyle') took place in February 2011'. This fair around the meat-free lifestyle with around 40 exhibitors, under the sponsorship of the VEBU in Wiesbaden with more than 20,000 visitors. The fair has also been held in Düsseldorf since 2011. At the same time, visitors to the supporting programme can find out about a sustainable lifestyle and plant-based nutrition. Celebrities have been guests, among others Attila Hildmann, Barbara Rütting, Marion Kracht, Ariane Sommer and Anne Menden.

ProVeg has been running its Karnismus erkennen (Recognising Carnism) project since autumn 2014 in cooperation with social psychologist Melanie Joy for public education around the theme of carnism. At the beginning of February 2016, a staging as part of a campaign caused a stir in the media: in the fictional Swiss restaurant La Table Suisse, pets like cats and dogs were offered for consumption. After media coverage in over 25 countries reported it and a shitstorm emerged on social media channels, the action was exposed in mid-February 2016 as a setup. ProVeg, the Swiss Association for Vegetarianism Swissveg and the Beyond Carnism association released a joint press statement.

== See also ==
- List of vegetarian and vegan organizations
