= Tobias Leenaert =

Belgian activist and writer (born 1973)

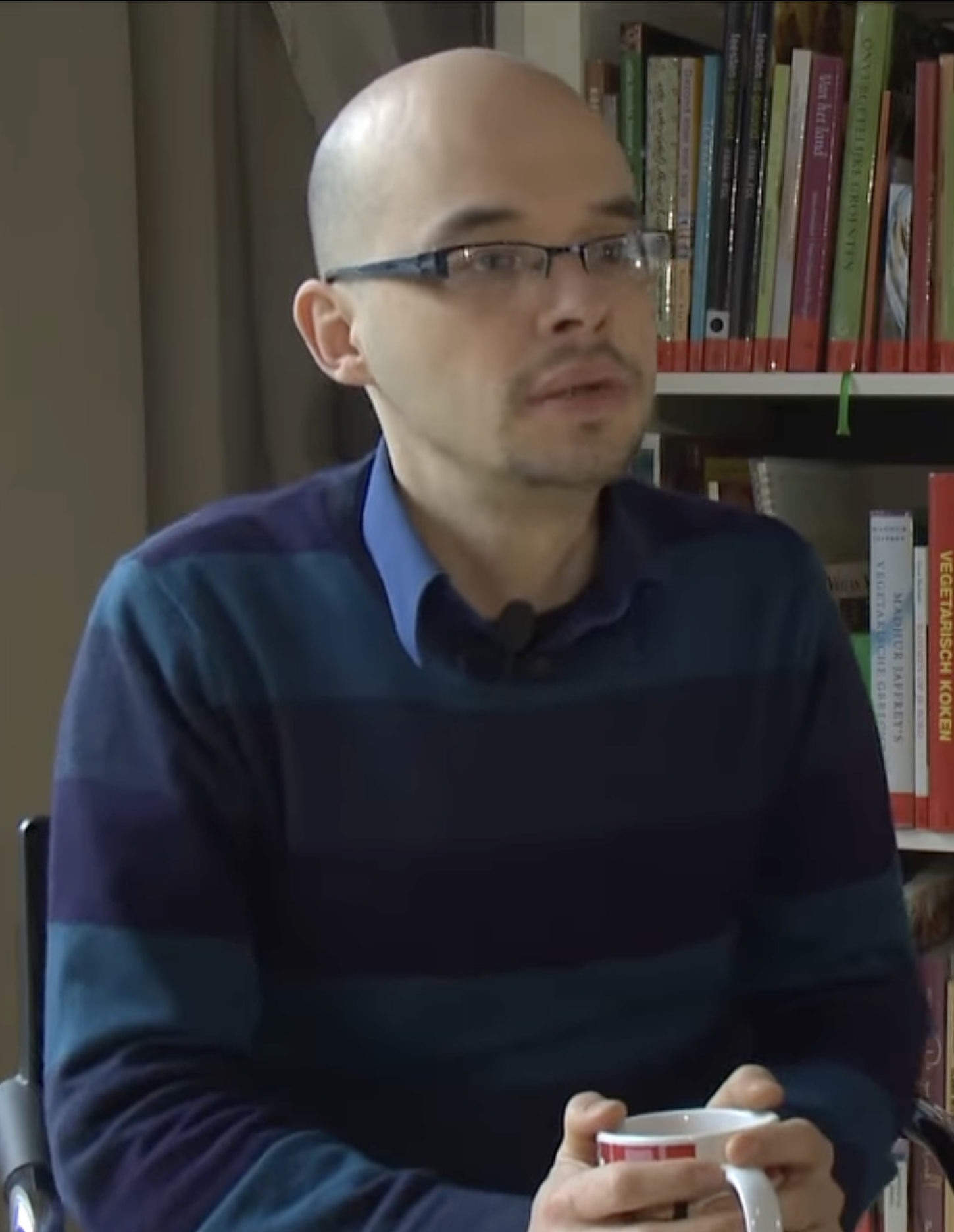
- Leenaert in 2014
- Born: 3 August 1973 (age 53); Ghent, Belgium
- Education: Ghent University
- Occupations: Activist; author; educator
- Known for: Animal rights and veganism activism
- Notable work: How to Create a Vegan World: A Pragmatic Approach (2017)
- Website: tobiasleenaert.be

Tobias Leenaert (Dutch: [ˈtoːbijɑs ˈleːnɑrt]; born 3 August 1973) is a Belgian animal rights and veganism activist, author, and educator. He has advocated a pragmatic approach to vegan activism and has co-founded several vegan and vegetarian advocacy organisations, including the Center for Effective Vegan Advocacy, ProVeg International, and Ethical Vegetarian Alternative. He is the author of How to Create a Vegan World: A Pragmatic Approach (2017) and writes the blog The Vegan Strategist.

== Early life and education ==
Tobias Leenaert was born in Ghent, Belgium, on 3 August 1973. He speaks Dutch and English. Leenaert studied German studies at Ghent University.

== Activism ==
Leenaert on the role of meat reducers (University of Basel)

In 2000, Leenaert co-founded Ethical Vegetarian Alternative (EVA) in Flanders, which he led until 2015. He originated Thursday Veggie Day in Ghent, which was launched in 2009. He also co-founded the Center for Effective Vegan Advocacy with Melanie Joy, and was a co-founder of ProVeg International.

Leenaert has argued for a pragmatic approach to vegan activism that does not rely only on moral arguments. In 2017, he published How to Create a Vegan World: A Pragmatic Approach. He also writes the blog The Vegan Strategist. His methods have been criticised by some abolitionist animal rights advocates, including Roger Yates.

Leenaert gives lectures and workshops on vegan advocacy. He has also written and spoken about wild animal suffering, which he has described as being as important as the suffering of domesticated animals.

== Personal life ==
Leenaert lives in Ghent with his partner, seven cats, and two dogs. He identifies as an effective altruist.
