= List of vegetarian and vegan organizations =

This is a list of vegetarian and vegan organizations situated in various locations worldwide. Their primary aim is to advocate for vegetarianism and veganism, while also providing support and networking opportunities for individuals and groups who practice, promote, or endorse these practices.

The largest international organization is the International Vegetarian Union (IVU), which serves as the connecting umbrella organization.

| Name (English / local (abbreviation)) | Founded | Region served | Notes |
|---|---|---|---|
| American Vegan Society (AVS) | 1960 | United States | |
| Christian Vegetarian Association (CVA) | 1999 | World | Founded in the United States |
| Dutch Society for Veganism / Nederlandse Vereniging voor Veganisme (NVV) | 1978 | Netherlands | Previously known as Veganistenkring and Vereniging Veganisten Organisatie |
| Earthsave | 1988 | United States; Canada | |
| European Vegetarian Union (EVU) | 1988 | Europe | Founded in the Netherlands, currently based in Austria |
| French Vegetarian Society / Sociéte végétarienne de France (FVS) | 1882 | France | Founded in Paris, dissolved in 1921. |
| HappyCow (HC) | 1999 | World | Founded in the United States |
| Hare Krishna Food for Life | 1974 | World | Founded in India, currently based in Slovenia |
| International Vegetarian Union (IVU) | 1908 | World | Founded in Germany, currently based in the UK |
| Jewish Veg | 1975 | North America | Previously known as Jewish Vegetarians of North America |
| North American Vegetarian Society (NAVS) | 1974 | North America | |
| Peepal Farm | 2014 | India | |
| Physicians Committee for Responsible Medicine (PCRM) | 1985 | United States | |
| ProVeg Germany / ProVeg Deutschland | 1892 | Germany | Founded as Vegetarierbund Deutschland (VEBU), renamed in 2017 when joining ProVeg International |
| ProVeg Netherlands / ProVeg Nederland | 2011 | Netherlands | Founded as Viva Las Vega's (VLV), renamed in 2018 when joining ProVeg International |
| ProVeg International | 2017 | World | Based in Berlin, serves as umbrella of all ProVeg organisations. |
| Scottish Vegetarian Society | 1892 | Scotland | Based in Glasgow, Scotland. Merged with the Vegetarian Society of the United Kingdom in the 1980s. |
| Swissveg | 1993 | Switzerland | Known as Schweizerische Vereinigung für Vegetarismus until 2014 |
| The Vegan Society | 1944 | World | Founded and based in the UK |
| Tibetan Volunteers for Animals (TVA) | 2000 | China; India | |
| Toronto Vegetarian Association (TVA) | 1945 | Canada | |
| Vegan Action | 1995 | United States | Also known as Vegan Action |
| Vegan Outreach | 1993 | United States | |
| Vegan Prisoners Support Group (VPSG) | 1994 | United Kingdom | |
| Vegetarian Society | 1847 | United Kingdom | |
| Vegetarian Society (Singapore) (VSS) | 1999 | Singapore | |
| Viva! Health | 1994 | United Kingdom | |
| V-Partei^{3} | 2016 | Germany | German political party |
| World Esperantist Vegetarian Association / Tutmonda Esperantista Vegetarana Asocio (TEVA) | 1908 | World | Founded in Germany |

== Campaigns and events ==
- Meat-free days
- Meatless Monday
- International Vegetarian Week
- Veggie Pride
- World Vegan Day
- World Vegetarian Day

== See also ==
- List of vegetarian and vegan companies
- List of vegetarian and vegan festivals
- List of fictional vegetarian and vegan characters
