= Vegetarian and vegan symbolism =

Set of symbols

Multiple symbols have been developed to represent lacto-vegetarianism and veganism. Several are used on food packaging, including voluntary labels such as The Vegan Society trademark or the V-Label (with support of the European Vegetarian Union) as well as the vegetarian and non-vegetarian marks mandated by the Indian government. Symbols may also be used by members of the vegetarian and vegan communities to represent their identities, and in the course of animal rights activism.

== Vegetarian symbols ==
=== Indian vegetarian mark ===
The green dot symbol (top-left) identifies lacto-vegetarian food, and the reddish-brown triangle symbol (top-right) identifies non-vegetarian food.

Packaged food and toothpaste products sold in India are required to be labelled with a mark in order to be distinguished between lacto-vegetarian and non-vegetarian. The symbol is in effect following the Food Safety and Standards (Packaging and Labelling) Act of 2006, and received a mandatory status after the framing of the respective regulations (Food Safety and Standards (Packaging and Labelling) Regulation) in 2011. According to the law, vegetarian food should be identified by a green symbol and non-vegetarian food with a brown symbol. They are defined as:

Vegetarian food must have a symbol of a green color-filled circle inside a square with a green outline prominently displayed on the package, contrasting against the background on the principal display panel, in close proximity to name or brand name of the food.

Non-vegetarian food (any food which contains whole or part of any animal including birds, marine animals, eggs, or products of any animal origin as an ingredient, excluding honey, milk or milk products), must have a symbol of a brown color-filled circle inside a square with a brown outline prominently displayed on the package, contrasting against the background on the principal display panel, in close proximity to the name or brand name of the food.

In 2021, FSSAI (Food Safety and Standards Authority of India) adopted a new symbol for non-vegetarian food items due to concerns that the combination of the old symbols were difficult for people with colour blindness to distinguish. The new symbol is that of a brown color-filled triangle inside a square with a brown outline.

In September 2021, the FSSAI announced adoption of the new vegan symbol.

=== V-Label ===

The V-Label, a V with a leaf, originated with the European Vegetarian Union. The V-Label is a standardised international vegan and vegetarian label supported by the EVU with the aim of easy identification of vegan and vegetarian products and services.

=== Vegetarian Society approved trademark ===
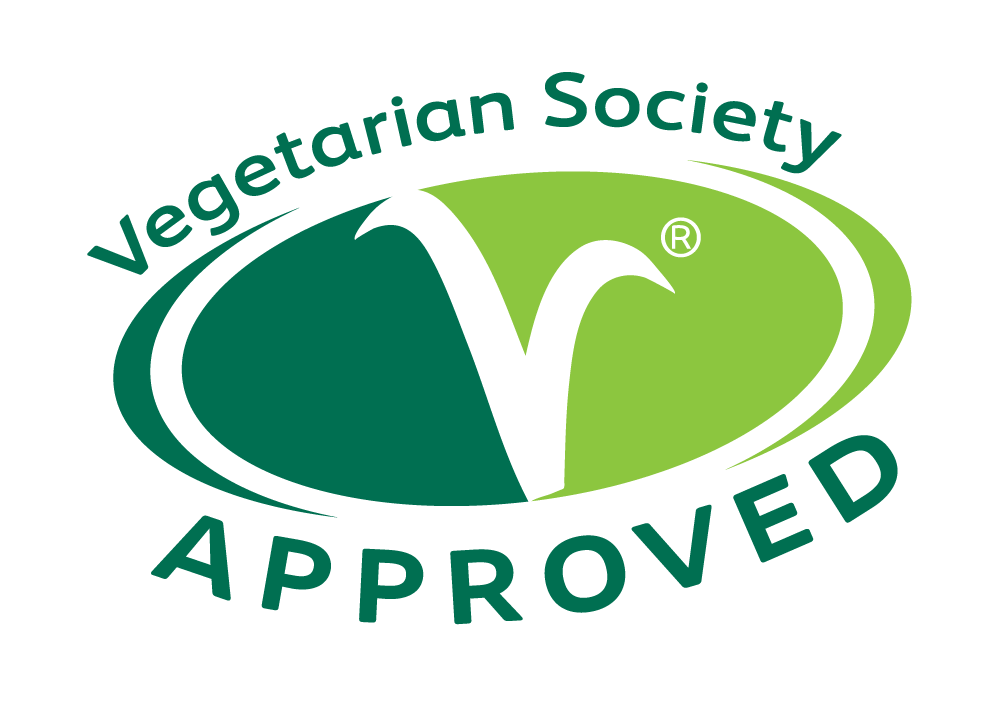
Vegetarian Society Approved vegetarian trademark

The Vegetarian Society Approved trademark is the world’s first vegetarian accreditation symbol and appears on thousands of products worldwide. It was created in 1969 by the Vegetarian Society who were established in 1847 and invented the word "vegetarian".

Any product displaying the Vegetarian Society Approved vegetarian trademark has been independently checked by the Vegetarian Society and meets these criteria:

- Contains no ingredient made from animal body parts
- Only free-range eggs are used
- Measures in place to avoid cross-contamination during production
- GMO-free
- No animal testing carried out or commissioned.

== Vegan symbols ==
=== Vegan Trademark ===
The Vegan Trademark, with its iconic sunflower, is an internationally recognised standard from The Vegan Society (who coined the term 'vegan'). It certifies products with the aim of easy identification of vegan products. Launched in 1990, it was the first vegan verification scheme. Any product displaying The Vegan Society's Vegan Trademark has been independently checked by The Vegan Society met these criteria:

- The manufacture and/or development of the product, and its ingredients, must not involve or have involved, the use of any animal product, by-product or derivative.
- The development and/or manufacture of the product, and its ingredients, must not involve or have involved, testing of any sort on animals conducted at the initiative of the company or on its behalf, or by parties over whom the company has effective control.
- The development and/or production of GMOs must not have involved animal genes or animal-derived substances. Products put forward for trademark registration that contains or may contain any GMOs must be labelled as such.

Over 70,000 products are registered with the Vegan Trademark.

=== Enclosed V ===
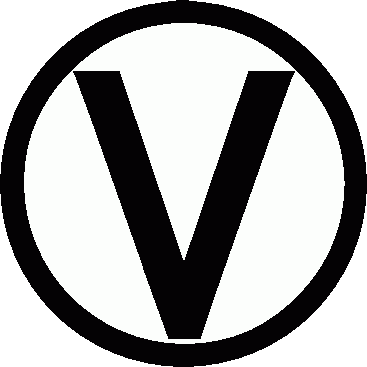

The enclosed v (modeled after the enclosed A symbol) is a popular vegan symbol, especially on social networks where it is represented by the Ⓥ symbol of the Enclosed Alphanumerics Unicode block. This lowercase "V" inside a circle is not used to label products as vegan nor should be relied upon to determine if a product is vegan. A kosher organization (Vaad Hoeir of St. Louis) owns and uses a US trademark (certification mark) consisting of an uppercase V inside a circle.

=== Emojis associated with veganism ===
On internet forums and social networks, the seedling emoji (🌱) or green heart symbol emoji (💚) are sometimes used to symbolize veganism or vegan products.

Sometimes the peace dove symbol emoji (U+1F54A) is also used in vegan/animal rights contexts to convey both peace and freedom/liberation for non-human animals.

=== Veganarchy symbol ===

The Veganarchy symbol, first introduced in print in Brian A. Dominick's Animal Liberation and Social Revolution pamphlet in 1995, combines the Circle-V with the Circle-A of anarchist symbolism.

=== Vegan flag ===
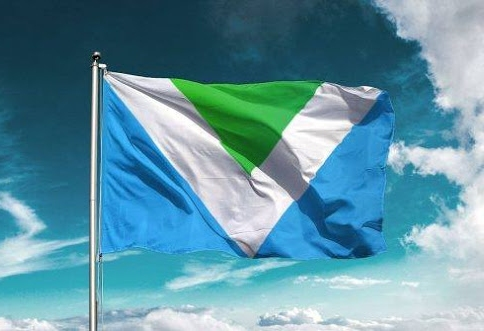

The vegan flag was designed in 2017 by a network group of graphic designers and activists from several countries. The group was opened by Gad Hakimi, a vegan activist and designer from Israel. who intended it to be a Civil flag to represent veganism. The flag consists of three blue and green triangles forming the letter V, the first letter in the word "vegan".

Originally, some members of the group suggested that animals should be featured on the flag, with red colours featuring prominently to symbolize the blood of slaughtered animals. However, the group eventually chose to make the flag about human–animal respect, not about animals themselves. Inspired by the LGBT rainbow flag, the flag was created in hopes of uniting animal rights organizations and activists. The colours white, green, and blue were chosen to represent the natural habitats of animals: sky, land, and sea. The letter V stands for Vegan, and is an inverted pyramid intended to symbolize the ability to do the impossible.

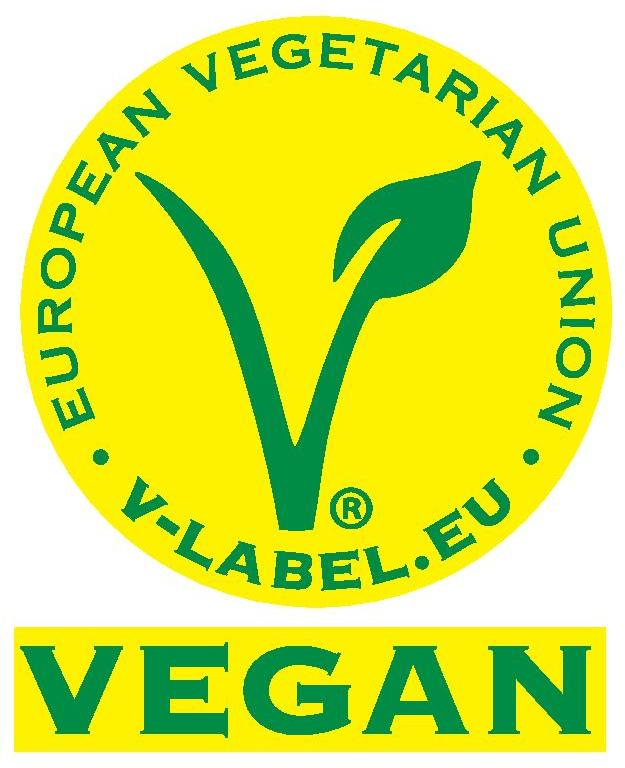

V-Label

The international V-Label supported by the European Vegetarian Union is an internationally recognised and protected trademark for the labelling of vegetarian and vegan products.

=== Vegetarian Society Approved vegan trademark ===
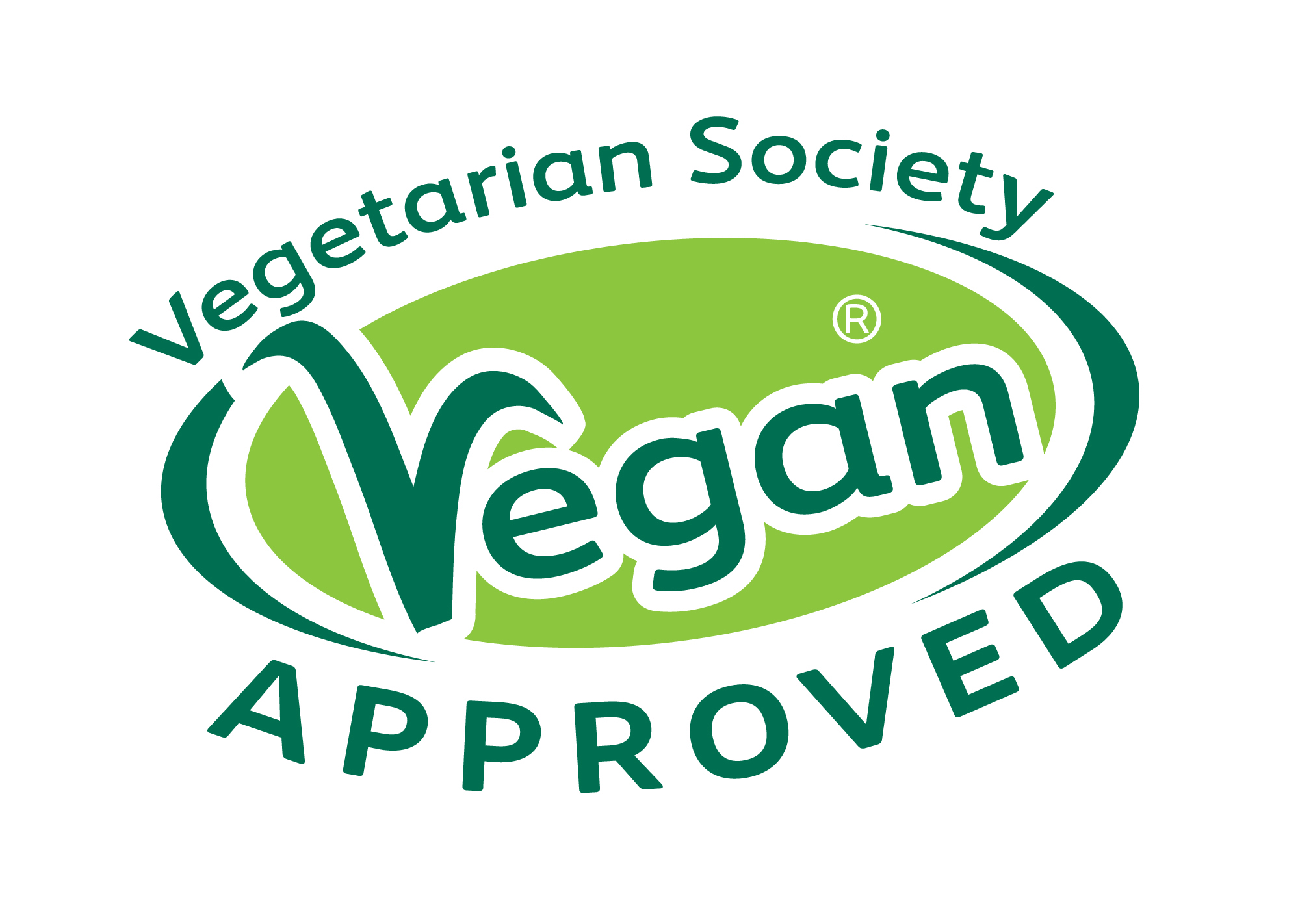

The Vegetarian Society Approved vegan trademark was established in 2017 and appears on thousands of products worldwide. Any product displaying the Vegetarian Society Approved vegan trademark has been independently checked by the Vegetarian Society and has met these criteria:

- Contains no animal-derived ingredients
- Measures in place to avoid cross-contamination during production
- GMO-free
- No animal testing carried out or commissioned.

In 2022 McDonald's launched their McPlant burger across the UK, accredited with the Vegetarian Society Approved vegan trademark.

=== Vegan food regulations in India ===
Indian label for vegan food

In 2022, the Food Safety and Standards Authority of India (FSSAI) has put in place regulations for vegan food products within the country. The new rules clearly define what constitutes vegan food and how brands can label it. The logo was designed by a Bengaluru-based, Food Science and Nutrition college student-Kruti Manish Rathore.

== See also ==
- List of food labeling regulations
- Food Safety and Standards Authority of India
