= Hnat =

Hnat (Ukrainian: Гнат) is a Ukrainian given name, an equivalent of Ignatius. It may refer to the following people:

- Surname:
  - Felix Hnat (b. 1982), Austrian animal rights activist
  - Virgil Hnat (1936—2001), Romanian handball player and coach
  - Zdeněk Hnát (b. 1935), Czech classical pianist
- Given name:
  - Hnat Domenichelli (b. 1976), Canadian-Swiss ice hockey player
  - Hnat Honcharenko (1853—c. 1917), Ukrainian kobzar
  - Hnat Khotkevych (1877—1938), Ukrainian writer, ethnographer and composer
  - Hnat Stefaniv (1895—1949), Ukrainian colonel of the Ukrainian Galician Army
