= Felix Hnat =

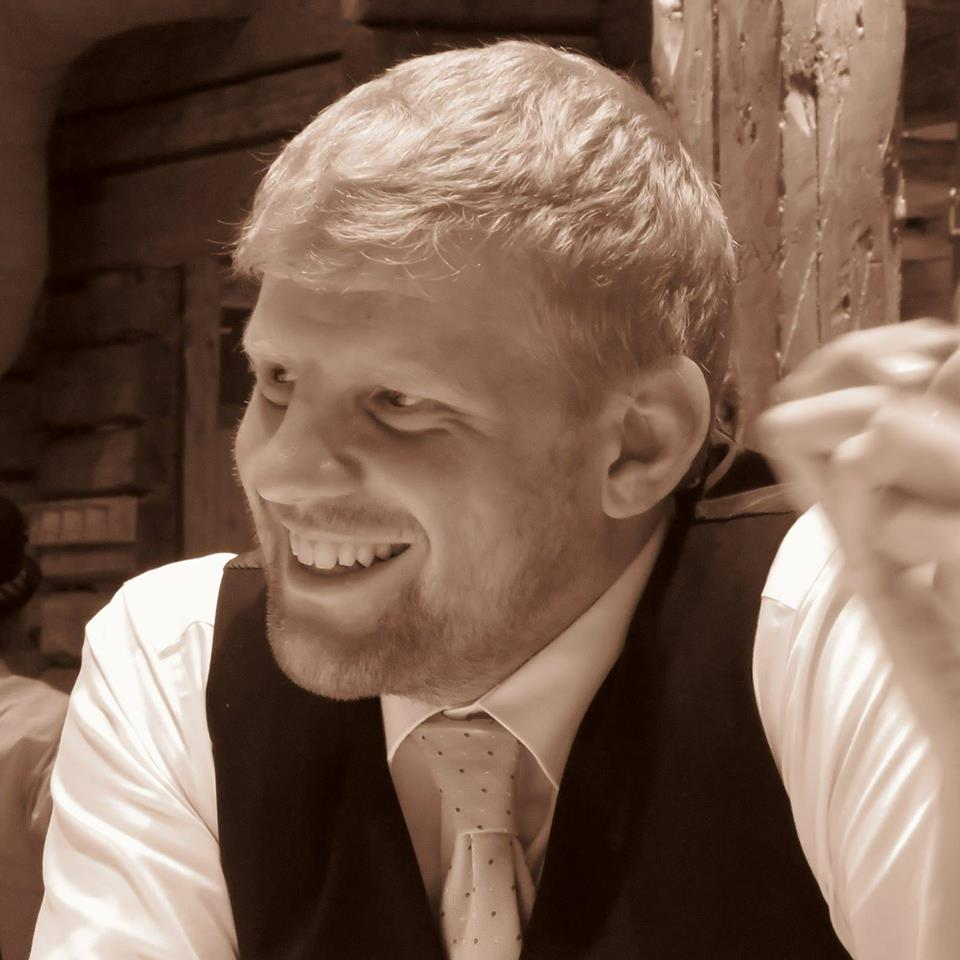
Hnat pictured in 2015

Felix Hnat (born 15 July 1982) is an Austrian animal rights activist and chairman of the Vegan Society Austria (Vegane Gesellschaft Österreich, VGÖ). Hnat was the second defendant alongside Martin Balluch in the controversial 2010–2011 animal rights activist trial at Wiener Neustadt, where he was eventually acquitted of all charges.

== Life ==
Felix Hnat studied economics at Vienna University of Economics. He graduated in 2006 with his thesis on "Agricultural subsidies in Austria under an animal-rights perspective". He had to stop his doctorate of economic sociology because of the animal rights activist trial.

== Animal rights and vegan advocacy ==
Felix Hnat's first involvement in the animal rights movement started as an activist at the Association against Animal Factories (Verein gegen Tierfabriken, VGT) in Austria. His protests against fur trade and especially contacting fashion houses like Kleiderbauer led to his involvement in the animal rights activist trial.

After the first non-final decision of acquittal Hnat worked a year in Berlin as project manager for the environmental protection project GV-nachhaltig, where he advised commercial kitchens.

Since 2005 Felix Hnat is chairman of the Vegan Society Austria (Vegane Gesellschaft Österreich, VGÖ), where he is additionally responsible for public relations. He is also vice president of the European Vegetarian Union. As chairman of the Vegan Society Austria he is involved in the organization of various events: The Veganmania summer festival in Vienna, the Veggie Planet exhibits, the Vegan Planet exhibition in Vienna and the Vienna Vegan Ball.

In his function as spokesperson of the vegan community, Hnat held lectures at the International Management Forum in Lindau (Germany), the colloquium on bakery of the Austrian Association of the Baking Industry (Vereinigung der Backbranche), the conference of the Austrian catering industry and an event at the European Parliament that was followed by a screening of the movie Cowspiracy: The Sustainability Secret.
