= Nederlandse Vereniging voor Veganisme =

Dutch vegan association

Nederlandse Vereniging voor Veganisme Dutch Association for Veganism
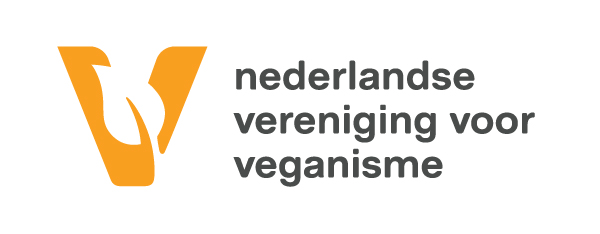
- Formation: 8 September 1978; 47 years ago
- Founder: Harm Breunis and others
- Type: Nonprofit organisation
- Purpose: Promoting the vegan lifestyle, and ending animal exploitation
- Region served: Netherlands
- Members: 4.100+ (1-1-2024); 4.000 (7-7-2020); 2.762 (27-12-2017); 1.891 (2015); 650 (2012); 360 (2005); 500 (1996)
- Chair: Daniëlle Vol-van der Holst
- Website: www.veganisme.org

The Nederlandse Vereniging voor Veganisme or NVV (English: Dutch Association for Veganism) is a Dutch association which strives to promote the vegan lifestyle, and to end animal exploitation.

== History ==
The association was founded on 8 September 1978 in Arnhem as the Veganistenkring ("Vegan Circle"), the first organisation in the Netherlands of its kind. Shortly thereafter, its name was changed to Vereniging Veganisten Organisatie ("Association Vegans Organisation"), finally adopting its present name in 1987.

The NVV's stated purpose is promoting a way of living, which is completely free from exploitation of animals, and advocating a healthy, wholly vegetable diet, to the benefit of human beings, animals, plant life and the environment. In the period 2012–2015, the association's membership tripled from almost 650 to 1891. At the start of the year 2017, the NVV had 2100 members.

== Activities ==
The NVV publishes Vegan Magazine, which is also available for non-members, distributed in organic shops and elsewhere. Initially, the magazine was called V. Furthermore, the association holds the VeganChallenge twice a year, a free online programme in which participants try to follow a vegan diet for a month. The campaign 'Melk, je kan zonder!' ("Milk, you can do without!") was an NVV initiative as well. It also maintains the online platform Vegan Wiki, which provides product information and information about veganism, and awards the Vegan Friendly logo to companies that make above average efforts to take the concerns of vegans into account. Moreover, the NVV is the main partner for Dutch companies who seek to apply for The Vegan Society's Vegan label for their products.

The NVV distributes a newsletter and maintains a website, webshop and a Facebook page, and holds a general assembly every year.

VegFest is an annual veganism fair, of which the NVV is one of the sponsors (NVV members pay half the entry fee). VegFest was held for the first time in November 2014 in the Martin Luther Church in Amsterdam, in November 2015 in the Jaarbeurs in Utrecht and in December 2016 as well.

== See also ==
- List of vegetarian and vegan organizations
