= Ryan Bethencourt =

- Born: Ryan Bethencourt; March 18, 1979 (age 47); Miami, Florida, U.S.
- Occupations: biohacker, venture partner

Ryan Bethencourt (born March 18, 1979) is an American scientist, entrepreneur, and biohacker best known for his work as co-founder and CEO of Wild Earth, partner at Babel Ventures and cofounder and former program director at IndieBio, a biology accelerator and early stage seed fund. Bethencourt was head of life sciences at the XPRIZE foundation, a co-founder and CEO of Berkeley Biolabs, a biotech accelerator, and Halpin Neurosciences, an ALS therapeutics-focused biotech company. Bethencourt co-founded Counter Culture Labs, a citizen science nonprofit, and Sudo Room, a hacker space based in downtown Oakland, California.

Bethencourt is a vegan and has worked on the development of several sustainable and cruelty-free products.

== Early life ==
Bethencourt has spent the past decade in the biopharmaceutical industry, collaborating with major companies such as Pfizer, AstraZeneca, Johnson & Johnson, Sanofi, Takeda, Amgen, and Genentech to develop new drugs from initial Investigational New Drug (IND) submissions to U.S. Food and Drug Administration (FDA) approval in the United States, European Union, and Japan. He has also served as COO at Genescient Pharmaceuticals, a longevity focused biotech startup and CEO of Halpin Neurosciences, an ALS focused startup. Bethencourt’s work has been featured in Wired, TechCrunch, Forbes, the San Francisco Business Times, and other publications. He regularly speaks on biotech innovation and writes for Biocoder, an O’Reilly Media publication. He's also an author of Forbes, Techonomy and Huffington Post.

Since Bethencourt co-founded IndieBio in 2014, he and his team have funded 68 biotech startups, including companies building the post-animal bioeconomy: The EVERY Company, Memphis Meats, Gelzen, New Wave, and Pembient. He's also an advisor of The Good Food Institute.

== Education ==
Bethencourt has a BSc degree in Biological Sciences (Molecular Genetics) from Warwick University in the United Kingdom. He also has a Masters in Bioscience Enterprise (MBE) from Cambridge University (2002 – 2003). This masters course was the first of its kind in the UK (launched in 2002) and it was a fusion of the MBA/Biotech courses and launched in partnership with Harvard and MIT. He has also been a Doctor of Philosophy (PhD) Candidate at the Center for Regenerative Medicine at the University of Edinburgh in 2003 working on stem cell differentiation. .

== Companies invested and co-founded ==
- NERD Skincare
- Gelzen
- V-Sense Medical
- Memphis Meats
- Vali Nanomedical
- INDEE
- Truust
- Koniku
- Girihlet
- MYi
- Circularis
- New Wave Foods
- Amino BioLabs
- Gene and Cell Technologies
- MeliBio

Advised:

- Berkeley ultrasound

Co Founded:

- Sudo Room
- Counter Culture Labs
- Berkeley Biolabs
- LAbLaunch
- IndieBIo
- Wild Earth

== Global Forum 2015 ==
Bethencourt joined the Global Forum 2015 as one of the speakers. The Global Forum on Research and Innovation for Health 2015, aimed to identify solutions to the world’s unmet health needs through research and innovation. The said forum was held on August 24–27, 2015 at Philippines International Convention Center(PICC), Metro Manila, Philippines. Bethencourt spoke about the topic of "Increasing public expenditure on research and innovation in emerging economies" and "Increasing investments for innovative andpractical solutions to priority healthcare".

== Pioneers Asia 2016 ==
Bethencourt was a part of Pioneers Asia 2016 on Mar 23, 2016 at Tokyo, Japan. Pioneers facilitates profound business relationships between tech innovators. The event was for tech entrepreneurs, investors, top executives, thought-leaders, and international media from Europe to Asia, Middle East, and beyond. Bethencourt spoke about BIOTECH FOR THE WORLD OF THE FUTURE. He also moderated the life sciences and agriculture topic on the said event.
