= European Vegetarian Union =

Voluntary association

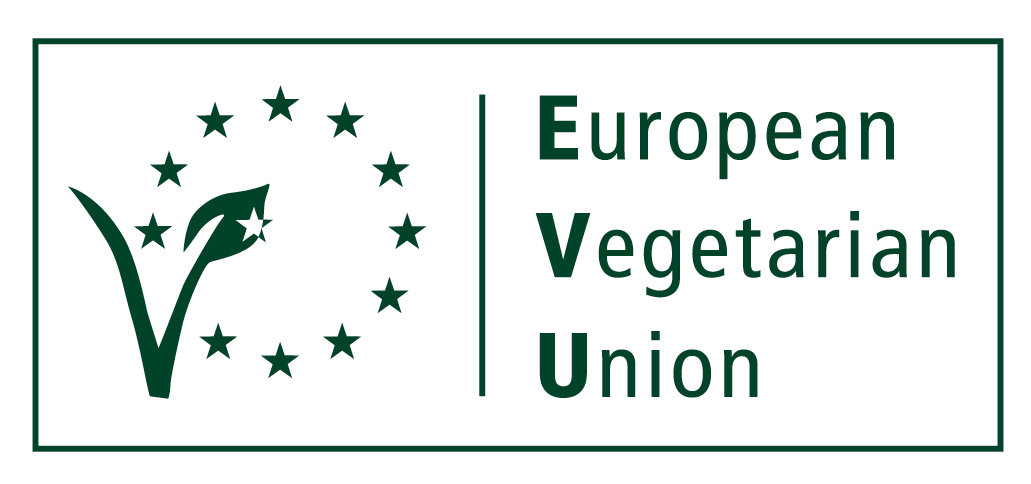
- Abbreviation: EVU
- Formation: 1988; 38 years ago
- Founded at: Hilversum, Netherlands
- Type: Non-profit organisation
- Registration no.: 109356110578-03
- Purpose: Vegetarianism/Veganism
- Location: Brussels, Berlin, Vienna
- Region served: Europe
- Members: 43 member organisations from 28 countries (2020)
- Official language: English
- General Secretary: Louise Johansen
- President: Felix Hnat
- Vice President: Sebastian Joy
- Treasurer: Johannes Gilli
- Affiliations: International Vegetarian Union; European Alliance for Plant-based Foods
- Budget: (2017)
- Website: euroveg.eu

V-label
- Effective since: 1995
- Product category: Food label
- Legal status: Consumer recognised

The European Vegetarian Union (EVU) is a non-profit, non-governmental umbrella organisation for vegan and vegetarian societies and groups in Europe. The union works in the areas of vegetarianism, nutrition, health, consumer protection, climate and environment, and food labelling. The current General Secretary is Louise Johansen from Denmark, who is also working as a policy advisor and programme director at the Vegetarian Society of Denmark (DVF).

== History ==
- The EVU distributed the 1995 film Devour the Earth about the global consequences of meat consumption. The film was produced by the Vegetarian Society, written by Tony Wardle and narrated by Paul McCartney.
- In October 2011, Renato Pichler, Board Member of the EVU, reported that the French government's Décret 2011-1227 and associated Arrêté (September 30, 2011) effectively outlaws the serving of vegan meals at any public or private school in France. Similar decrees are proposed for kindergartens, hospitals, prisons and retirement homes.

== Purpose ==
The main activities of the EVU are:

- To support and represent member societies on a European level, and to offer a platform for close cooperation;
- To raise public awareness of, and promote vegetarianism, vegetarian/plant-based issues and the benefits of a vegetarian/plant-based lifestyle;
- To lobby governments, European institutions and organisations for greater recognition of plant-based issues in policy decisions; and
- To promote transparent food labelling in the interest of all vegetarian and vegan consumers across Europe and the rest of the world.

== Labelling ==
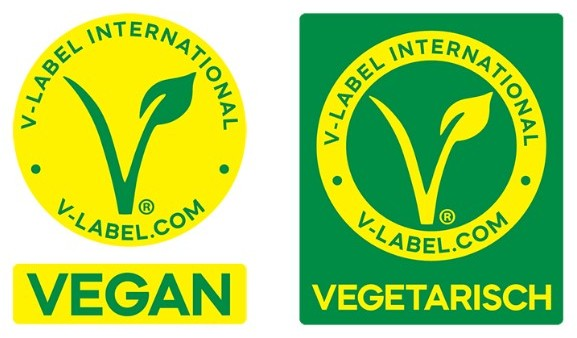
The V-Label since January 2023 (Vegan on L, Vegetarian on R)

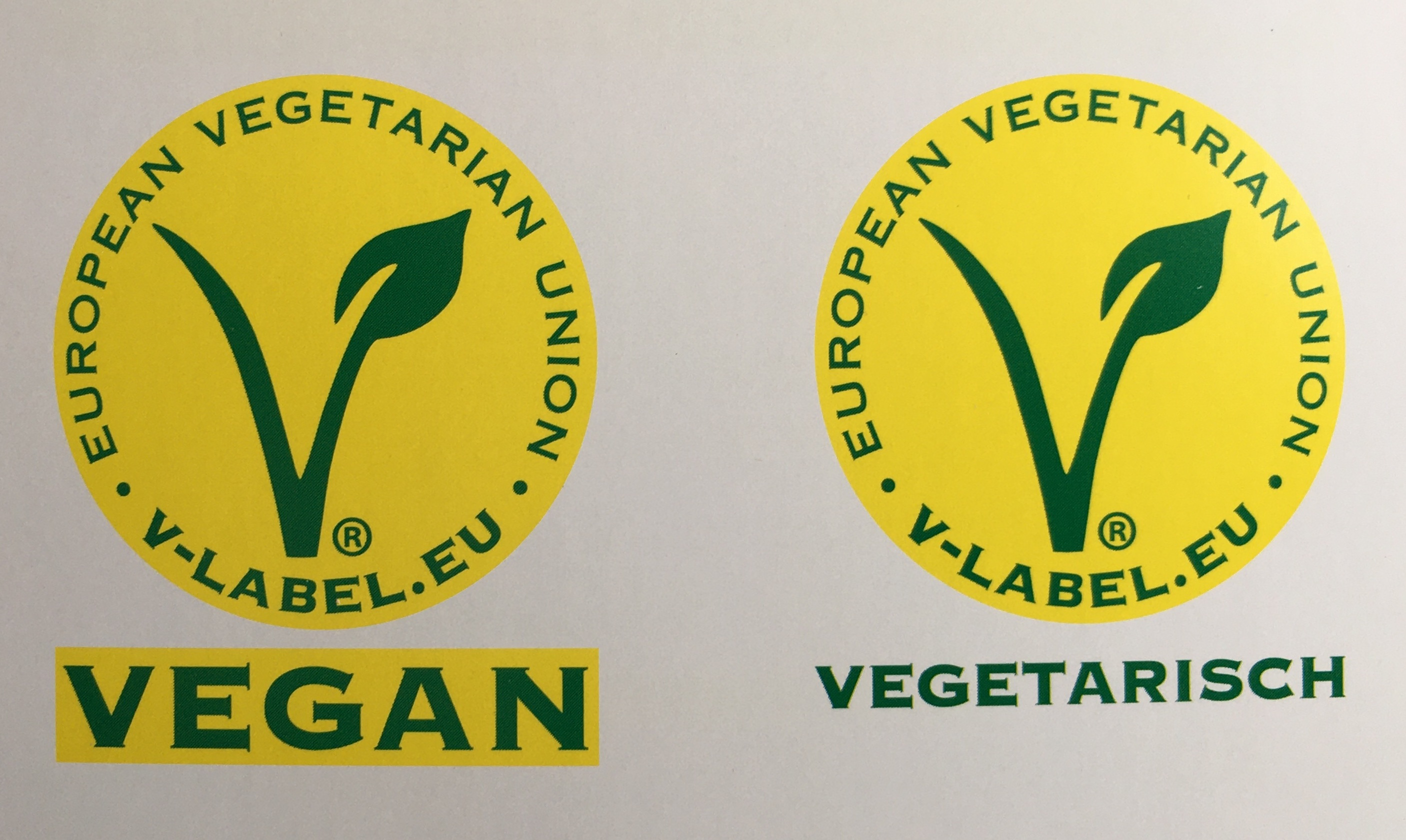
V-Label from 1995 until 2022 (Vegan on L, Vegetarian on R)

=== V-Label ===
EVU has acted as the background organisation for the V-Label in the past. Some of EVU's member organisations certify products with the label. The label was launched in 1995 and redesigned in 2023 to better differentiate between the vegan and the vegetarian label.

=== Other labels in the European Union ===
The European Vegetarian Union has tried to legally define the use of the labels "vegetarian" and "vegan" on food items. They have argued that the vegan label on a product should have a clear and standard meaning. They have put forth two main requirements:

1. "The deliberate use of non-vegan or non-vegetarian substances must be ruled out."
2. "The (potential) presence of inadvertent traces of non-vegan or non-vegetarian substances should not be an obstacle to labelling a product as vegan or vegetarian, provided that such contamination occurs despite a careful production process that complies with the best practices and the state of the art."

Despite the organisation's efforts, the European Commission initially refused to enact any changes. The EVU has continued to lobby state governments, especially in Germany because the country experienced more widespread support for the labelling legislation. As a result, "consumer protection ministers of German Länder unanimously agreed on a proposal for a wording of the definition of the terms "vegan" and "vegetarian" for food labelling and put it into effect for the food control authorities within their jurisdictions, making it de facto binding."

== See also ==
- List of vegetarian and vegan organisations
- The Vegan Society (United Kingdom)
- Vegetarian Society (United Kingdom)
- Vegetarian and vegan symbolism

=== Animal protection movements ===
- Human Environment Animal Protection Party (Tierschutzpartei)
- Viva!
