= Norbest =

American turkey product company

Norbest, LLC
- Type: Private
- Industry: Food
- Founded: 1926
- Headquarters: Moroni, Utah, United States
- Products: Turkey
- Number of employees: 200–500
- Website: http://www.norbest.com/

Norbest LLC is a Utah-based company producing and selling turkeys and turkey products.

The company was acquired by Pitman Family Farms in 2018.

== History ==
Norbest began in the early 1920s as a producer-owned marketing cooperative called Utah Poultry. In 1930, Utah Poultry, along with other related businesses from Utah, Washington, Oregon, Idaho, Montana, Colorado, and Nevada, combined to form the first regional turkey marketing co-op in the United States. Its headquarters were established in Salt Lake City, Utah, on October 9, 1930. The new cooperative was known as the Northwestern Turkey Growers Association.

The objectives of the new association were to "produce and pack a higher grade of birds, to establish a known quality…to eliminate as much speculation as possible...and pack a product, using federal grades, of uniform standard quality that will command both respect and the confidence of buyers." In its first year of operations, the co-op had revenues of $1 million on 3.5 million pounds of product; 125 million pounds are produced annually by Norbest today.

The Northwestern Turkey Growers Association was among the first to adopt federal grading standards. Throughout its second year of operation, Northwestern received a "Number One" grade, which proved to be a significant marketing advantage. Ever since, the co-op has adhered to the highest government and industry standards of quality. Today, all Norbest-branded whole birds are USDA Grade A — the highest grade possible.

A familiar trademark was needed to help consumers recognize the new co-op's products. Someone suggested "Norwest", short for Northwestern Turkey Growers Association. This was soon changed to "Norbest". The new brand proved so popular that after a few years, the cooperative changed its name to "Norbest Turkey Growers Association", and later to Norbest, Inc.

Despite the Great Depression, Norbest stepped up promotional efforts. In 1936, Norbest hit a publicity jackpot with the presentation of a large turkey to President Franklin D. Roosevelt just before Thanksgiving. This holiday tradition continues today through annual presentations by the National Turkey Federation.

During World War II, turkey became a mainstay of U.S. troops serving both at home and abroad. Norbest earned the Armed Forces Meritorious Services Award for Outstanding Performance in supplying the Quartermaster Corps.

After the war, domestic demand for turkey lagged behind the production capacity built to cover wartime needs. Norbest researchers set about to improve the appeal of turkey as an everyday menu item. Norbest became an industry leader in improvements in breeding, growing, processing, and marketing of turkeys. It was the first marketing group to sell fully eviscerated, ready-to-cook turkeys. (Prior to this time, turkeys were sold "New York dressed", with the head, feet, and viscera still intact.)

During the following years, the whole-bird business expanded, as did marketing of bone-in breasts and parts. Based on successful wartime experience, an international expansion occurred, leading to the awarding in 1964 of the President's "E" award for excellence in exporting.

Recognizing the homemaker's need for more convenient products, Norbest again became the leader in new product development in the 1960s and 1970s. Norbest was first with the Tender-Timer pop-up cooking gauge that pops its stem at precisely the time the turkey is done. Norbest also led the way with basted turkeys and bone-in breasts, and with boneless roasts and other products.

The company was purchased by Pitman Farms, which is supplier for Whole Foods Market.

== Animal abuse allegations ==
In 2018, five activists from Direct Action Everywhere, including director Wayne Hsiung, entered a farm in Moroni, Utah that supplies turkeys to Norbest. The case was publicized by journalist Glenn Greenwald, among others. The activists found and recorded images of turkeys suffering from diseases, open wounds, and infections, and shared these images with The Salt Lake Tribune. The activists were charged with unlawful entry by prosecutors in Sanpete County, Utah.

Matthew Cook, President and CEO of Norbest, expressed "deep disappointment" at the state of the facility shown in the activists' video, and said it had already been flagged by Norbest for violations. Cook also claimed some of the allegations were inaccurate, including that the turkeys were infected with hepatitis.

Three of the defendants plead guilty to reduced misdemeanor charges, while two others planned on going to trial and arguing their acts were protected free speech. In 2021, attorneys for the remaining two defendants indicated they planned to accept plea deals.

== Today ==
Other product line extensions have followed over the years. Today, Norbest offers a full line of raw and cooked further-processed products including bone-in breasts and boneless roasts for both retail and foodservice; ground turkey; turkey steaks; cooked, roasted, and smoked deli breasts; turkey ham; and a host of other products. Norbest products are sold throughout the United States, as well as in Pacific Rim countries, Mexico, the Caribbean, and the Middle East. Membership in the Norbest cooperative has changed a few times over the 69 years of its existence, as local farmer co-ops have merged, dissolved, or changed focus.
