= Life According to Ohad =

- החיים על פי אוהד
- Directed by: Eri Daniel Erlich
- Written by: Eri Daniel Erlich
- Starring: Ohad Cohen
- Production company: Daroma Productions
- Release date: 12 May 2014
- Running time: 80 minutes
- Country: Israel
- Language: Hebrew

Life According to Ohad (Hebrew: החיים על פי אוהד Hachaim al pi Ohad) is a 2014 Israeli biographical documentary about a vegan animal-rights activist named Ohad Cohen. The film highlights Ohad's struggle to reconnect with his family after separating from them for years due to their carnist lifestyle. Eri Daniel Erlich, writer and director, traveled alongside Ohad for three years to capture this documentary in which Ohad undertakes open rescue, chains himself to animal cages in protest, and performs public demonstrations in favor of animal rights. The film was awarded a Special Jury Mention by Docaviv in 2014. The website claims that 25% of profits made by the film are donated to promote research of cultured meat.

== Background ==
Eri Erlich met Ohad Cohen 15 years prior to filming the documentary. Erlich moved to Tel Aviv, Israel to join an animal rights organization where he met Ohad, and felt an immediate connection to him. Feeling they weren't achieving enough with the organization, the duo planned to burn down a factory farm together. Realizing that such a large undertaking be too difficult for novices, they instead decided to vandalize local McDonald's restaurants and butcher shops. After some time, the two felt that they needed more activists to join their cause, so they began doing local vegan outreach. Erlich felt that showing people videos was an effective form of outreach, so he studied film and video editing while Ohad continued doing fieldwork. This eventually lead to the creation of the film.

== Plot ==
The film begins with Ohad retreating from a balcony overlooking the noisy streets of Israel into his apartment where he places a phone call to his mother. Ohad reveals to his mother that he'd written a 28-page letter for her and his father to read, asking that they give serious consideration to the letter. His mother accepts, but explains that she is unhappy with Ohad's distance from the family. Upon ending the call, Ohad tells the camera that he misses his mother too, but could not bring himself to reciprocate the words to her.

Ohad visits his parents, who having read the letter, have a discussion with him. They oppose the tone of his letter and feel that he has slandered them. His father rejects the philosophy that all animals should be treated equally, saying that humans are superior beings, therefore unequal treatment of animals is justified. As Ohad's father rants, tension begins to rise. Ohad explains that similar arguments have been made to hurt others throughout history, and that people must empathize with animals and speak out for them. After some exchanges, Ohad becomes outraged, cursing at this father and storming out of the apartment.

Ohad is next shown doing vegan outreach in the city, educating passersby on the injustice of animal use. He and several others then travel to a facility where they rescue injured baby chicks from a dumpster outside the facility. The police and property owner arrive on the scene and the group get into a heated exchange, Ohad's group eventually leaving with a large cardboard box of chicks in their hands. Upset, the group agree that the chicks will likely not survive.

Ohad, his parents, and his two siblings share a vegan dinner together. He tells that he wants them to become more moral, comparing the atrocities that Nazi Germany inflicted upon the Jews to the atrocities humans inflict upon animals. As Jews who have been affected by the holocaust, Ohad says his parents are hypocrites for enabling the exploitation of animals.

Stepping into a slaughterhouse, Ohad photographs the bodies of dead cows, skinned and hung by their feet. At his next family dinner, Ohad's sister argues that Ohad will regret the distance he has put between himself and his family. Through tears, Ohad laments that his two lives seem irreconcilable. His father embraces him and his mother cries that she just wants him to be a part of their lives. At another slaughterhouse, Ohad films as turkeys are slaughtered and piled into a bloody bin. Blood spurts into Ohad's face.

At night, Ohad and some companions enter to a slaughterhouse and rescue chickens which they load into their van. During their escape they fear that someone is following them, but it turns out to be a false alarm; their friend Tal. After bringing the chickens to safety, Ohad converses with his friend about his regrets of being a former meat-eater. She tells him that line of thinking is "idiotic", and that she wishes he'd explained veganism to her sooner than he did.

In private, Ohad reveals to the camera that he is fond of the girl, but he doesn't know how to act. He says that he feels like he's failed in every aspect of his life except for in his defense of animals.

At his next family dinner, Ohad tells his family about the chickens he helped rescue. They respond negatively, criticizing him for breaking the law and committing theft. Ohad argues that one cannot steal a slave. Ohad and his brother argue about legality versus morality in terms of their merits and shortcomings.

In a dramatic public demonstration, Ohad (and several others) protest animal agriculture by being held down and branded as Ohad's parents and passersby look on. Ohad screams in pain as the hot brand touches his chest, and his mother cries. Next, demonstrators take away the baby of a woman activist and rip her shirt open, squeezing a milk pump against her breast in protest of the dairy industry.

In his final family dinner of the film, Ohad's brother argues that vegans are not ethical because they may accidentally step on insects, and because harvesting crops results in the death of some rodents. Ohad explains that while he is not perfect, that does not excuse people from murdering cows.

Before sunrise, Ohad and his peers block a truck that is taking caged animals to slaughter. Ohad steps onto the back of the truck and chains his neck to the cages, refusing to leave. The activists remain until after sunrise, until eventually Ohad is cut loose and the truck must return to its original location to due legalities about keeping farmed animals exposed for a long period of time. The film ends with Ohad and his love-interest curled up together outside the scene, falling asleep.

== Cast ==
- Aviva Cohen
- Uzi Cohen
- Itay Cohen
- Shirly Cohen Liany
- Sharon Cohen
