= Direct Action Everywhere =

Animal rights organization

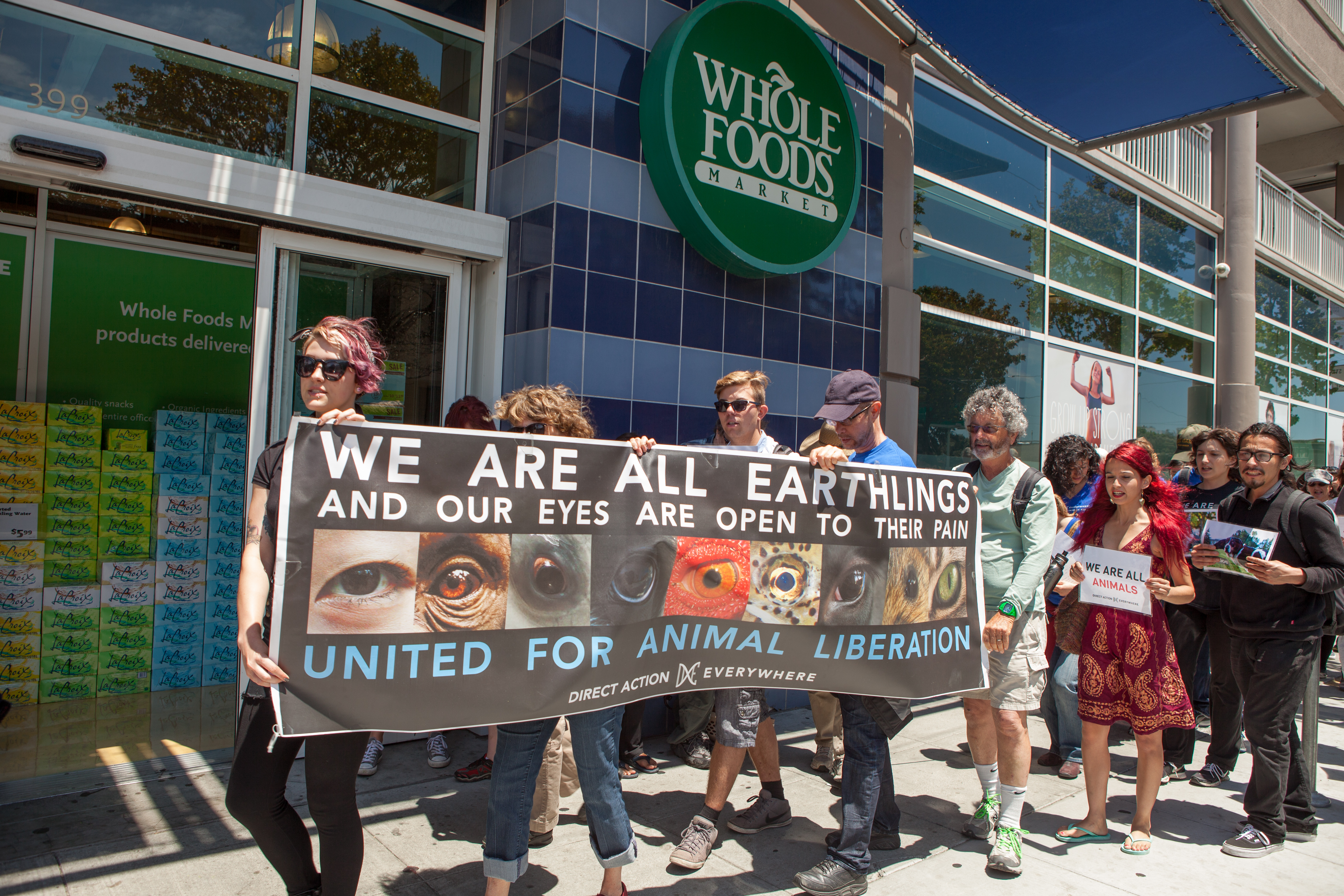
- DxE protest at a Whole Foods Market in San Francisco, July 2015
- Abbreviation: DxE
- Founded: 2013
- Founders: Wayne Hsiung
- Purpose: Animal rights
- Headquarters: Berkeley, California, United States
- Website: www.directactioneverywhere.com

Direct Action Everywhere (DxE) is an international grassroots network of animal rights activists founded in 2013 in the San Francisco Bay Area. DxE uses disruptive protests and non-violent direct action tactics, such as open rescue of animals from factory farms. Their intent is to build a movement that can eventually shift culture and change social and political institutions. DxE activists work to "put an end to the commodity status of animals."

== History ==
=== Founding ===
DxE was founded in 2013 in the United States by a handful of people in the San Francisco Bay Area who decided to protest inside restaurants and stores, rather than outside, which was more typical of animal rights protests. DxE co-founder Wayne Hsiung investigated slaughterhouses for ten years prior to founding DxE with the goal of scaling up open rescue and other forms of non-violent direct action.

DxE's first action occurred in January 2013. Six activists demonstrated in front of a meat counter at a Sprouts Farmers Market, contending that the items being sold there behind the counter were not food but "the torment and suffering of billions of our friends in factory farms and slaughterhouses."

=== Growth ===
DxE continued organizing protests inside restaurants and stores, citing the Southern Christian Leadership Conference and ACT UP as influences. In August 2013, DxE activists organized the Los Angeles side of an international multi-city protest, The Earthlings March. Approximately 40 cities and varied activist groups participated in the march.

In October 2013, in response to a viral video produced by Chipotle called The Scarecrow, DxE organized in-store "die-ins" at three San Francisco Chipotle restaurants. DxE argued that the ad, which advertised Chipotle's purported efforts to create a more natural and humane food system was "humanewashing", which animal rights activists describe as marketing efforts intended to disguise the inherent violence of using and killing animals for food. Within a few weeks, similar demonstrations were executed in Chicago, Los Angeles, Phoenix and Philadelphia. DxE responded by creating a platform for coordinated global days of action under the "It's Not Food, It's Violence" message.

DxE has continued with internationally coordinated monthly days of action. In addition to Chipotle, activists have also targeted other grocery stores, restaurants, clothing stores, zoos, circuses, and labs. The original actions were organized around the San Francisco Bay Area. By December 2014, DxE's network had grown to at least 90 cities in 20 countries.

DxE hosts an annual Animal Liberation Conference (ALC) for grassroots, peaceful animal rights activists. The ALC is a full week of talks, trainings, and socials all aimed at empowering activists.

=== Whole Foods campaign ===
DxE selected U.S.-based natural foods grocery store Whole Foods Market as the target of the investigation because the company is allegedly "actively shaping the public's view of animal agriculture with false marketing."

The activists selected Certified Humane Whole Foods egg supplier Petaluma Farms in Petaluma, California, as the target of the initial investigation. At one point, activists encountered a diseased hen who had collapsed and was struggling to breathe and removed her from the farm. They named her Mei Hua (Chinese for "beautiful flower") and made her recovery a centerpiece of the ensuing campaign and imagery. Another farm owned by the same company was later the subject of a similar video filmed by a former employee. When asked for comment about that particular break-in after DxE's release of their initial video, the Sonoma County Sheriff's Department stated that a full investigation was underway, but that the farm appeared to be performing at "industry standards".

DxE released a 19-minute video of the investigation, "Truth Matters", on YouTube and Facebook in January 2015 and received coverage in several international media outlets, including The New York Times and Mother Jones. For several weekends following the investigation, and every month thereafter through early 2016, DxE chapters in several dozen cities organized protests inside Whole Foods stores, challenging the company's "Values Matter" advertising campaign. Whole Foods announced new egg-laying standards shortly after the release of the investigation video.

Over the course of 2015, a larger team of activists investigated Diestel Turkey Ranch, one of only three companies, out of over 2,000, to achieve a 5+ rating on the 1–5 scale used by the Global Animal Partnership, Whole Foods's animal welfare rating scheme. Activists recorded video reportedly at a Diestel-owned farm in Jamestown, California, showing filth, overcrowding, and birds dying as infants.

DxE released another investigation in November 2016 into Jaindl Farms, a Whole Foods farm that has supplied the White House with Thanksgiving turkeys since the 1960s rated in the 98th percentile of animal welfare according to an animal welfare audit. The activists released footage of birds with mutilated beaks, struggling to walk, and crowded to the point of repeated trampling. The video footage from the farm that DxE released shows birds with mangled beaks, broken legs, missing eyes, open sores and facial lesions. In one scene, turkeys peck and nibble at a young bird's festering wound. In another, a decaying carcass rests on the floor among live animals. Two Huffington Post reporters visited the farm on invitation of Jaindl's owner and found that while severe injuries were uncommon, some turkeys had visible sores. In response to DxE's video, the group was accused of ecoterrorism by Jaindl's legal counsel in a letter to Wayne Hsiung, who also stated "This criminal activity fostered by your organization is reprehensible, and cannot be overlooked."

On May 29, 2018, several hundred DxE activists held a protest outside Cal Eggs Farm in Petaluma, California, which is a supplier to Whole Foods. Some of the activists entered a barn and carried out live and diseased birds. 40 of the activists were arrested for misdemeanor trespassing. DxE activists see "open rescue" as establishing "the right to rescue" animals legally in the future.

After numerous protests inside the Whole Foods store in Berkeley, California, Whole Foods obtained a restraining order against DxE activists in September 2018, prohibiting Wayne Hsiung and 150 other unnamed DxE activists from entering that particular store or its parking lot.

=== Liberation Pledge ===
In November 2015, DxE became one of the most visible backers of a new action known as the "Liberation Pledge", with co-founder Wayne Hsiung authoring a piece in the Huffington Post announcing the pledge. According to the website liberationpledge.com, it is defined by the following three points:

One: Publicly refuse to eat animals—live vegan.

Two: Publicly refuse to sit where people are eating animals.

Three: Encourage others to take the pledge.

The pledge was considered controversial upon release, including criticisms regarding food justice concerns and by potentially isolating vegans who take the pledge. Several prominent figures in the animal rights movement, including Anita Krajnc of the Toronto Pig Save and Keith McHenry of Food Not Bombs took the pledge, with McHenry declaring, "We must stop the eating of animals." Wanyama Box creator Nzinga Young defended the Liberation Pledge, writing, "when I spend time in safe spaces with sacred people, I don't want to see carnage."

=== Costco campaign ===
Following the Farmer John investigation, DxE activists repeatedly interrupted LA Dodgers baseball games to protest the team's touting of Farmer John's "Dodger Dogs" hot dogs. Activists in LA, Colorado, and the San Francisco Bay Area jumped on the field during plays at several games with banners declaring "Dodgers Torture Animals" and "Animal Liberation Now". The activists tied their protests to Farmer John, protesting the promotion of "torture and death of animals".

DxE followed up its Farmer John investigation by investigating a cage-free egg supplier to Costco. Costco had been a key leader in the 2016 trend of food companies committing to shift to a cage-free egg supply, but, according to DxE, the investigation raised questions about the state of animal welfare after that shift. DxE released a video that shows dead birds on the floor and injured hens pecked by other chickens. One bird had a piece of flesh hanging off its beak. In response to the video released by DxE, the supplier claimed that the activists had committed a "break-in and trespassing" and that "The video does not show what truly goes on in our barns and appears to be staged for production effect". The group did not seek permission to enter the farm, Lead Organizer Wayne Hsiung said, but he argued that the group had not broken any laws because they had suspected animal cruelty and that gave them a right to enter the property. All birds inside the farm were destroyed due to the contamination risk the activists had introduced into the farm, according to the supplier. The two DxE organizers who conducted the investigation were initially charged with felony commercial burglary and subsequently pleaded no-contest to a reduced charge of trespass. The defendants were then ordered to pay restitution of $331,991 to compensate the farm owner based on his assertion that he was forced to slaughter all chickens in the barn. The defendants claim that the "depopulated" chickens were in a barn they never entered.

Direct Action Everywhere staged a protest at the SoMa location of Costco in San Francisco. Direct Action Everywhere activists forcibly occupied the store's meat section and held a "die-in" near an entrance that involved activists covering each other with fake blood and pretending to eat each other. The protest involved Costco suppliers' controversial treatment of hens. Activists from the organization claimed that many of the "cage-free" farms were housing the chickens in crowded cages and violating principles dictated by the "certified humane" label. They released undercover footage of the farms showing the poor conditions. Another protest was held at a Costco store in New Berlin, Wisconsin.

=== Open rescue expansion ===
In December 2016, DxE open rescue projects began expanding beyond the Bay Area when members in Toronto released an investigation of a pig farm. The project was followed up by an internationally coordinated rescue with animal advocates in Sweden, Germany, and Australia. In April 2017, DxE activists in Colorado conducted an investigation of Morning Fresh Farms, a cage-free chicken egg supplier.

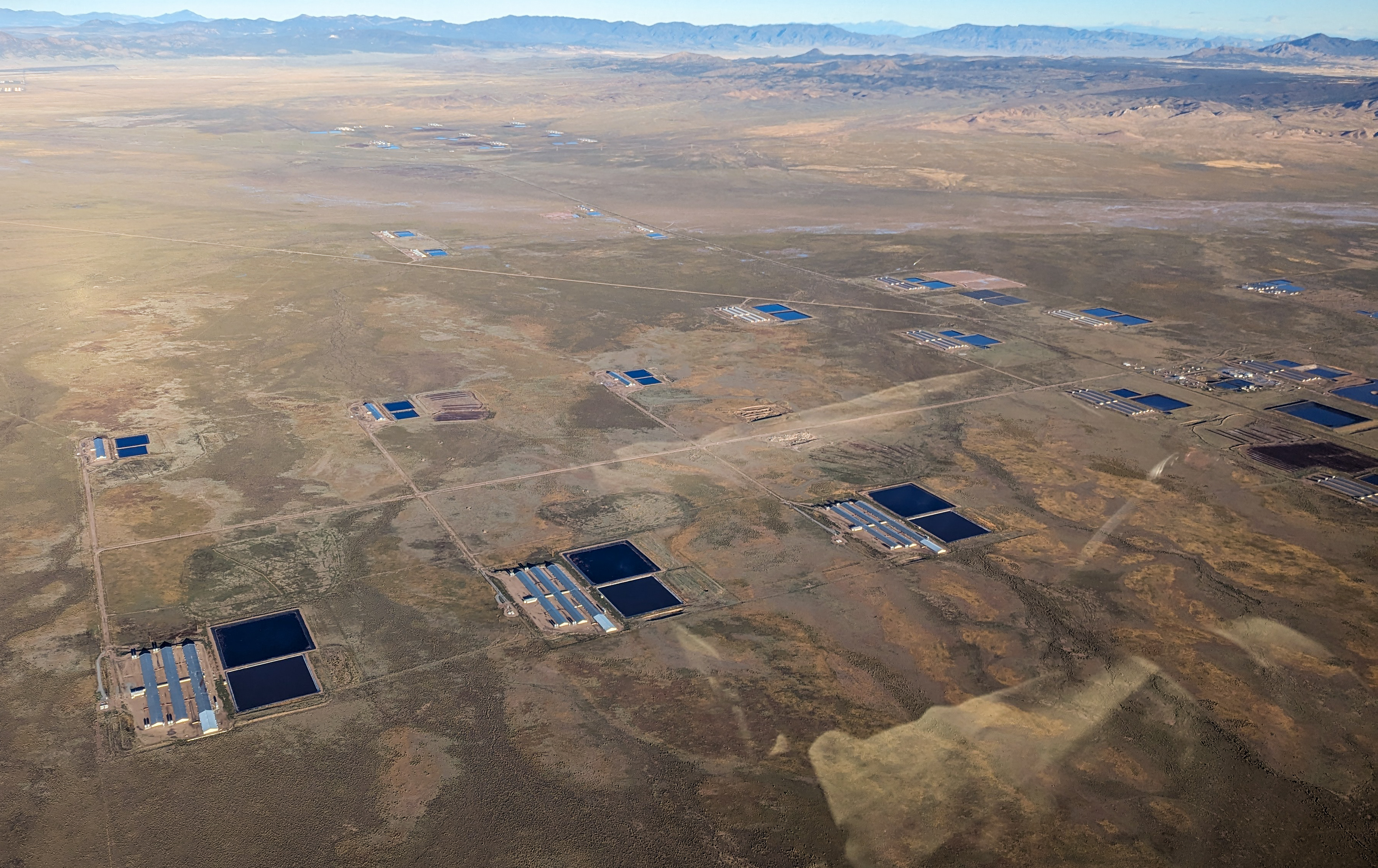
Smithfield/Circle Four pig farms in the Utah desert.

In 2017, activists with DxE entered Smithfield Foods-owned Circle Four Farms in Utah and performed an open rescue of two piglets subsequently named Lily and Lizzie. Their rescue triggered an extensive multi-state FBI hunt for the two baby piglets. DxE released a virtual-reality video that takes viewers into barns at Circle Four Farms and shows sows with bloody and mangled teats; pregnant sows gnawing on the bars of the narrow stalls they live in until they give birth; and piglets clambering over and nibbling dead siblings. A video taken by DxE that coincided with the open rescue at Circle Four Farms has been called inaccurate by a spokesman for Smithfield; the video purports to show mistreatment and abuse of animals at Circle Four Farms. In November the same year, a group of DxE activists, which included actress Alexandra Paul, claimed to expose animal cruelty and neglect at Zonneveld Dairy, a Land O'Lakes dairy supplier based in California, which included "young calves living in filthy hutches, unprotected from record low and high temperatures between 19 and 110 degrees Fahrenheit, suffering from pneumonia, diarrhea, open sores, maggot infestations, and infections." The team of activists performed an open rescue on one sick calf, later named Roselynn.

In September, 2017 DxE organizers attended a small-scale poultry processing class at Long Shadow Farm, a 6-acre farm in Berthoud, Colorado specializing in pasture-raised chickens. The facility raises animals and offers "poultry processing services". Led by DxE Organizer Aidan Cook, under the name of "Denver Baby Animal Save" the group entered the property masquerading as volunteers and took three chickens, after asking to hold some of the birds and being assisted in doing so by the farm owners' eight-year-old daughter. Opinions on the actions vary, with DxE organizers and members claiming to have "rescued" the birds, while the farm owners considered it "theft". A DxE spokesperson stated that "even if the animal rights group could have saved more chickens by purchasing them, the group opposes buying into a system that hurts animals." The DxE organizers who conducted the "open rescue" responded to an inquiry by the farm owner, "We have taken your birds to a sanctuary, where they can be free." Two of the chickens that were taken were carriers of mycoplasma, a highly infectious respiratory disease in poultry. The Larimer County Sheriff's Office investigated several felony allegations including trespassing, attempted theft of livestock and theft of livestock.

In May 2018, a Utah prosecutor filed felony charges against six DxE activists stemming from an undercover investigation into conditions on a turkey farm in Moroni, Utah which serves as a supplier for Norbest. The DxE investigation found "tens of thousands of turkeys crammed inside filthy industrial barns, virtually on top of one another." The activists rescued three turkeys suffering from disease or injuries and were on the brink of death. The charges include two felony theft charges that carry possible prison terms of five years each. In October 2018 the verdict of the judge was to allow 3 of the defendants to perform community service in lieu of further punishment if they plead guilty to misdemeanors. However, Wayne Hsiung and Paul Darwin Picklesimer will have to go through an additional trial to determine the final verdict.

In April 2019, DxE activists broke into a Smithfield Foods farm in North Carolina to expose overcrowding and unsanitary conditions there, and the extensive use of antibiotics. In addition to acquiring footage of scores of sick piglets and refrigerators full of powerful antibiotics, the group took a 6-week-old female pig, subsequently named Lauri, and rushed her to a vet. Testing revealed Lauri suffered from pneumonia, anemia and an antibiotic-resistant staph infection. She now resides at an animal sanctuary. Hsiung, who was involved in the raid on the farm, told The New York Times "Americans have a fundamental right to know how their food is being produced, but right now, the only way to gather this information is to break the law." Responding to an inquiry from The Times, Smithfield leveled accusations that the group has a history of manipulating footage in order to "mislead the public and gain attention for its activist agenda which includes 'total animal liberation.'"

In May 2020 DxE obtained and released video footage of the ventilation shutdown (VSD) method used to kill pigs at an Iowa Select Farms facility. According to a whistleblower who was an employee at Iowa Select Farms, the pigs died very slowly from overheating and suffocation when the ventilation system was shut off. Matt Johnson, the activist who entered the facilities to obtain VSD footage, removed a piglet from one facility to perform an "open rescue" of the animal. Charges against Johnson for these activities were dropped in January 2021 when Iowa Select Farms decided not to testify. Other, later charges against Johnson, also relating to activity at facilities owned by Iowa Select Farms, were also suddenly dropped in January 2022 after the defense subpoenaed executives and employees to testify. Johnson, who had hoped the cases would go to trial in order to challenge the constitutionality of ag-gag laws, stated "we are setting a precedent that rescuing animals from situations where they're in distress is the right thing to do. It's not a crime."

== Philosophy ==
=== "Humane fraud" ===
DxE has had an ongoing campaign against companies who make claims about selling food products made with "humane" standards of animal welfare. Targets of this campaign have included the supermarket Whole Foods Market, the restaurant chain Chipotle Mexican Grill, and several farms. Through its investigations, public statements and writings, protests, and livestock theft, DxE has alleged that such companies misrepresent the actual conditions on their farms or their suppliers' farms. DxE also maintains that it is not possible to raise and kill animals in a humane way.

The Director of Operations for Certified Humane, Mimi Stein, said in an email to The Washington Post that "DxE is attempting to undermine consumer confidence in products which are in fact ethically produced and businesses working in good faith to reinvigorate a very desirable traditional business model...Shame on DxE!"

=== Social science ===
DxE's leaders include a number of students of social science, and DxE organizers aim to use social science in persuading others to join their protests and self-proclaimed rescues. DxE has published articles on the evidence for nonviolent civil resistance based on the work of political scientist Erica Chenoweth, the importance of social ties based on the work of sociologist Doug McAdam, and the importance of mobilizing masses of ordinary people based on research by network scientist Duncan Watts.

=== Critical stance toward consumer veganism ===
Activists and writers associated with DxE have criticized the animal rights movement's contemporary focus on creating individual vegans and celebrating consumer products like vegan ice cream rather than focusing on activism and changing social and political institutions. DxE argues that the individual focus is less effective than trying to change institutions, since the individual focus does not lead people to do more once they stop using animals personally. Instead, DxE argues that activist groups should push people to take action so that the movement grows more quickly. Activists with DxE have argued that nonviolence is in principle a practice of anger toward systems and compassion toward individuals and that a protest movement will be more successful by focusing on governments, corporations, and other institutions rather than making individual consumers defensive by attacking them personally.

DxE's blog has argued that consumer vegan options also distract from the actual threat to animals, allowing companies that are hurting animals like Whole Foods to avoid criticism and leading animal rights activists not to take action against them. In a debate with Rutgers philosopher and animal rights theorist Gary Francione, DxE co-founder Wayne Hsiung stated that "activism, not veganism, is the moral baseline."

== Tactics ==
=== Open rescue ===
Wayne Hsiung cites as an inspiration for DxE the work of Patty Mark, an Australian animal rights activist and founder of Animal Liberation Victoria (ALV). ALV activists popularized the tactic of going into farms in the middle of the night without disguises and filming the conditions inside. The tactic stands in contrast to the more common form of investigation in the U.S. animal rights movement in which an investigator poses as a farm worker to film using a hidden camera. Open rescue activists emphasize that their approach allows the portrayal of individual animals' stories since activists can focus on animals in the farm, and to rescue animals who would otherwise die of disease and document their recovery. It also touts open rescue as a form of activism anyone can undertake, offering the possibility and goal of thousands of open rescue teams across the country.

DxE aims to establish a legal right to rescue inhumanely treated animals, on the basis of laws that allow bystanders to rescue animals in danger such as a dog in a hot car.

DxE has cited open rescues as particularly key to exposing "humane" companies that are generally smaller and more difficult to infiltrate. In April 2016, three members of DxE went undercover to Yulin, China, home of the Yulin dog meat festival, to document the upcoming preparations of the festival; they said they have been able to catch some of the brutality on camera at one of the largest slaughterhouses in the city. Two of the activists with DxE were able to smuggle out the video footage they had captured, along with three dogs bound for slaughter.

Open rescue has been criticized by one such smaller, "humane" company that has been the target of DxE's use of the tactic. Petaluma Farms, a distributor of eggs for Whole Foods, was investigated and the subject of a highly publicized campaign and open rescue by DxE. Jonathan Mahrt, an employee of Petaluma Farms and son of Petaluma Farms' owner Steven Mahrt, said, "My dad's take is that it's a sad day when farmers and ranchers have to be concerned about security."

On May 29, 2018, several hundred DxE demonstrators held a protest outside Cal Eggs Farm in Petaluma, California, and 40 of the activists entered a barn and carried out live and diseased birds. These 40 activists were arrested for misdemeanor trespassing. DxE activists believe that they have the legal right to rescue animals from farms in California described in state laws, and they want to establish this right in courts.

A major open rescue action was held on Saturday, September 29, 2018, at Petaluma Farms, the supplier to Amazon and Whole Foods, and the largest in the US. Several dying hens were removed from filthy, crowded sheds. One hen was allowed to leave with the activists and was sent to a sanctuary, however the rest were sent to animal control and did not survive. Petaluma sheriff's office reported that 67 activists were arrested at the scene. DxE counted it was 58 activists who were arrested. After release, activists protested against the arrests, as the activists believe that they had the right to the open rescue under California penal law code statue 597E, Doctrine of Necessity, which allows any person to enter a premises to provide food and or water to an animal which has not had either food or water for twelve hours or more. The activists are continuing to fight to be allowed to continue open rescues.

In May 2018, Hsiung and four others were charged in Utah with felonies for burglary, livestock theft, and engaging in "a pattern of illegal activity" and misdeameanor for engaging in a "riot". They were identified after posting high-quality video online of an open rescue of taking pigs from a Smithfield Foods facility in Beaver County, Utah. The defendants Wayne Hsiung and Paul Picklesimer were acquitted on all counts in October 2022.

In September 2021, DxE activists Alicia Santurio and Alexandra Paul participated in an open rescue when they took two severely ill chickens from a truck outside of a Foster Farms slaughterhouse in Livingston, California. Both were acquitted by a California jury in March 2023.

=== Mass protests ===
Inspired by both activist networks and street theater groups such as Improv Everywhere, DxE mobilizes masses of activists to creative protest in prominent public spaces. Early actions in DxE's history include a guerrilla poem, a "freeze" at a prominent mall, the disruption of a screening of American Meat with the stories and images of companion animals, and numerous other creative efforts.

Notable network-wide protests have included an effort in the summer of 2015 to incorporate dogs, cats, and other companion animals into protests as a symbol of human support, connections, and equality with animals. DxE also issued the #DisruptSpeciesism and #DogMeatPlease viral video challenges in September 2014 and 2015, respectively, which garnered social media fame when videos by DxE organizers Priya Sawhney, Kelly Atlas, and Jenny McQueen went viral.

In March 2018, DxE co-hosted a rally with Compassionate Bay in support of Supervisor Katy Tang of San Francisco leading the effort to ban the sale of fur in the city. Later that month, the board of supervisors of San Francisco voted unanimously to ban the sale of new fur.

Benny Johnson of the Independent Journal Review has called their protest tactics in Berkeley "bullying" in regards to graphic Berkeley protests in the summer of 2017.

=== Disruption of public events ===
Activists within the DxE network have undertaken a number of prominent disruptions of public figures. In August 2015, Iowa activist Matt Johnson asked New Jersey Governor Chris Christie about his veto of a widely supported bill banning gestation crates for mother pigs that the public widely regarded as cruel.

Johnson staged similar disruptions along the campaign trail, including at Iowa campaign events by Ohio Governor John Kasich and former U.S. President Bill Clinton and an appearance by former Hewlett-Packard CEO Carly Fiorina at the Iowa Pork Producers. Several activists from Iowa and Indiana also interrupted a Republican family values forum on the eve of Thanksgiving and the release of DxE's Diestel Turkey Ranch investigation video.

In January 2016, activists interrupted a speech by Pennsylvania Governor Tom Wolf at the 100th anniversary of the Pennsylvania Farm Show, saying that there was no reason to confine and kill pigs, chickens, and cows when it was not okay to do that to dogs or cats. DxE activist Zach Groff has stated that DxE aims to ensure that any event or public figure "promoting violence against animals" is the target of a protest interruption.

On December 23, 2020, Johnson was interviewed by Fox Business anchor Maria Bartiromo, where he posed as the CEO of meat packing company Smithfield Foods. He warned that its farms could be a "petri dish" for new diseases, and that the industry could be "effectively bringing on the next pandemic", citing a CDC report that three of every four infectious diseases originated from animals. On September 3, 2021, Johnson posed as Donnie D. King, the CEO of Tyson Foods, for an interview on Newsmax to discuss ventilation shutdown, saying:

It may be a little unorthodox of me to be saying this, quite frankly, but one of our main pork suppliers ... went with the most economic option available to them and they literally loaded thousands of pigs into industrial sheds. And they pumped in heat and steam, and they were really just roasting pigs alive.

In April 2022, DxE activists disrupted three Minnesota Timberwolves' playoff games when a demonstrator entered the court during live play. DxE said the protests were over alleged acts of animal cruelty by Rembrandt Enterprises farms, which like the Timberwolves NBA basketball team is also owned by Glen Taylor.

On September 8, 2022 during the National Football League's 2022 Kickoff Game at SoFi Stadium, two DxE activists ran onto the field carrying pink smoke bombs during the fourth quarter, disrupting play between the Los Angeles Rams and Buffalo Bills. The two protesters were bringing attention to a trial against Smithfield Foods regarding their factory farm practices. Less than a month later, during a Week 4 matchup against the Rams and San Francisco 49ers at Levi's Stadium, another DxE activist ran onto the field near the end of the first half, also carrying a pink smoke bomb and wearing a shirt similar to the two protesters from the previous incident. Rams linebacker Bobby Wagner and defensive end Takkarist McKinley tackled the intruding protester near the Rams' sideline before he was escorted off the field by security.

== Responses ==
Lauren-Elizabeth McGrath of vegan magazine Ecorazzi commented in 2016 that "They're an organization that is set on disrupting the day of the average meat-eater, but fails to help them beyond just that" and discussed accusations of racism within the organisation. Carol Adams, vegetarian-feminist and author of The Sexual Politics of Meat, announced on her blog that she intends to boycott events that host DxE speakers, stating that "DxE is both a counterproductive organization [for activism] as well as cult."

The Animal Agriculture Alliance, a group representing the United States agriculture industry, has spied on Direct Action Everywhere and worked to convince federal agencies that it and organizations like it are engaged in bioterrorism.

== See also ==
- List of animal rights groups
- Open rescue
- Hunt sabotage
- Veganism
