= Compassionate Action for Animals =

US nonprofit organization

Compassionate Action for Animals (CAA) is a Minneapolis-based animal advocacy non-profit focused on raising awareness on factory farming and promoting vegetarianism and veganism.

== History ==
CAA was formed in early 1998 in order to pursue "strategic nonviolence" as a path towards animal rights. This is a strategy based on the principles of non-violent action defined by Gene Sharp. These principles of strategic non-violence are reflected in CAA's current core values.

The name Compassionate Action for Animals was adopted in May 1998. In June 1999, CAA became a 501(c)3 non-profit organization after merging with the Animal Liberation League, another local animal rights organization with a very similar approach and philosophy.

In 1999, CAA began working on its Ban Battery Cages campaign, which culminated in the open rescue of over ten egg-laying hens from a battery cage facility, the first such rescue in the US. CAA's investigation and rescue campaign was based on a similar campaign which was first done by Animal Liberation Victoria in Australia.

CAA is active as a student group at the University of Minnesota, Twin Cities campus, as well as at the Macalester College campus and in the larger Minneapolis-Saint Paul area. Its focus is on outreach, education and community-building events.

== Activities and campaigns ==
- Outreach through tabling, leafleting, postering, pay-per-view video outreach, literature stands, writing letters and articles for publications, and more.
- Working with community restaurants and university cafeterias to make vegetarian and vegan dining more convenient and available.
- Organizing Twin Cities VegFest, an annual festival gathering together vegan and vegan-friendly vendors, animal advocacy organizations, speakers, cooking demos, and other programming.
- Organizing the Twin Cities Vegan Chef Challenge, a month-long restaurant contest where participants rate vegan dishes.
- Social events such as potlucks, movies, game nights and dine-outs.
- Food giveaways to show how delicious vegetarian and vegan food is.
- Hosting speakers who address animal, ethical and health issues

== Location ==
CAA has an office in the Sheridan Neighborhood at 34 13th Ave NE #108, Minneapolis, MN 55413.
