= Wayne Hsiung =

American activist

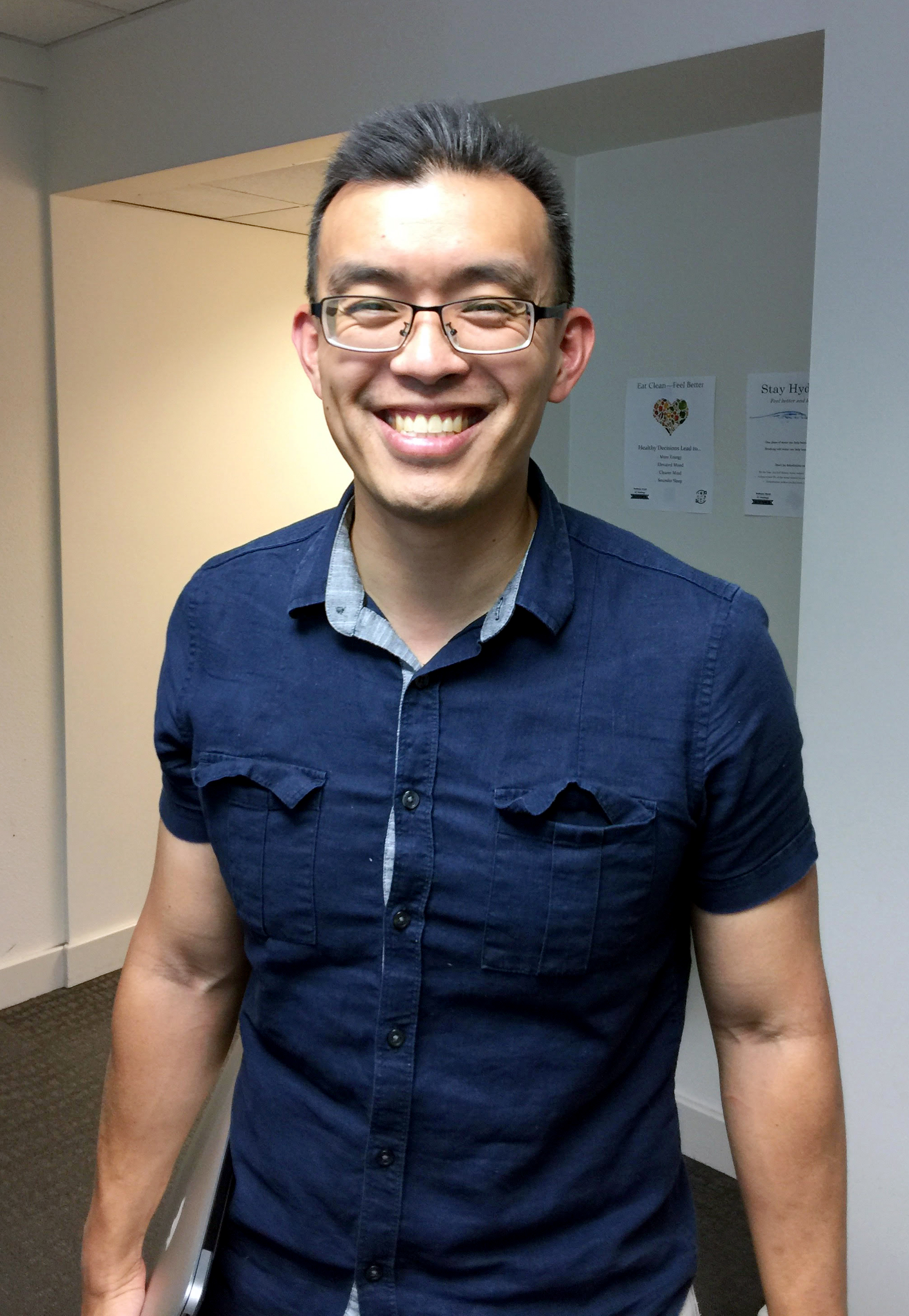
- Hsiung in 2017
- Born: June 18, 1981 (age 45)
- Education: University of Chicago (BA, JD)
- Occupations: Activist for animal rights and environmentalism, lawyer
- Spouse: Rose Patterson (m. 2025)

Wayne Hsiung (born June 18, 1981) is an American lawyer and animal rights activist. He is a co-founder of The Simple Heart Initiative and previously led the animal rights group Direct Action Everywhere (DxE), which he also co-founded. Hsiung ran for mayor of Berkeley, California, in 2020, largely focused on the issue of animal rights, and earned 24% of the vote, defeated by incumbent Jesse Arreguin.

== Early life and education ==
Hsiung's parents emigrated from Taiwan in the 1970s. His father did work involving vivisection for several years, which left a lasting impact on Hsiung and motivated him to become an animal rights activist. He also was influenced by Patty Mark, founder of Animal Liberation Victoria.

Hsiung attended DePauw University when he was 16, graduating from the University of Chicago in 2001 with a Bachelor's degree in political science. He received a National Science Foundation graduate fellowship to study economics at the Massachusetts Institute of Technology, but he went on leave after his first year to pursue a joint JD/PhD. He attended the University of Chicago Law School with a focus on behavioral law and economics.

== Career ==
=== Law ===
As a lawyer, Hsiung was involved in environmental activism and studied with legal scholar Eric Posner and economist Mark Duggan. He coauthored an analysis of the effect of climate change on nonhuman animals with behavioral law and economics scholar Cass Sunstein. He worked with the law firms DLA Piper and Steptoe & Johnson, was a Searle Fellow and visiting assistant professor at the Northwestern University School of Law. Hsiung was suspended by the California State Bar in March 2024, but reinstated in May.

=== Direct Action Everywhere ===
Hsiung co-founded Direct Action Everywhere, an animal rights group. In January 2015, Hsiung organized an "open rescue/investigation" on a certified humane egg farm in Petaluma, California. Hsiung and Direct Action Everywhere protesters climbed over a barbed wire fence to enter an egg farm and take video of alleged animal abuses such as confinement, preening from stress, and lack of water. In January 2015, DxE released a video narrated by Hsiung that showed him and other activists rescuing a hen. In the video there are birds with blisters and missing feathers. These hens were from a "cage-free" egg farm at Petaluma Farms, a major west-coast supplier to Whole Foods and Organic Valley. Hsiung, as the narrator, refers to the "stench," "filth," and "misery" around him. He shows several birds that appear to have blisters, missing feathers, and caked-on feces, though some birds have no visible health problems. The crew dramatically rescues one injured bird, handing her over the fence, one activist to another, and rushing her to a vet in Berkeley, who declares the bird to be in dismal shape.

In April 2016, Hsiung and two other members of DxE went to Yulin, China, the location of the Dog Meat Festival, to document the animal cruelty. Hsiung wrote that in one of the videos, dogs screamed as they were beaten to death. Hsiung and two other DxE activists removed three dogs from the facility. Hsiung says that he was beaten and arrested in China for the theft of the three dogs and held for two days.

In 2017, Hsiung, along with four other DxE activists, investigated a pig farm owned by Smithfield Foods in Utah and rescued two piglets from the facility. FBI agents were dispatched to look for these piglets and searched two animal sanctuaries in Utah and Colorado. Witnesses of the raids said the FBI agents sought DNA samples from pigs at the facilities as part of a search for the missing piglets. To obtain the DNA samples, the state veterinarians accompanying the FBI cut off close to two inches of a piglet's ear at one of the sanctuaries. Hsiung was indicted in Utah on multiple charges including felonies (burglary, livestock theft, and engaging in a pattern of illegal activity) and a misdemeanor riot charge relating to a break-in "investigation of animal cruelty" at this Smithfield Foods farm. Journalist Glenn Greenwald at The Intercept reported that the prosecution was politically motivated, as attorneys prosecuting the case had financial ties to Smithfield. Hsiung was offered resolution that involved no prison time, on the condition that he refrain from criticizing the company he had sought to expose; he and co-defendant Paul Picklesimer refused the offer. They were acquitted after trial in October 2022.

On April 24, 2018, Hsiung was arrested and charged with "threatening bodily injury" in Boulder, Colorado, at Whole Foods after asking questions at the store about the source of its meat products. Musician Moby posted a video on Instagram that questioned whether Whole Foods was "support[ing] an unconstitutional police state wherein people aren't allowed to ask questions".

In May 2018, Hsiung and other protesters walked into a Santa Rosa Egg Farms facility, rescued chickens, and recorded extensive video footage which illustrated systemic animal abuse, massacre and mutilation. Hsiung maintained that his actions and those of DxE were legal, providing a legal opinion to the owners and the employees of the facility when they demanded he and the protesters leave. The opinion asserts that California Penal Code Section 597e and the common law doctrine of necessity permit the removal of sick and dying animals in certain situations, including from commercial facilities DxE investigated. The opinion has been untested in court. Hsiung and Direct Action Everywhere have labeled this, and numerous other actions, as "open rescues".

Another large-scale action occurred on September 29, 2018, when activists, including Hsiung, walked into Petaluma Poultry in Petaluma, CA and provided water to chickens that they claimed were injured and could no longer walk to reach water on their own. The activists had set up tents as "medical centers" to care for the animals, providing them with water, food and also medical treatments for injured birds. After setting up on-site medical tents and treating some of the birds, the protesters started to leave the farm with both dead and alive animals, taking the ones who allegedly needed the most medical care. The police arrived at the scene with about 40 deputies and one helicopter, arresting the activists and handing the animals over to animal control. The police allowed the activists to take one hen off the property of the farm and to provide it with veterinary care, but 58 activists were arrested on various felony conspiracy, felony burglary, and misdemeanor trespass charges.

Hsiung has also been a part of several other high-profile protests and incidents, most notably a disruption of a San Francisco Giants-LA Dodgers baseball game in September 2016 that led to him being tackled by Giants player Angel Pagan on national TV. He was also a high-profile spokesman for a series of protests at presidential rallies during the 2016 Democratic Presidential Primary over the candidates' support for animal agriculture.

Hsiung has also given various talks at various universities about social activism and animal rights. In November 2014, Wayne Hsiung was a guest speaker at UC Berkeley, where he gave a talk titled, "What if Everything We Think We Know about Social Change is Wrong?" In January 2019, Hsiung gave a talk at Stanford University Law School titled "Changing the Law by Breaking It: a Conversation on Activism, Animal Welfare, and the Law with DxE Founder, Wayne Hsiung".

In an August 2019 DxE blog post, Hsiung announced that he was stepping down as DxE lead organizer in December 2019. In his July 2023 blog post on Substack, Hsiung said that he would be stepping down from all roles at DxE.

In December 2021, Hsiung was found guilty of two felonies, larceny and breaking and entering, in Transylvania County, North Carolina. The charges were based on an open rescue of an infant goat at a 15-acre farm. Hsiung represented himself in the proceedings, and he received a suspended sentence with 24 months of supervised probation and was required to pay the farmer US$250 as the value of the stolen goat. In other jurisdictions, he has faced charges of up to 60 years in prison for rescuing sick and injured animals from slaughterhouses.

In November 2023, Hsiung was sentenced to 90 days in jail and two years probation on trespassing charges after engaging in an open rescue of sick and dying chickens at the Sunrise Farms chicken farm in 2018. He served 38 days before being released early.

An unnamed activist and other former DxE activists alleged that the group's leadership, including Hsiung, were involved in sexual misconduct and abuse of power. Hsiung said the allegations against him were false and came largely from sources removed from DxE for misconduct.

=== Berkeley Animal Rights Center ===
In 2017, Hsiung was involved in the founding of the Berkeley Animal Rights Center, the first community center in the United States dedicated to animal rights. Hsiung has also been a speaker at the annual Animal Liberation Conference that takes place in Berkeley, California.

=== 2020 Berkeley Mayoral Race ===
On April 3, 2020, Hsiung announced he was running for Mayor of Berkeley. While focused on animal rights, his platform also included converting under-utilized corporate property into permanent supportive housing for individuals experiencing homelessness; accelerating Berkeley's carbon-neutral timeline to 2025; creating a plant-based, pedestrian-only, and fossil fuel-free "Green District"; and transitioning the Berkeley Police Department away from allegedly aggressive law enforcement to community health and support. Hsiung received 10,522 votes (24%) but was defeated by incumbent Jesse Arreguin who received 29,229 votes (65%).

=== The Simple Heart Initiative ===
Hsiung co-founded The Simple Heart Initiative (TSH) animal rights group. The mission of TSH is to build a mass movement for open rescue. In 2024, Harvard Law Review published an article co-written by Hsiung, Justin Marceau, and Steffen Seitz called, Voluntary Prosecution and the Case of Animal Rescue.

On March 15, 2026, Hsiung led a group of activists in an open rescue of dogs from the Wisconsin-based beagle breeder Ridglan Farms, citing Wisconsin law supporting citizens' right to rescue animals from abuse and Dane County Judge Rhonda Lanford's finding of probable cause that Ridglan had committed animal cruelty crimes. Several activists have been charged in connection to this rescue. 22 beagles were taken from activists from the facility, while 8 others were first taken, then seized by the police, who immediately returned them to Ridglan Farms. On April 18th, Hsiung returned to Ridglan farms with almost 1,000 activists. He was promptly arrested on scene while attempting to serve legal papers to Ridglan. Activists were met with both state and local authorities and suffered mace, rubber bullets, and tear gas used on site. It is unclear how many were arrested, but four, including Hsiung, faced criminal charges for their actions in the March rescue. All four have been released on bail and banned from Blue Mounds, Wisconsin. No beagles were removed from the facility.

== Personal life ==
Hsiung lives with his dogs, Oliver and James, and his wife in London. Hsiung said he rescued Oliver from Yulin, China, noting Oliver was to be slaughtered at the Yulin dog meat festival. James was rescued from Ridglan Farms in Wisconsin on March 15th 2026. Hsiung was on the board of directors of the Climate Defense Project, which represents environmental activists and pursues environmental impact litigation. Hsiung married Rose Patterson, an activist with Animal Rising (formerly Animal Rebellion), on April 1, 2025.

== See also ==
- List of animal rights advocates
