= Open rescue =

Direct rescue of animals from painful use

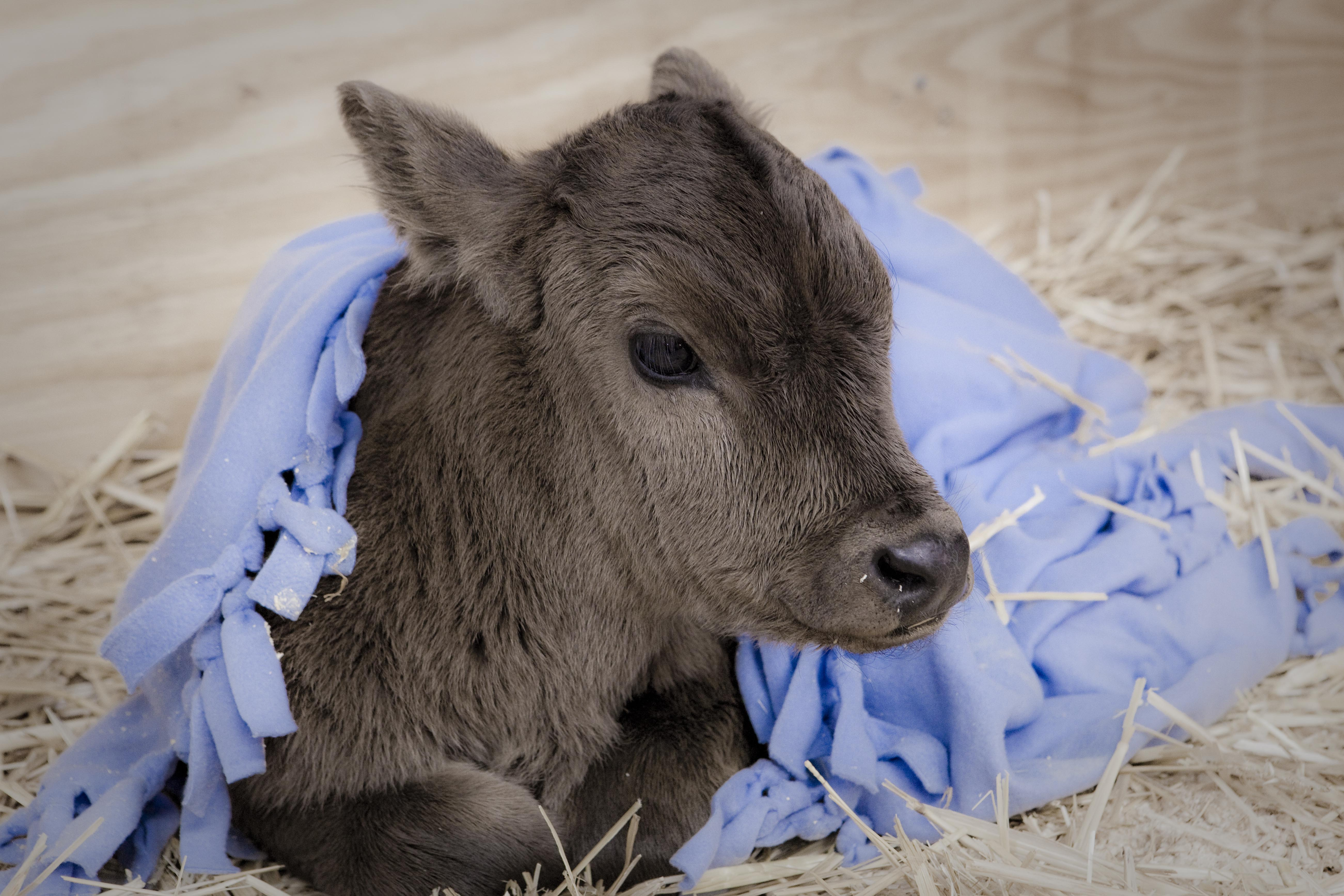
Calf rescued from a cattle company in Texas, moved to The Gentle Barn

In animal rights and welfare, open rescue is a direct action of rescue practiced by activists. Open rescue involves rescuing animals in pain and suffering, giving the rescued animals veterinary treatment and long-term care, documenting their living conditions, and ultimately, publicly releasing that documentation.

Open rescue's public nature contrasts with clandestine animal rights activism. Open rescue activists typically publish their full identities. Open rescue is nonviolent towards humans and other animals, although some groups practice property damage.

== History ==
=== Beginnings ===
The open rescue method was largely developed by Animal Liberation Victoria (ALV) Rescue Team, based in Melbourne. Inspired by satyagraha, the method and philosophy used by Mahatma Gandhi in the struggle for independence for India, the ALV developed this method in the 1980s and has since been conducting investigations and open rescue operations, actions which reportedly have been well received by the public. At one point an Australian MP joined in the rescue operation of factory farmed piglets.

While not called open rescue, several other activist groups began engaging in activities similar to open rescue around the same time. People for the Ethical Treatment of Animals rescued several monkeys in 1981 from a lab in Silver Spring, Maryland and sparked discussion in The Washington Post.

=== Introduction to United States ===
In 1999, Patty Mark of the ALV presented open rescue at United Poultry Concern's Direct Action for Animals Conference. Displaying the positive results of the open rescue actions in Australia and by comparing videos from an open rescue action and a clandestine action, she managed to convince a number of people of the usefulness of open rescue both on the grounds of compassion for animals and on the grounds of the reception by the general public, opening for the open rescue method on the international arena.

Soon after this, Compassionate Action for Animals (US) adopted the method, and other organizations followed. Activist Adam Durand with Compassionate Consumers conducted an open rescue at a Wegmans' egg farm in 2004. The Animal Protection and Rescue League conducted an open rescue and investigation at a Hudson Valley foie gras farm in 2011.

=== U.S. revival and international growth ===
In the United States, open rescue became less common and came to a halt for ten years in the mid-2000s until Direct Action Everywhere released an investigation of a "Certified Humane" cage-free Whole Foods egg supplier in January 2015. There have since been over a dozen open rescues in several different locations in North America.

Direct Action Everywhere's open rescues in The New York Times, Wall Street Journal, and elsewhere have put pressure on several Whole Foods suppliers. A DxE investigation at a cage-free Costco egg supplier raised questions about an industry-wide shift in 2016 toward cage-free eggs. DxE centers its investigations around "humanewashing", or the alleged attempt by animal food companies to falsely market products as humane. In 2017, DxE sued Whole Foods turkey supplier Diestel Turkey Ranch under California's false advertising laws.

Currently, openrescue.org, a network for organisations practising open rescue, lists 18 different open rescue organisations, with varying level of activity, in five different countries on three continents – Australia and New Zealand (Oceania), Austria, Germany, the Czech Republic and Sweden (Europe) and United States (North America). A number of organizations, including Animal Liberation Victoria, Direct Action Everywhere, Tomma burar, Tierretter.de, VGT, and Animal Rights have begun coordinating an "international open rescue day" on March 5 launched on the website openrescues.com.

== Criminality ==
Some practitioners of open rescue argue they are not guilty of any crime and that they act in defense of others, especially if the rescued animals have not been kept in accordance with laws regulating animal husbandry. Similarly, others cite the disregard of the owner's violations of such laws as sufficient justification, and point out the hypocrisy of the strict enforcement of the law against open rescue activists.

Majja Carlsson of the Swedish open rescue organisation Räddningstjänsten (lit. 'The Rescue Service') was one of four activists that rescued 120 hens in the largest open rescue operation to date. In her description of the action, she writes the following (translated from Swedish):

Quite possibly legal ramifications will follow this action. Naturally, I realize that some will label this as a crime even though I disagree with them. It is sad that we are the ones considered criminals in this society, and not the egg industry which has in fact violated the Swedish Animal Protection Act for over fifteen years. That the law intended to protect the animals is widely ignored while crimes against the right of ownership are seen as serious offences.

Similarly, Räddningstjänsten writes in a comment to the legal proceedings that followed the action (translated from Swedish) "We acted and saved 120 individuals from unnecessary suffering and certain premature death. [...] The real crimes are not committed by us, but by the animal industry."

In the United States, courts have often sided with prosecutors in the suppression of evidence of animal cruelty exposed by animal rights activists in cases involving animal liberation and open rescues, as it makes it easier for the defendants to be prosecuted as thieves and terrorists under the Animal Enterprise Protection Act. According to The Intercept's Natasha Lennard, this is one of the legacies of the Green Scare, when the government, at the behest of pharmaceutical and agricultural corporations, aggressively prosecuted animal rights activists as so-called "eco-terrorists".

== Arguments for open rescue ==
Open rescue "puts a face on animal liberation". By being open, proponents argue that they get a more positive response from the media and the general population, and that by not wearing masks they reduce the distance between themselves and the public, they become a normal everyday person whom the public can identify with and not an abstract masked "terrorist". Being open removes or tones down the militant edge of direct actions.

Open rescue proponents also argue that their method of operation is conducive to their compassion for the rescued animals. One of the things reportedly shown by the video comparison at the aforementioned United Poultry Concern's forum on Direct Actions was that the open rescue activist displayed more compassion and care for the animals compared to the clandestine activists (which is not to say that the clandestine activists did not display compassion and care). Whether this is due to that the operations are unmasked, that the operations are open or some other quality is still open for argument.

== See also ==
- Animal Outlook (formerly Compassion Over Killing) – an organisation which practices open rescue
- Civil disobedience
- Ecotage
- Veganism
- Vegetarianism
