= Animal Liberation Victoria =

Animal rights organisation

Animal Liberation Victoria Inc.
- Founded: 1978
- Founder: Patty Mark
- Purpose: Animal rights, veganism
- Location: Melbourne
- Method: Education, investigation, open rescues
- Key people: Noah Hannibal (President)
- Website: www.alv.org.au

Animal Liberation Victoria Inc. (ALV) are an independent not-for-profit animal rights organisation incorporated in the state of Victoria, Australia, and are a registered charity with the Australian Charities and Not-for-profits Commission (ACNA). ALV were founded in 1978 by Patty Mark, with the mission of saving lives and ending animal exploitation. Their mission is to abolish the property status of animals, change speciesist attitudes and practices, educate the public about animal rights and veganism, and embrace the principles of non-violence and compassion. ALV is managed by an elected committee in accordance with the Victorian Incorporated Associations Act.

== Activism ==
ALV was established in 1978 by Patty Mark, an animal rights activist. After reading Peter Singer's book Animal Liberation in 1978, Mark put a notice up in the local milk bar on 7 December 1978, that said ‘Help the Hens’, which attracted 17 people to Marks living room, initiating the beginning of ALV. In the early years of their operation, ALV’s activism was focused on improving animal welfare through liaising with the local department of agriculture, visiting abattoirs to prove that animals were stressed and therefore try and improve their living conditions. They also held street marches, outreach in shopping centers, school talks, and made petitions. In the late 1990’s, after reading the work of Gary L. Francine, Mark decided to change ALV from an animal welfare organisation, to an abolitionist animal rights organisation.

In 1993, Mark received a call about the inhumane treatment of hens at a battery hen facility in Victoria, inspiring the birth of ALV's Open Rescue practice. Animal Liberation Victoria was the first group that made open rescues of hens.

They have also protested against sheep exports, in Port of Devonport, whaling, the killing of animals on television by Jamie Oliver, animal deaths in Melbourne Zoo, and the 2007 Australian and New Zealand Council for the Care of Animals in Research and Teaching (ANZCCART) conference.

ALV supported and managed the Action Animal Rescue Team, a group formed in 1993 whose purpose was to "save the lives of unattended and neglected animals who are left sick and dying in factory farms" and "document (with video footage and photographs) the conditions for animals in factory farms, feedlots, live export and abattoirs."

In May 2005, they also offered to provide legal assistance to the students of a rural school, who opposed the idea to slaughter a pig and cow that they raised. Bernie Williams, executive producer of the 2016 film Charlotte's Web, wrote an e-mail to the school in support of the students.

== Campaigns ==
=== Education and Outreach ===
ALV educates the community about the horrors of animal agriculture with resources such as pig truth.com, cow truth.com, fishtruth.com and more. They educate the community about ethical alternatives to animal products with resources such as VeganEasy.org, and provide strategic support and development to the animal liberation movement. They also offer non-graphic presentations for schools across Victoria which highlight the relationship between human and non-human animals, and encourage students to think critically.

ALV undertake various types of outreach including rallies, to educate the community about the treatment of animals in abattoirs and increase activism for animal rights and supplying free Vegan Easy booklets to vegan cafes and community members to assist people in opening their hearts and minds to veganism and helping save the lives of countless animals. “The Vegan Easy booklet is designed as a companion piece to the Vegan Easy website and the free 30 Day Vegan Easy Challenge, where people new to veganism can follow a structured 30 day program of recipes and tips to help kickstart their journey toward a kinder, greener life”. They also perform video outreach on the streets of Australia, showing footage from investigations inside slaughterhouses to raise awareness for the animals who are suffering behind closed doors.

=== Liberation Sanctuary ===
Founded in 1986, Liberation Sanctuary is a registered non-profit charity and is Australia's longest running dedicated sanctuary for animals freed from the exploitation and slaughter inherent to animal agriculture. Liberation Sanctuary began after ALV founder Patty Mark, had several battery hens surrendered to her, and she looked after them at her large block of land, 10 kilometres from Melbourne’s CBD; Liberation Sanctuary’s first residence. This property became home to hundreds of animals over the next 30 years, with the local council providing Mark with a special animal permit that had conditions such as a limit to the number of animals on the property and no roosters or piglets, other than for short term care and rehabilitation.

In 2016, Liberation Sanctuary moved to country Victoria on a 45 acre property which is now home to animals in need that have been taken in by ALV. Liberation Sanctuary vows to use their animal families’ freedom stories to educate the wider public on the importance of animal liberation and respect for all beings.

=== Vegan Easy ===
Vegan Easy was founded in 2009 as an initiative of Animal Liberation Victoria. Since 2021, they have been partners with the charity, Vegan Australia. Vegan Easy is a grassroots campaign that promotes veganism as an ethical, rational, and earth friendly lifestyle. The campaign involves a 30 Day Challenge, which aims to support and motivate new vegans by showing them how easy and delicious vegan food can be. They also provide free resources including; basic nutrition advice, a health guide, eating out guide, vegan cheat sheet, and an ever growing collection of vegan recipes.

=== Ethical Community Program ===
The Ethical Community Program rewards people who donate $10 or more to ALV per month, with access to discounts from ethical, vegan businesses.

=== Animals Are Not Ours Memorial ===
On October 1, 2013, ALV held a public memorial at Melbourne's Federation Square, for the billions of land animals exploited and slaughtered every year. ALV activists held dead animals to draw the public’s attention to the way in which living beings seen as property suffer every day. The protest received media coverage from the ABC and Herald Sun

=== Slaughterhouse Lock-down ===
In 2015, after anonymous footage was supplied to ALV through a whistleblower from a slaughterhouse in Laverton, ALV investigated three separate Victorian pig slaughterhouses; Diamond Valley Pork, Laverton; Australian Food Group, Laverton and C A Sinclair, Benella. They released footage of pigs being forced into metal cages with a high amperage electric prod, before being lowered into a gas chamber where the gas causes burning sensations throughout their bodies and they suffocate to death.

To coincide with the release of the pig slaughter footage, ALV and other animal rights activists staged a non-violent, peaceful protest at the Victorian slaughterhouse, Diamond Valley Pork. Four activists chained themselves to the cages inside the slaughterhouse gas chamber and eight more, occupied the roof with banners, along with a larger group of around 50 protestors residing out the front. ALV founder Patty mark said that “activists involved in today’s action had taken a ‘vow of non-violence’ with an aim to close down the slaughterhouse for as long as possible. This action achieved extensive media coverage, and Diamond Valley Pork was successfully shut down for at least 3 hours due to the activists chaining themselves to the cages.

== Conflicts with RSPCA Victoria ==
They have had some conflicts with RSPCA Victoria. In March 2005, ALV found in the farm Parkhurst several injured, sick and dead hens. The police were called, and when they arrived and found the facts, Sergeant Mick Brien phoned the RSPCA for assistance, who refused to attend. Then the police arranged for ALV to remove the sick and dying hens and escorted them to Werribee Vet Clinic. Patty Mark, ALV president, said "Unfortunately the RSPCA not only refused to attend and assist the police on the night, they have failed to do an urgent inspection this morning taking other very ill and dehydrated birds to a vet or to even contact the owner. They only told ALV they would look at the place "next week" and "If the police and members of ALV can see the suffering and know it is wrong and illegal, why can't the RSPCA? Once again they have failed in their duty to protect "all creatures great and small", and it is time they were made accountable".

On 4 September 2006, ALV sent a letter to Dr Hugh Wirth, RSPCA Victoria's President, asking them to "abstain from serving or eating animals" for their RSPCA Annual Gala Ball, in line with the RSPCA UK’s decision on 26 June 2006; to only serve “strictly vegetarian” (i.e. vegan) food at future RSPCA Annual General Meetings”. RSPCA Chief Executive Officer, Maria Mercurio, responded to Mark, insinuating that they would not be following in the footsteps of the RSPCA UK’s decision, instead they stated that “a vegan or vegetarian lifestyle is not what the RSPCA is all about. However, at all of our events where food is served, vegetarian options are always presented”. Among other criticisms, Mercurio said:

"We know that ALV will continue to attend RSPCA events in Victoria and target our staff, volunteers and guests. We are continually asked why ALV don't hold their own events if they truly wish to get wide attention for their issues; why don't they lobby governments and why don't they try to influence industry, instead of targeting the RSPCA?"

ALV has also criticised that while the RSPCA says it's against battery cages, they are in business with the largest battery egg producer in Australia, Pace Farms. They have also accused RSPCA approved barnlaid sheds of which ALV claim to have documented later "overcrowding, beak mutilations, lack of perches, prevention of roosting, chronic stress and electric shock training to the hens", among many other criticisms.

== See also ==
- Animal welfare and rights in Australia
