= Jewish vegetarianism =

Vegetarianism among followers of Judaism

Jewish vegetarianism is a commitment to vegetarianism that is connected to Judaism, Jewish ethics or Jewish identity. Jewish vegetarians often cite Jewish principles regarding animal welfare, environmental ethics, moral character, and health as reasons for adopting a vegetarian or vegan diet.

== In pre-modern times ==
Vegetarianism was not traditionally a component of mainstream pre-modern Judaism, though the laws of kashrut limit consumption of certain animals or their products, with precise requirements for how animals are to be sacrificed and slaughtered (shechita). According to Rabbis Shlomo Ephraim Luntschitz and Abraham Isaac Kook, the complexity of these laws was intended to discourage the consumption of meat. Kashrut may also be designed to discourage killing living beings.

There are also examples of vegetarianism as an ideal in ancient Judaism. Genesis 1:29 states "And God said: Behold, I have given you every herb yielding seed which is upon the face of all the earth, and every tree that has seed-yielding fruit—to you it shall be for food." Many scholars see the Torah as thereby pointing to vegetarianism as an ideal, as Adam and Eve did not partake of the flesh of animals as all humans and animals were originally commanded by God to only eat plants. According to some interpretations, God's original plan was for mankind to be vegetarian, and God only later gave permission for man to eat meat in a covenant with Noah (Genesis 9:1–17) as a temporary concession because of Man's weak nature. This concessionary view of meat-consumption is based on the scriptural analysis of several Rishonim.

Some writers assert that the Jewish prophet Isaiah was a vegetarian, on the basis of passages in the Book of Isaiah that extol nonviolence and reverence for life, such as Isaiah 1:11, 11:6–9, 65:25, and 66:3. Some of these writers refer to "the vegetarian Isaiah", "the notorious vegetarian Isaiah", and "Isaiah, the vegetarian prophet". Critics of this view argue that none of the Biblical verses in question refer to a human diet: they either condemn certain animal sacrifices, or else prophesize that carnivorous animals will become herbivorous at the end of days.

According to Daniel 1:8–16, the pious Jewish youths Daniel, Hananiah, Mishael, and Azariah refused to eat food or drink wine served in Nebuchadnezzar's palace. At Daniel's request, the four boys were subjected to a test; they were fed only vegetables and water for ten days. At the end of the ten days, the four boys were in better condition than the other boys who ate the king's food. The youths chose to eat this food because the king's food was non-kosher, not because the king's food was non-vegan.

A number of ancient Jewish sects, including early Karaite sects, regarded the eating of meat as prohibited as long as Zion was in ruins and Israel in exile.

A number of medieval scholars of Judaism, such as Joseph Albo and Isaac Arama, regard vegetarianism as a moral ideal, not out of a concern for animal welfare per se but out of a concern for the moral character of the slaughterer. Rabbeinu Asher ben Meshullam was said never to have tasted meat.

== In modern times ==
=== Modern-day proponents ===
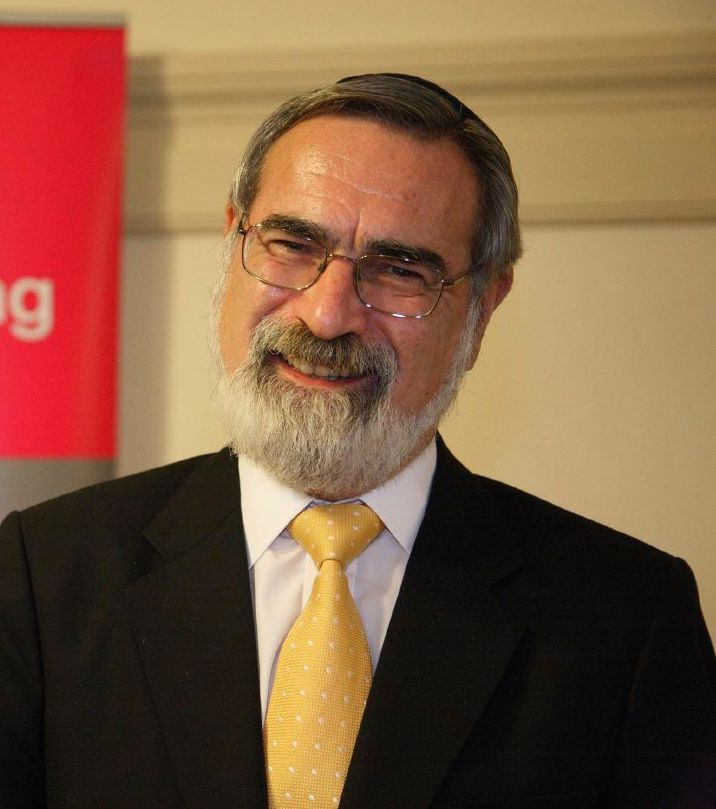
Rabbi Jonathan Sacks

A number of prominent rabbis have advocated vegetarianism or veganism. In 2017, a statement by Jewish Veg encouraging veganism for all Jews was signed by notable rabbis including Jonathan Wittenberg, Daniel Sperber, David Wolpe, Nathan Lopes Cardozo, Kerry Olitzky, Shmuly Yanklowitz, Aryeh Cohen, Geoffrey Claussen, Rami M. Shapiro, David Rosen, Raysh Weiss, Elyse Goldstein, Shefa Gold, and Yonassan Gershom. Other notable rabbis who were vegetarian or spoke positively of vegetarianism include Abraham Isaac Kook, David Cohen (known as "Ha-Nazir"), Everett Gendler, Shlomo Goren, Irving Greenberg, Jeremy Gimpel, Asa Keisar, Jonathan Sacks, She'ar Yashuv Cohen, and Yitzhak HaLevi Herzog, Simchah Roth, and Joseph Soloveitchik . David Cohen wrote an influential essay, A Vision of Vegetarianism and Peace (first published in installments in 1903–04), summarizing Kook's ideas about the "coming of the new society" in which humankind becomes vegan.

Other notable Jewish vegetarians include Shmuel Yosef Agnon, Isaac Bashevis Singer, Reuven Rivlin, Franz Kafka, Richard H. Schwartz, Jonathan Safran Foer, Aaron S. Gross, Ori Shavit, Roberta Kalechofsky, Tara Strong, Mark Braunstein, and Natalie Portman.

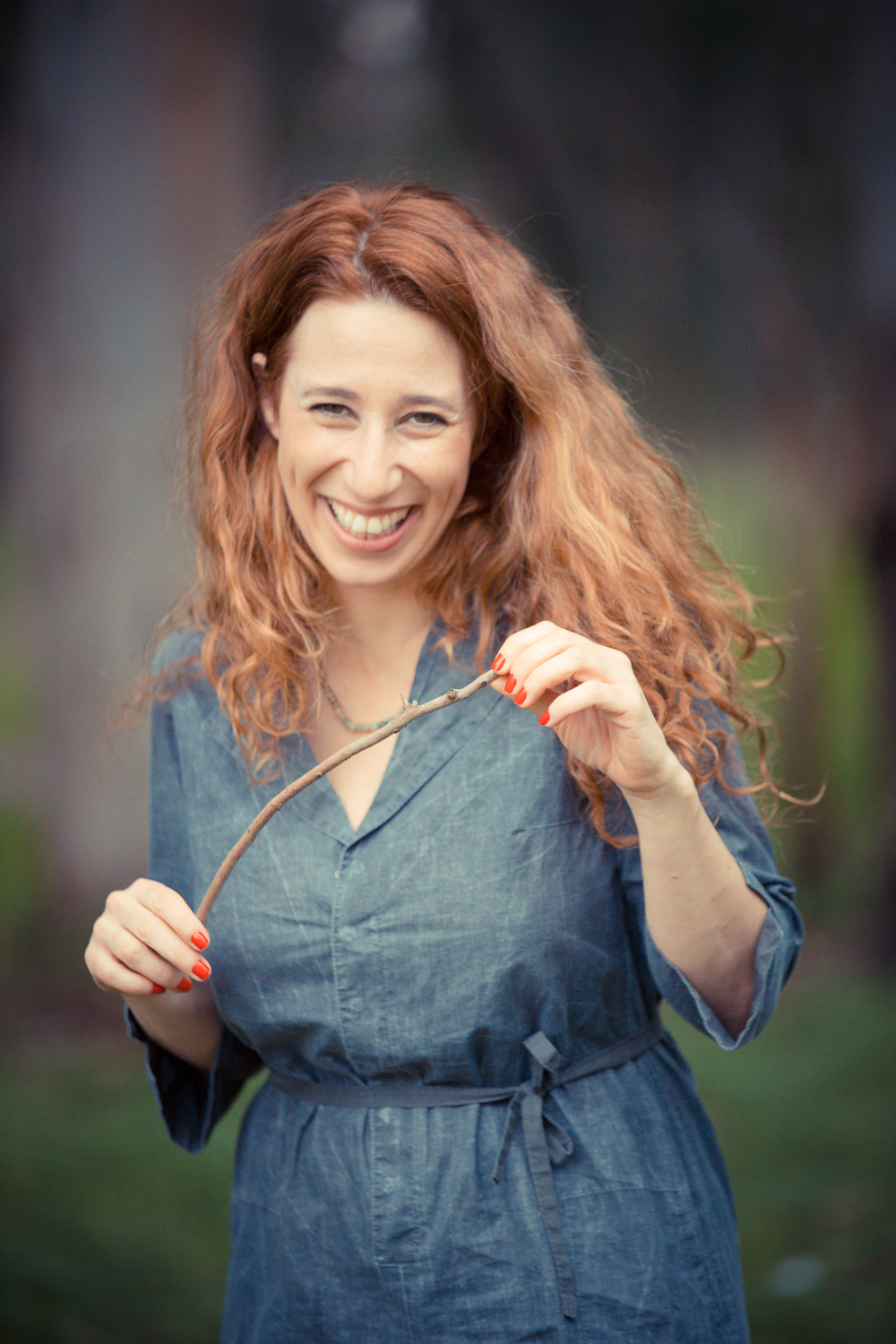
Ori Shavit

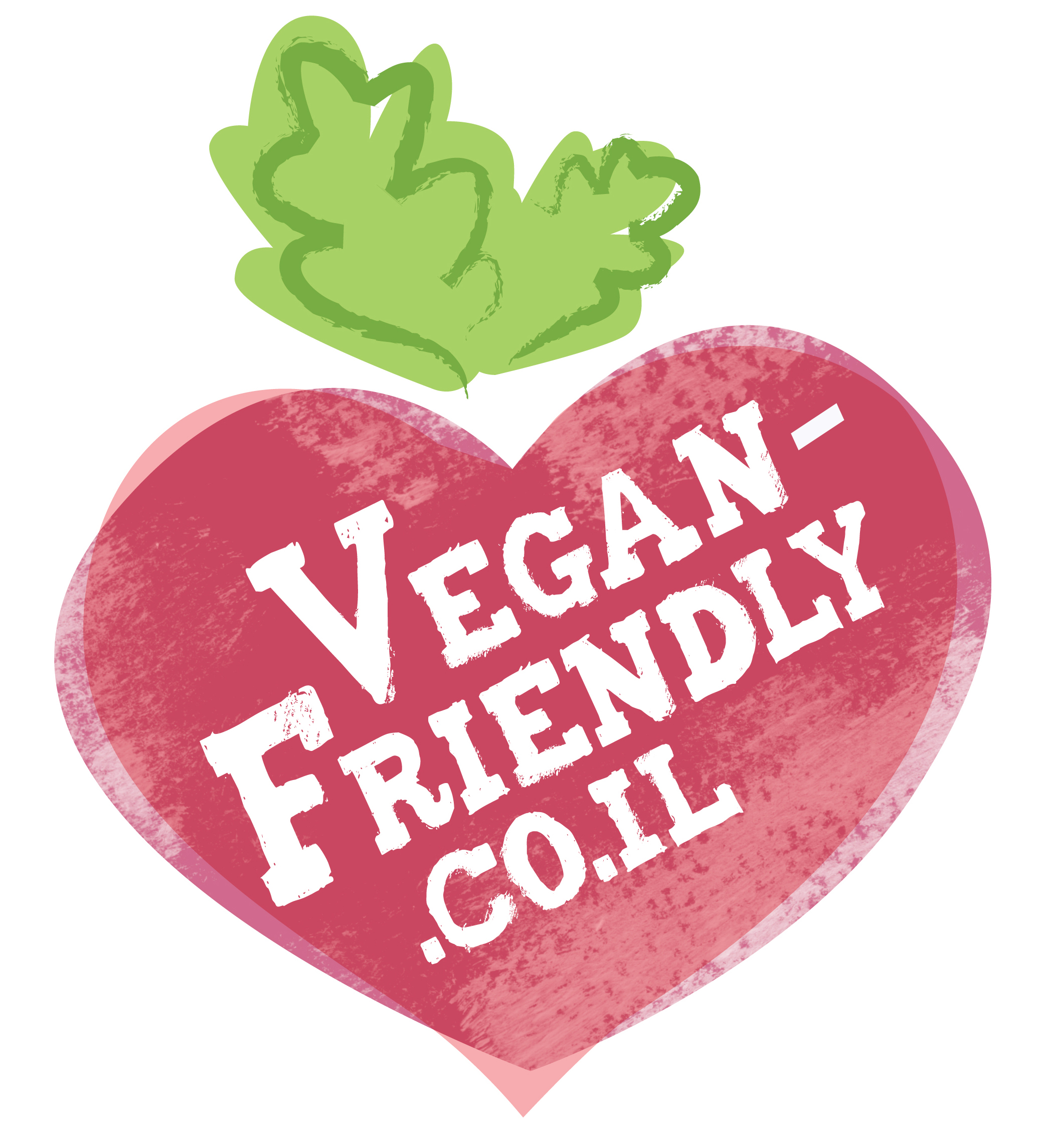
Logo of Tel Aviv-based "Vegan Friendly"

Albert Einstein (d. 1955) was a vegetarian for the last year of his life, although he had advocated vegetarianism in principle since 1930.

The first Jewish-vegetarian cookbook has been compiled by Fania Lewando and was first published in 1938 in Vilnius. An English translation was issued in 2015.

A number of groups promote Jewish vegetarianism:

- Jewish Veg was founded by Jonathan Wolf as Jewish Vegetarians of North America (JVNA) in 1975 to promote Jewish vegetarianism. JVNA changed its name to Jewish Veg in 2015. The organization has been noted for its 2007 film A Sacred Duty and for sponsoring university lecture tours by figures including Ori Shavit.
- SHAMAYIM: Jewish Animal Advocacy, founded and led by Rabbi Dr. Shmuly Yanklowitz, promotes a vegan diet in the Jewish community through animal welfare activism, kosher veganism, and Jewish spirituality. Prior to 2019, it was known as the Shamayim V'Aretz Institute.
- The Jewish Vegetarian Society (JVS) was co-founded (briefly as the Jewish Vegetarian and Natural Health Society, before the name was abbreviated) by Vivien and Philip Pick in the 1960s with the aim of promoting a kinder society without killing animals for food. Philip Pick was the first chairman of the organisation, with Maurice Norman Lester the first vice chairman and his wife Carole Lester its first secretary.
- Amirim, an Israeli vegetarian moshav (village), was founded in 1958. The founders of Amirim were motivated to create a vegetarian village because of their love for animals and concern for animal rights, as well as for health reasons. Both religious and non-religious families live at Amirim.
- The "Concern for Helping Animals in Israel (CHAI)" animal welfare organization promotes Jewish vegetarianism; CHAI's building project is named the Isaac Bashevis Singer Humane Education Center.
- Behemla is a Haredi organization that advocates against animal cruelty and promotes veganism.
- Animals Now is an Israeli animal rights organization that promotes Jewish vegetarianism on their website and has been described as a Jewish vegetarian organization. The group was known as Anonymous for Animal Rights from its founding in 1994 until 2018.
- Vegan Friendly is an organization in Tel Aviv that works to make veganism mainstream, organizes an annual "Vegan Congress", and promotes the vegan celebration of Jewish holidays.

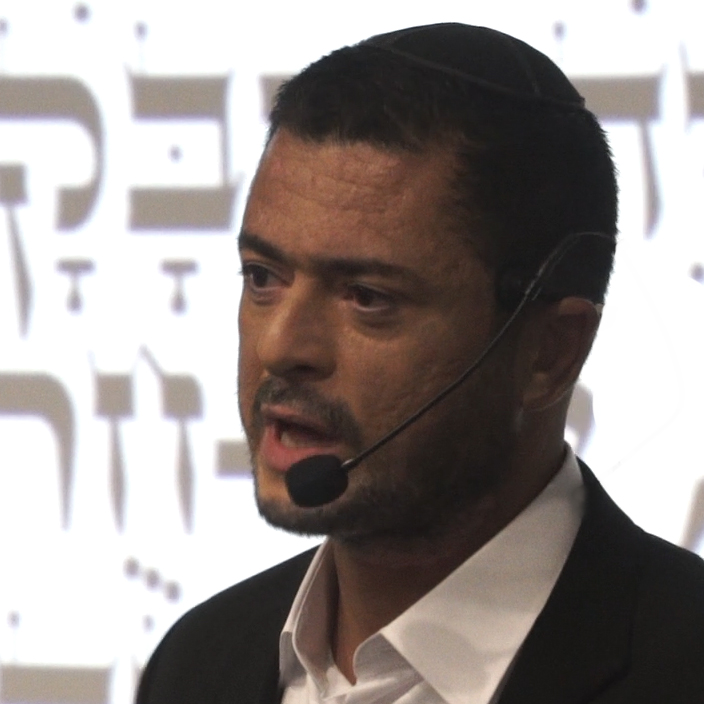
Asa Keisar

Jewish vegetarianism and veganism have become especially popular among Israeli Jews. In 2016, an op-ed argued that Israel was "the most vegan country on Earth", as five percent of its population eschewed all animal products. That number had more than doubled since 2010, when only 2.6 percent of Israelis were either vegan or vegetarian. Veganism is particularly popular in the city of Tel Aviv, which has been described as the "vegan capital of the world".

Interest in veganism and vegetarianism has grown among Israel's diverse Jewish populations, including among secular Jews and Orthodox Jews. The Israeli rabbi Asa Keisar is a rare example of an Orthodox rabbi who has argued that eating meat and animal byproducts is no longer permitted according to Jewish sources, because of the cruelty inflicted on animals. It is more common for Orthodox rabbis to call on Jews to reduce their consumption of animal products, as when a consortium of 120 Orthodox rabbis scholars, and community leaders in Jerusalem, known as Beit Hillel, issued a paper calling on Jews to reduce meat consumption in order to alleviate animal suffering.

=== Ethical arguments ===
There are several religious and philosophical arguments used by modern Jewish vegetarians regarding the ethics of eating meat. According to some, vegetarianism is consistent with the sacred teachings and highest ideals of Judaism, including compassion, health, life, conservation of resources, tzedakah, kashrut, peace, and justice. In contrast, the mass production and consumption of meat and other animal products contradicts many Jewish values and teachings, gravely harming people, animals, communities, and the environment.

One mitzvah cited by vegetarians is tza'ar ba'alei hayyim; the injunction not to cause "pain to living creatures". The laws of shechita are meant to prevent the suffering of animals. However, factory farming and high-speed mechanized kosher slaughterhouses have been criticized for failing to meet the essence of shechita. Jonathan Safran Foer narrated the short documentary film If This Is Kosher..., which records what he considers abuses within the kosher meat industry.

Another mitzvah often cited by Jewish vegetarians is bal tashchit, the law which prohibits waste. They suggest that an omnivorous diet is wasteful, since it uses 5 times more grain, 10 times more water, 15 times more land and 20 times more energy when compared to a vegan diet.

Some Jewish vegetarians also stress the commandment to maintain one's health and not harm oneself (venishmartem me'od lenafshoteichem), and point to research indicating that following a vegetarian diet promotes better health. Jewish vegetarians have also argued for environmental vegetarianism, pointing out that global warming, hunger and the depletion of natural resources can be lessened by a global shift to a vegetarian or vegan diet.

== Opposition ==
According to some interpretations of Jewish law, it is not acceptable for an individual to become a vegetarian if they do so because they believe in animal rights. This is based on the Torah, which not only is replete with instances of eating meat, but also includes several commandments that specifically call for meat to be eaten, such as eating of the Passover sacrifice and other animal sacrifices. However, vegetarianism is allowed for pragmatic reasons (if kosher meat is expensive or hard to come by in their area), health concerns, or for reasons of personal taste (if someone finds meat unpalatable). The halakha encourages the eating of meat at the Sabbath and Festival meals; thus some Orthodox Jews who are otherwise vegetarian will nevertheless consume meat at these meals. Some Jews see more moderate views to vegetarianism as the ideal. In 2015, members of the Liberal Judaism synagogue in Manchester founded The Pescetarian Society, citing pescetarianism as originally a Jewish diet, and pescetarianism as a form of vegetarianism.

== See also ==
- Judaism and environmentalism
- Vegetarianism and religion
