= A Sacred Duty =

A Sacred Duty: Applying Jewish Values to Help Heal the World
- Cover image for the DVD
- Directed by: Lionel Friedberg
- Written by: Lionel Friedberg
- Produced by: Lionel Friedberg
- Cinematography: Lionel Friedberg
- Edited by: Diana Friedberg
- Music by: Andrew Keresztes
- Production companies: Zepra International, Inc.
- Distributed by: Jewish Veg
- Release date: October 2007
- Running time: 60 minutes
- Country: United States
- Language: English

A Sacred Duty: Applying Jewish Values to Help Heal the World is a 2007 American documentary film written, directed, and produced by Lionel Friedberg. It was distributed by Jewish Veg, then known as the Jewish Vegetarians of North America (JVNA). The film centers on Jewish teachings about caring for the planet, treatment of animals, and the environment, with a focus on Jewish vegetarianism. Interviews with rabbis, activists, and scholars are interspersed with footage and stills illustrating the points being discussed.

== Synopsis ==
The film opens with footage of a NASA rocket launch, an animation of the Solar System, and a quote from Deuteronomy 30:19 about choosing between life and death (illustrated with images of Earth as seen from space, contrasted with an exploding atom bomb). This is followed by a statement that humanity has not been caring for the planet properly according to Jewish teachings, which precedes a section about ancient Jewish texts and sacred words that provide "specific instructions on how to be custodians of the world in which we live". Throughout the film, quotes from the Torah are contrasted with the various environmental threats facing humanity today; the quotes are also illustrated with close-ups of Hebrew scrolls, Jews praying, and scenes of nature.

The Earth is again seen from space and the camera moves in to focus on Israel, which the narrator cites as a microcosm of current global problems related to air and water pollution, overpopulation, climate change, and health concerns. The film moves on to look at global problems, with scenes shot all over the world. The focus then shifts to the United States, where all the relevant issues are discussed in detail. Reference is made to Livestock's Long Shadow, a 2006 report by the Food and Agriculture Organization which claimed that livestock agriculture produces more greenhouse gases than all of the world's vehicles combined.

Next comes a brief presentation, illustrated with simple animated charts, on how meat production is an inefficient way to produce food for a hungry world. This moves into footage of animal abuse on feedlots and in factory farms, and the pollution produced by these facilities. The film then focuses on the advantages of vegetarianism for reducing pollution and solving world hunger. With a change of diet toward vegetarianism, the film asserts that many of these environmental and health problems can be solved. After some fast-moving images of people and nature accompanied by music, the film ends with the same statement from Deuteronomy about "life and death" being narrated over a shot of a sunrise.

== Cast ==
- Lionel Friedberg as the narrator
  - Theodore Bikel as the narrator of Biblical quotations
- Rabbi Shear Yashuv Cohen—Ashkenazic Chief Rabbi of Haifa
- Rabbi David Rosen—Former Chief Rabbi of Ireland; International Director of Interreligious Affairs of the American Jewish Committee
- Rabbi Michael Cohen - Co-founder of the Green Zionist Alliance (GZA) and a teacher at the Arava Institute in Israel
- Rabbi Fred Scherlinder Dobb, Adat Shalom Reconstructionist Congregation; environmental activist, and co-founder of the Green Zionist Alliance
- Rabbi Adam Frank - Congregation Moreshet Yisrael, Jerusalem, the largest Conservative synagogue in Israel
- Rabbi Yonassan Gershom - A Breslov Chassid and author
- Rabbi Simchah Roth - Torat Hayyim, Herzilia
- Rabbi Warren Stone - Temple Emanuel, greater Washington, D.C.; Chair, Central Conference of American Rabbis' Environmental Committee
- Dr. Yeshayahu Bar-Or - Chief Scientist: Israel Environmental Ministry
- Raanan Boral - Director: Environmental Protection Division of the Society of Protection of Nature in Israel (SPNI)
- Samuel Chayen - Israeli environmental activist
- Yael Cohen Paran, Yair Cohen and Eren Ben Yaminy - Leaders of Green Course, an Israeli university-based environmental group
- Eli Groner - Teacher of environmental studies at the Arava Institute
- Dr. Alon Tal - Leading Israeli environmentalist; founder of the Israel Union for Environmental Defense; co-founder of the Green Zionist Alliance; author of Pollution in a Promised Land.
- Yael Ukeles - Director: Derech Hateva, Jerusalem
- Dr. Joel Fuhrman, M.D. - a proponent of a micro-nutrient diet.
- Roberta Kalechofsky - Founder and director of Jews for Animal Rights (JAR) and Micah Publications; author, editor and publisher.
- Dr. Richard H. Schwartz - Author of Judaism and Vegetarianism and president of Jewish Vegetarians of North America (JVNA); Green Zionist Alliance delegate to the World Zionist Congress
- Jonathan Wolf - Founder and first president of Jewish Vegetarians of North America (JVNA)

== Production ==
The idea for the film was inspired by the writings of Richard H. Schwartz (Judaism and Vegetarianism, Judaism and Global Survival, etc.) who also served as associate producer. Schwartz had seen the Christian Vegetarian Association's 2006 film, Honoring God's Creation, and felt that a similar film would be effective in the Jewish community. At the time, he envisioned the film to be about 30 minutes long, though the final film ended up being 60 minutes long.

Production began in 2005 with a basic proposal and outline in the JVNA's newsletter, along with a statement that Lionel Friedberg was willing to make the film for "a very low fee, basically to cover his costs". The film was funded by the JVNA through private contributions. Preliminary drafts of the script were circulated among members of the JVNA advisory committee and others for input, after which the script went through numerous revisions. Meanwhile, Schwartz and Friedberg set about interviewing possible participants and filming footage of nature in both Israel and the United States. Some stock footage was also acquired.

The showing of slaughterhouse footage was controversial, with some members of a test audience in Staten Island seeing it as propaganda. Friedberg recalled, "Richard and I were accused of making a propaganda film for the vegetarian movement. We were accused of showing 'horrors that are impossible to watch'." However, he maintained that the graphic footage was necessary. In contrasting his film with the more sanitized versions produced by the kosher meat industry, Friedberg stated, "To celebrate Judaism by depicting the assembly-line process by which animals are miraculously and happily turned into food for the Shabbat table without depicting the brutal cruelty and suffering that goes along with that process makes a mockery of the real meaning of our faith." The film opens with a warning that it contains material that might be disturbing to some viewers.

== Distribution ==
In October and November 2007, A Sacred Duty was released direct-to-video and on DVD, with public showings in both Israel and the United States. Over 35,000 copies were distributed free of charge to synagogues, educational institutions, and individuals, complete with permission to show the film without having to pay the filmmakers any royalties. In addition, permission was granted to the public to duplicate and distribute the film free of charge. Numerous short excerpts from the film were edited and re-posted by various YouTube users, and the full version became available on YouTube in January 2008.

== See also ==
- Jewish vegetarianism
- List of vegan and plant-based media
