= Jewish Veg =

Nonprofit organization based in Pittsburgh

- Formation: 1975
- Founder: Jonathan Wolf
- Type: 501(c)(3) charitable organization
- Legal status: Active
- Executive Director: Jeffrey Cohan
- President Emeritus: Richard H. Schwartz
- Formerly called: Jewish Vegetarians of North America; Jewish Vegetarian Society of America

Jewish Veg is an international 501(c)(3) charitable organization whose mission is to encourage and help Jews to embrace plant-based diets as an expression of the Jewish values of compassion for animals, concern for health, and care for the environment. Jewish Veg was formerly called Jewish Vegetarians of North America (JVNA) and, prior to that, the Jewish Vegetarian Society of America.

== History ==
The Jewish Vegetarian Society of America was founded in 1975 by Jonathan Wolf after a World Vegetarian Conference was held at the University of Maine in Orono, Maine. It was affiliated with the Jewish Vegetarians of England. Wolf stated in 1980: "In a real sense, vegetarianism is the highest form of Judaism... Intrinsic values in Judaism -- compassion for animals, concern about world hunger and ecology -- are exemplified by vegetarianism."

Wolf became the organization's first president. Other initial leaders of the organization included Charles Stahler, Debra Wasserman, Isaac Luchinsky, Florence Mitrani, Richard H. Schwartz, and Rabbi Noach Valley. Israel Mossman and Eva Mossman assumed leadership of the organization in the mid-1980s. Rabbi Noach Valley served as president in the 1990s and early 2000s. Richard H. Schwartz became president in 2002 and continues to serve as president emeritus.

== Activities since 2013 ==
In 2012, Jeffrey Cohan became executive director, and the organization's first professional staff member. Under Cohan's leadership, the organization has added professional staff, built a board of directors, and assembled Rabbinic and Advisory councils.

In 2015, Jewish Veg created a Veg Pledge campaign to help people adopt plant-based diets. Pledge-takers have the option to be connected with a vegan mentor if they so choose.

Jewish Veg has forged partnerships with prominent Jewish organizations, including Hazon, Hillel International, and Birthright Israel. In collaboration with Birthright Israel, Jewish Veg has organized vegan Israel tours.

Jewish Veg's speakers bureau gives numerous presentations in Jewish venues around the country. One of their most prominent speakers is Dr. Alex Hershaft, a holocaust survivor and the founder of the animal advocacy organization Farm Animal Rights Movement (FARM).

Jewish Veg organized their first campus speaking tours in 2015 and 2016: Israeli vegan leader Ori Shavit visited college campuses throughout the United States to speak to students about Jewish veganism.

Jewish Veg currently has local chapters in Houston, Philadelphia, and Washington, D.C. They are all-volunteer groups which are supported by staff at the national organization. The chapters serve to educate the local Jewish population about veganism and provide community for Jewish vegans.

Jewish Veg's website features plant-based versions of such traditional Jewish foods as challah, matzah ball soup and kugel.

In 2017, Jewish Veg published a statement by 75 rabbis encouraging Jews to move towards a vegan diet. Notable rabbis who signed the statement included Jonathan Wittenberg, Daniel Sperber, David Wolpe, Nathan Lopes Cardozo, Kerry Olitzky, Shmuly Yanklowitz, Aryeh Cohen, Geoffrey Claussen, Rami M. Shapiro, David Rosen, Raysh Weiss, Elyse Goldstein, Shefa Gold, and Yonassan Gershom. As of 2023, nearly 200 rabbis had signed the statement.

== See also ==
- Jewish vegetarianism
- Vegetarianism and religion
- Judaism and environmentalism
- List of vegetarian and vegan organizations
