= Richard H. Schwartz =

American mathematician

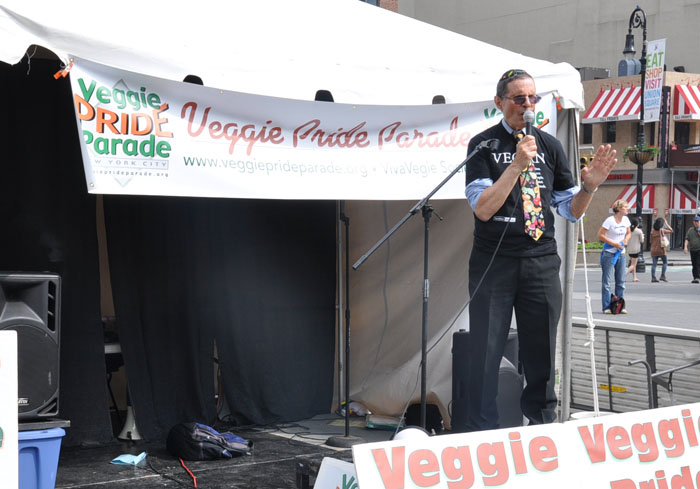
- Schwartz in 2011
- Born: 1934 (age 91–92); Arverne, New York, U.S.
- Education: California State University, Northridge; Cornell University
- Occupations: Activist; author; mathematician
- Years active: 1975–present
- Spouse: Loretta Susskind (m. 1960)
- Parent(s): his father, John; his mother, Mildred

Richard H. Schwartz is a professor emeritus of mathematics at the College of Staten Island; president emeritus of the Jewish Vegetarians of North America (JVNA); and co-founder and coordinator of the Society of Ethical and Religious Vegetarians (SERV). He is best known as a Jewish vegetarian activist and advocate for animal rights in the United States and Israel.

== Early life ==
Schwartz was born in Arverne, New York in 1934. His father, Joseph (Zundel), was 31 at the time, and his mother, Rose, was 29. They were not vegetarians, nor was he a vegetarian as a youth. He describes his upbringing as being a "meat and potatoes person" whose favorite dish was pot roast. In 1975, he began teaching a course called "Mathematics and the Environment" at the College of Staten Island. Schwartz married Loretta Susskind on February 14, 1960, at the Utopia Jewish Center in Queens. He reports that he became vegetarian in 1977 and vegan in 2000.

== Activism ==
As an Orthodox Jew, Schwartz began to explore what Judaism had to say about diet, ecology, and the proper treatment of animals. The result was his best-known book, Judaism and Vegetarianism. It was first published in 1982, with later, expanded editions published in 1988 and 2001. It explores vegetarianism from the standpoint of biblical, Talmudic, and rabbinical references, and concludes that vegetarianism is the highest form of kosher and the best diet for Jews in the modern world. The second edition was a B'nai Brith Book Club Selection that same year.

Schwartz argues that the realities of animal-based diets and agriculture conflict with basic Jewish mandates to preserve human health, treat animals with compassion, protect the environment, conserve natural resources, help hungry people, and pursue peace. He has been active in a variety of vegetarian and animal rights organizations, and in July 2005 was inducted into the Vegetarian Hall of Fame by the North American Vegetarian Society (NAVS). The ceremony was held at the 31st Annual NAVS Summerfest on the University of Pittsburgh campus. Schwartz also spoke at the Summerfest on "Judaism and Vegetarianism" and "Ten Approaches to Obtain a Vegetarian-Conscious World by 2010."

In 2010, Schwartz served as a Green Zionist Alliance delegate to the World Zionist Congress.

Schwartz was involved in the formation of the Jewish Vegetarians of North America. He became president of the organization in 2002 and continues to serve as president emeritus.

Schwartz also reaches out to vegetarians from other religions, and his writings helped inspire the formation of the Christian Vegetarian Association, and their original campaign and literature, namely "What Would Jesus Eat...Today?" This campaign has more recently evolved into the broader "Honoring God's Creation" campaign and has strongly influenced the Christian vegetarian movement. He also is president of the interfaith group, "Society of Ethical and Religious Vegetarians" (SERV), which he cofounded.

== A Sacred Duty ==
Schwartz's writings inspired the 2007 documentary film, A Sacred Duty: Applying Jewish Values to Heal the World, directed by Lionel Friedberg. Schwartz and JVNA arranged to give away about 40,000 complimentary DVDs of the video and to have available online at aSacredDuty.com.

== Personal life ==
Schwartz married Loretta Susskind early in 1960. He is a Modern Orthodox Jew and belongs to the Young Israel Congregation of Staten Island, New York. Both are vegans, and they have three children and grandchildren.

== Publications ==
- Mathematics and Global Survival: Scarcity, hunger, population growth, pollution, waste 4th edition by Ginn Press, 1998.
- Judaism and Vegetarianism, 3rd edition by Lantern Books, New York, 2001. ISBN 1930051247
- Judaism and Global Survival, first published in 1984, 2nd edition by Lantern Books, New York, 2002. ISBN 1930051875
- Who Stole My Religion?: Revitalizing Judaism and Applying Jewish Values to Help Heal our Imperiled Planet, (with Rabbi Yonassan Gershom), Lulu Press, Raleigh, North Carolina, 2011. ISBN 978-1105336461
- Vegan Revolution: Saving Our World, Revitalizing Judaism, Lantern Publishing, 2020.

== See also ==
- Jews for Animal Rights
- Jewish vegetarianism
