= Yonassan Gershom =

American rabbi and author

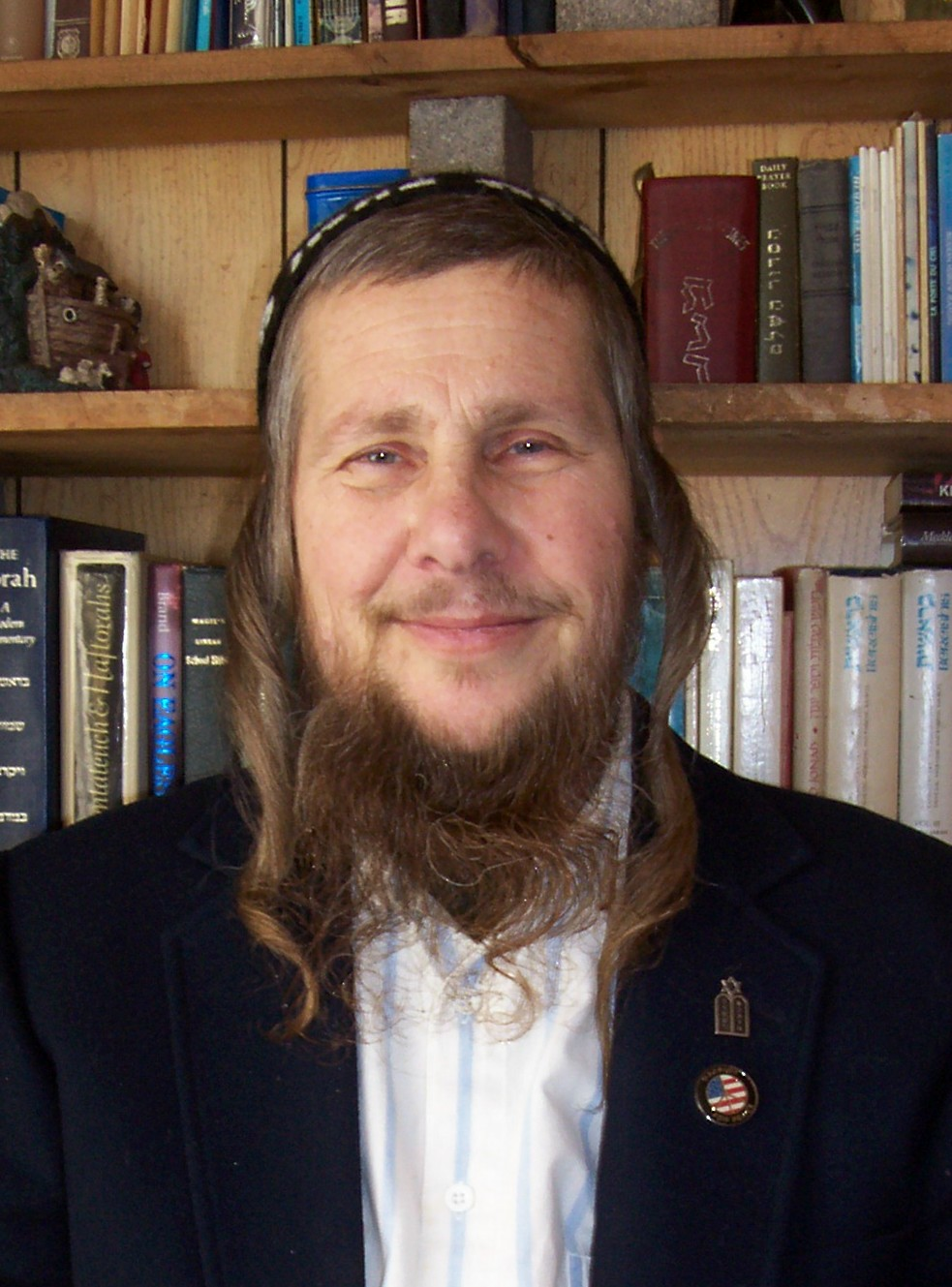
- Born: 1947 (age 78–79); Berkeley, California, U.S.
- Education: Minnesota State University, Mankato
- Occupations: Rabbi and writer
- Known for: Reincarnation research
- Spouse: Caryl Gershom

Yonassan Gershom (born 1947) is an American Rabbi and writer who was ordained in the Jewish Renewal movement during the 1980s, and is now a follower of Breslov Hasidism. He was associated with the early days of the B'nai Or movement, a forerunner of Jewish Renewal, in which he was ordained by Rabbi Zalman Schachter-Shalomi in 1986, although he is not in agreement with the direction that the movement has taken in more recent years.

== Life and career ==
Gershom lives on a farm in rural Minnesota, where he writes and conducts himself as a "cyber-rabbi" on the Internet. In 1997, he made a pilgrimage to the grave of Rabbi Nachman of Breslov in Uman, Ukraine, a trip that has strongly influenced his later writings. Until this point, "he wasn't aware how much the rural experience shaped Hasidism. It gave him a deeper understanding of Hasidic stories and the Torah." He has served on the advisory board of the Jewish Vegetarians of North America (JVNA), and is active in the vegetarian and animal welfare movements. In 2013, he was widely quoted as opposing the use of live chickens for Kapparot ceremonies.

Gershom is best known for having written several books on the topic of the Holocaust and reincarnation. Beyond the Ashes and From Ashes to Healing recount stories of people who claim to have died in the Holocaust and are now reincarnated, while Jewish Tales of Reincarnation deals with Jewish accounts of reincarnation, including a few from the Holocaust, but mostly others from classical Jewish texts and oral tradition.

In his books on reincarnation, Gershom discusses theories concerning whether Jews who died in the Holocaust did so as punishment for their sins in their previous lives. He argues that in the Jewish conception of evil and reincarnation (as opposed to the conception found in some other religions), suffering in this life is not necessarily punishment for wrongdoing in a previous life. Rather, he argues, undeserved suffering in this life can be purely due to the wrongdoing of the perpetrators, and not some punishment for the victims. He does, however, argue that, according to the Jewish concept, wickedness can be accumulated over a succession of reincarnations. Thus, he argues, it is possible that the Nazis committed the Holocaust due to the evil they had accumulated through many lifetimes of persecuting and killing Jews throughout the preceding centuries. He cites that Adolf Hitler might have been a reincarnation of the biblical Amalek.

Gershom has appeared on several TV programs in connection with his reincarnation work, including Sightings and Unexplained Mysteries. The Duluth, Minnesota, PBS station, WDSE, also featured him on their Venture North news magazine show, in connection with his philosophy on gardening and Jewish spirituality. He appears in the 2007 documentary film, A Sacred Duty: Applying Jewish Values to Help Heal the World, directed by Lionel Friedberg for the Jewish Vegetarians of North America (JVNA).

Although he is best known for his books on reincarnation, Gershom is also a life-long pacifist and peace activist, who has written many articles on Judaism and non-violence, later collected into an anthology entitled, Eight Candles of Consciousness. He was active in the peace movement in Minneapolis during the 1980s, and publicly protested against the policies of Meir Kahane. He is also a supporter of gay rights, basing his stance on equal rights under the law, rather than theology. He graduated from Mankato State University in 1975, with a Bachelor of Science degree in German language and Native American Studies.

== Personal life ==
During the 1990s, Gershom was diagnosed with Asperger syndrome and ADHD at the age of 45.

== Publications ==
On reincarnation:

- Beyond the Ashes: Cases of Reincarnation from the Holocaust, A.R.E. Press, 1992. (ISBN 0876042930)
- From Ashes to Healing: Mystical Encounters with the Holocaust, A.R.E. Press, 1996. (ISBN 0876043406)
- Jewish Tales of Reincarnation, Jason Aronson, Inc., 2000. (ISBN 0765760835)
- Are Holocaust Victims Returning?, ebook anthology of articles on reincarnation reprinted from various periodicals, 2007.

On other topics

- 49 Gates of Light: Kabbalistic Meditations for Counting the Omer, Crown Point Enterprises, Minneapolis, 1987, reprinted as 49 Gates of Light: a course in kabbalah, Lulu Press, Inc., 2010.
- "Shamanism in the Jewish Tradition", included in Nicholson, Shirley (ed.), Shamanism: An Expanded View of Reality, Quest Books, Wheaton, Illinois, 1996.
- "The Peace Stone" included in Seeing the Light: Personal Encounters with the Middle East and Islam, Curtis, Richard H. and McMahon, Janet (eds.), American Educational Trust, Washington, D. C., 1997.
- Eight Candles of Consciousness: Essays on Jewish Non-Violence, Lulu Press, Inc., Raleigh, N. C., 2009. (ISBN 978-0-557-04922-6)
- Jewish Themes in Star Trek, Lulu Press, Inc., Raleigh, N. C., 2009. (ISBN 978-0-557-04800-7)
- Two dialogues with him on animal rights issues in Judaism ("Raising Holy Sparks: Hasidic Thought and Vegetarianism", and "A Dialogue on Nature Deficit Disorder") are included in Who Stole My Religion?: Revitalizing Judaism and Applying Jewish Values to Help Heal our Imperiled Planet by Richard H. Schwartz, Lulu Press, Inc., Raleigh, N. C., 2011. (ISBN 978-1-105-33646-1)
- Kapporos Then and Now: Toward a More Compassionate Tradition, Lulu Press, Inc., 2015. (ISBN 978-1-329-18940-9)
- "Spock and Jews in the 1960s", included in Spockology:Essays on Spock and Leonard Nimoy from The Undiscovered Country Project and Friends, Neece, Kvin C. (editor), Createspace, 2015. (ISBN 978-1506108179)
- "Rabbi Birds and Rooster Chicks: How I Became a Vegetarian", included in Yanklowitz, Schmuly, The Jewish Vegan, Shamyim v'Aretz Institute, 2015. (ISBN 978-1517393021)
- "Antisemitic Stereotypes in Alice Bailey's Writings", 1997–2005.

== See also ==
- Jewish vegetarianism
