= Bal tashchit =

Ethical principle in Jewish law

Bal tashchit (Hebrew: בַּל תַּשְׁחִית, lit. 'do not destroy') is an ethical principle in Jewish law (Halakha). The principle is derived from a law revealed by God to Moses recorded in Deuteronomy 20:19–20:

When in your war against a city you have to besiege it a long time in order to capture it, you must not destroy its trees, wielding the ax against them. You may eat of them, but you must not cut them down. Are trees of the field human to withdraw before you into the besieged city? Only trees that you know do not yield food may be destroyed; you may cut them down for constructing siegeworks against the city that is waging war on you, until it has been reduced.

In the Hebrew Bible, the command is given in the context of wartime and forbids cutting down fruit trees to assist in a siege.

In early Rabbinic law, however, the bal tashchit principle is understood to include other forms of senseless damage or waste. For instance, the Babylonian Talmud applies the principle to prevent the wasting of lamp oil, the tearing of clothing, the chopping up of furniture for firewood, or the killing of animals. In his explanation of this law, the Chinuch (Mitzvah 529) writes that "it is the practice of very righteous people not to waste anything, even a grain of mustard".

The logic behind this principle is that if even in a time of war one could not destroy fruit trees, all the more so should one not destroy or waste anything under normal circumstances. The Talmud even goes so far as to state that "...one who tears his clothes or breaks his vessels or scatters his money in anger should be considered like an idol worshipper (see b.Shabbat 105b; cf. also, b.Shabbat 67b)."

However, even though this moral principle could hardly be formulated more powerfully, in all cases bal tashchit is invoked only for destruction deemed unnecessary. Destruction is explicitly condoned when the cause or need is adequate. For example, the law as codified determined that if one could profit more from cutting down a fruit tree and selling its wood than from leaving it standing and harvesting its fruit, this did not count as wasting (b. Baba Qama 91b–92a, Mishneh Torah Shofetim, Hilkhot Melakhim 6:9).

Modern-day applications of this law include injunctions against food waste.

In contemporary Jewish ethics on Judaism and ecology, advocates often point to bal tashchit as an environmental principle. (Jewish vegetarians also point to bal tashchit as one justification for vegetarianism or veganism, arguing that eating meat and raising animals in general is wasteful.) Nevertheless, although bal tashchit may be broadly applied to environmental ethics, its limitation in the case where one may profit through a destructive act makes the application of the laws of bal tashchit to environmental issues complicated.

Eilon Schwartz examines these limitations of bal tashchit in his work. Both David Mevorach Seidenberg and Tanhum Yoreh have proposed ways to buttress the law of bal tashchit so that it may play a more meaningful role in the development of Jewish environmental ethics.

== Sources ==
- Coalition on the Environment and Jewish Life. Bal Tashchit: the development of a Jewish environmental principle.
- Maimonides, Mishneh Torah, Laws of Kings and Wars 6:8,10.
- Nachman, Candace. "Bal Tashchit: Optimism in a Time of Teshuva" on the Canfei Nesharim website, an Orthodox Jewish environmental organization.
- Nir, David. "A Critical Examination of the Jewish Environmental Law of Bal Tashchit 'Do Not Destroy'" Georgetown International Environmental Law Review, Winter, 2006.
- Sefer ha-Chinuch, commandment 529.
- Schwartz, Eilon. "Bal Tashchit: A Jewish Environmental Precept," in Judaism And Environmental Ethics: A Reader Martin D. Yaffe ed., 2001.
- Seidenberg, David. "Bal Tashchit: What’s Wrong With the Jewish Law Against Destruction and Waste — and How to Fix It" (Sept 8, 2016), on Tikkun website.
- Stein, David E. S. "Halakhah: The Law of Bal Tashchit (Do Not Destroy)," in Torah of the Earth.
- Wolff, K.A. "Bal Tashchit: The Jewish Prohibition against Needless Destruction" at http://hdl.handle.net/1887/14448.
- Yoreh, Tanhum. Waste Not: A Jewish Environmental Ethic, SUNY Press, 2019.

== See also ==
- 613 Mitzvot
- Mottainai
