= Fania Lewando =

Polish chef and restaurateur (1888–1941)

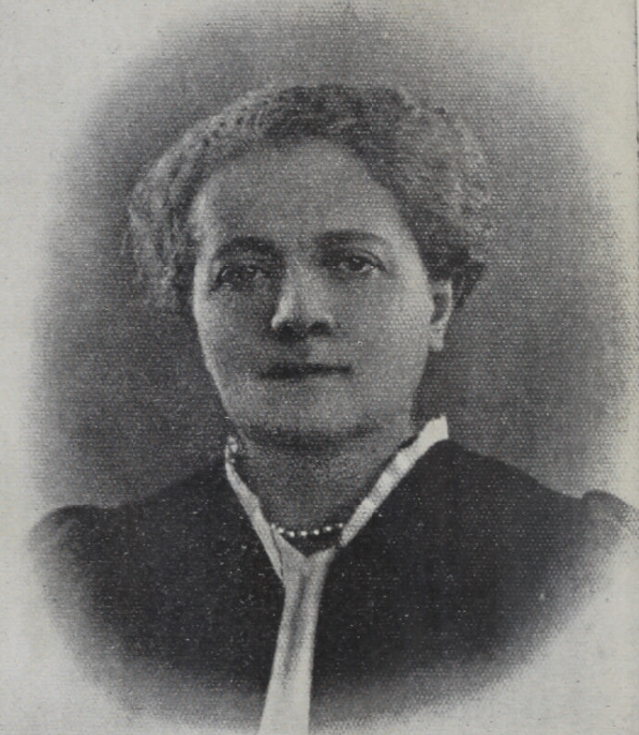
Fanni Levando from Vegetarish-Dietisher Kokhbukh

Fania Lewando (Yiddish: פֿאַני לעװאַנדאָ, née Fiszelewicz, 1888–1941) was a Polish-Jewish vegetarian chef, restaurateur, nutritionist, and cookbook author from Vilnius. She operated a vegetarian restaurant called Dieto-Jarska Jadłodajnia and in 1938 was author of a Yiddish language vegetarian cookbook in Europe.

== Biography ==
She was born in 1888 or 1889 in Włocławek, Warsaw Governorate, Russian Empire (today located in Kuyavian-Pomeranian Voivodeship, Poland). Her parents were Haim Efraim Fiszelewicz, a fishmonger, and Esther-Malka (née Stulzaft). Most of her family emigrated to England or the United States at around the turn of the twentieth century. She married an egg merchant named Lazar Lewando. During the Russian Civil War they relocated to Vilnius, and attempted to emigrate to the United States, but were refused a visa.

In 1936, Lewando was asked to manage a kosher restaurant aboard the MS Batory, a transatlantic liner of the Gdynia-America Line.

Lewando came to be well known in Vilnius for her vegetarian restaurant Dieto-Jarska Jadłodajnia which was located on Niemiecka street 14 (present-day Vokiečių Street) in the Jewish Quarter; it had a number of bohemian and celebrity guests including the artist Marc Chagall and the songwriter Itzik Manger. She also operated a cooking school which was located a few blocks away. She published her Yiddish-language vegetarian cookbook in 1938. It contained a number of Jewish cooking recipes adapted for a vegetarian diet, and was exported to England and the United States. She attempted to market the recipes to the H. J. Heinz Company.

Lewando and her husband were killed in 1941 during the Nazi invasion of the Soviet Union.

In 2017 the German artist Gunter Demnig installed Stolperstein for the Lewandos in Vilnius.

== Cookbook ==
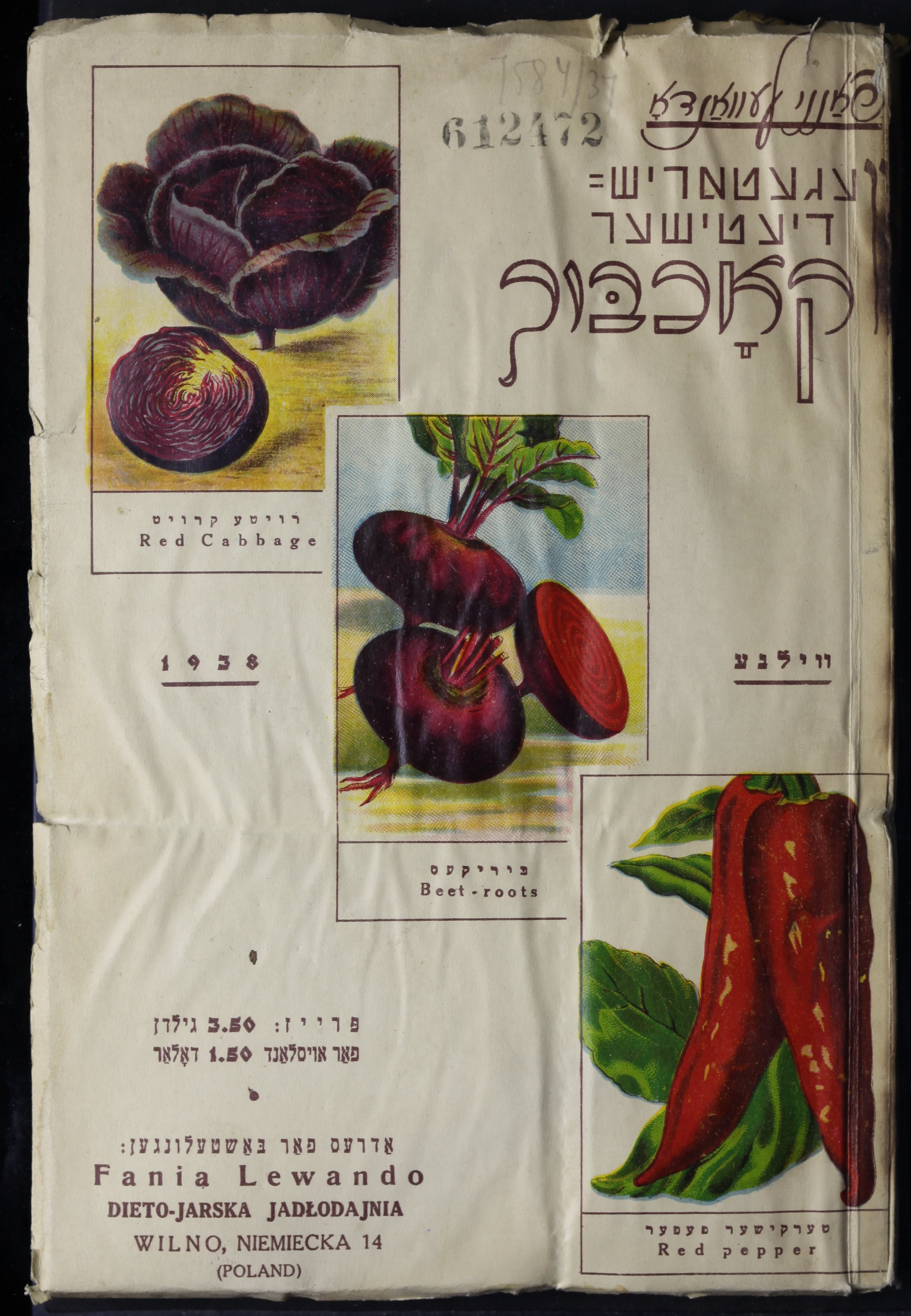
Vegetarish-Dietisher Kokhbukh cover (1938)

- Original Yiddish version: װעגעטאריש דיעטישער קאכבוך: 400 שפייזן געמאכט אויסשליסלעך פון גרינסן (Ṿegeṭarish-dieṭisher kokhbukh: 400 shpayzn gemakht oysshlishlekh fun grinsn). Vilnius: Druk. Inż. G. Kleckina, 1938.
- English translation: The Vilna Vegetarian Cookbook. Garden-Fresh Recipes Rediscovered and Adapted for Today's Kitchen, translated by Eve Jochnowitz, with a preface by Joan Nathan. Schocken Books, New York City 2015, (ISBN 978-0-8052-4327-7).
- Polish translation and adaptation: Dietojarska kuchnia żydowska Znak, 2020, (ISBN 978-8324071937).
