= Geoffrey Claussen =

American rabbi and scholar

Academic background
- Education: Carleton College, Jewish Theological Seminary
- Website: geoffreyclaussen.com

Geoffrey Claussen is an American rabbi and scholar who is a professor of religious studies at Elon University. His scholarship focuses on Jewish ethics, theology, and the Musar movement.

== Education ==
Claussen received his BA in Classical Languages from Carleton College. He was ordained as a rabbi and received his M.A. and Ph.D. from the Jewish Theological Seminary of America.

== Career ==
Claussen joined the Elon faculty in August 2011 as an assistant professor of religious studies. In April 2012, he was named the Lori and Eric Sklut Emerging Scholar in Jewish Studies. He is also the founding director of Elon's Jewish Studies program, which launched in fall 2012.

Claussen was president of the Society of Jewish Ethics from 2015 to 2017.

== Jewish Veganism ==
In 2017, Claussen was one of the rabbis who signed a statement by Jewish Veg encouraging veganism for all Jews. Claussen has argued that teachings of the Musar movement may enrich Jewish vegan practices today.

== Scholarship ==
Claussen has been noted for his book Sharing the Burden: Rabbi Simhah Zissel Ziv and the Path of Musar. Christian B. Miller claimed that in his book, Claussen "succeeded in making the teachings of Simhah Zissel Ziv relevant today, both to contemporary Jewish ethics and, I would argue, to other traditions of both secular and religious thought about morality." Claussen's work has also pointed to the significance of the 21st century revival of the Musar movement and the value of a virtue-centered approach to moral reasoning. His articles and book chapters include:

- “Musar and Jewish Veganism.” In Jewish Veganism and Vegetarianism: Studies and New Directions, ed. Jacob Labendz and Shmuly Yanklowitz (SUNY Press, 2019), 195–216.
- “‘I Will Be With Them’: God at the Burning Bush as an Ideal of Compassion for all Creatures.” In Ehyeh Asher Ehyeh, ed. David Birnbaum and Martin S. Cohen (New Paradigm Matrix Publishing, 2019).
- “The Exodus and Some Possibilities of Jewish Political Thought,” co-authored with Emily Filler. In T&T Clark Companion to Political Theology, ed. Rubén Rosario Rodriguez (T&T Clark, 2019).
- “War, Musar, and the Construction of Humility in Modern Jewish Thought.” Interreligious Studies and Interreligious Theology, vol. 2, no. 2 (2018): 216–242.
- “Two Orthodox Approaches to Vulnerability and the Exodus Narrative: The Stranger in the Writings of Irving Greenberg and Meir Kahane.” Studies in Judaism, Humanities, and the Social Sciences vol. 2, no. 1 (2018): 46–60.
- “Constructing Interreligious Studies: Thinking Critically about Interfaith Studies and the Interfaith Movement,” co-authored with Amy Allocco and Brian Pennington. In Interreligious/Interfaith Studies: Defining a New Field, ed. Eboo Patel, Jennifer Peace, and Noah Silverman (Beacon Press, 2018), 36–48.
- “Angels, Humans, and the Struggle for Moral Excellence in the Writings of Meir Simhah of Dvinsk and Simhah Zissel of Kelm." In Jewish Religious and Philosophical Ethics, ed. Curtis Hutt, Halla Kim, and Berel Dov Lerner (Routledge, 2018), 27–50.
- “Repairing Character Traits and Repairing the Jews: The Talmud Torahs of Kelm and Grobin in the Nineteenth Century.” Polin: Studies in Polish Jewry, vol. 30, no. 1 (2018): 15–41.
- “The Promise and Limits of R. Simhah Zissel Ziv’s Musar: A Response to Miller, Cooper, Pugh, and Peters." Journal of Jewish Ethics, vol. 3, no. 1 (2017): 154–177.
- “The Kaddish, the Allegory of the Cave, and the Golden Calf: Meditations on Education and the Encounter with God.” In Kaddish, ed. David Birnbaum and Martin S. Cohen (New Paradigm Matrix Publishing, 2016), 307–336.
- "The Legacy of the Kelm School of Musar on Questions of Work, Wealth and Poverty.” In Wealth and Poverty in Jewish Tradition, ed. Leonard J. Greenspoon (Purdue University Press, 2015), 151–184.
- “A Jewish Perspective on War, Scripture, and Moral Accounting.” Journal of Scriptural Reasoning, vol. 14, no. 1 (2015): 1–15. (Also reprinted in Virtue Ethics, ed. Tom Angier [Routledge, 2018], 2:169–185.)
- “Pinhas, the Quest for Purity, and the Dangers of Tikkun Olam.” In Tikkun Olam: Judaism, Humanism & Transcendence, ed. David Birnbaum and Martin S. Cohen (New Paradigm Matrix Publishing, 2015), 475–501.
- “Introducing Jewish Studies through Jewish Thought and Practice.” Shofar, vol. 32, no. 4 (2014): 60–75.
- “Musar.” In Enzyklopädie Jüdischer Geschichte und Kultur, ed. Dan Diner (Stuttgart: J.B. Metzler, 2013), 4:268–274.
- “The Practice of Musar.” Conservative Judaism, vol. 63, no. 2 (2012): 3–26. (Also translated into Spanish and re-printed as “La práctica del Musar,” trans. Rodrigo Varscher, in Maj'shavot [Pensamientos], vol. 54 [2015]: 1–30.)
- “Jewish Virtue Ethics and Compassion for Animals: A Model from the Musar Movement.” CrossCurrents, vol. 61, no. 2 (2011): 208–216.
- “God and Suffering in Heschel’s Torah Min Ha-Shamayim.” Conservative Judaism, vol. 61, no. 4 (2010): 17–42.
- “Sharing the Burden: Rabbi Simhah Zissel Ziv on Love and Empathy.” Journal of the Society of Christian Ethics, vol. 30, no. 2 (2010): 151–169.
- “The American Jewish Revival of Musar.” The Hedgehog Review, vol. 12, no. 2 (2010): 63–72.
