= Aryeh Cohen =

American rabbi and scholar

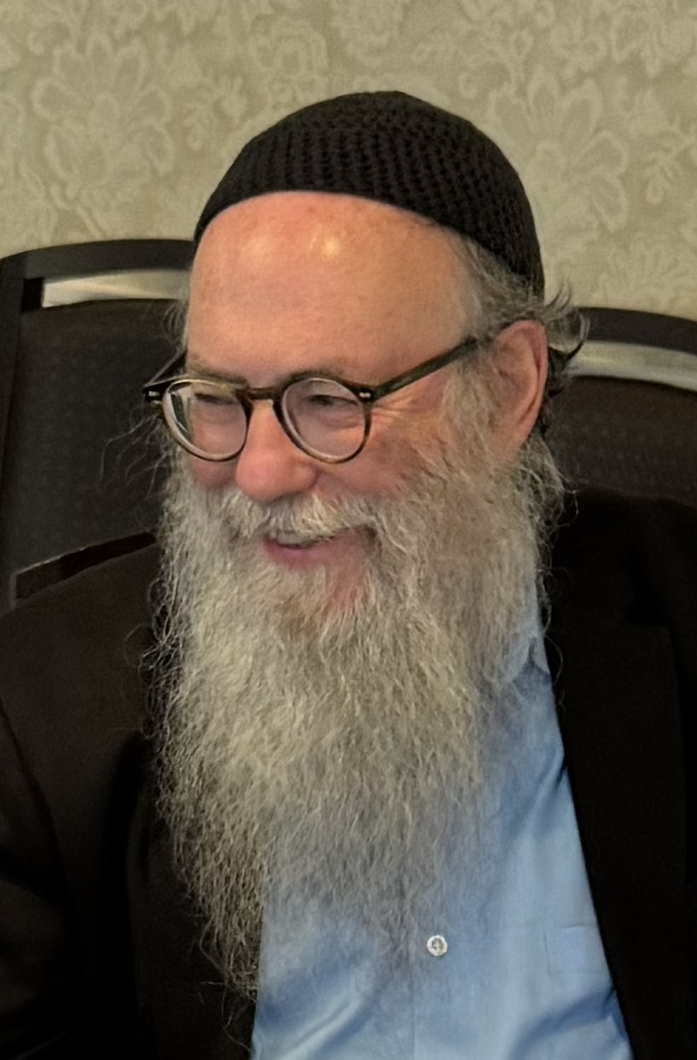
Aryeh Cohen at the "Jews and Black Theory" conference, May 2024, Harvard University.

Aryeh Cohen is an American rabbi and scholar who serves as a professor of Rabbinic Literature at American Jewish University. His scholarship focuses on the Talmud, Jewish ethics, and social justice.

== Education ==
Cohen received his BA in Philosophy and Jewish Thought from the Hebrew University of Jerusalem. He was ordained as a rabbi by the Ziegler School of Rabbinic Studies and received his Ph.D. from Brandeis University.

== Career ==
Cohen has held appointments at American Jewish University since 1995. He was Chair of Jewish Studies in the College of Arts and Science from 1995 to 2000 and Chair of Rabbinic Studies in the Ziegler School from 2001 to 2005.

Cohen has also taught at Hebrew Union College/Jewish Institute of Religion, the Reconstructionist Rabbinical College and at Brandeis University.

== Activism ==
Cohen is also the Rabbi-in-Residence for Bend the Arc: A Jewish Partnership for Justice in Southern California. He has been active in protesting deportations carried out by ICE and “zero tolerance” US immigration policies.

In 2017, Cohen was one of the rabbis who signed a statement by Jewish Veg encouraging veganism for all Jews.

Cohen is one of the founders of the Shtibl minyan.

== Scholarship ==
Cohen is the author of Rereading Talmud: Gender, Law and the Poetics of Sugyot and Justice in the City: An Argument from the Sources of Rabbinic Judaism. Rabbi Alana Suskin has described Justice in the City as essential reading for the Occupy movement. Cohen is also co-editor of Beginning/Again: Towards a Hermeneutics of Jewish Texts. He has also written about modern figures including Aharon Shmuel Tamares and Emmanuel Levinas. Andrew Flescher has argued that Cohen's work on Tamares and Levinas "makes a compelling case in his own right for the counter-productive nature of violence under all circumstances."

His articles and book chapters include:

- “‘The Foremost Amongst the Divine Attributes Is to Hate the Vulgar Power of Violence’: Aharon Shmuel Tamares and Recovering Nonviolence for Jewish Ethics,” Journal of Jewish Ethics, vol. 2.
- “Justice, Wealth, Taxes: A View from the Perspective of Rabbinic Judaism,” Journal of Religious Ethics.
- “Hagar and Ishmael: A Commentary,” Interpretation: A Journal of Bible and Theolog, 68:3 (2014).
- “Land and Messianism,” Journal of Scriptural Reasoning Volume 10.1.
- “A Response to Menachem Fisch’s ‘Berakhot 19b: The Bavli’s Paradigm of Confrontational Discourse’,” The Journal of Textual Reasoning, Volume 4.2.
- “Why Textual “Reasoning”?” Journal of Textual Reasoning (2002): 1.1.
- “Giddul’s Wife and the Power of the Court: On Talmudic Law, Gender, Divorce and Exile,” RLAWS: Review of Law, Women and Society, Volume 9.2.
- “‘This Patriarchy Which is Not One’: The Ideology of Marriage in Rashi and Tosafot, Hebrew Union College Annual. Volume 70 (1999).
- “‘Do the dead know…’ The Representation of Death in the Bavli,” AJS Review, vol. xxiv, no 1, 1999.
- “Towards an Erotics of Martyrdom,” The Journal of Jewish Thought and Philosophy, Volume 7, Number 2 1997.
- “The Violence of Poverty,” in Wealth and Poverty in the Jewish Tradition, Studies in Jewish Civilization, Vol. 26, ed. Leonard J. Greenspoon, Purdue University Press (2015).
- “The Divine Voice of the People,” Cross Currents, September, 2014, 404–409
- “The Gender of Shabbat,” in Introduction to Seder Kodashim, ed. Tal Ilan, Monika Brockhaus and Tanja Hidde, Mohr-Siebeck (2012)
- “The Sage and the Other Woman: A Rabbinic Tragedy,” in The Passionate Torah: Sex and Judaism, ed. Danya Ruttenberg, NYU (2009).
- “Hearing the Cry of the Poor,” in Crisis, Call, and Leadership in the Abrahamic Traditions, ed. Peter Ochs and William Stacy Johnson Palgrave Macmillan, (2009).
- “Beginning Gittin/Mapping Exile,” in Beginning/Again: Toward a Hermeneutics of Jewish Texts, ed. Aryeh Cohen and Shaul Magid, Seven Bridges Press (2002).
- “The Task of the Talmud: On Talmud as Translation,” in A.A. den Hollander, Ulrich Schmid, Willem Smelik, eds. Paratext and Megatext as Channels of Jewish and Christian Traditions: The Textual Markers of Contextualization, E.J. Brill, 2003.
- “Response to ‘Revelation Revealed’,” in Textual Reasonings, ed. Nancy Levene and Peter Ochs SCM Press, 2002.

Cohen has presented at many academic conferences. In May 2024, he spoke on a panel "The Black-Jewish Alliance: Its History, Demise, and Possible Futures" at a "Jews and Black Theory" conference at Harvard.
