= Shefa Gold =

American rabbi and musician

- Born: Sherri Katz; New York City, New York, U.S.
- Education: Ramapo College; Goddard College; Reconstructionist Rabbinical College
- Occupation: Rabbi
- Spouse: Rachmiel O'Regan
- Website: www.rabbishefagold.com

Shefa Gold (born April 8,1954) is an American rabbi, scholar, and Director of the Center for Devotional, Energy and Ecstatic Practice (C-DEEP) in Jemez Springs, New Mexico. Gold is a teacher of chant, Jewish mysticism, Jewish prayer and spirituality who Rabbi Mike Comins described in 2010 as "a pioneer in the ecstatic practice of Jewish chant." Her chants have been used in synagogues, minyanim, and street protests; perhaps her most well known being "Ozi V'zimrat Yah". Combining traditional Jewish liturgical music with Hebrew chant, Gold has worked to cultivate a distinctly Jewish gratitude practice. Her "Flavors of Gratefulness" mobile app has 130 different chants for Modeh Ani, the brief prayer traditionally recited by religious Jews upon awakening. In 2024 she released "Flavors of Praise" with 72 different chants.

Prior to her rabbinical training, Gold worked as a musician. She said in a 2013 interview, "What I was really trying to do with my music was create sacred space. I felt how powerful music is in opening hearts." During her training at the Reconstructionist Rabbinical College, she took time off to study Zen meditation practices (including chant). During a 1993 retreat led by Thích Nhât Hanh at the Omega Institute, Gold co-led a Rosh Hashanah service as many of the participants were Jewish. By the time Gold was ordained as a rabbi in 1996, she had integrated Hebrew chant into her spiritual practice and, ultimately, her rabbinate (ministry). She is a leader within ALEPH: the Alliance for Jewish Renewal, and received ordination from Rabbi Zalman Schachter-Shalomi in addition to her Reconstructionist one. Through a program named Kol Zimra, Gold has trained rabbis, cantors, and lay leaders in Hebrew chant practices. According to one Jewish Telegraphic Agency article, nearly all interest in Jewish chanting today can be traced back to Gold. She was included in Letty Cottin Pogrebin's 2007 list, The Other Fifty Rabbis in America, a 2015 list of "America's most inspiring rabbis" by The Forward, and has been quoted in articles that discuss the intersection of New Age spirituality and Judaism.

Gold has produced ten albums, and her liturgies have been published in several prayerbooks.

She is the author of several books on deepening spiritual awareness through sacred chant and meditation.

Gold's work was featured in the book Stalking Elijah: Adventures with Today's Jewish Mystical Masters by Rodger Kamenetz.

In 2017, Gold was one of the rabbis who signed a statement by Jewish Veg encouraging Jews to take up a vegan lifestyle.

Gold has described Hebrew chant as effective for healing and transforming people of different religions, not just adherents of Judaism.

== Selected publications ==
- Gold, Shefa (2006). Torah Journeys: An Inner Path to the Promised Land. Ben Yehuda Press. ISBN 978-0-9769862-6-3.
- Gold, Shefa (2008). In the Fever of Love: An Illumination of the Song of Songs. Ben Yehuda Press. ISBN 978-1-934730-26-3.
- Gold, Shefa (2013). The Magic of Hebrew Chant: Healing the Spirit, Transforming the Mind, Deepening Love. Jewish Lights Publishing. ISBN 978-1-58023-671-3.
- Gold, Shefa (2019). Are We There Yet?: Travel as a Spiritual Practice. Jewish Lights Publishing. ISBN 978-1-934730-72-0.
