= Simchah Roth =

Israeli rabbi and scholar

Simchah Roth שמחה רוט

Personal life
- Died: 2012 Herzliyya, Israel
- Occupation: Rabbi and scholar

Religious life
- Religion: Judaism
- Synagogue: WUJS Institute

Simchah Roth (Hebrew: שמחה רוט; died 2012) was an Israeli rabbi and a scholar who edited the first prayer book of the Masorti movement. He advocated veganism.

== Career ==
Roth moved to Israel in 1969, serving as the rabbi and resident lecturer of the WUJS Institute in Arad and later taught in the town of Yeroham. In 1989, Roth moved to Herzliyya, where he served as the rabbi of Torat Hayyim Masorti Congregation from 1989 until his retirement from that position in July 2007.

Roth served as a member of the Herzliyya Mo'etzah Datit, the Municipal Religious Council. He also held several posts in the Rabbinical Assembly in Israel such as the Va'ad Halakhah (Law Committee), the vice-president and a past member of the Executive Committee. He has been the chairperson of the Religious Services Bureau of the Masorti Movement.

Roth was the editor of the first Masorti prayer book, Siddur Va'ani Tefillati. He is known for his attempts to reconcile four characteristics in this prayer book namely - Masorti (Conservative), Israeli-Zionist, pluralistic, and innovative. According to the analysis of David Ellenson, Roth's prayer book says that "the demands of the past are not absolute, nor is Jewish liturgical tradition frozen. The claims and sensibilities of the present are vital as well."

== Notable rulings ==
Over the course of his career, Roth issued a number of notable rabbinic rulings.

- 2003 - He ruled that homosexuality was not forbidden by biblical law and that rabbinical schools should be open to gay and lesbian Jews.
- 2005 - He ruled that, at Passover time, chametz should be donated to needy non-Jews.
- 2007 - He ruled that kissing mezuzahs should be avoided, in order to avoid the risk of contracting an infectious disease.
- 2009 - Roth ruled that a Torah scroll written by a woman is permissible for use in a communal synagogue. He said that since contemporary rabbis today obligate women in the learning of Torah, they should certainly be eligible to write a scroll.

== Veganism ==
In 2010, Roth said that Jews should adopt a vegan diet, based on four arguments:

- Modern mass-slaughter of animals constitutes cruelty to animals (tza'ar ba'alei hayyim) which is forbidden by the Torah
- Consumption of animal products as we moderns do contravenes the command of the Torah to maintain ourselves in good health
- Religious Jews should stop eating animal products (meat, eggs, milk etc.) in order to lessen greatly the damage we are doing to the planet
- If religious Jews adopt a vegan diet, they will be greatly contributing to promoting righteousness and justice in the world and to a hastening of the messianic age.
