= Asa Keisar =

Israeli advocate for veganism

- אסא קיסר
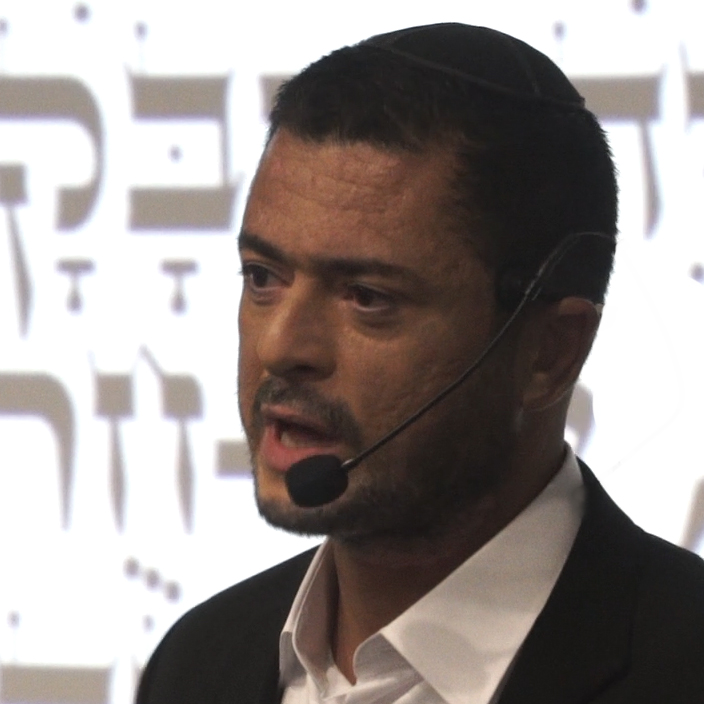
- Keisar at the Kibbutzim College in 2014
- Born: September 1, 1973 (age 52); Kiryat Ono, Israel
- Years active: 2014-present
- Known for: Vegan advocacy
- Children: 4
- Website: asakeisar.com

Asa Keisar (Hebrew: אסא קיסר; born September 1, 1973) is an Israeli Jewish religious scholar, rabbi, scribe, and advocate for veganism. He has given many public lectures across Israel in support of veganism as both a Torah imperative to avoid cruelty to animals, as well as it being the Torah's ideal for mankind.

== Early life and education ==
Keisar was born and raised in a National Religious home in Kiryat Ono, Israel. He is of Yemenite Jewish ancestry. He was raised vegetarian and later became a vegan. He served in the Israeli army, and later studied at a Haredi yeshiva in Israel.

== Vegan advocacy ==
Keisar became a vegan after learning about the widespread animal welfare issues present in egg and dairy factory farms. In 2015, he wrote the book Velifnei Iver (translated as Before the Blind, in reference to the commandment in the Book of Leviticus, "Do not put a stumbling block before the blind"). In the book he makes the case that eating meat and animal byproducts is no longer permitted according to Jewish sources, because of the cruelty inflicted on animals by the modern mass production of meat, dairy and eggs. The book has also been translated into English.

Based on Biblical, Talmudic and halachic (Jewish law) sources, Keisar's stance is that veganism is a Torah ideal, and Jews should therefore follow a vegan diet. He argues that although eating meat is permitted, not everything permitted in the Torah should necessarily be done, and the Torah permits eating meat only as a concession, in the same way the Torah permits such antiquated deeds as owning slaves or having relations with a woman outside of marriage during a time of war. Keisar encourages Israelis to consume a plant-based diet due to the animal welfare issues surrounding slaughterhouses, chicken coops, egg farms and dairy farms. He states that contemporary factory farm animal abuses violate Jewish law. He uses classical Jewish sources to argue that the Torah's prohibitions of cruelty to animals apply to today's factory farms, and that consumption of these animals or their products are in violation of Jewish law.

In addition to interviews in mainstream Israeli media, his book Velifnei Iver was distributed in 2016 to yeshivas throughout Israel. Keisar also presents a ten-minute lecture on the subject, Religious Veganism, discussing what the Torah, Talmud and scholars have to say about meat consumption. He has given the lecture at universities, high schools and yeshivas across Israel. A video of the lecture posted on YouTube in 2018, as well as a two-minute version of it, have each been viewed over two million times as of September 2018. On November 15, 2017, the President of Israel, Reuven Rivlin, wrote a letter to Keisar in appreciation of his work regarding veganism and animal suffering as a moral and Jewish imperative.

His second book, Velifnei Iver Hashalem, was published in 2018 and was also distributed for free to yeshivas. It includes 100 pages with extensions and fixes to the first book, which had 53 pages. The book has got approbations from Rabbi Moshe Zuriel, Rabbi Daniel Sperber, Rabbi David Rosen and Rabbi Nathan Lopes Cardozo.

In 2020, Kaiser established the kosher symbol Vegan Kosher, which offers companies a vegan kosher certificate, ensuring products are both free from animal exploitation and produced according to Jewish law. The label is administered by Orthodox Jewish rabbis from Israel.

== Documentary ==
Keisar participated in filming a documentary, Holy Vegans, which began filming in 2016 and is about vegans and vegan culture in Israel. As of 2023, the film was still in production.

== Personal life ==
Keisar lives in Petah Tikva, Israel. He has four children.

== Bibliography ==
=== Books ===
- Velifnei Iver (2015)

=== Lectures ===
- Religious Veganism (2018)
