= Lionel Friedberg =

South African film director

- Citizenship: South Africa
- Occupations: documentary film director, producer and writer
- Awards: Emmy Awards, Silver Screen Award

Lionel Friedberg is a documentary film director, producer and writer who has written or produced films for, among others, Discovery Channel, Animal Planet, PBS, the History Channel and National Geographic. He has 18 credits as Director of Photography on feature motion pictures, and has worked all over the world on both dramatic and nonfiction productions.

Friedberg was born in South Africa. He began his career working in the television industry in Northern Rhodesia (now Zambia) in 1961. He later directed numerous TV episodes and single dramas and documentaries in South Africa and was the Chairman of the South African Film and Television Association (SAFFTA) for many years. In 1966 he worked in Canada, where he was affiliated with the National Film Board of Canada, Montreal. In 1986 he moved to the United States. For the past 30 years he has specialized in fiction and non-fiction series, episodes and single shows, as well as writing non-fiction books. He is an Emmy Award-winning cinematographer, an author of three non-fiction books and a New York Times bestselling author. He is a vegan and active in the environmental and animal welfare movements.

== Partial filmography ==
- Max Steiner: Maestro of Movie Music (Writer) (2020)
- Scotty and the Secret History of Hollywood (Executive Producer) (2017)
- A Sacred Duty: Helping to Heal the World (2007)
- Growing Up Animal Planet (2004 - 2007)
- History's Mysteries History Channel, (1994 - 1998)
- Mysteries of the Bible A&E Channel (1994 - 1998)
- The Shape of Life National Geographic/PBS (1999 - 2000)
- Beyond Death (A&E) (1998)
- Vigilantes (History Channel) (1996)
- Mysteries Underground National Geographic (1992)
- The Infinite Voyage PBS (1988-1991)
- Sail on, Voyager! PBS (1990)
- Across the Rubicon CPB (1986)
- The Tribal Identity SABC (1975)
- House of the Living Dead (feature film - cinematographer) (1973)
- Shangani Patrol (feature film - cinematographer) (1970)
- Strangers at Sunrise (feature film - cinematographer) (1968)
- The Long Red Shadow (feature film - cinematographer) (1967)

== Books ==
• Full Service (Grove Press) (2012) New York Times bestseller. Co-written with Scotty Bowers

• Forever in my Veins: How Film Led Me to the Mysterious World of the African Shaman (O-Books. John Hunt) (2020)

• The Flying Springbok: A History of South African Airways Since Its Inception to the Post-Apartheid Era (Chronos Books. John Hunt) (2021)

== Awards ==
- 2006: Silver Screen Award - World on a String - The Sacred Bead
- 2005: Cine Golden Eagle Award - World on a String - The Eternal Bead
- 2005: Silver Screen Award World on a String - The Eternal Bead
- 1997: Golden Eagle Award The Bible's Greatest Mysteries (Supervising Producer)
- 1996: Nominee. Cable Ace Award Mysteries of the Bible (Supervising Producer)
- 1996: Public Information Radio & Television Educational Society Buccaneer Award Windows Through Time (Producer/Writer/Director)
- 1995: Nominee. Cable Ace Award Mysteries of the Bible (Supervising Producer)
- 1994: Ohio Governor's State Award Mysteries Underground (Producer/Writer/Director)
- 1993: National Primetime Emmy Award Mysteries Underground (Cinematographer)
- 1993: National Television Academy News and Documentary Award - Mysteries Underground (Producer)
- 1993: Columbus International Chris Award Mysteries Underground (Producer/Writer/Director)
- 1993: Eastman Kodak Award Mysteries Underground (Cinematographer)
- 1991: Columbus International Chris Award Sail On, Voyager! (Producer/Writer/Director)
- 1991: Golden Eagle Award Sail On, Voyager! (Producer/Writer/Director)
- 1991: Birmingham International Environmental Electra Award Crisis in the Atmosphere (Producer/Writer/Director)
- 1990: Golden Eagle Award Crisis in the Atmosphere (Producer/Writer/Director)
- 1990: American Association for the Advancement of Science Westinghouse Award The Great Dinosaur Hunt (a part of the documentary TV series The Infinite Voyage, Producer/Writer/Director)
- 1990: Columbus International Chris Award The Great Dinosaur Hunt (a part of the documentary TV series The Infinite Voyage, Producer/Writer/Director)
- 1985: Argus Star Tonight Award Hell on Earth (Director)
- 1985: Eastman Kodak Visible Spectrum Award A Delicate Balance (Cinematographer)
- 1984: Argus Star Tonight Award Then Came the English (Director)
- 1978: International Anthropological Festival Grand Prix du Festival The Cultural Identity (Director/Cinematographer)
- 1977: Argus Star Tonight Award The Tribal Identity (Director/Writer/Cinematographer)
