= Raysh Weiss =

American rabbi

Raysh Weiss (born 1984) is a Co-Senior Rabbi of Temple Israel of Natick, MA. Previously, Weiss served as Senior Rabbi of Beth El of Bucks County in Yardley, PA and as the spiritual leader of Shaar Shalom Synagogue in Halifax, Nova Scotia, as well as the Jewish chaplain at Dalhousie University and University of King's College. Weiss is also the founder and director of YentaNet and is a social activist; a musician; and a published author on popular and academic subjects for such media as Tablet Magazine, JewSchool, Zeramim: An Online Journal of Applied Jewish Studies, and My Jewish Learning. Weiss is an alumna of both the Bronfman Fellowship (2001) and the Wexner Graduate Fellowship program (class 25). She has served on the national boards of both T'ruah: The Rabbinic Call for Human Rights and the National Havurah Committee.

In 2012, Weiss, who wrote her doctoral dissertation about Yiddish musical cinema of the early 20th century, earned her PhD in comparative literature and cultural studies at the University of Minnesota, where she had previously earned her MA with a minor concentration in Music Studies. During her years in Minnesota, Weiss founded and helped lead an independent Jewish community, the Uptown Havurah.

A Fulbright ethnomusicology research fellow in Berlin (2006–2007), Weiss has presented at multiple conferences and written on the origins of klezmer music and its shifting cultural reception; some of Weiss' studies on this theme can be found in her chapter "Klezmer in the New Germany: History, Identity, and Memory" in Three-Way Street: Jews, Germans, and the Transnational.

A visual artist and musician, Weiss, as an undergraduate student at Northwestern University (where she majored in Comparative Literary Studies, philosophy, and Radio/Television/Film) founded and led Northwestern's klezmer band WildKatz! for whom she produced the album Party Like it's 1899 (2004), hosted and produced Continental Drift, the daily world music show on WNUR 89.3 fm (2005–2006), served as an award-winning political cartoonist for The Daily Northwestern, and she has written on the history and cultural narratives of the illuminated haggadah.

A filmmaker (director, actor and writer), Weiss directed the award-winning live-action film The King's Daughter and, while a student at the Jewish Theological Seminary (from which she was ordained in 2016), Weiss co-wrote and acted in a satirical video "If Men Rabbis Were Spoken To The Way Women Rabbis Are Spoken To," which, in The Jewish Week, opened up a conversation about gender equity in the rabbinate. During her time in Nova Scotia, Weiss was one of only two women serving as full-time senior rabbis of Conservative synagogues in Canada and was a regular contributor to the "Rabbi to Rabbi" column in The Canadian Jewish News. In 2015, Weiss was named by The Forward as one of the paper's "36 Under 36."

Weiss is a descendant of Rabbi David Altschuler, the 17th–18th century author of the biblical commentaries, the Metzudat David and the Metzudat Tzion.
