= Kerry Olitzky =

American rabbi and nonprofit executive

Rabbi Kerry M. Olitzky is an Associate at Mersky, Jaffe & Associates, a firm that specializes in financial resource development and executive search solutions for the nonprofit community. He has previously been the Executive Director of Big Tent Judaism (formerly known as the Jewish Outreach Institute), a United States independent organization dedicated to bringing Judaism to interfaith families and the unaffiliated.

== Education ==
He was born in Pittsburgh, Pennsylvania (1954). He earned his undergraduate Bachelors of Arts (1974) and M.A. (1975) from the University of South Florida. He received his M.H.L. from Hebrew Union College in 1980, where he was ordained in 1981 and earned a D.H.L. in 1985.

== Career ==
Formerly, he served as vice president of the Wexner Heritage Foundation, an adult Jewish education and leadership program in North America. Previously, he was national Dean of Adult Jewish Learning and Living of the Hebrew Union College-Jewish Institute of Religion where he served on the faculty and administration for 15 years following his tenure at Congregation Beth Israel in West Hartford, Connecticut.

Rabbi Olitzky is a leader in the development of Jewish education, particularly for adults. He has shaped training programs for clergy of all faiths, especially in the area of pastoral care and counseling in the Jewish community. He has done pioneering work in the area of Jewish Twelve Step spirituality, as well as Jewish Gerontology.

== Commentaries ==
Together with professor Leonard S. Kravitz, Olitzky has authored a series of Tanakh commentaries. Their commentaries draw on classical Jewish works such as the Mishnah, Talmud, Targums, the midrash literature, classical Jewish bible commentators such as Gersonides, Rashi and Abraham ibn Ezra, modern-day rabbis, and higher textual criticism, but are not academic books using source criticism to deconstruct the Tanakh. The authors claim that they do not follow either the path of classical Reform scholars or more secular projects such as the Anchor Bible series. These books are distributed by Behrman House. Commentaries in this series now include Ecclesiastes, Esther, Jonah, Lamentations, Proverbs, Ruth, and the Song of Songs. The Olitzky-Kravitz writing team has also done commentaries on Pirkei Avot as well as Maimonides' renowned introduction to his commentary of Pirkei Avot, known as Shemonah Perakim, along with a collection of source material on Teshuva called "Journey of the Soul."

== Works ==
Olitzky is a former contributing editor for Shma: A Journal of Jewish Responsibility and is also the author of over 75 books and hundreds of articles in a variety of fields. Among his publications are:

- The Littlest Candle: A Hanukkah Story, with Jesse Olitzky (Kalaniot Books)
- The Candy Man Mystery (Kalaniot Books)
- An Invitation to Passover, written with Rabbi Debra Biden Cohen. (Kalaniot Books)
- Where is the Potty on this Ark? (Kar Ben Publishing)
- Welcome to the Seder, A Passover Haggadah (Behrman House)
- The Book of Job: A Modern Translation and Commentary with Leonard S. Kravitz (Wipf and Stock)
- The Rituals and Practices of a Jewish Life: A Handbook for Personal Spiritual Renewal, with Dan Judson (Jewish Lights);

Shorter articles include:

- Public Space Judaism Contact: The Journal of the Jewish Life Network/Steinhardt Foundation. Steinhardt Foundation for Jewish Life. Fall 2009: 10–11.
- Keep Our Shuls Safe But Still Friendly, with Edward M. Feinstein, Jewish Journal, September 17, 2008
- Synagogue: A New Concept for a New Age, Journal of Jewish Communal Service, Vol. 62/No. 1, 1985.
- and more.
