= Rami M. Shapiro =

American rabbi

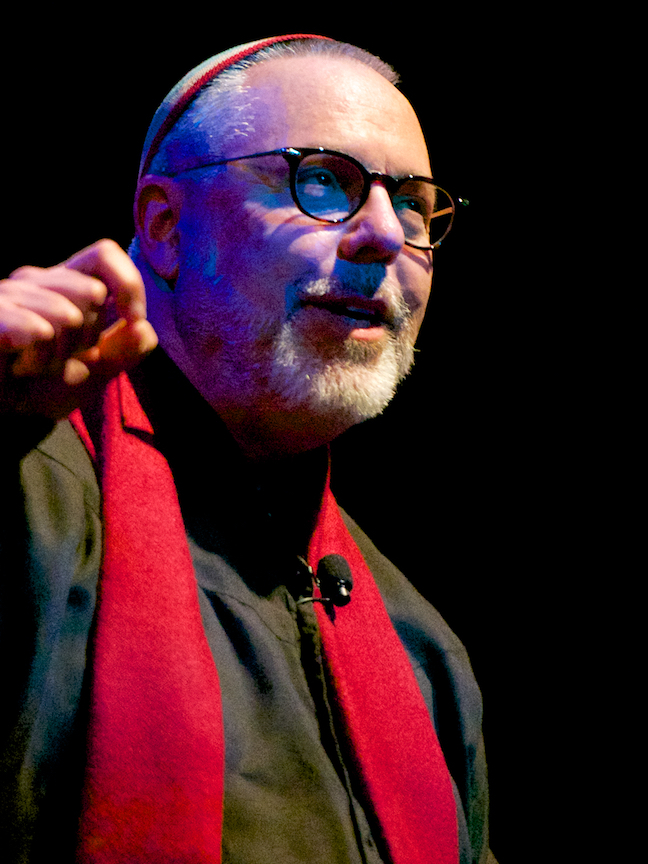
- Shapiro in 2017
- Born: April 26, 1951 (age 75); Springfield, Massachusetts, U.S.
- Education: University of Massachusetts Amherst; University of Tel Aviv; Smith College; McMaster University

Rami M. Shapiro (26 April 1951), commonly called "Rabbi Rami", is an American Reform rabbi, author, teacher, and speaker on the subjects liberal Judaism and contemporary spirituality. His Judaism is grounded in the perennial philosophy.

== Early life and education ==
Shapiro was born in Springfield, Massachusetts, and raised in a modern Orthodox Jewish household. Introduced to the study of world religions in high school, he began a serious study and practice of Zen Buddhism at the age of sixteen.

Shapiro enrolled at the University of Massachusetts Amherst in 1969, majoring in philosophy. During his studies, he was guided by Teresina Havens, a retired professor of world religion from Smith College, who mentored him as a private student in analyzing the Bhagavad Gita and Goddess-based spirituality. This mentorship led to a private conference that examined the archetypal Divine Feminine in Hinduism and Judaism.

As part of a study abroad program, Shapiro attended the University of Tel Aviv, where he focused on Jewish philosophy—especially the work of Martin Buber. While in Israel, he studied Chabad Hasidism and lived for a short time at Kfar Chabad, a Chabad-Lubavitch community. He then enrolled full-time at Smith College (one of only eight men allowed to do so at the time), where he majored in Buddhist studies with Taitetsu Unno. Shapiro managed Smith's zendō and sat sesshin with Joshu Sasaki Roshi of Mount Baldy Zen Center. His philosophy degree was conferred by the University of Massachusetts in 1973.

After graduating, Shapiro married Deborah Flanigan and moved to Hamilton, Ontario. He earned his M.A. in religious studies at McMaster University, focusing on contemporary Jewish philosophy, particularly the work of Mordecai Kaplan.

Shapiro enrolled at the Hebrew Union College – Jewish Institute of Religion in 1976, spending his first year of study in Jerusalem. During this time, he studied privately with Kaplan, who was then 99 years old, and with Sherwin Wine and the Society for Humanistic Judaism. After completing his year in Jerusalem, Shapiro continued his studies under the guidance of Ellis Rivkin, Eugene Mihaly, and Alvin J. Reines. He aimed to blend his Judaism with his passion for Zen Buddhism, Taoism, and Advaita Vedanta (non-dual Hinduism). In 1979, he was appointed a chaplain in the United States Air Force, serving as a full-time rabbi at Wright-Patterson Air Force Base. Shapiro completed his rabbinic studies in 1981.

== Career and work ==
Upon graduation, Shapiro moved to Miami and created Temple Beth Or, a synagogue and think tank where he experimented with new forms of Jewish liturgy and practice, combining his experiences with Judaism, Buddhism, and Hinduism. He continued his Zen practice with the aid of Gesshin Roshi's International Zen Institute of Miami. In 1985 Shapiro completed a Ph.D. in Contemporary Jewish Studies from Union Graduate School using his work with the temple as the basis for his dissertation. During his 20 years at Temple Beth Or, Shapiro studied with Rabbi Zalman Shachter-Shalomi, the founder of Jewish Renewal, a neo-Hasidic movement. In 2000 Shachter-Shalomi gave him the title of Rebbe (spiritual master).

In 1984 Shapiro was invited to become a founding member of the Snowmass Group, an annual gathering of contemplatives from various religions held at St. Benedict's Monastery in Snowmass, Colorado, under the auspices of Father Thomas Keating. Through Keating, Shapiro met Ed Bastian, the founder of the Spiritual Paths Institute, and became part of the institute's faculty. Also on the institute's faculty was Swami Atmarupananda, who became Shapiro's primary Hindu teacher. After a decade of study, Shapiro was initiated into the Ramakrishna Order of Vedanta Hinduism under Atmarupananda's teacher, Swami Swahananda. Shapiro lectures on the parallels between Judaism and Hinduism at various Vedanta centers in India and the United States.

In 2002 Shapiro was invited to deliver the Huston Smith Lecture at the California Institute of Integral Studies. He called this lecture, delivered with Smith sitting in the front row, "one of the highlights of my career."

In 2012 Shapiro teamed up with Reverend Tim Miner and the Order of Universal Interfaith to co-found the annual Big I Conference on Inclusive Theology, Spirituality, and Consciousness.

In 2016, after leaving the university, Shapiro teamed up with Reverend Claire Goodman and Frank Levy to create the One River Foundation. One River promotes the study of Perennial Wisdom, the mystic heart found at the core of all religions. The foundation sponsors five projects: The One River Wisdom School, a retreat-based program for the study of sacred texts Eastern and Western; The Order of the Holy Rascal, honoring people who strive to free their respective religions from politics, power, and parochialism; Cup of Wisdom, a book club to study The World Wisdom Bible, an anthology of Perennial Wisdom texts and teachings of many world religions; The Grand Lodge of All Beings, to train people to live as a blessing to all the families of the Earth (Genesis 12:3); and Conversations on the Edge, a podcast that explores cutting-edge ideas in spirituality and cultural transformation.

In addition to writing books and teaching, Shapiro is a Contributing Editor at Spirituality and Health magazine, for which he writes "Roadside Assistance for the Spiritual Traveler", a spiritual Q&A column, and "Roadside Musings", a blog on the magazine's website. He also hosts the magazine's podcast, "Essential Conversations with Rabbi Rami".

In 2020, Shapiro received the Huston Smith Award for Interfaith Education and Service from the Board of Directors of the Order of Universal Interfaith.

He served for ten years as Adjunct Professor of Religion at Middle Tennessee State University.

== Honors ==
- "Huston Smith Award for Interfaith Education and Service" (2020)
- Spirituality & Practice Award for Best Spiritual Nonfiction (2001, 2002, 2005, 2007, 2009, 2010)
- Best Buddhist Writing (essay) (2009)
- Tennessee Intellectual Freedom Award (2006)
- Reb Zalman Shachter-Shalomi Legacy Award (2002)
- Best Jewish Writing (essay) (2001, 2002)
- Templeton Foundation Prize in Expanding Humanity's Vision of God (2000)
- Best Nonfiction Essay, Florida Newspaper Association (1993, 1994)
- Moment Magazine Community Service Award (1989)
- Bettan Memorial Prize for Creativity in the Liturgical Arts (1981)

== Works ==
- Open Hands, a Jewish guide to dying, death & bereavement, Medic Publishing (1990)
- Open Hearts, helping friends through mourning, Medic Publishing (1991)
- The Wisdom of the Jewish Sages, Bell Tower/Random House (1995)
- Minyan, Bell Tower/Random House (1997)
- The Way of Solomon, HarperSanFrancisco (2000)
- The Wisdom of Solomon, Bell Tower/Random House (2001)
- Hasidic Tales, Annotated and Explained, Skylight Paths (2003)
- The Prophets, Annotated and Explained, Skylight Paths (2004)
- Open Secrets, Monkfish (2004)
- Breaking Bread Together, Paraclete Press (2005)
- The Divine Feminine, Annotated and Explained, Skylight Paths (2005)
- Ethics of the Jewish Sages, Annotated and Explained, Skylight Paths (2006)
- The Sacred Art of Lovingkindness, Skylight Paths (2006)
- Recovery, 12 Steps as Spiritual Practice, Skylight Paths (2009)
- The Angelic Way, Bluebridge (2009)
- Ecclesiastes, Annotated and Explained, Skylight Paths (2010)
- Tanya, Annotated and Explained, Skylight Paths (2010)
- Love of Eternal Wisdom, Wisdom House Books (2011)
- Proverbs, Annotated and Explained, Skylight Paths (2011)
- Rabbi Rami Guide to God, Spirituality & Health (2011)
- Rabbi Rami Guide to Forgiveness, Spirituality & Health (2011)
- Rabbi Rami Guide to Parenting, Spirituality & Health (2011)
- Rabbi Rami Guide to Psalm 23, Spirituality & Health (2011)
- The Sacred Art of Writing, Skylight Paths (2012)
- Mount & Mountain, Volume 1, Smyth & Helwys (2012), with Rev. Dr. Mike Smith
- Amazing Chesed, Jewish Lights Publishing (2012)
- Mount & Mountain, Volume 2, Smyth & Helwys (2013)
- Perennial Wisdom for the Spiritually Independent (2013)
- Mount & Mountain, Volume 3, Smyth & Helwys (2014)
- Let us Break Bread Together, with Rev. Dr. Mike Smith, Paraclete Press.
- The Golden Rule & the World's Religions, Skylight Paths (2015)
- Accidental Grace:Poetry, Prayers and Psalms. 2015
- The World Wisdom Bible, Tuner Publishing (2017)
- Holy Rascals, Sounds True Publishing (2017)
- The Tao of Solomon: Unlocking the Perennial Wisdom of Ecclesiastes, Ben Yehudah Press (2018)
- Surrendered: Shattering the Illusion of Control and Falling Grace with Twelve-Step Spirituality, Skylight Paths (2019)
- The Gospel of Sophia, One River Books (forthcoming)

In addition to these books, Shapiro has contributed chapters to over three dozen anthologies.
