= Christian Vegetarian Association =

International Christian vegetarian organization

The Christian Vegetarian Association (CVA) is an international, interdenominational Christian vegetarian organization that promotes responsible stewardship of God's creation through plant-based eating. The CVA claims to advocate vegetarianism from a biblically-based, Christian perspective and sees dietary choice as a valid way to bear witness to Christ's ministry of love, peace, mercy and compassion, and prepare for the Peaceable Kingdom as foretold in the Bible.

== Overview ==
The Christian Vegetarian Association (CVA) encourages Christians to reduce or eliminate animal products as part of their Christian calling to be good stewards of God's Creation. According to their website, the CVA is "an international, non-denominational ministry of believers dedicated to respectfully promoting healthy, Christ-centered and God-honoring living among Christians."

The CVA promotes the ethical, environmental and health benefits of plant-based diets. They assert that there is a connection between animal-based diets and world hunger, ecological damage, animal mistreatment and human disease.

== History ==
The CVA was founded in 1999 by Nathan Braun. Braun organized a board of professors, theologians, and activists. The organization quickly grew.

In 2000, the CVA produced its first edition of What Would Jesus Eat...Today? which has an annual distribution rate of approximately 250,000 and been translated into several languages.

In 2002, CVA founder Nathan Braun and co-chairman Stephen R. Kaufman, M.D. published the first edition of Good News for All Creation: Vegetarianism as Christian Stewardship (2002: Vegetarian Advocates Press) and a revised, second version two years later (2004: Vegetarian Advocates Press).

In 2006, the CVA produced a short documentary film with an accompanying study guide called Honoring God's Creation.

== See also ==
- Animal rights
- Christian pacifism
- Christian vegetarianism
- List of vegetarian and vegan organizations
- Bruce Friedrich
- PETA
- Andrew Linzey
- Tom Regan
- Peter Singer
