= Feminist Jewish ethics =

Feminist Jewish ethics is an area of study in Jewish ethics and feminist philosophy.

== Literature and key thinkers ==
=== Judith Plaskow ===
In her 1991 work, Standing Again at Sinai: Judaism from a Feminist Perspective, Judith Plaskow discusses the experiences of Jewish women, within a modern framework. Her work focuses on the transformation Jewish tradition, to include and be influenced by a feminist lens. This theme of change is heavily carried throughout her writing on Feminist Jewish Ethics. She considers the ways in which feminist thought can utilize theology to include women within Jewish thinking and experience. Plaskow takes on a Feminist perspective in her analysis of Jewish tradition in order to provide a reinterpretation of theology and Jewish thought that best includes and validates the experiences of modern Jewish women. She confronts Jewish theology and its tendencies toward male-centric language, and the singularity of its image of a superior God. She argues that such tendencies influence and motivate underlying patriarchal forces within traditional Judaism, and thus invalidate female experiences. By arguing for a multiplicity of images of God and the reassessment of God's role as non-hierarchical, Plaskow aims to provide a resolution within her Jewish feminist theology.

=== Rachel Adler ===
In her 1971 article entitled "The Jew Who Wasn't There: Halacha and the Jewish Woman", Rachel Adler provides an initial platform for her own analysis of feminist ethics within the Jewish tradition. Throughout various works, she focuses on Jewish traditional considerations of impurities within women. She presents a defense of Jewish ritual for female purification, in her 1972 work "Tum'ah and Toharah: Ends and Beginnings". However, in her 1993 essay, "In Your Blood, Live: Re-visions of a Theology of Purity", she rather arrives at an opposing conclusion, that traditional discussions of purity and impurity do not allow for an equalized system, between males and females and that such tradition suggests that "most impure people are women". In her 1983 essay entitled, "I've Had Nothing Yet, So I Can't Take More", she criticizes rabbinic tradition for marginalizing women within "its processes".

=== Blu Greenberg ===
In her 1981 work, On Women and Judaism: A View from Tradition, Blu Greenberg studies the many ways in which modern women are excluded from Judaism. By doing so, she develops a new space and way of practice for the female role, within traditional Judaism. She aims to uncover whether feminism is of benefit or detriment to Jewish tradition. Her works aim to mend the points of contention that she studies between Judaism and feminism. However, she is mutually committed to truly understanding whether feminism is beneficial for Jewish tradition.

=== Tamar Ross ===
Tamar Ross is a Modern Orthodox Jewish feminist thinker who confronts perceived flaws within traditional Jewish thought and law. She considers biases within what she considers patriarchal traditional text. In response to a traditional concept that she considers particularly problematic: the idea of "Torah from Heaven", she introduces the idea of evolving revelation. She develops this approach, and the metaphor of "Expanding the Palace of Torah", which she adopts from Abraham Isaac Kook's philosophy, as she intends to promote expansion, rather than dismissal of religious tradition, and text. In her 2004 work, Expanding the Palace of Torah: Orthodoxy and Feminism, she details a path by which Orthodoxy can become more inclusive of Feminist Ethics and practice.

=== Tova Hartman ===
In her book, Feminism Encounters Traditional Judaism: Resistance and Accommodation, Tova Hartman offers experiential insight on the intersections of modern feminism and Jewish Tradition. Hartman provides three stances that she claims "may be relevant, resonant, and helpful in cultivating a strong feminist position vis-á-vis the traditional Jewish canon,": affirmation, rejection and reinterpretation. Her juxtaposition of feminist readings of Freud and alternative feminist readings of Orthodox Judaism allows Hartman to emphasize the utility and necessity of reinterpretation and revision in her own attempt at re-engagement.

== History ==
Jewish ethics is the intersection of Judaism and the philosophical discipline of ethics. Most Jewish ethical texts derive from the Hebrew Bible. For centuries, the biblical literature has served as a "primary source for the development of Jewish moral concepts and ethical reflection". Tracing back to ancient rabbinic Judaism, scholars have sought to develop ethics and a moral code of conduct based on their understanding of the written Torah. Pirkei Avot, a compilation of ethical teachings in the Talmud, was written by the rabbis of the Mishnaic period. It outlines the Torah's views on ethics and interpersonal relationships and it is the only part of the Talmud not containing laws. Jewish ethics continued to expand in the Middle Ages as great Jewish thinkers including Moses Maimonides, Saadya Gaon, and Bahya ben Joseph ibn Paquda greatly contributed to moral Jewish thought. During the 19th and 20th centuries, Jewish ethics flourished, in part due to the development of the different denominations or branches of Judaism. There are many different scholars who have influenced contemporary Jewish ethics including Hermann Cohen, Martin Buber, and Emmanuel Levinas. Still, in recent decades, the interpretation and reinterpretation of Jewish ethics continues to be a source of debate among scholars.

In the 1970s, Feminist Jewish scholars entered this debate. The Jewish feminist movement emerged as part of the Second Wave of Feminism in an attempt to As a result of the feminist Jewish movement, many changes were made in the status and treatment of Jewish women, most notably regarding worship, liturgy, and the practices of niddah and the mikveh.

Along with changes to the treatment of women, there were new developments in feminist Jewish scholarship and thought. Prior to the 1970s and 1980s, women's voices were excluded from the predominantly male-oriented practices and texts of Judaism. Feminist Jewish-thought scholars have attempted to create a theological narrative that merges feminism with Judaism. According to Judith Plaskow, one of the first Jewish feminist theologians, early Jewish feminists were mainly concerned with the exclusion of women from the minyan, positive time-bound mitzvot, and the inability for women to serve as witnesses and to initiate divorce. Today, the dilemmas posed for Jewish feminist theologians extend beyond the original issues by tackling problems of women in liturgy, biblical language, and sexuality. "Though all feminists believe that Judaism reflects a male bias, the extent to which each Jewish feminist believes Judaism and feminism are reconcilable" has shaped the multitude of ways feminist scholars have approached feminist Jewish thought.

One approach for many feminist Jewish theologians has been the belief that Judaism is patriarchial at its core and that a few alterations to Jewish practices do not compensate for gender inequality. They believe Judaism is a system that reflects a dominantly male-voice and one in which woman is viewed as "other". It is their view that the current form of Judaism must be rejected. Feminist Jewish theologians have responded to this problem in a number of ways. In the 1970s, Judith Plaskow suggested the need for a complete reimagining of Judaism. In many of her works, Plaskow addresses the problem of Judaism's androcentric theology and argues that feminism "demands a new understanding of Torah, God, and Israel". Not only must the male-dominated language of Judaism (such as the image of God as male and superior) be changed, but also a multiplicity of God images is an essential aspect of Jewish feminist theology. Furthermore, she promotes a Judaism in which the feminist mode of thought can help redefine the Jewish experience for women. From Plaskow's point of view, Judaism must undergo a complete reimagining that not only focuses on contemporary Jewish problems, but one that delves into the theology behind Judaism.

Another approach by feminist Jewish theologians has sought to integrate female concerns and female voices into an existing model of Judaism. Blu Greenberg, an Orthodox Jew, is one such feminist who follows this model. In her most well-known work, On Women and Judaism written in 1994, Greenberg presents a model for reconciling Judaism and feminism in a way that works within the boundaries of halakha and allows for "growth and greater equality in ritual and spiritual realms". To accomplish this goal, Greenberg proposes many alterations to Jewish practices so that they more readily reflect women's equality. Scholars who support this model are more likely to use traditional resources as a means to foster a feminist Judaism because Judaism appears to be less androcentric. Theologians such as Greenberg ultimately advocate for a movement where Halakhah embodies and expresses women's concerns and infuses women's concerns with Jewish values.

Rachel Adler, a Reform feminist Jewish theologian, has another approach to women's place in Jewish ethics. Adler, in her work Engendering Judaism written in 1998, advocates for the use of gender to help understand the Jewish past and shape the Jewish future. Adler acknowledges that although traditional Jewish law has systematically ignored women's voices, she also recognizes the centrality of Halacha. She thus envisions a Judaism, which would draw not only upon the totality of Jewish tradition and law, but also one in which gender and gender equality are central to the conversation, ultimately creating a more inclusive, engendered Judaism.

One other popular methodology used by feminist Jewish theologians is the belief that while there are gender inequalities within Judaism, they can be changed without altering the fundamentally traditional structures. Tamar Ross, in Expanding the Palace of Torah written in 2004, outlines a path for a more inclusive Orthodoxy of feminist values. She argues for a change within halakha, detailing halakhic legal tools that can allow for changes in Orthodoxy as well as providing theologies of revelation and God, which allow for the acceptance of these changes. In a similar fashion, Tova Hartman, in her work Feminism Encounters Traditional Judaism written in 2007, acknowledges the importance of biblical literature, but argues for the rereading and reinterpretation of such texts to create a more inclusive Judaism for women.

=== Changes in the status of women within Judaism ===
The multitude of scholars who have addressed the tension between feminism and Judaism with respect to theology has led to significant changes within the different denominations of Judaism. For instance, women found the language of the traditional Judaic prayer book to be restrictive and lacking a feminine voice. The exclusion of matriarchs and sole use of male imagery to describe God suggested that public worship was primarily for men. In the early 1990s, prayer books began to include the names of the matriarchs as well as gender-sensitive God-language. Throughout the 1970s and 1980s, many changes for women were made in synagogue life such as the inclusion of women in liturgical positions and the ability to form a minyan. In 1972, the Reform Movement in the United States ordained the first female rabbi. For many Jewish women, the Reform Movement provided an ideal setting for women's voices to be heard and their experiences to be central to Judaism rather than marginalized.

The Reconstructionist Movement soon followed in similar footsteps to those of Reform Judaism. Mordecai Kaplan, founder of Reconstructionist Judaism, was a strong advocate for the equality of women in Judaism. He argued in his essays, The Reconstructionist Papers, that Jewish law defines women as inferior to men and concludes that Jewish law must change and rid itself of these gender inequalities. In 1922, the first Bat Mitzvah occurred in a Reconstructionist synagogue, but it was not until 1974 that the Reconstructionist Movement ordained its first female rabbi. Reconstructionism has allowed women to voice their concerns from social issues like domestic violence to religious inequalities such as the right for women to read from the Torah. The Reconstructionist Movement has moved beyond Kaplan's original vision of equality toward a reconceptualization of Judaism through a feminist lens."

Conservative Judaism, in recent years, has seen its position on women shift towards equality as well. The Committee on Jewish Law and Standards is the central authority on halakha within Conservative Judaism. By 1955, the Committee on Jewish Law and Standards permitted women to chant blessings before and after the Torah readings and in 1973, women counted as members of a minyan. Ten years later, in October 1983, the Jewish Theological Seminary, the main educational institution of the Conservative Movement, began accepting women in the rabbinical and cantorial schools. It ordained the first woman rabbi in the Conservative Movement in 1985. The Committee on Jewish Law Standards adopted three responsa in 2006 regarding the subject of middah. It reaffirmed the obligation of Conservative Jewish women to abstain from sexual relations during menstruation and the immersion in the mikveh, but has also loosened the restrictions regarding niddah.

The Orthodox Movement has also seen progression for women. While it has yet to accept women into its rabbinate, in the past few decades, women have gained new rights and opportunities. Orthodox Jewish women now have the ability to work as rabbinical advocates, family purity experts, and synagogue leaders. In the late 1970s, women began to study Talmud and other Jewish texts. In the 1990s, women took on the role of to'anot rabaniyot or rabbinical advocates, a job previously only available to men. The to'anot help divorcing couples navigate the tricky legal system. In 1997, women were permitted to train as yoatzot halakha, female Halakhic advisors who were knowledgeable in the laws and rituals regarding niddah and ritual purity. The details of these laws, which relate to menstruation as well as other issues of sexuality and women's health, render some women understandably uncomfortable in the presence of a male rabbi. Since the late 1990s, many Modern Orthodox synagogues in the United States have created congregational leadership positions for women such as community scholars or assistant congregational leaders. These positions resemble the duties of the rabbi, however, these women are careful not to call themselves rabbis. Orthodox interpretations of Jewish law continue to prevent women from counting as part of minyan and from bearing witness.

== Approaches to traditional Jewish texts ==
Feminist Jewish scholars approach Jewish texts with several ethical considerations. They struggle with the ethically problematic portrayal of women in Torah and rabbinic texts and offer their own readings of these texts. They often use Jewish Feminist values to reflect upon ethical practices in Judaism and in the modern world.

=== Ethical readings of Torah ===
Feminist Jewish scholars point out the mistreatment of women in the Torah. They argue that it is an ethical imperative to engage in the interpretation of the Torah using a feminist lens. A Jewish Feminist critique of the Torah is attentive to phenomena in the text such as the absence, silence, distortion, or subjugation of women in the text. Because the text exhibits a "normative character of maleness," a feminist critique is one in which "the stage of criticism is never left behind..."

A common feminist critique of the Torah is noting the degree to which women are absent or silenced. Judith Plaskow writes, "Half of Jews have been women, but men have been defined as normative Jews, while women's voices and experiences are largely invisible in the record of Jewish belief and experience that has come down to us."

Rachel Adler invokes the rabbinic concept of Geneivat da'at ("theft of the mind") to describe the process by which tradition "steals the memory of the true face of the other" by misremembering and misrepresenting women in the text.

Feminists also point out that the targeted audience of the Torah is male. Rachel Adler cites Exodus 19:15, "And he [Moses] said to the people, 'Be ready for the third day: do not go near a woman.'" as an example of the male audience of the text. Moreover, Adler argues, when this text is read each year during the holiday of Shavuot, women "are left standing apart as your mothers stood under the mountain, eavesdropping on the conversation between God and man, wondering if there is anything God wants you to do and, if so – why doesn't He tell you so Himself?"

Having identified the patriarchy of the text and the way it has translated into the unethical treatment of women, the project of many feminist writers is to reclaim the voices of women in the text. Plaskow writes:

[H]ints concerning women's experiences must be carefully ferreted out from narratives, prophecies, and legal texts focused on other matters. Biblical scholars, for example, have argued that the scant sources concerning Miriam suggest that she was probably an important cultic leader in early Israel. What exactly was the nature of her contribution and role?

Jewish feminist scholars frequently reflect that the Torah portrays women subordinately. Tamar Ross writes, "[T]here is no denying that women's subordinate status did receive concrete expression even in biblical times." Similarly, Plaskow comments:

In Torah, Jewish Teaching, women are not absent, but they are cast in stories told by men. As characters in narrative, women may be vividly characterized, as objects of legislation, singled out for attention. But women's presence in Torah does not negate their silence, for women do not decide the questions with which Jewish sources deal.

These critiques are challenging from a Jewish perspective because of the centrality of the Torah in the Jewish tradition. Many feminists describe the tension of criticizing that which they hold precious. Tova Hartman, who identifies as Modern Orthodox, describes this tension:

To know that one is feminist and to know that one loves the Bible is, in the thinking of many, at best an oxymoron, perhaps clever as a rhetorical statement but surely not a possibility for existential living. After all, no woman can serve two authorities, a master called Scripture and a mistress called Feminism.

Jewish feminists differ in their treatment of source criticism as a tool for feminist biblical criticism. Some Jewish feminists maintain that source-critical methods help the reader to identify the historical context and explain the androcentric nature of the text. Orthodox feminist writers take issue with this lens because it rejects the traditional understanding of the origins of the Torah.

=== Ethical issues of Rabbinic texts ===
Rabbinic texts serve as foundational materials for much of Jewish life and practice including both legal and narrative areas of Jewish life. Feminists identify similar issues of patriarchy within rabbinic literature as they do in their critiques of the Torah. Just as with Torah, they assert that rabbinic texts silence, subjugate, misremember, and oppress women.

Laurie Zoloth writes that when women read rabbinic text, "We witness the discussion of our existence as the considered object, largely unnamed, and called only by the name of their relationship to men ('Rabbi Hiyya's wife,' 'the widow,' 'his handmaiden') and often seen only in terms of the most external of features." Rachel Adler utilizes object-relations theory, that understands this phenomenon and "explain that it is because women are not perceived as autonomous subjects in these narratives." Zoloth describes that the result of this process is that:

The woman as reader must project herself right out of her body, the body of the discourse, imagine herself into the male-self of her teacher, who is imagining rabbis imagining the fictive body of women. It is elaborate textual cross-dressing.

Many Jewish feminist scholars also criticize the imagery rabbinic texts use to describe women and the consequences of those images. Plaskow notes that rabbinic texts frequently portray women as temptresses and connects this imagery to halakhic legislation aimed at controlling women's sexuality. Susan Shapiro identifies the use of the "married harlot" image in Maimonides and points to his writings permitting the beating of one's wife. She writes:

I am not suggesting that Maimonides required the metaphor of the 'married harlot' to hold this position on wife beating. ... The metaphor didn't make him do it. Rather, ... [the metaphor] further reinforces, rationalizes, and justifies such violence against wives and women. Metaphors matter. They have consequences.

The rabbinic literary genre of midrash is often suggested by feminist thinkers are being particularly well suited to feminist endeavors. Suzanne Stone writes:

The great attraction of midrash for feminist legal scholars, however, is that it may be read as a metaphoric discussion of legal and moral concepts, one that transcends the traditional dichotomies of law and literature or reason and emotion.

Similarly, Plaskow writes:

Yet historiography is not the only nor the best source for the feminist expansion of Torah. Jews have traditionally used midrash to broaden or alter the meanings of texts. The midrashic process of bringing contemporary questions to traditional sources and elaborating on the sources in response to questions easily lends itself to feminist use.

Some scholars reject the midrashic approach. Heidi Ravven argues that the claim that texts have "multiple levels of meaning" is a "pre-modern fiction" that, "With the advent of scientific historical scholarship of texts we can no longer claim [to be true]." Ravven suggests that instead of rereading old texts with new ethical understandings, feminists need to confront the Jewish philosophical tradition "head on" and create change through this "philosophic response".

=== Ethical readings of Torah and Rabbinic text ===
Many tools characterize a feminist reading of the Torah and rabbinic text. Some feminist readings focus on giving voice to otherwise silent women in texts. Plaskow reflects on the characters of Miriam and Dinah, and references the worship of goddesses as areas of silence and misremembering which are deserving of a voice.

Zoloth describes a gendered reading as one that recognizes that the text naturally "pulls" in the direction of a male reader. She suggests a type of reading that she calls "reading like a girl." Zoloth explains:

Reading like a girl then deconstructs the narrative logic of the passage because the reader resists the forward going movement of the narrative with a motion of her own, turning away from the conversation to another possible conversation, not yet quite spoken, but whose possibilities suggest ... an alternative plane of moral discourse. It will be the counter-text, the background and not the foreground, an alternative patterning, that will arise with a gendered reading.

While these feminist thinkers, and others like them, suggest readings that in some manner reinterpret or redeem the text, others suggest reading the texts as they are to point out the ethical quandaries present within them. Plaskow refers to this as "preaching against the text" and remarks that, "Remaining silent about the negative aspects of tradition not only leaves them to do their work in the world, it also deprives us of an important spiritual resources." [Judith Plaskow, "Preaching against the text" in The Coming of Lilith: Essays on Feminism, Judaism, and Sexual Ethics. Boston: Beacon Press, 2005. P.155] Plaskow identifies these spiritual resources as responses to the pain that exists in Jewish communities and that can be alleviated if people use these texts as opportunities to discuss the issues that could be the source of this pain.

=== Health care ===
Laurie Zoloth poses the question, "How are religious scholars shaping the moral sense of ethical choices in American life?" She argues that the voice of Jewish tradition can bring back a voice of community in the face of a culture that values autonomy. Zoloth uses biblical and rabbinic texts to foster an ethic of health care in the United States. She discusses a story in the Talmud to reflect on the issue of the micro-allocation of medical resources. The story relates:

Two people were walking along the way, and in the hand of one of them was a flask of water. If both of them drink, they die, but if one of them drinks, he reaches civilization. Ben Petura expounded: it is better that both of them should drink and die and let not one of them see the death of his fellow. Until Rabbi Akiba came and taught: "That your brother may live with you" – your life takes precedence over the life of your fellow. (Bava Metzia 62a)

Zoloth analyzes this, and many other sources, to arrive at ethical language through which society can frame the debate on medical ethics. She writes, "The impoverishment of the community is a real factor, and it must be considered even when a life is at stake. The project of a community as a whole must be affected by the plight of the one, according to Rashi, but there are limits on obligation."

In framing a new discourse on health care, Zoloth offers a feminist ethical reading of the Book of Ruth. She points to passages and themes in Ruth that detail friendship, family, and community depicted as an obligation and a right. She also highlights the themes of loving the community, the value of face-to-face encounters, and the responsibility of the social order to provide for a "basic minimum". She concludes, "What Ruth teaches is that citizenship is solidarity, that meaningful discourse starts with the recognition of the other, and that justice is prior to any human freedom". This feminist ethical analysis derives its values from the action of a female biblical heroine.

=== Abortion ===
David Kraemer notes that when Jewish commentators speak about values or ethics, "virtually without exception, even when they have claimed to be speaking of values or ethics, their discourse shows that they have really meant Jewish law (Halacha)". Kraemer constructs an ethical discourse on the topic of abortion that engages traditional rabbinic texts but that does not reflect a standard halachic approach to abortion. Kraemer claims that the "halachic approach to abortion leads to a dead end." but that this approach can evaluate questions such as "how Jewish traditions view the life or potential life of a fetus, the relationship of the fetus to the mother (and father), and the prerogatives of a mother (and father) with respect to the fetus." Kraemer notes that, "From the ethicist's perspective, the Talmud's inconclusiveness in this matter is its most notable feature." Therefore, he concludes that this lack of clarity "Is the most important characteristic of these various rabbinic discussion. This indecision offers us proper advice; we should hear it as a caution."

=== Globalization ===
Donna Berman posits a form of feminist ethics, what she calls nashiut ethics, in which the goal is "not to redeem oppressive texts, but to redeem Jewish women – and men – from oppressive texts." Berman identifies the Jewish value of tikkun olam as an "essential ingredient" of faith because it serves to counteract the abuse or mistreatment of women. Berman suggests the topic of globalization as an area on which nashiut ethics can comment because "it represents well the complex web of race, gender and class issues which are ... the defining ingredients of early twenty-first century moral dilemmas." Berman then suggests that nashiut ethics would rebel against the forces of greed and exploitation and support the minority and oppressed workers in their struggle for recognition.

=== Jewish wedding ceremony ===
Rachel Adler points out that the Jewish rituals surrounding marriage stem from biblical and Talmudic conceptions of women as property and therefore reflect Talmudic rites of property transfer. Adler writes, "The legal definition, derived from talmudic property law, anachronistically categorizes women as a special kind of chattel over which the husband has acquired rights." Because of the patriarchal and unethical roots of this ceremony, Adler proposes a solution that will "treat both parties consistently as persons rather than as property." [Rachel Adler. 1998. Engendering Judaism: An Inclusive Theology and Ethics. Beacon Press: Boston, MA p. 169] Adler outlines a new wedding ceremony based on the sheva brachot (the celebratory blessings bestowed upon a newly married couple) that is compatible with an egalitarian society. Adler refers to this new ceremony as B'rit Ahuvim (a covenant of lovers).

== Denominational approaches ==
=== Conservative ===
One of the major sources of feminist Jewish ethics literature for Conservative Judaism comes from Judith Plaskow. Growing up in a classical Reform family during the 1950s, Plaskow became interested in theology as a teenager, and was the first Jewish feminist to identify herself as a theologian. She began to write about feminist ethics and the role of women in Judaism in the 1970s, her most famous work being The Coming of Lilith.

Plaskow was part of the Ezrat Nashim, a small Jewish feminist group that presented the "Call for Change" to the Rabbinical Assembly of the Conservative movement on March 14, 1972. While the Reform movement was already starting to address the role of women in Judaism, these Conservative women wanted to start a conversation with the heads of the Conservative movement. This call for change represents a liberal feminist stance, arguing for equal access to positions of leadership and religious participation from which Jewish women were excluded because of their gender. The heads of the Conservative movement at the Jewish Theological Seminary of America finally responded to Feminist outcry, and on October 24, 1983, began admitting women into the Rabbinical School.

In her essay The Right Question is Theological, Plaskow attempts to create a new imagining of Judaism for Conservative women. She argues that "the Jewish women's movement of the past decade has been and remains a civil-rights movement rather than a movement for "women's liberation"". Feminism in Judaism, especially Conservative Judaism, is too concerned with the status of women in religious life, as well as the halakhic language involved with change. She argues that a better focus for women in the Conservative movement would be the origins of the images and treatment of women in the text, and how reinterpretation of these ideas is required for the Conservative movement to evolve as a modern sect of Judaism. Feminists in the Conservative movement attempted to apply a feminist lens to Torah, Israel, and God. Through Torah, Jews can uncover women's histories and cultures throughout the biblical period. Analysis of Israel allows members of the Conservative community to look at Jewish women as present, equal, and responsible members of the Jewish community. With respect to God, Conservative Jews can analyze Halakhah while rejecting the overall patriarchal voice that dominates the religion. Yet there are more fundamental flaws in the theology that must be addressed as well. In particular, the image of God as superior. Arguing for a multiplicity of God images is an essential aspect of Jewish Feminist Theology, and that the role of God as non-hierarchical must be stressed in Conservative feminist Judaism.

Conservative feminists also believe that changes in Jewish communal structure with regard to worship contribute to a new understanding of God without the use of a male-dominated metaphor or language. Synagogues and communities that have advocated for women's leadership and allow women to play a larger role in the service gain access to a higher, spiritual diversity, in Chavurah prayer and study. Plaskow supports this, and defends this analysis as theology, claiming that "an established system can become self-perpetuating and lose its ability for introspection and re-examination of basic premises"

=== Reform ===
Fundamental sources of Feminist texts in Reform Judaism come from Rachel Adler. Originally married to an Orthodox rabbi, she eventually divorced in 1984 and remarried a committed Reform Jew. Her discontentment with the current status of women in Orthodox Judaism can be seen in her article I've Had Nothing Yet, So I Can't Take More. She believes that some of the fundamental issues in Judaism can never be resolved, and Reform Judaism needs to reevaluate the entire halakhic system in order to assess ideas about women that Reform Judaism currently does not discuss.

Feminist Reform Jews attempt to define what it means to engender Judaism. "There is not and never was a Judaism unaffected by the gendered perspectives of its transmitters and augmenters". Feminist Reform Jews attempt to explore a reading of the text that inflicts gender equality. the movement has been consciously remaking itself, and this is an attempt to modernize the scripture for contemporary Reform Jews, as Halakhah is too central to the Jewish experience to eliminate.

Adler, and many other Reform women, live with conflicted Jewish identities. Women refuse to disavow the sacred stories and texts that are the foundations of Judaism, yet are constantly fighting to make their voice heard in a for-men, by-men religion. These women and Reform feminist leaders attempt to reconcile a contemporary sense of female equality within Judaism.

In this approach, Halakhah is not considered a sufficient narrative, but it serves as a bridge between reality and the ideal. The goal is to look at Halakhah as stories. It is believed that there exists a master narrative that needs to be reinterpreted in Modern Reform Judaism to fit the way modern, western American Jews live today. By juxtaposing different stories, people using a feminist Reform approach believe they are able to use the dichotomy between Halakhah and aggadah to develop a modern theology that is inclusive of women's experiences in Reform Judaism.

=== Orthodox ===
Tamar Ross, one of the leading Orthodox Feminists, hopes to outline a path for Orthodoxy that calls for the inclusion of Feminist values and an egalitarian setting in the Orthodox movement. A student of Rav Kook, she argues for change from within Orthodoxy, as opposed to bringing outside information in (different from Modern Orthodoxy). "It is the Torah that must absorb the world rather than the world the Torah". She argues for a gradual process through which Orthodoxy can expand to include feminist thought.

Orthodox feminists believe that the Jewish tradition has room to accommodate space for both men and women in the patriarchal master narrative. Following Ross's guidance, Orthodox Jews attempt to "expanding the palace of Torah" to accommodate both genders, while also staying true to Orthodoxy and halakhah. Many Orthodox Feminist clash with other Jewish Feminists over Dialectical Theology, an understanding of the Torah which "understands everything said about God as a human effort to convey or recapture certain religious moments". This is problematic, as it suggests sections of the Torah were not written by God, a fundamental belief of Orthodoxy. Instead, many Orthodox feminists attempt to apply Process Theology to the text. This theology recognizes that God and the world are continually evolving, and everything in the world becomes a partner with God. This technology better fits Orthodoxy, as it does not attempt to challenge the fundamentals of Halakhah in Judaism.

In Feminism Encounters Traditional Judaism, Tova Hartman, a Modern Orthodox Feminist, explores some of the major points of interest to feminists as it applies to contemporary women in Modern Orthodoxy. She, along with many other Modern Orthodox women, struggle with their own definition of Judaism, and hopes to explore the numerous ways to change feminine participation and experience in Judaism without leaving the comfort of Modern Orthodoxy, the faction of Judaism these women are most familiar with, and hold their alliance to. Hartman's major topics of exploration include countering the patrilineal focus of biblical Judaism, the conflicting nature of male-regulated niddah rulings, and the benefits of experience women would provide to Judaism as a whole with a more united voice and active role. These topics are explored through three different responses: affirmation, rejection, and reinterpretation. Ultimately, Hartman supports the reinterpretation model, but all responses are available to Feminists critiquing the role of women in Modern Orthodoxy. Traditional representations of women are no longer acceptable, and Hartman attempts to lead women in the Modern Orthodox movement into a new era of Jewish Orthodoxy. Blu Greenberg, a second leading Modern Orthodox feminist, attempts to address the need for reform within the leaders of Modern Orthodoxy. She claims that what Modern Orthodoxy needs today is "the creation of a dialectical tension between Jewish values and the mores of modern society in light of the far reaching implications of women's liberation". Tapping into how feminism relates directly to Judaism, how Halakha can apply directly to both genders, niddah, and the role of Jewish women in the family.

One of Greenberg's leading points is that a larger role for women in Modern Orthodoxy shouldn't be equated to "adding a fifth fringe on the tzitzit or a fifth variety to the lulav". Women struggle to find their place in Modern Orthodoxy outside the stereotypical "mothering" role that has been the standard for years. Following Greenberg, Modern Orthodox feminists attempt to apply Halakha universally to male and female roles, without fundamentally altering history, the text, or all moral obligations.

== Feminist ethical approaches to Jewish theology ==
The definition of theology is understood as "the systematic and rational study of concepts of deity and of the nature of religious truths". Feminist ethics with the addition of a Jewish lens hosts a variety of theological opinions with differing views of what Feminist Jewish Ethics entails. While some discuss the language and figures of speech like metaphors, others weigh more heavily regarding the foundations of the religion and its male authoritative figures or simply the stories that tell the master-narrative, the juris-generative, communal ideas that re-calibrate the social norm.

Judith Plaskow wrote about use of masculine pronouns and the patriarchy dominated nature of Judaism. In her book, Standing Again at Sinai, she claims that there is "a sense of fluidity, movement, and multiplicity, [a] daring interweaving of women's experiences with Jewish, Native American, and Goddess imagery that leaves the reader/hearer with an expanded sense of what is possible in speaking of/to God". To Plaskow, the homogeneous use of language is one of the main proponents of the patriarchal nature of Judaism. Plaskow's theology, while fully acknowledging that the metaphors and images of God are man-made, notes that the language forms out of a societal standard. Therefore, when change occurs socially, so too must the method of approaching law. From Plaskow's perspective, "To expand Torah, we must reconstruct Jewish history to include the history of women, and in doing so alter the shape of Jewish memory." Plaskow's notions of relabeling and re-figuring the language used to describe higher power suggest that the current system of Judaism cannot continue in any form egalitarianism because, without common language, there will forever be a separation between male and female. Contrasting thinkers, like Tamar Ross, still see the need for an inclusion, but find that need to be inherently non-Jewish and in opposition to the fundamental theology on which the religion is based.

Within approaches to theology, however, the sole focus does not come from how God is or isn't addressed or the language surrounding a Feminist Jewish ethic. Many thinkers have stepped away from focusing on the language and instead, looked at the content. Rachel Adler suggests that halakha itself is too central to Judaism, that a perpetual cycle where men create the language and the law that all are expected to follow is detrimental to the future of Judaism, but that it is still necessary to the essence of Judaism. Blu Greenberg brought the phrase "where there is a rabbinic will, there is a halakhic way" to Jewish feminism in 1981, printed within the pages of her book On Women and Judaism. Greenberg's understanding of Jewish theology is contingent on the texts that have shaped its existence in the 21st century.

Rabbi Donna Berman, Ph.D. formed her theology through the method of Nashiut Ethics, an ethical system of "doing Jewish ethics" that revolves around lived experience, rather than the law or texts that are included within the greater Jewish canon. For Berman, those that have been marginalized will never be heard unless they are asked, unless their experiences are brought to the table to show what is true for the Jewish people within a societal context. Her ethical system is based on those found in Ada Maria Isasi-Diaz's mujerista theology and womanism, committed to equality and social justice, and strays farthest from presenting Jewish source texts or basing her thought in any form of Halakha, Jewish law. Berman's theology pieces together some of Adler and Plaskow's thoughts, while still pulling from completely different schools of thought within feminist Judaism. By uncovering the stories of the disenfranchised, Nashiut Ethics offers an opportunity to change the language that Judaism uses. According to Berman, the voices that were never heard before, those who never had the chance to speak up, either because they weren't asked anything or they weren't asked the right questions. Upon opening the doors for a new conversation, the barriers set forth by a patriarchal system are broken down. Through this methodology, Judaism can prosper and progress relative to society and the conditions of the time.

== Topics in Jewish practice ==
While ethicists are able to come up with Feminist approaches to Judaism, this often becomes complicated when examining specific rituals and practices of Judaism. When examining the practice and actions of Judaism, as opposed to the thoughts and beliefs, many issues arise. Before delving into each individually, it is important to remember that even within this alternative area of study, the issues take a slant towards catering to the normative, western individual's narrative. Deirdre Butler warns against this in her 'Disturbing Boundaries: Developing Jewish Feminist Ethics with Buber, Levinas, and Fackenheim' (2012).

"Similarly, the specific issues raised by normative narratives about able-bodiedness, heterosexuality, and gender identity in the Jewish tradition, let to experiences of marginalization and injustice that are too often not discerned by many Jewish feminists. Finally North American Jewish feminists need to be wary of the ways in which North Americans still dominate Jewish feminist discourse in the academy and at the level of activism"

=== Jewish liturgy ===
Almost all Jewish feminist ethicists struggle with finding women's place in the liturgy while still maintaining a level of tradition. However, within this there are a few different approaches; some believe that women need to find their place in what exists, other ethicists think that something new needs to be created. Others think that what exists needs to be reclaimed and reappropriated.

In 1990 Judith Plaskow introduced the consciousness of women being present at Sinai. While women were left out of the narrative of being present when the Jewish people received the Torah that does not mean that women do not have that claim over it; she argues it is up to women to engage in the reshaping of the reading of Torah as well as reshaping the Jewish community as a whole. She points out that Jewish feminists have continuously implemented rituals and written liturgy that come from women's experiences such as Rosh Chodesh or Feminist Haggadot for Pesach. To Plaskow, this is the most ethical way for women to own Jewish liturgy without denouncing traditional practice; as she believes that the current liturgy isn't something to dismiss. Rachel Adler takes a similar stance writing that inclusion and tradition are not enemies. That being said, she does think that it is harmful to push women to the peripheral and dangerous for them to accept marginalized prayer and practice. Therefore, for Adler this is not enough, as it does not actually impact Jewish liturgy as a whole. To her the ideal is taking the traditional liturgy that is in place and making it gender-inclusive, filling it with feminist imagery and language. Tova Hartman offers something different aligning herself with Maimonides and takes his permission to change the liturgy in order to "facilitate a greater sense of connection between the subjective self-image of the supplicants and words they use to pray". Still, this idea is complicated by the fact that it is challenging to create a universal meaningful prayer that connects to people's subjective experiences. Both Rachel Adler and Blu Greenberg argues that the first step to women finding their place in Jewish obligations and prayer is educating them on the intricacies of Halakha. Only from there can women be adequately integrated and take on leadership roles, truly redefining women's place in Judaism.

=== Jewish marriage and Agunah ===
All Jewish feminist ethicists see that there is a problem in the way the laws of a Jewish marriage are laid out; specifically they question the laws of Agunah. While it is almost universally challenged there is some variation in the nuances of where ethicists take issue with Agunah. Plaskow recognizes that when established the Rabbis were acting and making laws within a framework that had fundamental and systemic inequalities. While this is a law that is specifically oppressive and harmful, she sees it in the larger context of Jewish law which as whole both others and limits women. As an Orthodox Jew Blu Greenberg struggles with Agunah and the fact that she sees a place where Halakha as harmful. Greenberg acknowledges the potential for abuse in Jewish divorce law. Furthermore, in Greenberg's work of talking to and interviewing women she sees that despite there being some rabbis who resolve individual cases of divorce with compassion, the process as a whole is very humiliating for women [9].

Rachel Adler writes more extensively on the subject both critiquing Jewish marriage and offering an alternative model. Adler finds the traditional Halakha to be very much lacking a mutuality, pushing back on the scriptural description of marriage as ownership that is upheld by the rabbis in law. In creating a new model Adler looked for a way to bring mutuality in, balancing the needs of the individuals. Ultimately she settles on a template based on that of a business partnership as this lends itself to the communal standards that address economic and welfare issues. She calls this a theory of Brit Ahuvim, a contract of love. She recognizes the history of oppression and separation that women have faced and this is her attempt to work towards equality in marriage and divorce law while still refusing to reject Halakha; rather this is a reconstruction and reconfiguration of tradition.

=== Mikveh ===
One of the few existing rituals that is in place solely for women is the Mikveh. The idea of women purifying themselves in a ritual bath has caused much discussion and an overall lack of unity on if this practice is ethical and/or feminist. Hartman speaks to the ways that the Mikveh actually gives women power and enables them to use their bodies as sexual weapons. Essentially she is saying that because women decide when they go to the Mikveh and go through the purifying ritual they then have the power to withhold their bodies and withhold sex from their spouses. Greenberg 12 takes an alternative approach and through interviews finds that most women actually value and see the Mikveh as a positive ritual in Judaism and in their lives. While she briefly problematizes Mikvehs, mostly she focuses on how the ritual has been modernized and how women have come to feel grateful for the obligation. Adler 13 touches on the ethical implications of this ritual and what it means for women. Because she sees women as peripherally involved in Judaism she sees the practice of going to the Mikveh as perpetuating this. To Adler, while going to the Mikveh is a traditional ritual exclusively done by women, its purpose is to enable men to complete mitzvot. Adler sees it as such: women go to the mikveh and engage in this ritual of purification so that her husband can have intercourse with her and so that she will bear children - an exclusively male mitzvah. Thus, Adler sees this ritual as supremely unethical. Outside of these texts, there are currently many efforts working towards helping women reclaim this ritual and enabling them to have it be something empowering in their lives. Still, it cannot be ignored that there is a ritual in Jewish tradition that requires women to purify themselves in a way that has no parallel to male purification.

=== Niddah ===
Niddah is one of the most extensive rituals that women are required to perform in Judaism. The laws are very intricate and only the most educated rabbis, all of whom are men, have the authority and education to relay the rules to women. Because of this, and the nature of how women are forced to defer to male authority, many Jewish thinkers; including ethicists and feminists, see the laws and practices of Niddah as both unethical and anti-feminist.

In Tova Hartman's interviews of women who practice niddah she experienced a wide variety of reactions to and feelings on this ritual. While not all felt this way there were many who expressed feeling that this ritual was oppressive, dehumanizing, suffocating, demoralizing, and even a divestment of their personal power. The laws of niddah were established by men and opposed onto women. While niddah contributes to the hostility towards female sexuality, it is representative of the larger perspective towards the nature of sexuality in Judaism. Many women experience the law's rigidity and their obligation to adhere to them as causing both emotional and physical strain. This is further perpetuated by the authoritarian male structure that is in place. When describing the feelings they have when going through the process of having to go to a male rabbi and have him inspect the bloodstain, many touched on the aspect of a loss of their agency and power. While not specific to niddah, niddah is an extreme example of women being forced into passivity due to a lack of education; even though they are the ones forced to abide by the laws. The lack of power and impact that this ritual has on women, as well as its sheer rigor, has called into question how ethical it is from a Jewish and feminist perspective.

Despite a great amount of push-back, there are some women who see niddah as a positive part of their lives. Plaskow points out that it was women who strengthened the laws of niddah (although their motives are unknown). In Hartman's interviews she found that some appreciated the regulation it provided and how it respected women's biological-emotional needs. Similarly, there were some who spoke about how the ritual allowed them to focus on a transitional period, and others on how it sanctioned sexual desires within the framework of marriage. While problematic in its own right, some women were grateful for the protection it gave them against sexual advances they did not want to partake in. Greenberg sees niddah as Judaism's way of safeguarding women against becoming mere sex objects.

Tamara Ross sees the holiness in this practice as a means of seeing its ethicality. Ross sees the fixed period of separation from her husband that women go into as parallel to the periods of separation that God enters when affording the world the opportunity to amass new creative powers. There is also much written on this separation in regards to Jewish mysticism; seeing God as female and the force of purification and protection. By identifying niddah with holiness the necessity of this observance is confirmed. Similarly, doing this affirms women's own sense of self-worth by portraying God in their likeness. Some women express that niddah adds holiness to their primal, sexual urges. The argument is made that by reclaiming this observance and reappropriating it with the needs of women, this practice can be considered both ethical and feminist.

=== Sexuality ===
Sexuality, specifically female sexuality, is something that Judaism values. The idea of Onah, or male obligation to sexually satisfy his wife speaks to this. However, as Adler says, "The theological ethics of sexuality is to bridge the chasm between what is and what out to be". Female sexuality is seen and talked about in Judaism, as something possessed by men. The question of ethics comes in when examining the language used to talk about sexuality. Similarly to niddah, seeing the holiness in sexuality has allowed for sexuality to be seen in an ethical way.

One aspect of sexuality that Jewish feminist ethicists challenge is the heterocentrism that is implicit in Judaism and in traditional texts. Plaskow in particular accuses the authorities that have led the development of Jewish tradition, of creating and enforcing a system that condemns homosexuality and ignores lesbianism. She draws on her own experiences and identity, as well as different Jewish sources, in an attempt to redefine human sexuality as open and fluid; she offers a re-reading of biblical texts as a means of defining a new ethical.

=== Reproductive justice ===
As reproductive justice is an integral part of feminist activism and essential to the movement, Jewish feminists feel they must address this ethical issue. While Jewish ethics has its own approach to reproductive justice, Jewish feminist ethics offer something different. There is the recognition for many that as a mother and especially as a Jewish mother it is hard for these writers to think about abortion. Beyond that, there is the recognition that as Jewish women, it is hard for many to claim direction over their bodies given how much of halakhah takes this agency away from women. There is the constant trouble of trying to find a balance between the needs of women and the demands of halakhah – abortion is no exception to this struggle of Jewish feminist ethics.

David Kraemer offers a perspective that suggests it is possible to derive an ethical from traditional sources that fall outside of the ways of Halakha. He argues that it is not about deciding what is and is not permissible; rather it is about the fundamental values embedded in the tradition and asking the right questions. He makes the distinction between legal proscription and ethical imperative. While this argument is not distinct to abortion, or even reproductive justice as a whole, Kraemer sees women's needs in direct opposition to the Halakha and therefore sees being pro-choice as essential and permissible regardless.

== Contributing philosophies ==
Many of the theologians, authors, and ethicists who represent Feminist Jewish Ethics were inspired and influenced by previous thinkers and philosophies.

=== Carol Gilligan ===
Carol Gilligan is an American Jewish feminist and ethicist whose work has significantly influenced the Feminist Jewish Ethics movement. In her psychological studies, Gilligan is concerned with male and female differences in moral development. In her book In a Different Voice: Psychological Theory and Women's Development, Gilligan challenges preconceived notions, particularly in the field of psychology, that suggest that women lack the ability to understand and make moral judgments. She argues that men and women take different approaches to defining morality, which she concludes after interviewing women about their respective definitions and approaches to morality. Her findings showed that women are more apologetic and generally feel they have an obligation to help and care for others and act morally, whereas males tend to see morality as a matter of justice and respecting the rights of others.

Other Jewish ethicists have been influenced by Gilligan and have mentioned her in their respective works. In her book Expanding the Palace of Torah: Orthodoxy and Feminism, author Tamar Ross argues for a continued conversation allowing for a gradual process through which Orthodoxy can come to expand itself to include feminist thought and practices. Ross references Gilligan in order to define "feminism" simply for her readers and define "uniquely feminine ways of thinking", particularly when it comes to morality. Laurie Zoloth engages with Carol Gilligan's anthropological research and the assertion that women experience the world differently from men.

=== Emmanuel Levinas ===
Emmanuel Levinas was a French Jewish philosopher and Talmud Scholar who argues for the importance of a Jewish ethic. In his philosophical works, he distinguishes between totality and infinity, the latter referring to the spiritual world. Levinas argues that infinity extends beyond totality. He associates totality with ontology, and infinity with ethics, prioritizing ethics over ontology.

Levinas introduces the concept of the "Other", arguing that the needs of "the Other" should come before oneself, or "the I".

Deidre Butler—an author, professor, and feminist— examines Levinas from a feminist viewpoint. Butler is critical of Levinas in that he perpetuates binary oppositions, which place "feminine" and "masculine", and "self" and "other", on opposite ends of a spectrum. Butler asserts that "it is very difficult to disentangle a philosophical category that relies on stereotypes that both signal and enact the oppression and marginalization of women."

Laurie Zoloth, a medical ethics and religion professor at Northwestern University and author of Health Care and the Ethics of Encounter, also draws upon the works of Levinas. In her book, Zoloth analyzes and criticizes the healthcare crisis in America, maintaining that we should turn to the Jewish tradition in order to guide us in creating an appropriate ethic. Zoloth draws on Levinas' ethical theory and concept of the 'other,' in order to contextualize that the healthcare crisis is a problem within a community. For Levinas, a community is an organized group in which every individual sees themselves in relation to the 'other'. According to Zoloth, ethics cannot exist without a sense of community and the other; she stresses that ethical decisions are made with the 'other' in our consciousness. This thought is influenced by Levinas, who constantly stresses the importance of how one treats his or her neighbor, or the other. The concept of community and the 'other' also surrounds Jewish ethics because every individual is responsible for the 'other' and the community serves as a group of listeners; the voice of God also contains a sense of the 'other'. Zoloth explains that "the halakhic system uses the encounter with the Torah text and the encounter with the other's encounter with the text to create a continuous discursive community."

Feminist theory often describes women as being "otherized" – in a male-dominated culture, women are often viewed as "other" in relation to men.

=== Martin Buber ===
Martin Buber is a 20th-century philosopher who is known for his book I and Thou, in which he outlines two different kinds of relationships. An "I-it" relationship consists of an individual's attitude toward an object and is something that said individual experiences. In contrast, an "I-Thou" relationship involves two people who are participating, rather than experiencing. While the "I-Thou" relationship is considered stronger, both types of relationship are significant and bring the individuals involved closer to God. 5 An I-Thou relationship must involve both parties, but not necessarily to an equal extent.

Many feminists see the "I-Thou" relationship as essential to feminist thought, as it requires being "attentive to the Thou and precludes treating the Other as one's object."3 Feminism, by definition, suggests an equal status and power relations among men and women. Therefore, in order to apply this theology to feminist thought, one must ensure that the relationship is equal, as Buber suggests that the relationship can be unbalanced in some situations. Thus, Buber's philosophy from a Jewish feminist lens must be appropriated to "preclude unethical power relations."

=== Robert Cover ===
Robert Cover, a Yale law professor and scholar, has influenced many Jewish feminist ethicists, such as Rachel Adler. Cover suggests that there are two different types of law, imperialistic and jurisgenerative. Imperialistic law focuses on authority and the enforcement of rules, whereas jurisgenerative law constitutes communal ideas. Cover favors jurisgenerative style law in that it represents paidea, the highest ideal of the community. Cover distinguishes what is and what ought to be: what exists, and what the ideal is.

Rachel Adler, a Jew who was raised orthodox and initially married orthodox, divorced and became reform and was ordained incorporates Cover's theologies. She claims that halakhah, or Jewish law, serves as the connection between past and present Jewish worlds. Adapting Cover's terms, Adler sees imperialistic law as the way that halakhah currently functions and has functioned throughout time, according to Adler. Like Cover, however, Adler favors jurisgenerative law, as these are the ideals found in Adler's Master Narrative, or ethical ideal for the community. Unlike many other Jewish feminists, Adler does not reject halakhah, despite her acknowledgement that women's voices were excluded from the narrative.

=== Hermann Cohen ===
Hermann Cohen was a philosopher who lived from 1842 to 1918 and held many of the same philosophical beliefs as Immanuel Kant, but applied to Judaism. Cohen also sees ethics as what "ought to be" in the social world, as opposed to seeing what "is" as a current state of affairs that is unchangeable. According to Cohen, only God falls into both categories of what "is" and what "ought to be". According to Cohen, ethics are equivalent to what ought to be. Jewish feminist ethicists have used Cohen's Kantian ideas by expressing their ideals for equality for women in Judaism as what ought to be.

=== Sigmund Freud ===
Sigmund Freud, an Austrian psychologist and psychoanalyst who lived from 1856 to 1939. Freud's psychology still serves as the basis for psychological studies today. Tova Hartman, a professor, ethicist, and psychologist, studies Freud and incorporates some of his research into her book Feminism Encounters Traditional Judaism: Resistance and Accommodation. Hartman introduces three models of understanding Freudian concepts. She suggests that these models—the reaffirmation, reinterpretation/revisionist, and the rejection model—should be utilized to understand the Canon from a more feminist lens. The reaffirmation model suggests that any idea, so long as someone 'authoritative' posits it, should be accepted as true. This is problematic in a Jewish context in that it denotes that the canonical text and its authors are the sole authorities. The reinterpretation/revisionist model entails reappropriating and lending new meaning to concepts in the text without losing the value of the original context. When applying these models to the Jewish canon, Hartman favors the reinterpretation/revisionist approach for Jewish education, as it is the one that most "challenges its adherents to be in a constant state of engaging and reengaging with the traditional texts". The rejection model is also not ideal in that it would completely reject the entire Canon.

=== Womanist and Mujerista theologies ===
Womanism and Mujerista theologies have influenced scholars such as Rabbi Donna Berman, whose dissertation, Nashiut Ethics: Articulating a Jewish Feminist Ethics of Safekeeping, describes a new ethical approach to Jewish feminism. Nashiut Ethics is a form of Jewish Feminist Ethics that Berman develops that focuses not on Torah or halakhah, which she claims have "otherized" the woman's narrative, but on stories and experiences of women who have been neglected within the Jewish tradition. Like Nashiut ethics, womanist and mujerista theologies provide voices to justice-seeking women who have been neglected within their respective racial, ethnic, and religious groups.

Womanism is the movement that seeks to eliminate gender oppression specifically for black women. The movement incorporates literature, ethics, history, and everyday experiences, all of which focus on the black woman's narrative. Katie Cannon, in particular, is associated with the origins of the womanist movement. Cannon asserts that Black Women's voices have historically been ignored; she is one of many women in the womanist movement who was not ashamed to be perceived as radical or take risks. Nashiut ethics is inspired by this model for this reason. Berman asserts that, "Nashiut ethics, like womanist ethics, involves a transvaluation of values, a reclaiming of that which has been repressed and punished in the name of preserving a male constructed femininity which fosters the perpetuation of male power."

Along the same lines, mujerista theology provides insight into the perspectives, history, literature, and experiences of American Latina women. Ada Maria Isasi-Diaz, the theologian who founded the movement, is known for her use of ethnographic interviews of Latina women in her mujerista works. Influenced by Diaz, Berman makes use of ethnography in her dissertation to shed light on the neglected women's voices in Rabbinic Judaism.

Donna Berman specifies, that, like womanist and mujerista theologies, the purpose of Nashiut ethics is to create a place for women who have been neglected and "otherized" in history. Nashiut ethics incorporates the narratives of the feminist African American and Hispanic communities, as she is committed to creating equality and a voice for "every faith and racial/ethnic group."

== Criticism ==
While most Jewish feminist ethicists and thinkers agree that Judaism can be inadequate to the requirements of feminism, many have oppositional views towards methods of solving this problem, and are thus critical of each other's works. Some of this criticism occurs overtly, but much of it does not reference a specific author. Rather the criticism remains assumed; when one author puts forth an idea that disagrees with that of another, it can be understood to be a criticism of the other's work.

=== Modes of Criticism ===
For the most part, Jewish feminist thinkers seem to avoid specifically criticizing each other. Even authors like Tova Hartman and Rachel Adler, whose theologies and ideas are very dissimilar, avoid criticizing each other openly. While they disagree with each other's methodologies and opinions (see above), and respond to each other's works, open criticism is kept to a minimum within the genre.

References to other authors are most often used as positive examples, and focus on the commonalities between works, rather than the differences. Disagreeing authors, rather than attacking the works of another, will often let their works speak for themselves, setting themselves up as another option in thought, rather than an opponent. Despite the great divides in opinion and the many disagreements, actual criticism rarely occurs.

=== Specific moments of criticism ===
==== Feminist liturgical methods ====
Many Jewish feminist thinkers, including Judith Plaskow and Rachel Adler support the addition of female-centered language into the liturgy. Some authors disagree with this premise. Cynthia Ozick, for example, is very critical of this technique, and argues that using female god language would be equivalent to the reassumption of idolatry. For her, referring to God as "Queen of the universe" (rather than "King of the universe" harkens back to the fertility cults of ancient goddesses, and would be unacceptable. Plaskow adamantly disagrees with Ozick here. In her work Standing Again at Sinai, Plaskow criticizes Ozick's arguments, saying that these new prayers do not set up a Goddess next to God, but rather expand God's image.

==== Feminist theologies ====
Plaskow, Adler, and Ozick often criticized each other's works, using essays to respond to each other. Plaskow's article "The Right Question is Theological" is a refutation of Adler's "The Jew Who Wasn't There" and Ozick's "Notes Toward the Right Direction." In her article, Plaskow criticizes Ozick and Adler for being too focused on making changes to halakha to fit feminist needs, and for not discussing Judaism's underlying theological problems. Plaskow is especially critical of Ozick's 1979 article"Notes toward finding the right question," in which Ozick argues that Judaism does not inherently subordinate women, but rather that the subordination Jewish women face come from "historical custom and practice." In her article, Plaskow argues against this statement, saying that Judaism's underlying theology is problematic in and of itself. But in her discussion of Ozick, Plaskow is less critical of Ozick's ideas than of her silence on the issue of theology. Plaskow wants to expand the discussion on theology; it is Ozick's unwillingness to do so that prompts Plaskow's criticism. Adler responded to the criticism that she was overly focused on halakha by writing first an article, then a book, outlying ideas regarding Jewish feminist theology.
