= Christian views on lying =

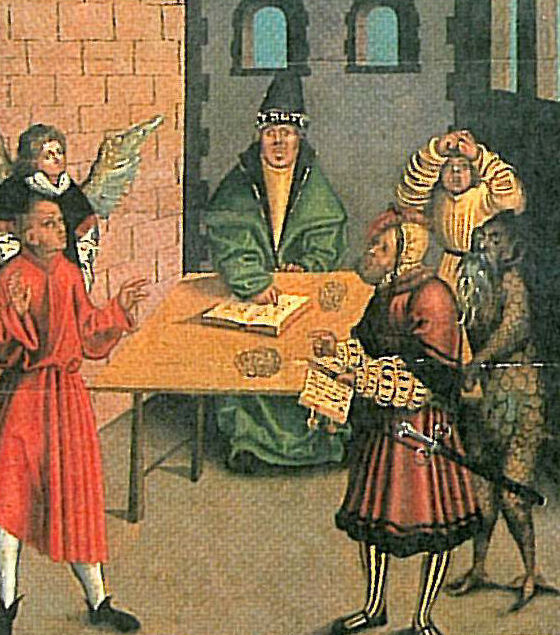
You shall not bear false witness against your neighbor, Lucas Cranach the elder

Lying is strongly discouraged and forbidden by most interpretations of Christianity. Arguments for this are based on various biblical passages, especially "Thou shalt not bear false witness against thy neighbour", one of the Ten Commandments. Christian theologians disagree as to the exact definition of "lie" and whether it is ever acceptable.

== Biblical passages ==
One of the Ten Commandments is "Thou shalt not bear false witness against thy neighbour"; for this reason, lying is generally considered as a sin in Christianity. The story of Naboth in 1 Kings 21 provides an example where false witness leads to an unjust outcome. The exact interpretation of the commandment is disputed: "Does the commandment pertain only to court or does it prohibit lying in general? Is it only a prohibition (not to lie in court, not ever to lie) or does it imply a positive injunction (truth-telling in court, truth-telling in general)? If positive, is one enjoined only to truth-telling or to veracity and honesty also?" Other statements in the Bible express a negative view of lying, such as "You shall not steal, nor deal falsely, nor lie to one another" (Leviticus 19:11) and "Cursed is he who does the work of the Lord deceitfully" (Jeremiah 48:10).

In the Hebrew Bible, those who practice lying and deceit are seemingly rewarded for their actions, posing problems for an exegesis that upholds a categorical prohibition. Examples include the Hebrew midwives who lie after Pharaoh commands them to kill all newborn boys (Exodus 1:17–21), and Rahab (Joshua 2:1–7; cf. Hebrews 11:31), an innkeeper who lies to soldiers while hiding spies in her inn. The midwives appear to be rewarded for their actions (God "dealt well with the midwives” and "gave them families"). James 2:25 appears to praise Rahab as an example of good works: "And in the same way was not also Rahab the prostitute justified by works when she received the messengers and sent them out by another way?" In the Book of Judith, Judith deceives Holofernes in order to assassinate him. Both Abraham and Isaac claimed that their wives were their sisters.

== Early Christian views ==
Among early Christian writers, there existed differing viewpoints regarding the ethics of deception and dishonesty in certain circumstances. Some argued that lying and dissimulation could be justified for reasons such as saving souls, convincing reluctant candidates to accept ordination, or demonstrating humility by refraining from boasting about one's virtues. Supporters of this position often referred to Paul's statement about becoming all things to all men in order to win them over as a basis for their arguments.

== Patristic views ==
Augustine devoted much attention to lying, which he contended was always wrong. He discussed the topic in four works (De magistro, De doctrina christiana, De trinitate, and Enchiridion) and wrote two treatises, De mendacio and Contra mendacium, specifically on the subject of lies. According to Augustine, only four types of falsehood were not lies, because there was no desire to deceive: explanation of someone else's viewpoint, repetition of memorized words, a slip of the tongue, or misspeaking. Augustine distinguished different situations of lying by blameworthiness, but argued that every lie was a sin. The consensus among scholars is that Augustine did not accept any lies as necessary or justified, even to save an innocent life.

However, there was an equally strong patristic tradition that defended lying for a worthwhile cause and considered it necessary or even righteous in some cases. Exponents of this view include Pseudo-Maximus, Clement of Alexandria, Origen, Hilary of Poitiers, John Cassian, John Chrysostom, Dorotheus of Gaza, Palladius of Antioch, John Climacus, and Paulinus of Nola. This second patristic tradition was summarized by Ambrose of Milan, whose argument, based on scripture, held that Judith's action was meritorious because "she undertook for religion, not love... she served religion... and the fatherland".

== Later views ==
Notable Christian theologians who argued that lying was never permissible for Christians include Thomas Aquinas and John Calvin. Both Augustine and Aquinas held that it was always possible to take a correct and blameless action in any circumstance. Some Waldensians weren't strongly opposed to lying if necessary for survival. Defenders of lying in some cases, such as Cassian and H. Tristram Engelhardt, tended to hold the opposite view: that sometimes true moral dilemmas arise.

Martin Luther argued that it is permissible to go as far as swearing an Oath in a lie in his commentary on Matthew. where taking an oath of any sort, even if followed through is deemed impermissible, possibly using Paul's oath (1 Cor. 9:20), or unhonored oaths from the Crusades for his reasoning.

So that some have stretched their conscience so tightly, that one doubts whether one ought to take a solemn oath not to avenge himself when he is set free from prison, or whether we are by an oath to make peace and a treaty with the Turks... As, if it should come to pass, that we would make a treaty and concord with our enemies or the Turks.

— Martin Luther, Commentary on the Sermon on the Mount,

In the twentieth century, Dietrich Bonhoeffer and Reinhold Niebuhr also took a non-absolutist position. In Ethics, Bonhoeffer discusses Kantian ethics and contests the Kantian view of lying, because "Treating truthfulness as a principle leads Kant to the grotesque conclusion that if asked by a murderer whether my friend, whom he was pursuing, had sought refuge in my house, I would have to answer honestly in the affirmative." Although he maintained that one should lie to save his friend in that situation, Bonhoeffer argued that either option incurred guilt. In a later essay, “What Does It Mean to Tell the Truth?”, Bonhoeffer argued that "Lying … is and ought to be understood as something plainly condemnable" and that it did not always incur guilt.

Professor Allen Verhey argued that lying is not always wrong, because "We live the truth not for its own sake, but for God's sake and for the neighbor's sake." The Catechism of the Catholic Church states that lying is always wrong. Different definitions of lying exist, such that Christians do not agree that all deception counts as "lying". Catholic writer and new natural law philosopher Christopher Tollefsen has also argued that lying is never permissible for Christians. In a review of Tollefsen's book, John Skalko stated that this is an unpopular and widely criticized view.

== Public opinion ==
According to a 2016 Pew Research Center survey, 67% of Christians in the United States, including 81% of those who defined themselves as "highly religious", agreed that "Being honest at all times" was "essential" to their Christian identity. According to the 2014 Pew Religious Landscape study in the US, the Christian group that had the highest rate of telling white lies were Black Protestants.

== See also ==
- Jewish views on lying
- Taqiya

== Sources ==
- Blacketer, Raymond (2008). "No Escape by Deception: Calvin's Exegesis of Lies and Liars in the Old Testament". Reformation & Renaissance Review. 10 (3): 267–289. doi:10.1558/rrr.v10i3.267. S2CID 159926220.
- Colish, Marcia L. (2005). "Rethinking Lying in the Twelfth Century". In Bejczy, István; Newhauser, Richard (eds.). Virtue and Ethics in the Twelfth Century. Brill. pp. 155–173. doi:10.1163/9789047407270_010. ISBN 9789047407270.
- Decosimo, David (2010). "Just Lies: Finding Augustine's Ethics of Public Lying in His Treatments of Lying and Killing". The Journal of Religious Ethics. 38 (4): 661–697. doi:10.1111/j.1467-9795.2010.00458.x. ISSN 0384-9694. JSTOR 40925929.
- Griffiths, Paul J. (2004). Lying: An Augustinian Theology of Duplicity. Wipf and Stock Publishers. ISBN 978-1-60899-491-5.
- Mathewes, Charles (2010). "Lying — Christianity". Understanding Religious Ethics. John Wiley & Sons. pp. 126–130. ISBN 978-1-4051-3351-7.
- du Preez, Ron (1998). "A Holocaust of Deception: Lying to Save Life and Biblical Morality". Journal of the Adventist Theological Society. 9 (1): 187–220. Archived from the original on 2017-08-22.
- Puffer, Matthew (2016). "Retracing Augustine's Ethics: Lying, Necessity, and the Image of God". Journal of Religious Ethics. 44 (4): 685–720. doi:10.1111/jore.12159. Archived from the original on 2020-03-18.
- Puffer, Matthew (2019). "Three Rival Versions of Moral Reasoning: Interpreting Bonhoeffer's Ethics of Lying, Guilt, and Responsibility". Harvard Theological Review. 112 (2): 160–183. doi:10.1017/S001781601900004X. S2CID 166767444.
- Ramsey, Boniface (1985). "Two Traditions on Lying and Deception in the Ancient Church". The Thomist: A Speculative Quarterly Review. 49 (4): 504–533. doi:10.1353/tho.1985.0001. S2CID 171489661.
- Skalko, John (2016). "Lying and Christian Ethics by Christopher O. Tollefsen". Review. Nova et Vetera. 14 (3): 1045–1048. doi:10.1353/nov.2016.0066. S2CID 171800944.
- Skalko, John (2019). Disordered Actions: A Moral Analysis of Lying and Homosexual Activity. Editiones Scholasticae. ISBN 978-3-86838-218-1.
- Spoerl, Joseph S. (2015). "Lying and Christian Ethics. By Christopher O. Tollefsen". Review. The Journal of Theological Studies. 66 (2): 900–902. doi:10.1093/jts/flv111. Archived from the original on 2020-09-17.
- Swezey, Charles M. (1980). "Exodus 20:16 — 'Thou Shalt Not Bear False Witness Against Thy Neighbor.'". Interpretation: A Journal of Bible and Theology. 34 (4): 405–410. doi:10.1177/002096438003400408. S2CID 159952953.
- Tollefsen, Christopher O. (2014). Lying and Christian Ethics. Cambridge University Press. ISBN 978-1-139-86829-7.
- Torrance, I. R. (2003). "Confidentiality and its limits: some contributions from Christianity". Journal of Medical Ethics. 29 (1): 8–9. doi:10.1136/jme.29.1.8. PMC 1733672. PMID 12569186.
- Weiss, Shira (2017). "The Ethics of Deception in Biblical Narrative". Journal of Jewish Ethics. 3 (1): 1–27. doi:10.5325/jjewiethi.3.1.0001.
- Zagorin, Perez (1990). Ways of Lying: Dissimulation, Persecution and Conformity in Early Modern Europe. Harvard University Press. ISBN 978-0-674-86636-2.
- Zagorin, Perez (1996). "The Historical Significance of Lying and Dissimulation". Social Research. 63 (3): 863–912. ISSN 0037-783X. JSTOR 40972318.
