= Jewish ethics =

Jewish ethics are the ethics of the Jewish religion or the Jewish people. A type of normative ethics, Jewish ethics may involve issues in Jewish law as well as non-legal issues, and may involve the convergence of Judaism and the Western philosophical tradition of ethics.

== Literature ==
=== Biblical and rabbinic ===
Ethical traditions can be found throughout the Hebrew Bible and the rabbinic Oral Torah that both interpreted the Hebrew Bible and engaged in novel topics.

Ethics is a key aspect of rabbinic legal literature, Halakha, which is found in the Mishnah, Talmud, and other texts. Ethics is also a key aspect of non-legal aggadah. The best-known text of Rabbinic Judaism associated with ethics is Pirkei Avot (Ethics of the Fathers) of the Mishnah.

=== Medieval ===
Direct Jewish responses to Greek ethics may be seen in major rabbinic writings in the medieval period. Notably, Maimonides offers a Jewish interpretation of Aristotle (e.g., Nicomachean Ethics), who enters into Jewish discourse through Islamic writings. Maimonides, in turn, influenced Thomas Aquinas, a dominant figure in Christian ethics and the natural law tradition of Christian moral theology. The relevance of natural law to medieval Jewish philosophy is a matter of dispute among scholars.

Medieval and early modern rabbis also created a pietistic tradition of Jewish ethics. This ethical tradition was given expression through Musar literature, which presents virtues and vices in a didactic way. The Hebrew term musar, derived from a word meaning "discipline" or "correction", is often translated as ethics, morality, moral instruction, or moral discipline.

Examples of medieval Musar literature include:

- Chovot HaLevavot (Duties of the Heart) by Bahya ibn Paquda
- Ma'alot ha-Middot by Jehiel ben Jekuthiel Anav of Rome
- Orchot Tzaddikim (The Ways of the Righteous), by an anonymous author
- Kad ha-Kemah by Bahya ben Asher

Halakhic writings of the Middle Ages also inform the Jewish ethical corpus. Important sources of Jewish ethical law include Maimonides's 12th-century Mishneh Torah and Rabbi Joseph Karo's and Rabbi Moses Isserles's Shulkhan Arukh (16th century), especially the order entitled Choshen Mishpat. A wide array of topics on ethics is also discussed in medieval responsa literature.

=== Modern ===
In the modern period, Jewish ethics sprouted many offshoots, partly due to developments in modern ethics and partly due to the formation of distinct Jewish religious movements. Trends in modern Jewish normative ethics include:

- The pietistic Musar movement was continued by 18th-century rabbis like Moshe Chaim Luzzatto in his book Mesillat Yesharim. Other Musar writings were authored by Haskalah writers like Naphtali Herz Wessely and Menachem Mendel Lefin.
- The Musar tradition was revived by the 19th-century Musar movement within the Orthodox Ashkenazi Jewish community.
- The 19th- and early 20th-century Reform movement promoted Judaism as the original ethical monotheism. The writings of Abraham Geiger and Kaufmann Kohler show this approach.
- In the 20th and 21st centuries, liberal Reform and Reconstructionist rabbis have fostered novel approaches to Jewish ethics, for example, in the writings of Eugene Borowitz and David Teutsch. Some Reform rabbis, as well as Orthodox and Conservative rabbis, have also engaged in applied ethics by writing legal responsa (formal opinions), especially on bioethics, sexual ethics, and business ethics. Leading Conservative ethicists such as the philosopher and rabbi Elliot Dorff have also written extensively on moral theory.
- In the 20th and 21st centuries, Jewish feminism has produced feminist Jewish ethics, using the principles of feminist ethics. Leading Jewish feminist ethicists include Judith Plaskow, Rachel Adler, Tamar Ross, Rebecca Alpert, and Laurie Zoloth.
- Other modern Jewish philosophers have pursued a range of ethical approaches, with varying degrees of reliance upon traditional Jewish sources. Notably, Hermann Cohen authored Religion of Reason in the tradition of Kantian ethics. Martin Buber wrote on various ethical and social topics, including the dialogical ethics of his I and Thou. Hans Jonas, a student of Martin Heidegger, draws upon phenomenology in his writings on bioethics, technology, and responsibility. Emmanuel Levinas sought to distinguish his philosophical and Jewish writings; nevertheless, some scholars are constructing Jewish ethics around his innovative and deeply Jewish approach.

Academic scholars of Judaism have also engaged in descriptive Jewish ethics, the study of Jewish moral practices and theory, which is situated more in the disciplines of history and the social sciences than in ethics proper (see Newman 1998).

In 2003, the Society of Jewish Ethics was founded as the academic organization "dedicated to the promotion of scholarly work in the field of Jewish ethics." The Society promotes both normative research (the field of ethics proper) and descriptive (historical/social scientific) research.

== Central virtues and principles ==
=== Major themes in biblical ethics ===
The writings attributed to the biblical prophets exhort all people to lead a righteous life. Kindness to the needy, benevolence, faith, compassion for the suffering, a peace-loving disposition, and a truly humble and contrite spirit, are the virtues which many Prophets hold up for emulation, although Samuel and Moses were important exceptions, for Samuel urged the massacre of all Amalekites, including women and children, and Moses, concerning the Midianites, said "Now therefore kill every male among the little ones, and kill every woman that hath known man by lying with him. But all the women children, that have not known man by lying with him, keep alive for yourselves."

Civic loyalty, even to a foreign ruler, is urged as a duty (Jer. 29:7). "Learn to do good" is the keynote of the prophetic appeal (Isa. 1:17). Prophets yearn for an era of peace and righteousness; war will be no more (Isa. 2:2 et seq.).

=== Summaries of classical rabbinic ethics ===
Hillel the Elder formulated a version of the Golden Rule: "What is hateful to you, do not do unto others". Rabbi Akiva stated "Whatever you hate to have done to you, do not do to your neighbor; therefore do not hurt him; do not speak ill of him; do not reveal his secrets to others; let his honor and his property be as precious to you as your own".

Rabbi Akiva also declared the commandment "thou shalt love thy neighbor as thyself" to be the greatest fundamental commandment of the Jewish doctrine (compare to Great Commandment). Ben Azzai, in reference to this, said that a still greater principle was found in the Scriptural verse, "This is the book of the generations of Adam [origin of man]. In the day that God created man [Adam], in the likeness of God made he him".

Rabbi Simlai taught "613 commandments were given to Moses; then David came and reduced them to eleven in Psalm 15; Isaiah (33:15), to six; Micah (6:8), to three: 'To act justly and to love mercy and to walk humbly with your God'; Isaiah again (56:1), to two: 'Maintain justice, and do what is right'; and Habakkuk (2:4), to one: 'The righteous person lives by his faithfulness'."

=== Justice, truth, and peace ===
Rabbi Simeon ben Gamaliel taught: "The world rests on three things: justice, truth, and peace".

Justice, being God's, must be vindicated, whether the object is of great or small value. "Let justice pierce the mountain" is the characteristic maxim attributed to Moses. Stealing and oppression, even if only in holding back overnight the hired man's earnings, are forbidden.

Falsehood, flattery, perjury and false swearing are also forbidden. The reputation of a fellow man is sacred. Tale-bearing and unkind insinuations are forbidden, as is hatred of one's brother in one's heart. A revengeful, relentless disposition is unethical; reverence for old age is inculcated; justice shall be done; right weight and just measure are demanded; poverty and riches shall not be regarded by the judge. We are taught to attempt judging others LeKaf Z'Chut, giving more weight to an assumed side of merit, yet advised what can be translated as Respect but Suspect (ChabDeiHu VeChashDeiHu).

Shalom ("peace") is one of the underlying principles of the Torah, as "her ways are pleasant ways and all her paths are shalom ('peace')." Proverbs 3:17 The Talmud explains, "The entire Torah is for the sake of the ways of shalom". Maimonides comments in his Mishneh Torah: "Great is peace, as the whole Torah was given in order to promote peace in the world, as it is stated, 'Her ways are pleasant ways and all her paths are peace.'"

=== Loving-kindness and compassion ===
Simon the Just taught: "The world rests upon three things: Torah, service to God, and showing loving-kindness (chesed)". Loving-kindness is here the core ethical virtue.

Loving-kindness is closely linked with compassion in the tradition. Lack of compassion marks people as cruel. The Torah repeatedly commands the Prophets to protect the widow, the orphan and the stranger.

Friendship is also highly prized in the Talmud; the very word for "associate" is "friend" ("chaver"). "Get thyself a companion". "Companionship or death".

Respect for one's fellow humans is of such importance that Biblical prohibitions may be transgressed on its account. For example, the unclaimed dead must be given respectful burial.

=== Health and self-respect ===
In addition to teaching caring for others, Jewish sources tend to teach that humans are duty-bound to preserve their lives and health. Foods dangerous to health are more to be guarded against than those ritually forbidden. Jewish ethics denies self-abasement. "He who subjects himself to needless self-castigations and fasting, or even denies himself the enjoyment of wine, is a sinner". People have to give account for every lawful enjoyment they refuse. A person should show self-respect in regard to both one's body, "honoring it as the image of God", and one's garments. According to Judaism, real-life goes beyond the concept of breathing and having blood flow through our veins, it means existing with a purpose and connecting to God and others.

== Areas of applied Jewish ethics ==
=== Business ethics ===
In the Torah, there are more commandments concerning the kashrut (fitness) of one's money than the kashrut of food. These laws are developed and expanded upon in the Mishnah and the Talmud (particularly in Order Nezikin). The weights attached is evidenced via the widely quoted tradition (Talmud Shabbat 31a) that in one's judgement in the next world, the first question asked is: "were you honest in business?"

Laws concerning business ethics are delineated in the major codes of Jewish law (e.g. Mishneh Torah, 12th century; Shulhan Arukh, particularly Choshen Mishpat, 16th century). A wide array of topics on business ethics are discussed in the responsa literature. Business ethics received special emphasis in the teaching of Rabbi Yisrael Lipkin Salanter (19th century), founder of the Musar movement in Eastern Europe. Enforcing laws regarding the proper treatment of workers in the food industry has been central to the efforts of Conservative Judaism's Hekhsher Tzedek commission and its 2008 approval of a responsum by Rabbi Jill Jacobs which required paying workers in accordance with Jewish law and treating workers with dignity and respect.

=== Charitable giving ===
The Jewish idea of righteousness ("tzedakah") gives the owner of property no right to withhold from the poor their share. According to Maimonides in the Mishneh Torah, the highest level of tzedakah is giving charity that will allow the poor to break out of the poverty cycle and become independent and productive members of society. Tzedakah may come in the form of giving an interest-free loan to a person in need; forming a partnership with a person in need; giving a grant to a person in need; finding a job for a person in need; so long as that loan, grant, partnership, or job results in the person no longer living by relying upon others.

Traditional Jews commonly practice "ma'aser kesafim", tithing 10% of their income to support those in need. The Rabbis decreed (against Essene practice, and against the advice given in the New Testament) that one should not give away much, most or all of their possessions. They did not expect a supernatural savior to come and take care of the poor, and so they held that one must not make oneself poor. Given that nearly all Jews of their day were poor or middle-class (even the rich of that time were only rich relative to the poor), they ruled that one should not give away more than a fifth of his income to charity, while yet being obligated to give away no less than 10% of his income to charity.

Many pages of the Talmud are devoted to encouragement in giving charity, and this topic is the focus of many religious books and rabbinic responsa.

In addition to voluntary individual donations to the poor, the Mishnah required communities to supply each person in need with daily food rations and a place to sleep, funded by collections from the population.

=== Ethics of speech ===
Evil-speaking is a sin regarded with intense aversion both in the Bible and in rabbinical literature. The technical term for it in the latter is lashon hara, "the evil tongue". In the Bible, the equivalent words are: dibbah, meaning "talk" in a sinister sense; rakhil, the "merchandise" of gossip with which the talebearer goes about; and ragal, a verb, denoting the "peddling" of slander. As these words indicate, that which is condemned as lashon hara denotes all the deliberate or malicious accusations or even the exposure of truthful information which has the purpose of injuring one's neighbor, that is, calumny proper, and also the idle but mischievous chatter which is equally forbidden, though it is not slander. The Babylonian Talmud indicates that putting one's fellow human to shame is in the same category as murder and at one point describes slander, talebearing, and evil talk as worse than the three cardinal sins of murder, immorality, and idolatry. The spreading of evil reports, even when true, is branded as a calumny. Listening to slanderous gossip, or the causing of suspicion, or the provoking of unfavorable remarks about a neighbor is also forbidden.

One commandment in the Torah is to use one's speech to correct, admonish, or reprove others (Leviticus 19:17). Some Jews have explained this as a matter of "giving musar" (discipline, instruction) in line with a verse from Proverbs 1:8: "Hear, my child, the discipline (musar) of your father, and do not forsake the teachings of your mother." Some rabbis have emphasized the importance of what to say when giving musar, to whom one should speak, and when (how often) one should "give musar". Rabbi Yisroel Belsky said that when there is a need to give musar to a friend: "Give musar as a friend." Some musar is on topics that are a major part of everyday life, such as consoling mourners and visiting the sick. Rabbi Shimon Schwab taught that although "[at times] you must give musar" the command to do so (Lev. 19:17) is followed by love your neighbor as yourself. and that "if you want ..(someone).. to change, (it must be) done through love."

=== Jewish family ethics ===
The Jewish tradition gives great stress to reverence for parents. More Orthodox forms of Judaism view the father as the head of the family, while seeing the mother as entitled to honor and respect at the hands of sons and daughters. More liberal Jews view the mother and father as equal in all things.

The family plays a central role in Judaism, both socially and in transmitting the traditions of the religion. To honor one's father and mother is one of the Ten Commandments. Jewish families try to have close, respectful family relationships, with care for both the elderly and the young. Religious observance is an integral part of home life, including the weekly Sabbath and keeping kosher dietary laws. The Talmud tells parents to teach their children a trade and survival skills, and children are asked to look after their parents.

=== Marriage and sexual relations ===
Marriage is called kiddushin, or 'making holy', often understood as meaning that it is an institution imbued with holiness. Monogamy is widely seen as the ideal. Celibacy is regarded as contrary to the injunction to be fruitful and multiply (Genesis 2:18 and Isaiah 45:18). According to the Talmud and midrash, man is enjoined to take a wife and obtain posterity. "He who lives without a wife lives without joy and blessing, without protection and peace"; he is "not a complete man", and for it, he has to give reckoning at the great Judgement Day.

Orthodox rabbis almost universally oppose sex before marriage, whereas some non-Orthodox rabbis see sex before marriage as permissible.

The laws of niddah prohibit sexual relations during the time of a woman's period. After her period has ended, a woman is expected to fully immerse herself in a mikveh (the ritual immersion pool), entering a state of ritual purity. Sexual relations may then resume. Married couples need to find other ways of expressing their love for each other during the niddah period, and some say that the time of abstention enhances the relationship. Most non-Orthodox Jews have rejected these laws regarding abstinence during menstruation.

Orthodox Jews view male homosexuality as explicitly prohibited by the Torah, but other Jews view various forms of homosexual behavior or all forms of homosexual behavior as permitted by the tradition.

In Judaism, extramarital sex is widely frowned upon. Jewish ethics across denominations agrees that adultery and incestual relationships (Leviticus 18:6–23) are prohibited.

=== Medical ethics and bioethics ===
Jewish medical ethics is one of the major spheres of contemporary Jewish ethics. Beginning primarily as an applied ethics based on halakhah, more recently it has broadened to bioethics, weaving together issues in biology, science, medicine and ethics, philosophy and theology. Jewish bioethicists are usually rabbis who have been trained in medical science and philosophy, but may also be experts in medicine and ethics who have received training in Jewish texts. The goal of Jewish medical ethics and bioethics is to use Jewish law and tradition and Jewish ethical thought to determine which medical treatments or technological innovations are moral, when treatments may or may not be used, etc.

=== Political governance ===
The ethics of proper governance is the subject of much contention among Jews. Various models of political authority are developed in the Hebrew Bible, rabbinic literature, and later Jewish literature. Many prominent Jewish thinkers, such as Maimonides, see monarchy as a moral ideal, while others, such as Abravanel, disparage the model of the monarchy. Modern Jews have championed a variety of Jewish political movements, often based on their conceptions of Jewish ethics.

=== Ethics of warfare ===
Jewish war ethics are developed by Maimonides in his "Laws of Kings and their Wars", part of his Mishneh Torah, where he treats on both a Mandatory war and a Voluntary war. Modern Jewish war ethics have been developed especially in relation to the Israeli military's doctrine of purity of arms.

=== Capital punishment ===
The Jewish Bible says murderers should be executed but even in ancient times Jewish leaders were hostile to capital punishment, and the Talmud requires conditions for application of the death penalty so extremely stringent that the death penalty became effectively impossible.

=== Relationship to non-Jews ===
Jews widely believe that non-Jews who follow the seven laws of Noah will be equally recognized by God. According to rabbinic interpretation of Genesis 2:6 and 9:4, the laws of the Noachide code are: do not commit idolatry; do not blaspheme God; do not murder; do not steal; do not commit adultery; do not eat meat cut from a living animal; and establish courts of justice.

The principle of Kiddush Hashem requires Jews to conduct themselves in every way as to prevent the name of God from being dishonored by non-Israelites. The greatest sin of fraud, therefore, is that committed against a non-Israelite, because it may lead to the reviling of God's name. A desire to sanctify the name of God may help to motivate some Jews to treat adherents of other creeds with the utmost fairness and equity.

Classical sources teach that Jews must support the non-Jewish poor, bury the non-Jewish dead, comfort the non-Jewish mourner, and visit the non-Jewish sick.

Exhortations to love the stranger "as yourself" (Ex. 22:20; Lev. 19:33) and "Remember the stranger, for you were strangers in the land of Egypt" (Deuteronomy 10:19), have an important role in many forms of Jewish ethics.

=== Treatment of animals ===
According to Jewish tradition, animals have a right to be treated well, even ones that might belong to one's enemy. The Biblical commands regarding the treatment of animals are amplified in rabbinical ethics, and a special term is coined for the prohibition on causing suffering to animals ("tza'ar ba'alei hayyim"). Not to sit down to the table before the domestic animals have been fed is a lesson derived from Deuteronomy 11:15. Compassion for animals is declared to have been the merit of Moses which made him the shepherd of his people, while Judah ha-Nasi saw in his own ailment the punishment for having once failed to show compassion for a frightened calf.

Consideration for animals is an important part of Judaism. It is part of the Noachide code. Resting on the Sabbath also meant providing rest for the working animals, and people are instructed to feed their animals before they sit down to eat. At harvest time, the working animals must not be muzzled, so that they can eat of the harvest as they work. All animals must be kept in adequate conditions. Sports like bullfighting are forbidden. Animals may be eaten as long as they are killed using shechitah, a method where the animal has its throat cut using a specially sharpened knife. Jewish butchers are trained in this method which must meet the requirements of kashrut.

Enforcing laws regarding the treatment of animals in the certification of food products has been part of the effort of Conservative Judaism's Hekhsher Tzedek commission.

In modern times, a Jewish vegetarian movement has emerged, led by Jews who believe that Jewish ethics demands vegetarianism or veganism.

=== Environmental ethics ===
The Book of Genesis 1:26 indicates that God gave people control over the animals and earth, while Genesis 2:15 emphasizes that people were put in the world to maintain it and care for it. The Talmud teaches the principle of Bal tashkhit, which some take to mean that wasting or destroying anything on earth is wrong. Many take the view that pollution is an insult to the created world, and it is considered immoral to put commercial concerns before care for God's creation. However, humans are regarded as having a special place in the created order, and their well-being is paramount. Humans are not seen as just another part of the ecosystem, so moral decisions about environmental issues have to take account of the well-being of humans.

Trees and other things of value also come within the scope of rabbinical ethics, as their destruction is prohibited, according to Deut. 20:19 as understood by the Babylonian Talmud. In modern times, a Jewish environmentalist movement has emerged, led by Jews who believe that Jewish ethics demands environmentalism.

== See also ==
- Ethics in religion
- Hashkafa
- Jewish customs of etiquette
- Tikkun olam
- Yeshiva § Ethics, mysticism and philosophy
