= Eighth Commandment =

The Eighth Commandment of the Ten Commandments may refer to:

- "Thou shall not steal", under the Phenolic division used by Hellenistic Jews, Greek Orthodox, and Protestants except Lutherans, or the Talmudic division of the third-century Jewish Talmud
- "Thou shalt not bear false witness against thy neighbor", under the Augustinian division used by Roman Catholics and Lutherans

== Other uses ==
- "8th Commandment", a song from the Sonata Arctica album Ecliptica (1999)
