= Ninth Commandment =

The Ninth Commandment of the Ten Commandments could refer to:

- "Thou shalt not bear false witness against thy neighbor" under the Philonic division used by Hellenistic Jews, Greek Orthodox and Protestants except Lutherans, or the Talmudic division of the third-century Jewish Talmud.
- "Thou shalt not covet" under the Augustinian division used by Roman Catholics and Lutherans. Roman Catholics consider the prohibition on coveting one's neighbor's wife as the ninth commandment while Lutherans make it wife, servants, or anything else.
