= Orchot Tzaddikim =

Book on Jewish ethics

Orchot Tzaddikim (Hebrew: אָרְחוֹת צַדִּיקִים, romanized: ‘orḥôt ṣaddîqîm, lit. 'Ways of the Righteous [Ones]') is a book on Jewish ethics written in Germany in the 15th century that is included in the Musar literature; it was first entitled Sefer ha-Middot (סֵפֶר הַמִּדּוֹת, 'Book [of] the Qualities') by the author but called Orḥot Ẓaddiḳim by a later copyist. Under this title, a Yiddish translation, from which the last chapter and some other passages were omitted, was printed at Isny in 1542. However, the Hebrew original did not appear until 1581 in Prague. Subsequently, however, the book was frequently printed in both languages. The author of the work is unknown, but Rabbi Moritz Güdemann (Gesch. iii. 223) advanced a very plausible hypothesis that it was Lipmann Mühlhausen.

== The book ==
Most of the book is not original writing; it closely follows the structure of The Improvement of the Moral Qualities by Solomon ibn Gabirol, a foundational work in ethical philosophy. It also draws directly from many of Maimonides's works. Additionally, it incorporates ideas from well-known ethical texts such as Sha'arei Teshuvah (שַׁעֲרֵי תְּשׁוּבָה, 'Gates [of] Repentance') by Rabbeinu Yona, which emphasizes repentance and purity of the soul, and Chovot HaLevavot (חוֹבוֹת הַלְּבָבוֹת, 'Duties [of] the Heart[s]'), a comprehensive guide to virtuous living that explores the nature of the soul, faith, and ethical behavior by Rabbi Bahya ibn Paquda.

Orchot Tzadikim, intended as a popular code of ethics, consists of a large volume of maxims:

- "It is evil pride to despise others, and to regard one's own opinion as the best, since such an attitude bars progress, while egotism increases bitterness toward others and decreases thine own capability of improvement" (1:24).
- "Be just and modest in association with others, and practice humility even toward the members of the household, toward the poor, and toward dependents. The more property thou hast, the greater should be thy humility, and thy honor and beneficence toward mankind" (2:6).
- "Be kind to thy non-Jewish servants; make not their burdens heavy, nor treat them scornfully with contemptuous words or blows" (8:9).
- "Forget not the good qualities thou lackest, and note thy faults; but forget the good that thou hast done, and the injuries thou hast received" (20:4).
- "Abash not him who hath a bodily blemish, or in whose family there is some stain. If one hath done evil and repented, name not his deed in his presence, even in jest, nor refer to a quarrel which has been ended, lest the dead embers be rekindled" (21:9).

In chapter 27, the author bitterly attacks the pilpul method of study, reproves his fellow Jews who engage in this method of Talmud study, and reproaches those who neglect the study of the Bible and sciences.

=== Authorship ===
According to Rabbi Gil Student, "[Orchot] Tzadikim is an anonymous [Musar] sefer that has enjoyed a lasting impact on Judaism. It is surprising that the sefer was never attributed to anyone... we can state with certainty is that the author lived in or after the early 14th century. Despite being influenced by the German Chasidim, he was a follower of the French Ba'alei Ha-Tosafot. We can suggest that the author lived in the late 14th century in France or among French exiles, but not in Germany or Spain".

There is speculation that the book was authored by a woman, owing to the author's heavy reliance on biblical rather than Talmudic sources and the decision to publish anonymously. However, publishing anonymously may merely indicate the author's very example of character development. Additionally, notwithstanding the author's frequent use of biblical sources, the author was clearly well-versed in Talmudic passages and, at one point, sharply criticizes the pilpul method of Talmud study, recommending a more traditional approach. There is, however, internal evidence that the author may have been thinking within the world of women at the time, as seen in the use of cooking metaphors.

== Jewish Encyclopedia bibliography ==
- Zunz, Z. G. p. 129;
- Benjacob, Oẓar ha-Sefarim, p. 51, No. 989;
- Güdemann, Gesch. iii. 223 et seq.;
- Winter and Wünsche, Die Jüdische Litteratur, iii. 639–641.
