= Tova Hartman =

Israeli academic

- טובה הרטמן
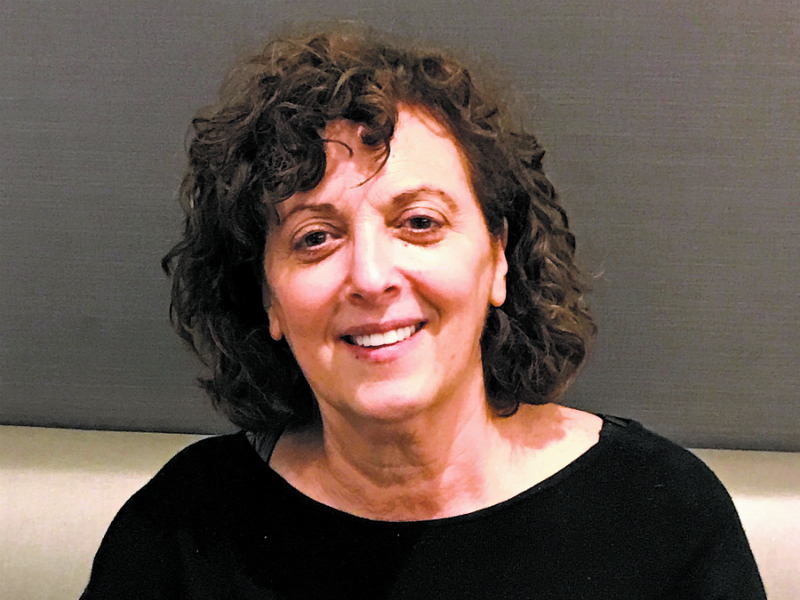
- Born: 1957 (age 68–69)
- Citizenship: Israeli
- Occupation: Professor of gender studies
- Writing career
- Language: Hebrew, English

Tova Hartman (Hebrew: טובה הרטמן; born 1957) is the Dean of Humanities at the Ono Academic College.

== Biography ==
Tova Hartman is the daughter of Rabbi Prof. David Hartman. She was married to Moshe Halbertal, and they have three daughters. She is a founder of Kehillat Shira Hadasha, a congregation organized to increase women's participation and leadership within traditional Jewish prayer and halakha.

== Academic career ==
Tova Hartman was a professor of Gender Studies and Education at Bar Ilan University, specializing in gender and religion, and gender and psychology.

== Literary career ==
She is the author of a book on Jewish and Catholic mothers, titled Appropriately Subversive, as well as a book on the crossroads of Jewish Tradition and modern feminism, titled Feminism Encounters Traditional Judaism, which won the National Jewish Book Award for Women's Studies in 2007. Hartman is the author of Are You Not a Man Of God? Devotion, Betrayal and Social Criticism in Jewish Tradition. Her book “Men with Broken Hearts” published in 2022, offers insight into the lives of men dealing with separation from their partners.

== Published works ==
- Appropriately Subversive: Modern Mothers in Traditional Religions, Harvard University Press, 2003, ISBN 0-674-00886-3
- Hartman, T. and Marmon, M., "Lived Regulations, Systemic Attributions Menstrual Separation and Ritual Immersion in the Experience of Orthodox Jewish Women." Gender & Society 18:3, pp. 389–408 (2004)

== See also ==
- Feminist Jewish ethics
- Hebrew University of Jerusalem
- Jewish feminism
- Jewish Orthodox Feminist Alliance
- Women in Judaism
- Donniel Hartman
