= Heidi Ravven =

American philosopher

- Born: Boston, Massachusetts
- Citizenship: United States of America
- Education: Brandeis University: Ph.D. (1984), M.A. (1974), and B.A. (1974)., Smith College: Attended from 1970 to 1971.
- Occupations: Writer, philosopher, professor

Heidi M. Ravven is the Bates and Benjamin Professor of Classical and Religious Studies at Hamilton College, where she has taught her specialization, Jewish Philosophy, and general Jewish Studies since 1983. She is a Fellow in Neurophilosophy of the Integrative Neurosciences Research Program, which is co-directed by Vilayanur Ramachandran and Kjell Fuxe. She has been appointed Visiting Professor of Philosophy in the School of Marxism at Northeast Normal University, Changchun, China, for 2017-20.

Professor Ravven holds a Ph.D. from Brandeis University (1984), attended Smith College, and is a 1970 graduate of the Commonwealth School, Boston. Ravven was a founding member of the Society for Empirical Ethics, an organization devoted to promoting dialogue among philosophers, neurobiologists, psychologists, anthropologists, and other social and natural scientists about ethics.

== Career ==
Ravven is a neurophilosopher and specialist on the philosophy of the seventeenth century philosopher, Baruch Spinoza. She was the first to argue that Spinoza's moral philosophy is a systems theory of ethics. Ravven was also the first philosopher to propose that Spinoza anticipated central discoveries in the neuroscience of the emotions. Ravven has published widely on Spinoza's philosophic thought, on the twelfth century philosopher Moses Maimonides, on G.W.F. Hegel and feminism, and on Jewish ethics and Jewish feminism.

She has been active in the Academy for Jewish Philosophy, the International Neuroethics Society, the North American Spinoza Society, and is a member of the American Philosophical Association, the Association for Jewish Studies, the International Academy of Law and Mental Health, and the Society for Jewish Ethics. Ravven is a past member of the Advisory Editorial Board of the Journal of Systemics, Cybernetics, and Informatics. She is responsible for advising and editorial activities in two areas: in Neurophilosophy and also in Ethics.

In 2004 Ravven received an unsolicited $500,000 grant from the Ford Foundation to write a book rethinking ethics. That book, The Self Beyond Itself: An Alternative History of Ethics, the New Brain Sciences, and the Myth of Free Will was published by The New Press in May, 2013. It is an extended and multidisciplinary inquiry into moral agency: why we are moral, why and when we are not, and how to get people to be more moral. Ravven concludes with her own theory of moral agency inspired by the philosophy of Spinoza, which she updates to reflect contemporary understandings of how the brain/mind works in moral thinking and action. The book is accessibly written for a generally educated audience rather than just for specialists.

== Writings ==
In The Self Beyond Itself: An Alternative History of Ethics, the New Brain Sciences, and the Myth of Free Will, Ravven challenges the idea of free will. Attributing free will to human beings means that human beings have the capacity to rise above both nature and nurture and even current situation to be good people and choose to act ethically. This capacity to choose our actions—to rise above our genetic inheritance whatever it might be, above our upbringing no matter how terrible it was, and above our present situation despite its social pressures—is what is meant by "free will." We do moral acts for moral reasons, for no other fully determining reasons, and out of no other fully determining causes—such as brain modules, group pressures, or upbringing. And that is why we can be held morally responsible. Ravven argues that this view is false and also that it is a cultural belief particular to the Western world. She traces the belief in free will to a theological myth and notion of human nature, and exposes the origins of the idea of free will in the Christian theology of the Latin West originating in the Church Father St. Augustine. She describes how that theology became secularized so that many today are unaware than free will presupposes a human person beyond nature and environment who can intervene as if from above (like an all-powerful God). "The Self Beyond Itself" was translated into Chinese under the direction of Professor Han Quihong of Northeast Normal University in Changchun, China, and published by the People's Publishing House in 2016.

Ravven turns to search the new brain sciences to discover new ways that moral agency could be rethought without free will. She concludes that there are three factors that together determine action: nature (biology, etc.), nurture (biography, history, culture, language, etc.), and present situation (social belonging and its demands, incentives, and disincentives, and the like). So the most effective way of changing individual behavior is to intervene in social and cultural and familial systems at every scale. Promoting and bolstering diversity and whistle blowing within all these systems is vital to combating the tendencies to Groupthink that human nature makes us all too prone to. For we are social and contextual beings—our brains have evolved that way. Nevertheless, as Spinoza anticipated, an arduous path of the education of desire can lead to independence of mind from the tyranny of the immediate local world for those who undertake it. We can learn to be good even if we cannot freely choose to be good.

Heidi Ravven has written extensively on the philosophy of Baruch Spinoza. Her articles appear in a number of journals and several have been republished in anthologies. Ravven believes that Spinoza's philosophy is the best starting point for trying to integrate the evidence emerging from the new brain sciences into a viable model of the basic moral brain, the optimal route to its development, and the implications of such a view for how social, legal, political, and other institutions and practices might to be redesigned. Ravven is now engaged in writing a book accessible to a generally educated audience on the relevance of Spinoza, called The Return of Spinoza.

== Bibliography ==
=== Books ===
- Jewish Themes in Spinoza's Philosophy (State University of New York Press 2002)
- The Self Beyond Itself: An Alternative History of Ethics, the New Brain Sciences, and the Myth of Free Will (The New Press, forthcoming 2013)

=== Selected articles ===
- Introduction to Benedict de Spinoza: 'Theological-Political Treatise.' New York: Barnes & Noble Books, 2009.
- "What Spinoza Can Teach Us About Embodying and Naturalizing Ethics." in Spinoza. Ed. Genevieve Lloyd, Moira Gatens, 2006.
- "What Can Spinoza Teach Us Today About Naturalizing Ethics? Provincializing Philosophical Ethics and Freedom without Free Will," in Cognitive, Emotive, and Ethical Aspects of Decision Making in Humans and in Artificial Intelligence 3. (2005)
- Introduction to Benedict de Spinoza: 'Ethics' and 'On the Improvement of the Understanding.' New York: Barnes & Noble Books, 2005.
- "Spinoza's Systems Theory of Ethics." in Cognitive, Emotive, and Ethical Aspects of Decision Making in Humans and in Artificial Intelligence 3. (2004)
- "Was Spinoza Right About Ethics? A Look at Recent Discoveries in the Neurobiology of the Emotions," in Studia Spinoza 14. (2004)
- "Spinoza's Ethic of the Liberation of Desire." in Women and Gender in Jewish Philosophy. Ed. Hava Tirosh-Samuelson, 2004.
- "Spinoza's anticipation of contemporary affective neuroscience," in Consciousness & Emotion 4. (2003)
- "Spinoza's individualism reconsidered: some lessons from the Short Treatise on God, Man, and His Well-Being" in Volume I CONTEXT, SOURCES, AND EARLY WRITINGS of Routledge Critical Assessments of Leading Philosophers: Spinoza, edited byGenevieve Lloyd, 2001
- "Some Thoughts on What Spinoza Learned from Maimonides about the Prophetic Imagination," The Journal of the History of Philosophy (two-part articleserialized in the April and July, 2001 issues: Volume XXIX, Numbers 3 & 4)
- "The Garden of Eden: Spinoza's Maimonidean Account of the Genealogy of Morals and the Origin of Society" in Philosophy and Theology, Volume 13, Number 1 (2001)
- "Has Hegel Anything to Say to Feminists?" in The International Libraryof Critical Essays in the History of Philosophy Series: Volume II HEGEL, David Lamb, ed. (Tom D. Campbell, General Editor of the Series), Aldershot, UK:Ashgate: International Publishing in the Social Sciences and Humanities,(1998).

== See also ==
- American philosophy
- List of American philosophers
