= Rachel Adler =

Jewish theologian, rabbi (born 1943)

- Born: Ruthelyn Rubin; July 20, 1943 (age 83); Chicago, Illinois, U.S.
- Education: University of Southern California
- Occupation: Professor (Emerita)
- Theological work
- Main interests: Jewish feminism

Rachel Adler (born Ruthelyn Rubin; July 2, 1943) is an American theologian who is Professor Emerita of Modern Jewish Thought and Judaism and Gender at Hebrew Union College, at the Los Angeles campus.

Adler was one of the first theologians to integrate feminist perspectives and concerns into Jewish texts and the renewal of Jewish law and ethics. Her approach to God is Levinasian and her approach to gender is constructivist.

== Life ==
Adler was born in Chicago on July 20, 1943, to Herman Rubin, an executive at a large insurance company, and Lorraine Rubin (née Helman), the chairwoman of a large guidance department at a suburban high school. In 1946, the Rubins had another daughter, Laurel. While Adler was raised Reform, she became Orthodox in her teens as a ba'al teshuva.

On December 20, 1964, while still studying at Northwestern University, Adler married Moshe Adler, an Orthodox rabbi. Adler went on to graduate with her B.A. and M.A. degrees in English Literature from Northwestern University in 1965 and 1966. Adler's early publications "The Jew Who Wasn't There: Halacha and the Jewish Woman," in Davka and "Tum'ah and Toharah: Ends and Beginnings" in 1971 and 1972, respectively, gained her international attention as a feminist spokesperson and Orthodox feminist. "Tum'ah and Tohara" appeared in the first volume of the influential Jewish Catalog series a "do-it-yourself kit" by Michael and Sharon Strassfeld and Richard Siegel, then members of Boston's Havurat Shalom.

Adler gave birth to a son, Amitai Bezalel, in 1973. During the 1970s, while active as an Orthodox Rebbetzin at the Los Angeles and Minnesota Hillel Houses, Adler completed all coursework for her doctorate in English. She went on to receive a Master of Social Work in 1980 and worked as a therapist for several years. In the 1980s, Adler's writings became increasingly critical of Niddah and classical rabbinics; she ultimately separated from the Orthodox movement and returned to Reform Judaism. In 1984, she divorced Moshe Adler.

In 1986, Adler enrolled in the Hebrew Union College – Jewish Institute of Religion-University of Southern California doctoral program in Religion. The next year, she married Los Angeles attorney David Schulman, who she divorced in 2008.

Shortly after her arrival in Los Angeles, Adler began a women's Talmud class in her home, teaching the text in its original Hebrew, with discussions in English. According to writer Maggie Anton, who joined the class in 1992, it was the first opportunity for lay women in Los Angeles to study Talmud together.

Adler completed her PhD degree in 1997 with her doctoral dissertation was titled "Justice and Peace Have Kissed: A Feminist Theology of Judaism." Following her graduation, she was appointed to the joint faculty of Religion at University of Southern California and Jewish Thought at HUC-JIR. In 2001, she decided to serve only on the HUC-JIR faculty.

In 2008, Adler chose to enter HUC-JIR's rabbinical institute. On May 13, 2012, she was ordained as a rabbi by the Reform seminary HUC-JIR in Los Angeles. In 2013, Adler became the first person to hold the Rabbi David Ellenson Chair in Jewish Religious Thought at Hebrew Union College.

In 2020, Adler retired, though she has continued to teach virtually as a Professor Emerita at HUC-JIR.

== Religious Perspectives ==
In 1971, while identifying as an Orthodox Jew (though she previously and later identified as Reform Jewish), she published an article entitled "The Jew Who Wasn't There: Halacha and the Jewish Woman," in Davka magazine; according to historian Paula Hyman, this article was a trailblazer in analyzing the status of Jewish women using feminism.

In 1972, she published an article entitled "Tum'ah and Toharah: Ends and Beginnings." In this article she argued that the ritual immersion of a niddah (a menstruating woman) in a mikveh did not "oppress or denigrate women." Instead, she argued, such immersion constituted a ritual reenactment of "death and resurrection" that was actually "equally accessible to men and women." However, she eventually renounced this position. In her essay "In Your Blood, Live: Re-visions of a Theology of Purity ", published in Tikkun in 1993, she wrote "purity and impurity do not constitute a cycle through which all members of society pass, as I argued in my [1972] essay. Instead, impurity and purity define a class system in which the most impure people are women."

In 1983, she published an essay in Moment entitled "I've Had Nothing Yet, So I Can't Take More," in which she criticized rabbinic tradition for making women "a focus of the sacred rather than active participants in its processes," and declared that being a Jewish woman "is very much like being Alice at the Hatter's tea party. We did not participate in making the rules, nor were we there at the beginning of the party."

In 1998, she published Engendering Judaism: An Inclusive Theology and Ethics for which she won the Tuttleman Foundation Book Award of Gratz College and was the first female theologian to be awarded the Jewish Book Council's National Jewish Book Award for Jewish Thought. Among the book's contributions to Jewish thoughts was the creation of a new ritual, brit ahuvim, to replace the traditional erusin marriage ceremony, which Adler viewed as not according with feminist ideals of equality between the sexes.

Adler is the author of many articles that have appeared in Blackwell's Companion to Feminist Philosophy, Beginning Anew: A Woman's Companion to the High Holy Days, Contemporary Jewish Religious Thought, Lifecycles, The Jewish Condition, and On Being a Jewish Feminist.

== Recognition ==
- 2023: IBPA Benjamin Franklin Award silver medal in religion for Holy Mysticat: Jewish Wisdom Stories by a Feline Mystic
- 2022: The 2022 art exhibit “Holy Sparks”, shown among other places at the Dr. Bernard Heller Museum, featured art about twenty-four female rabbis who were firsts in some way; Marilee Tolwin created the artwork about Adler that was in that exhibit.
- 2008: Jewish Book Award, best book of the year in any category, for The Torah: A Women's Commentary, for which Adler was on the editorial board and contributed “Contemporary Reflections” commentaries on Bereishit, Mishpatim, and Va’yakheil
- 2000: Tuttleman Foundation Book Award of Gratz College Engendering Judaism: An Inclusive Theology and Ethics
- 1999: National Jewish Book Award for Jewish Thought by the Jewish Book Council, Engendering Judaism: An Inclusive Theology and Ethics

== Publications ==
The following is an incomplete list of Adler's publications.

=== Books ===
- 1998: Engendering Judaism : An Inclusive Theology and Ethics. ISBN 0827605846
- 2020: Holy Mysticat: Jewish Wisdom Stories by a Feline Mystic ISBN 978-0976305019

=== Articles ===
- 1971: The Jew Who Wasn't There: Halacha and the Jewish Woman, Davka (republished in 1978 in Menachem Marc Kellner (ed.), Contemporary Jewish Ethics, pp. 347– 54. New York: Sanhedrin Press. ISBN 978-0884829218)
- 1972: Tum'ah and Toharah: Ends and Beginnings, The Jewish Catalogue
- 1974: Feminism, a Cause for the Halachic, Sh'ma: A Journal of Jewish Ideas
- 1974: Abortion -the Need to Change Jewish Law, Sh'ma: A Journal of Jewish Ideas
- 1976: Reprint of Tum'ah and Toharah: Ends and Beginnings in E. Koltun (ed.), The Jewish Woman: New Perspectives, pp. 63– 71. New York: Schocken., ISBN 978-0805236149
- 1983: I’ve Had Nothing Yet, So I Can't Take More, Moment
- 1985: A Letter to Fahtma, Sh'ma: A Journal of Jewish Ideas
- 1992: Talking Our Way In, Sh'ma: A Journal of Jewish Ideas
- 1993: In your blood, live: re-visions of a theology of purity, Tikkun
- 2004: "To Live Outside the Law, You Must Be Honest"- Boundaries, Borderlands and the Ethics of Cultural Negotiation, The Reconstructionist
- 2008: "Contemporary Reflections” commentaries on Bereishit, Mishpatim, and Va’yakheil in The Torah: A Women's Commentary ISBN 9780807410813
- 2013: Critiquing and Rethinking Kiddushin, AJS Perspectives: The Magazine of the Association for Jewish Studies
- 2013: An Extraordinary Light, Sh'ma: A Journal of Jewish Ideas

=== Liturgy ===
- 1982: Second Hymn to the Shekhinah, Response: A Contemporary Jewish Review
- 1985: Third Hymn to the Shekhina, Response: A Contemporary Jewish Review

== See also ==
- Jewish feminism
- Reform Judaism
- Role of women in Judaism
