= Tamar Ross =

Israeli philosopher

Tamar Ross (Hebrew: תמר רוס) is a professor of Jewish philosophy at Bar-Ilan University and a specialist in religious feminist philosophy.

== Work ==
Ross addresses philosophical questions about gender in Judaism by arguing that feminism is not external to Torah but rather integral to it. She argues for the concept of evolving revelation, that is, that people learn more as history evolves and societies develop and mature, and argues against the concept of Yeridat ha-dorot, the idea that knowledge of Torah diminishes with time. She also argues against approaches of more liberal movements which address perceived flaws by challenging the divinity and religious validity of sacred texts and traditions, arguing that such an approach only undermined the foundations faith. She develops the metaphor of "Expanding the Palace of Torah", originally an idea of Abraham Isaac Kook, for an approach seeking to address contemporary concerns by expanding rather than undermining religious tradition.

Her areas of expertise include the thought of Abraham Isaac Kook, the modern Musar movement and the ideology of Mitnaggedism, and Judaism and gender. She is the author of books and articles on Jewish ethics and theology, contemporary issues in traditional Jewish thought, philosophy of halakha, and Orthodox Jewish feminism.

Ross is on the Advisory Council of the Jewish Orthodox Feminist Alliance (JOFA).

Ross has published widely on many topics relating to Jewish thought and the philosophy of halakha and was selected by the Israeli government as torchbearer in the Independence Day ceremony of 2013 for her contribution to women's learning.

Ross attended JOFA's conferences over the years.

== Selected works ==
- "The Cognitive Value of Religious Truth Claims: Rabbi A.I. Kook and Postmodernism", in Hazon Nahum: Jubilee Volume in Honor of Norman Lamm, December 1997, pp. 479–527.
- "Modern Orthodoxy and the Challenge of Feminism", in Studies in Contemporary Jewry, edited by Jonathan Frankel, Eli Lederhendler, Peter Y. Medding and Ezra Mendelsohn. Institute of Contemporary Jewry and Oxford University Press, 2000, pp, 3-38
- "Orthodoxy, Women, and Halakhic Change" (Hebrew), in The Quest for Halakha: Interdisciplinary Perspectives on Jewish Law, edited by Amichai Berholz. Yediot Aharonot/Bet Morasha, 2003, pp. 387–438.
- Expanding the Palace of Torah: Orthodoxy and Feminism. Brandeis University Press, 2004. ISBN 1-58465-390-6

== See also ==
- Jewish feminism
- Jewish Orthodox Feminist Alliance
- Role of women in Judaism
