= Jewish views on lying =

Religious doctrine in Judaism

In Jewish tradition, lying is generally forbidden but is required in certain exceptional cases, such as to save a life.

== Hebrew Bible ==
The Tanakh (Hebrew Bible) forbids perjury in at least three verses: "You shall not bear false witness against your neighbor" (Exodus 20:12, part of the Ten Commandments), also phrased "Neither shall you bear false witness against your neighbor" (Deuteronomy 5, see Deut 5:16), and another verse "Keep yourself far from a false matter; and the innocent and righteous do not kill; for I will not justify the wicked" (Exodus 23, see Ex 23:7). According to Deuteronomy 19 (see Deut 19:16–21), false witnesses should receive the same punishment that they sought to mete out on the unjustly accused. A similar prohibition, "You shall not steal; neither shall you deal falsely, nor lie one to another" (Leviticus 19, see Lev 19:11) relates to business dealings. There are also passages which condemn lying in general: "He that does deceit shall not dwell within My house; he that speaks false-hood shall not be established before My eyes" (Psalm 101:7), "There are six things which the Lord hates, indeed, seven which are an abomination unto Him: Haughty eyes, a lying tongue, and hands that shed innocent blood" (Proverbs 6, see Prov 6:16–17, 19) and "Lying lips are an abomination to the Lord; but they who deal truly are His delight" (Proverbs 12, see Prov 12:22), "The remnant of Israel shall not do iniquity, nor speak lies, neither shall a deceitful tongue be found in their mouth" (Zephaniah 3, see Zeph 3:13), "And if any prophets appear again, their fathers and mothers who bore them will say to them, “You shall not live, for you speak lies in the name of the Lord”; and their fathers and their mothers who bore them shall pierce them through when they prophesy." (Zechariah 13, see Zech 13:3) "They have taught their tongue to speak lies, they weary themselves to commit iniquity" (Jeremiah 9, see Jer 9:5).

However, in various biblical stories, those who lie and mislead are not necessarily condemned, and in some cases are praised. Biblical figures that engaged in deception include Abraham, Isaac, Simeon, and Levi. The Torah does not prohibit lying if no one is harmed.

== Talmud ==
The Talmud forbids lying or deceiving others: "The Holy One, blessed be He, hates a person which says one thing with his mouth and another in his heart" (Pesahim 113b) and also forbids fraud in business dealings: "As there is wronging in buying and selling, there is wronging with words. A man must not ask: ‘How much is this thing?” if he has no intention of buying it" (Bava Metzia 4:10).

Bava Metzia 23b-24a lists three exceptions where lying is permitted:

1. It is permissible for a scholar to state he is unfamiliar with part of the Talmud, even if he is familiar (out of humility)
2. It is permissible to lie in response to intimate questions regarding one's marital life (as such things should be kept private)
3. Lying about hospitality received (to protect the host)

Yevamot 65b states that "It is permitted to stray from the truth in order to promote peace", and Rabbi Natan further argues that this is obligatory.

== Later views ==
Due to the principle of saving a life, in Jewish law it is required to lie to save a life, such as withholding a diagnosis from a seriously ill patient or concealing one's Jewish faith in a time of persecution of Jews. It may also be required to lie in other cases where a positive commandment would be violated by telling the truth, as positive commandments in Judaism usually take precedence against negative ones. Even in the cases where lying is acceptable, it is preferable to tell a technically true but deceptive statement or employ half-truth. It is also completely forbidden to lie habitually, to lie to a child (which would teach them that it was acceptable), and to lie in the court system.

Rabbi Eliyahu Dessler redefined "truth" to mean any statement which serves God and "falsehood" to mean any statement that harms God's interests. This would radically change Jewish views on lying.

According to Conservative rabbi Louis Jacobs, "the main thrust in the appeals for Jews to be truthful is in the direction of moral truth and integrity" although there is also "great significance to intellectual honesty". Reconstructionist rabbi Fred Scherlinder Dobb stated in an interview, "There is no justification whatsoever in Jewish tradition for lies which are either sloppy, systemic or self-serving... every word we utter should reflect our values, and one of the highest of those values is truth."

== Sources ==
- Freund, Richard A. (1991). "Lying and deception in the Biblical and post-Biblical Judaic tradition". Scandinavian Journal of the Old Testament. 5 (1): 45–61. doi:10.1080/09018329108584958.
- Mathewes, Charles (2010). "Lying—Judaism". Understanding Religious Ethics. John Wiley & Sons. pp. 124–126. ISBN 978-1-4051-3351-7.
- Resnicoff, Steven H. (2002). "Lying and Lawyering: Contrasting American and Jewish Law". Notre Dame Law Review. 77: 937–976.
- Trevino, Marcella Bush (2014). "Judaism". In Levine, Timothy R. (ed.). Encyclopedia of Deception. SAGE Publications. pp. 563–566. ISBN 978-1-4833-8898-4.
- Weiss, Shira (2017). "The Ethics of Deception in Biblical Narrative". Journal of Jewish Ethics. 3 (1): 1–27. doi:10.5325/jjewiethi.3.1.0001.
