= Laurie Zoloth =

American ethicist (born 1950)

Academic work
- Discipline: Ethics
- Institutions: University of Chicago

Laurie Zoloth (born 1950) is an American ethicist, currently Margaret E. Burton Professor at the University of Chicago Divinity School. From 2017 to 2018, she served as the Dean of the Divinity School and as such was the first Jewish dean of the Divinity School.

Zoloth has been both the president of the American Academy of Religion and the American Society for Bioethics and Humanities. She is an elected member of The Hastings Center and a life member of Clare Hall, Cambridge. She is a founding board member of the Society for Scriptural Reasoning.

== Career ==
Zoloth began her career as a neonatal nurse working in impoverished communities. She has a bachelor's degree in women's studies from UC Berkeley and a second bachelor’s in science (nursing) from the University of the State of New York, now Regent’s College. From 2000 to 2003 she was Professor of Social Ethics and Jewish Philosophy at San Francisco State University, from which she holds a master's degree in English. She received a second master’s degree in Jewish Studies, and a Ph.D in Social Ethics from the Graduate Theological Union, graduating in 1993, and holds a Health Care Ethics Consultant Certificate (HEC-C, 2024) From 2003 to 2017 she was a Professor of Medical Humanities and Bioethics in the Feinberg School of Medicine and Professor of Religious Studies in the Weinberg College of Arts and Sciences at Northwestern University. Since 2005 she has been an Affiliated Professor at the University of Haifa. She was appointed the Dean of the University of Chicago Divinity School in July 2017, making her the first Jew to become the dean of a divinity school based at an American university.

As dean at the Divinity School, she tried to get the operators of the coffee shop, Grounds of Being, to pay rent. She served as dean for less than a year.

Laurie Zoloth writes in the fields of religious studies and bioethics, with a focus on ethics of genetic engineering, stem cell research, synthetic biology, and social justice in health care. She is the author of Health Care and the Ethics of Encounter: A Jewish Discussion of Social Justice (University of North Carolina Press, 1999); “Second Texts and Second Opinions: Essays Toward a Jewish Bioethics” (Oxford University Press, 2022); “Ethics for the Coming Storm: Climate Change and Jewish Thought” (Oxford University Press, 2023); “May We Make the World: Gene Drives, Malaria, and the Future of Nature” (MIT Press, 2023)and editor (with Dena Davis) of Notes from a Narrow Ridge: Religion and Bioethics (University Publishing Group, 1999); “The Human Embryonic Stem Cell Debate”, (with Karen LeBacqz and Suzanne Holland) (MIT 2001); “Margin of Error: Mistakes in Medicine and Bioethics” (with Susan Rubin) (University Press Publishing Group, 2003); Oncofertility: Ethical, Legal, Social and Medical Perspectives,(with Teresa Woodruff) (Springer, 2010; and (with Elliot Dorff) Jews and Genes: The Genetic Future in Contemporary Jewish Thought (Jewish Publication Society, 2015).

She was co-founder of The Ethics Practice, a group that has provided bioethics consultation and education services to health care providers and health care systems nationally. She was the chair of the Howard Hughes Medical Institute National Bioethics Advisory Board for seven years. She served on the NASA National Advisory Board, which is the agency’s highest civilian committee; the NASA IACUC, NASA's Interagency National Animal Care and Use Committees, the NASA International Planetary Advisory Board, and currently serves on the NASA Ethics Committee. She was on the first national advisory board of the American Association for the Advancement of Science’s Dialogue on Science, Ethics and Religion and was a member of both the American Heart Association’s Ethics Board and the AACOG National Ethics Board. She was on the founding board of the International Society for Stem Cell Research, serving as the first chair of its ethics committee, and on the founding board of the American Society for Bioethics and Humanities (ASBH.) She was a member of the CDC’s Working Group on Emerging Biological Agents and served on several NIH Data Safety and Monitoring Committees. She served on the NIH’s Recombinant DNA Advisory Committee (the National RAC) for six years. A fellow of the Hastings Center for Bioethics, she was elected to the Council in 2025.

Her work has received numerous awards for teaching and for research, including an honorary doctorate from American Jewish University; the Englehardt Award in Bioethics, the 2024 Borsch- Rast Book Prize, and the Choice Award from the National Library Association.
