= Thou shalt not bear false witness against thy neighbour =

One of the Ten Commandments

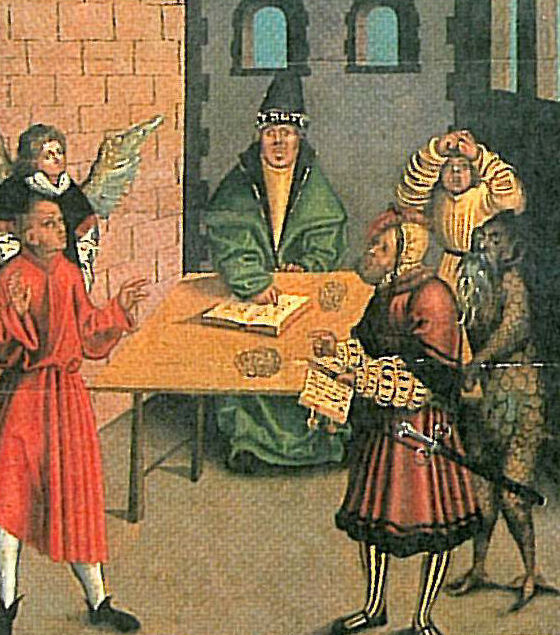
You shall not bear false witness against your neighbour, Lucas Cranach the elder

"Thou shalt not bear false witness against thy neighbor" (Biblical Hebrew: לֹא תַעֲנֶה בְרֵעֲךָ עֵד שָׁקֶר, romanized: Lōʾ ṯaʿăne ḇərēʿăḵā ʿēḏ šāqer) (Exodus 20:16) is one of the Ten Commandments, widely understood as moral imperatives in Judaism and Christianity.

The Book of Exodus describes the Ten Commandments as being spoken by God, inscribed on two stone tablets by the finger of God, broken by Moses, and rewritten by Yahweh on a replacement set of stones hewn by Moses.

The command against false testimony is seen as a natural consequence of the command to "love your neighbour as yourself". This moral prescription flows from the command for holy people to bear witness to their deity. Offenses against the truth express by word or deed a refusal to commit oneself to moral uprightness: they are fundamental infidelities to God and, in this sense, they undermine the foundations of covenant with God.

== Ancient understanding ==
You shall not spread a false report. You shall not join hands with a wicked man to be a malicious witness. You shall not fall in with the many to do evil, nor shall you bear witness in a lawsuit, siding with the many, so as to pervert justice, nor shall you be partial to a poor man in his lawsuit.

— Exodus 23:1-3

The Hebrew Bible contains a number of prohibitions against false witness, lying, spreading false reports, etc. For a person who had a charge brought against them and were brought before a religious prosecution, the charge was considered as established only on the evidence of two or three sworn witnesses. In cases where false testimony was suspected, the religious judges were to make a thorough investigation, and if false testimony were proven, the false witness was to receive the punishment he had intended to bring on the person falsely accused. For example, since murder was a capital crime, giving false testimony in a murder case was subject to the death penalty. Those eager to receive or listen to false testimony were also subject to punishment.

False witness is among the six things God hates, king Solomon says. False testimony is among the things that defile a person, Jesus says.

The witness who hid what he had seen or what he knew bore his iniquity; if he realized his guilt, he had to confess his sin, brought to the Lord a female lamb or goat from the flock (or two turtledoves or two pigeons, or a tenth of an ephah of fine flour) for a sin offering as his compensation for the sin he committed.

The lying witness is a deceitful man, who mocks at justice. He is like a war club, or a sword, or a sharp arrow. ″A false witness will not go unpunished.″ King Solomon says. ″A false witness will perish″ if he does not repent.

The narrative in 1 Kings 21 describes a case of false testimony. King Ahab of Israel tried to convince Naboth the Jezreelite to sell him the vineyard Naboth owned adjacent to the king's palace. Ahab wanted the land to use as a vegetable garden, but Naboth refused to sell or trade the property to Ahab saying, "The LORD forbid that I should give up to you what I have inherited from my fathers!" Ahab's wife Jezebel then conspired to obtain the vineyard by writing letters in Ahab's name to the elders and nobles in Naboth's town instructing them to have two scoundrels bear false witness claiming that Naboth has cursed both God and the king. After Naboth was subsequently stoned to death, Ahab seized possession of Naboth's vineyard. The text describes the LORD as very angry with Ahab, and the prophet Elijah pronounces judgment on both Ahab and Jezebel.

The narrative in 2 Samuel 1 also contains a narrative which is often interpreted as false testimony. The 1 Samuel narrative had described Saul as killing himself by falling on his own sword after having been wounded by the Philistines on Mount Gilboa and being in a situation with no hope of victory or escape. However, 2 Samuel tells of an Amalekite, who was probably on Mount Gilboa to strip the dead of their possessions, appearing to David with Saul's crown and royal arm band and giving testimony that he had himself killed king Saul. David immediately ordered that the Amalekite be put to death, saying, "Your blood be on your head, for your own mouth has testified against you, saying, 'I have killed the LORD's anointed.'" The truth of the Amalekite's testimony did not need to be determined for the sentence to be carried out: either the Amalekite had killed King Saul, or he had given false testimony to David regarding Saul's death. Both crimes were seen as equally deserving of the death penalty.

The ancient understanding of false testimony not only includes testifying with false words, but also failing to come forward with relevant testimony in response to a public charge. "If a person sins because he does not speak up when he hears a public charge to testify regarding something he has seen or learned about, he will be held responsible."

== Jewish doctrine ==
Jewish law enumerates 613 Mitzvot or commandments, including several commandments related to honest testimony as related to judicial procedure.

570. Anybody who knows evidence must testify in court (Leviticus 5:1)
571. Carefully interrogate the witness (Deuteronomy 13:15)
572. A witness must not serve as a judge in capital crimes (Deuteronomy 19:17)
573. Not to accept testimony from a lone witness (Deuteronomy 19:15)
574. Transgressors must not testify (Exodus 23:1)
575. Relatives of the litigants must not testify (Deuteronomy 24:16)
576. Not to testify falsely (Exodus 20:16)
577. Punish the false witnesses as they tried to punish the defendant (Deuteronomy 19:19)

— Sefer Hamitzvot by Maimonides

Maimonides (the Rambam) further explained that if false testimony was calculated to occasion a monetary loss, the court should inflict a monetary loss of equal value on the false witness. Likewise, if the false testimony was calculated to result in death, the false witness is to suffer the same kind of death. In Sefer Hachinuch, one who fails to testify when one is aware of evidence is compared to one who stands idly by the blood of one's neighbor. The severity of breaking the ninth commandment is reflected in a midrash:

One who bears false witness against one's neighbor commits as serious a sin as if one had borne false witness against God, saying that God did not create the world.

— Mechilta to Exodus 20:13

== New Testament doctrine ==
According to the New Testament, Jesus explains that obedience to the prohibition against false testimony from the ten commandments is a requirement for eternal life. According to Jesus, false testimony comes from the sinful desires of the heart and makes people unclean.

The New Testament narrative also describes several occasions where people testify falsely against Jesus and his disciples. When Jesus was on trial before the Sanhedrin, the chief priests were looking for evidence to justify putting Jesus to death, and the narrative in Matthew's Gospel states that many false witnesses (Greek: πολλων ψευδομαρτυρων) came forward. Jesus remained silent until the high priest charged him under oath to answer whether Jesus is "the Christ, the Son of God". Jesus answered affirmatively.

The Acts of the Apostles describes the disciple Stephen being seized and brought before the Sanhedrin. Those who opposed Stephen persuaded false witnesses to testify that Stephen was guilty of blasphemy against Moses and against God. Stephen used the occasion of his trial to remind the Sanhedrin of the Old Testament testimony of rebellion, idolatry, and persecution of the prophets that culminated in the murder of Jesus. The crowd was so angry that Stephen was stoned to death.

The New Testament depicts the Apostles as being appointed as true witnesses to the ministry and resurrection of Jesus Christ. The Apostle Paul uses the Old Testament prohibition of false testimony to describe his fear of God if found to be a false witness about God regarding the resurrection.

But if it is preached that Christ has been raised from the dead, how can some of you say that there is no resurrection of the dead? If there is no resurrection of the dead, then not even Christ has been raised. And if Christ has not been raised, our preaching is useless and so is your faith. More than that, we are then found to be false witnesses about God, for we have testified about God that he raised Christ from the dead. But he did not raise him if in fact the dead are not raised. For if the dead are not raised, then Christ has not been raised either. And if Christ has not been raised, your faith is futile; you are still in your sins.

— The Apostle Paul

In Romans 13:9, Paul lists a number of the ten commandments which can be summed up in the saying "You shall love your neighbor as yourself". The Textus Receptus and the King James Bible include "You shall not bear false witness", but this commandment is missing from some early manuscripts containing Romans 13 and the Cambridge Bible for Schools and Colleges suggests that it is "perhaps to be omitted, on documentary evidence".

Some of those who belonged to the synagogue of the Freedmen and of the Cyrenians, and of the Alexandrians, and of those from Cilicia and Asia came upon Stephen and seized him and brought him before the council and set up false witnesses against him. These false witnesses said: "This man never ceases to speak words against this holy place (Temple of Jerusalem) and the law, for we have heard him say that this Jesus of Nazareth will destroy this place (Stephen said that the temple of Jesus′ body had been destroyed by others but raise it up by Him in three days, according with what Jesus had said) and the customs that Moses delivered to us."(Stephen said what Jesus had said namely He had come to fulfil the Law of Moses and the Prophets) And gazing at him, all who sat in the council saw Stephen′ s face was like the face of an angel.

Many testified falsely against Jesus, but their statements did not agree. At last two witnesses said they had heard Him saying He would destroy that temple and in three days built another, not made with hands, (He really had meant the resurrection of His body, as a temple of the Holy Spirit, destroyed by others but raise it up by Him). Yet even about this their testimony did not agree.

== Eastern Orthodox view ==
The Eastern Orthodox Christian is expected to uphold truth, at all times and in all places, without exception. Slander and gossip are equally evil, and the initial speaker is responsible for any further damage caused as the report is spread. Unless there is a compelling reason to speak ill of someone, as is the case of protect oneself or others against harm, it is not permissible even if the account be true. Saint Dorotheus of Gaza said, "You may well know about the sin, but you do not know about the repentance."

== Roman Catholic doctrine ==
The Roman Catholic Church interprets the command against "false witness" more broadly than the Jewish historical context of perjury, and considers it as a broad prohibition against misrepresenting the truth in one's relation with others. This commandment enjoins truthfulness and respect for other's good name, even the dead. It prohibits detraction (true faults), calumny (false faults), gossip, rash judgment, lying, and the violation of secrets.

The Catechism of the Catholic Church (§2469) states, "...The virtue of truth gives another his just due. Truthfulness keeps to the just mean between what ought to be expressed and what ought to be kept secret: it entails honesty and discretion. In justice, "as a matter of honor, one man owes it to another to manifest the truth."

Catholic teaching describes truth as uprightness in human action and speech and is the virtue which consists of showing oneself true in deeds and truthful in words, and in guarding against duplicity, dissimulation, and hypocrisy. The person of truth gives another his just due. Truthfulness balances what ought to be expressed and what ought to be kept secret: it entails both honesty and discretion. In justice, one man owes it to another to manifest the truth. The disciple of Christ consents to "live in the truth," that is, in the simplicity of a life in conformity with the Lord's example, abiding in his truth. "If we say we have fellowship with him while we walk in darkness, we lie and do not live according to the truth."(1 John 1:6)

To keep "a clear conscience toward God and toward men"(Acts 24:16), Christians must follow Christ's example "to bear witness to the truth."(John 18:37) The Christian is not to "be ashamed then of testifying to our Lord."(2 Timothy 1:8) In situations that require witness to the faith, the Christian must profess it without equivocation. Christian witness to the Gospel and the obligations that flow from it are an act of justice that establishes the truth or makes it known. Catholic teaching regards martyrdom as the supreme witness given to the truth of the faith: it means bearing witness even unto death. Christ's disciples have "put on the new man, created after the likeness of God in true righteousness and holiness."(Ephesians 4:24) By "putting away falsehood," they are to "put away all malice and all guile and insincerity and envy and all slander." (Ephesians 4:25, 1 Peter 2:1) Public statements contrary to the truth take on a particular gravity. In court it becomes false witness. (Proverbs 19:9) False statements under oath are perjury. Acts such as these contribute to condemnation of the innocent, exoneration of the guilty, or the increased punishment of the accused. (Proverbs 18:5) These are great sins, because they gravely compromise the exercise of justice and the fairness of judicial decisions.

Respect for the reputation of persons forbids every attitude and word likely to cause unjust injury. One is guilty of rash judgment who assumes the moral fault of a neighbor without sufficient foundation. One is guilty of detraction who discloses another's faults and failings to persons who did not know them without objectively valid reason. One is guilty of calumny (a misrepresentation intended to harm another's reputation) who harms the reputation of others and gives occasion for false judgments concerning them by remarks contrary to the truth. These sins violate both the commandment against false witness, as well as the command to love one's neighbor as oneself.

Not only are gossip and slander held to be covered by the commandment against false witness, Catholic teaching also holds that "every word or attitude is forbidden which by flattery, adulation, or complaisance encourages and confirms another in malicious acts and perverse conduct. Adulation is a grave fault if it makes one an accomplice in another's vices or grave sins. Neither the desire to be of service nor friendship justifies duplicitous speech." Furthermore, boasting and bragging are viewed as offenses against truth. So is irony aimed at disparaging someone by maliciously caricaturing (mocking) some aspect of his behavior.

The Catholic Church teaches that "A lie consists in speaking a falsehood with the intention of deceiving." According to the Bible, the Lord denounces lying as the work of the devil: "You are of your father the devil, . . . there is no truth in him. When he lies, he speaks according to his own nature, for he is a liar and the father of lies." (John 8:44) Lying is the most direct offense against the truth. To lie is to speak or act against the truth in order to lead someone into error. By injuring man's relation to truth and to his neighbor, a lie offends against the fundamental relation of man and of his word to the Lord. Lying is a mortal sin when it does grave injury to the virtues of justice and charity. Lying is a profanation of speech, whereas the purpose of speech is to communicate known truth to others. The deliberate intention of leading a neighbor into error by saying things contrary to the truth constitutes a failure in justice and charity. The culpability is greater when the intention of deceiving entails the risk of deadly consequences for those who are led astray. By violating the virtue of truthfulness, a lie does real violence to another. It affects his ability to know, which is a condition of every judgment and decision. It contains the seed of discord and all consequent evils. Lying is destructive of society; it undermines trust among men and tears apart the fabric of social relationships.

However, the right to the communication of the truth is not unconditional in Catholic teaching. Everyone must conform his life to the Gospel precept of fraternal love. In concrete situations one should judge whether it is appropriate to reveal the truth to someone who asks for it. Charity and respect for the truth should dictate the response to every request for information or communication. The good and safety of others, respect for privacy, and the common good are sufficient reasons for being silent about what ought not be known or for making use of a discreet language. The duty to avoid scandal often commands strict discretion. No one is bound to reveal the truth to someone who does not have the right to know it. The golden rule helps one discern, in concrete situations, whether it would be appropriate to reveal the truth to someone who asks for it. The sacrament of confession is inviolable.

== Lutheran doctrine ==
Martin Luther explained that this commandment is given "first of all that every one shall help his neighbor to secure his rights, and not allow them to be hindered or twisted, but shall promote and strictly maintain them, no matter whether he be judge or witness." Luther also asserted that this command extends to the spiritual jurisdiction and prohibited slander against preachers and Christians by calling them heretics, apostates, seditious, wicked, etc. Thirdly, he described the commandment against false witness to prohibit the public judgment and reproof of his neighbor. One can indeed see and hear the neighbor sin, but one has no command to report it to others. If one judges and passes sentence, one falls into a sin which is greater than his (except for judges, parents, and preachers.)

Over and above our own body, spouse, and temporal possessions, we have yet another treasure, namely, honor and good report [the illustrious testimony of an upright and unsullied name and reputation], with which we cannot dispense. For it is intolerable to live among men in open shame and general contempt. Therefore God wishes the reputation, good name, and upright character of our neighbor to be taken away or diminished as little as his money and possessions, that every one may stand in his integrity before wife, children, servants, and neighbors. And in the first place, we take the plainest meaning of this commandment according to the words (Thou shalt not bear false witness), as pertaining to the public courts of justice, where a poor innocent man is accused and oppressed by false witnesses in order to be punished in his body, property, or honor.

— Martin Luther, The Large Catechism

Slanderers are not content with knowing a thing, but "proceed to assume jurisdiction, and when they know a slight offense of another, carry it into every corner, and are delighted and tickled that they can stir up another's displeasure [baseness], as swine roll themselves in the dirt and root in it with the snout." Luther describes this as meddling with the judgment and office of God, and pronouncing sentence and punishment with the most severe verdict. Without wielding the sword, the slanderer employs a poisonous tongue to the shame and hurt of your neighbor.

God therefore would have it prohibited that any one speak evil of another even though he be guilty, and the latter know it right well; much less if he do not know it, and have it only from hearsay. But you say: Shall I not say it if it be the truth? Answer: Why do you not make accusation to regular judges? Ah, I cannot prove it publicly, and hence I might be silenced and turned away in a harsh manner [incur the penalty of a false accusation]. "Ah, indeed, do you smell the roast?" If you do not trust yourself to stand before the proper authorities and to make answer, then hold your tongue. But if you know it, know it for yourself and not for another. For if you tell it to others, although it be true, you will appear as a liar, because you cannot prove it, and you are, besides acting like a knave. For we ought never to deprive any one of his honor or good name unless it be first taken away from him publicly.

— Martin Luther, The Large Catechism

== Reformed doctrine ==
John Calvin taught that the commandment against false witness prohibits all calumnies (gossip and slander) and false accusations which might injure our neighbor's good name, and any falsehood which might impair his fortune. Christians must assert only the truth with pure motives for the maintenance of our neighbor's good name and estate.

By malignant or vicious detraction, we sin against our neighbor's good name: by lying, sometimes even by casting a slur upon him, we injure him in his estate. It makes no difference whether you suppose that formal and judicial testimony is here intended, or the ordinary testimony which is given in private conversation. For we must always recur to the consideration, that for each kind of transgression one species is set forth by way of example, that to it the others may be referred, and that the species chiefly selected, is that in which the turpitude of the transgression is most apparent.

— John Calvin

Calvin asserted that God's intent in the prohibition of false witness extended "more generally to calumny and sinister insinuations by which our neighbors are unjustly aggrieved." Since perjury in court is amply prohibited by the third commandment (against swearing falsely), the commandment against false witness must extend to protection of one's good name. "The equity of this is perfectly clear. For if a good name is more precious than riches, a man, in being robbed of his good name, is no less injured than if he were robbed of his goods; while, in the latter case, false testimony is sometimes not less injurious than rapine committed by the hand."

Nay, the commandment extends so far as to include that scurrilous affected urbanity, instinct with invective, by which the failings of others, under an appearance of sportiveness, are bitterly assailed, as some are wont to do, who court the praise of wit, though it should call forth a blush, or inflict a bitter pang. By petulance of this description, our brethren are sometimes grievously wounded. But if we turn our eye to the Lawgiver, whose just authority extends over the ears and the mind, as well as the tongue, we cannot fail to perceive that eagerness to listen to slander, and an unbecoming proneness to censorious judgements are here forbidden.

— John Calvin

Matthew Henry taught that the prohibition against false witness concerns our own and our neighbor's good name. "Thou shalt not bear false witness" forbids: "1. Speaking falsely in any matter, lying, equivocating, and any way devising and designing to deceive our neighbour. 2. Speaking unjustly against our neighbour, to the prejudice of his reputation; and (which involves the guilty of both). 3. Bearing false witness against him, laying to his charge things that he knows not, either judicially, upon oath (by which the third commandment, and the sixth and eighth, as well as this, are broken), or extrajudicially, in common converse, slandering, backbiting, tale-bearing, aggravating what is done amiss and making it worse than it is, and any way endeavouring to raise our own reputation upon the ruin of our neighbour's."

== Irvingian doctrine ==
The New Apostolic Church, the largest of the Irvingian Churches, teaches:

All false witness is a lie. In a broader sense, the Eighth Commandment can be understood as a prohibition against any dishonest conduct (Leviticus 19: 11). Due to the imperfection inherent in human beings, no one will succeed in speaking nothing but the truth. However, the more diligently a person follows Christ, the more he will speak and act in a truthful manner. Apostle Paul advises: "Therefore, putting away lying, 'Let each one of you speak truth with his neighbour'" (Ephesians 4: 25). To speak truth with one's neighbour does not, however, imply that everyone in every case may or should reproach his fellow man with unpleasant truths. Much evil could result if someone were to relentlessly denounce all the mistakes made in his surroundings. Even the Eighth Commandment is subordinate to the principle of loving one's neighbour. Great care should therefore be taken in speaking to–and about–others. Accordingly, Proverbs 6: 19 states that "a false witness who speaks lies" is an abomination to God. This is also true for "one who sows discord among brethren".
