= Jewish business ethics =

Jewish business ethics is a form of applied Jewish ethics that examines ethical issues that arise in a business environment. It is noted that in the Torah, there are over 100 Mitzvot concerning the kashrut (fitness) of one's money, many more, in fact, than concerning the kashrut of food. The subject thus receives an extensive treatment in Rabbinic literature, both from an ethical (Mussar) and a legal (Halakha) point of view.

== Ethical perspective ==
The general gravity with which business ethics are treated in Jewish thought is illustrated by the widely quoted Talmudic tradition (Shabbat 31a) that in one's judgement in the next world the first question asked is: "were you honest in business?" Similarly, the punishment to be received for dishonest business practice is held to be more severe than for other categories of sin.

In the Book of Sirach, verses 26:29-27:3 offer a "remarkably sceptical" view of business:

As a stake is driven firmly into a fissure between stones, so sin is wedged in between selling and buying.

In addition to these, and numerous other Talmudic passages, the Mussar and Chassidic literature also discuss business ethics at great length. Examples follow by genre.

- Aggadic and Midrashic discussions relating to honesty in business include the following. Yoma 86:B is an often cited example, where this obligation is examined in the context of profanation of God's Name (Leviticus 22:32.) and of the Love of God (Deuteronomy 6:5.). To position the question, a Talmudic dictum (Bava Kamma 30a) states: "He who wishes to achieve saintliness should study the [mishnaic] order of Nezikin." Avot de-Rabbi Natan teaches that "character is tested through business."
- The major Mishnaic principle of Torah im Derech Eretz - which underpins much Hashkafah and Jewish thought - requires that one earns one's living through productive labor, while also warning against materialism; see section #Earning a livelihood there. Kiddushin 4:14 discusses a general approach to work, and the requirement that one's profession be "clean", i.e. without prospect for dishonesty.
- Talmudic teachings define as fraud - every mode of taking advantage of a man's ignorance, whether Jew or Gentile; as theft - gains obtained by betting or gambling, or by raising the price of food through speculation; as usury - advantages derived from loans of money or of other items; as a sin provoking God's punishment - every breach of promise in commerce; as a culpable transgression - every act of carelessness which exposes men or things to danger or damage.
- The Mesillat Yesharim, considered a foundational Mussar text, devotes much discussion to honesty in business, and the role this plays as regards character development in general; see for example Ch 11. Rabbi Yisrael Lipkin Salanter (19th century), founder of the Musar movement in Eastern Europe, put a great deal of emphasis on business ethics, and taught that just as one checks carefully to make sure their food is kosher, so too should one check to see if his money is earned in a kosher fashion. The Chofetz Chaim’s first published work concerned honesty in weights and measures.
- Some examples in Chassidic thought follow; for further resources here see and. Based on a Maamar of the Lubavitch Rebbe, Menachem Mendel Schneerson, it is learned that meditation and prayer, while spiritually transformative, do not match the power of doing business ethically (Padah B’Shalom, 5739). The Admor of Belz, Rabbi Aharon Rokeach, in discussing the angels descending and ascending on the ladder seen in the dream of Ya'akov, notes that the gematria value of sulam, ladder, is equivalent to that of kesef, money. The teaching here is that while a few are able to ascend spiritually in the way they earn and spend their money others, instead, descend here. Indeed, therefore, "nowhere in the whole field of human activity are the lusts and needs that need separation and religious guidance greater than in this field of human activity". The "Shelah", Isaiah Horowitz, states (in Sha'ar Haotiyot) that

"The Mezzuzah that we affix to the doorpost is connected to the things that we bring in and take out of our houses. We gather into our homes the wealth that G-d has bestowed upon us. All should therefore be in truth and in faith as befits a house on which the Law of G-d is inscribed on the door posts. This is the secret of conducting one's business in faithfulness. In other words, what one brings into the house, that is what one earns, should be in faithfulness. What we take out, what we spend our money on should also be in faith."

== Legal treatment ==
There are over 100 Mitzvot (commandments) concerning commercial and business conduct – a few examples are discussed in the following sub-sections.

The principles relating to these commandments are developed and expanded upon in the Mishnah and the Talmud (particularly in Order Nezikin). The detailed laws are then delineated in the major codes of Jewish law (e.g. Mishneh Torah, particularly books 11. Nezikin, 12. Kinyan and 13. Mishpatim; and Shulhan Arukh, particularly Choshen Mishpat). Further, specific questions here, numbering in the thousands, have been discussed in various responsa over the centuries.

For a general survey, see "The Challenge of Wealth," by Dr. Meir Tamari. Also see Michael S. Perry's "Labor Rights in the Jewish Tradition". And for an overview of ""The Challenge of Wealth as well as the resources listed at; for discussion relating to specific contemporary issues see and below; for a more holistic Halachic discussion, with detailed references, see the works by Marburger and Wagschal in references.

=== Requirement of accurate weights and measures ===
According to the Book of Leviticus (19:35-36): "You shall not falsify measures of length, weight, or capacity. You shall have an honest balance, an honest weight, an honest ephah, and an honest hin."

=== Prohibition of monetary deception (ona'at mamon) ===
Leviticus 25:14 teaches: "When you sell anything to your neighbor or buy anything from your neighbor, you shall not deceive one another." The Talmud (Bava Metzia 49b and 50b) and later codes (Rambam, Mekhira, Chapter 12) expand on this verse to create a series of specific laws prohibiting ona'ah, monetary deception. The prohibition is on the sale of an article at so much more, or to the purchase of an article at so much less, than its market value that fraud or the taking of an undue advantage is presumed. A discrepancy of one-sixth enables the wronged party to secure the cancelation of the sale or purchase; that is, an article worth six money-units in the market may not be sold for seven or bought for five (B. M. 49b). It seems that overcharge by the merchant selling to the consumer was the most frequent instance in which the application of the rule was called for; the claim had to be made as soon as the buyer had had an opportunity to show his purchase to a merchant or to one of his friends. It is said that R. Ṭarfon taught at Lydda that the discrepancy must amount to one-third to justify an action, whereupon the merchants rejoiced; but when he extended the time for rescission to the whole day they demanded the restoration of the old rule.

Either seller or purchaser, whether merchant or one in private life, may make the complaint, notwithstanding the opinion to the contrary of R. Judah ben Ilai. The purchaser imposed upon may ask either for rescission of the transaction or for the return of the excess paid by him.

In the case of changing money it was suggested that a lack in weight of even one in twelve should be sufficient ground for complaint, but the prevailing opinion fixed here also the ratio of one in six. Within a great city the time for complaint extends until the money in question can be shown to a money-changer; in villages, where no money-changer is to be found, until the eve of the Sabbath, when the party deceived is apt to tender the coin in payment for his purchases.

=== Prohibition of verbal deception (ona'at devarim) ===
Leviticus 25:17 teaches: "Do not deceive one another, but fear your God, for I the Lord am your God." Since Leviticus 25:14 was understood as referring to monetary deception, the Talmud concludes that Leviticus 25:17 refers to verbal deception, "ona'at devarim."

In Baba Metziah (iv. 10), the Mishnah proceeds: "As there is 'wronging' in buying and selling, so there is 'wronging' in words; a man may not ask, 'What is this article worth?' when he has no intention of buying; to one who is a repentant sinner it may not be said, 'Remember thy former conduct'; to him who is the son of proselytes one may not exclaim, 'Remember the conduct of thy forefathers'; for it is said, 'Thou shalt neither vex a stranger, nor oppress him'" (Ex. xxii. 21). In a baraita (B. M. 58b) which follows this section the subject is further developed. "When a proselyte comes to study the Law one should not say, 'He that ate the meat of fallen or torn beasts, of unclean and creeping things, now comes to study the Law that was spoken by the mouth of Omnipotence!' When trouble or sickness comes upon a man, or when he has to bury his children, none should say to him, as Job's friends said to Job, 'Where is thy fear of God, thy trust, thy hope, and the innocence of thy ways?'" The baraita forbids also practical jokes. "If ass-drivers come to one for fodder, one may not send them to N. N. to buy it, knowing that N. N. never sold hay or grain in his life."

On the authority of R. Simeon ben Yoḥai, it was said that wronging by words is worse than wronging in trade, for the Scripture as to the former, but not as to the latter, commands, "Thou shalt fear thy God": R. Eleazar says, because one injures the man himself, the other affects only his property; R. Samuel b. Naḥman says, because in one case there is opportunity for restoration, in the other there is not. The Talmud then dwells upon the unpardonable sin of "blanching the face of one's neighbor in public," and closes with the admonition that under all circumstances a man should beware of "wronging" his wife, because her tears are ever ready to accuse him before the throne of God.

=== Geneivat da’at ("stealing a person’s mind") ===
Geneivat da'at, literally "stealing of the mind/knowledge", refers to a kind of dishonest misrepresentation or deception. The prohibition on geneivat da'at is attributed to the Talmudic sage Samuel of Nehardea in Talmud Chullin (94a): "It is forbidden to mislead people, even a non-Jew." One Midrash states that geneivat da'at is the worst type of theft because it directly harms the person, not merely their money. In rabbinic exegesis, the law is associated with Gen. 31:26 and II Samuel 15:6.

Rabbi David Golinkin has explained the principle's application to business ethics as follows:

We would call it false packaging or false labeling. The Talmud gives a number of specific examples: One should not sift the beans at the top of the bushel because he is "deceiving the eye" by making the customer think that the entire bushel has been sifted. It is forbidden to paint animals or utensils in order to improve their appearance or cover up their defects (Bava Metzia 60a-b).

We are all familiar with this kind of ruse. A wholesaler takes an inferior brand of shirt and puts on Pierre Cardin labels. You buy a box of perfect-looking tomatoes or strawberries, only to discover upon opening the box at home that they were packaged with the bad spots facing down. And we all know how used cars are touched up and polished for the sole purpose of overcharging the customer. Such behavior is clearly forbidden by Jewish law.

=== Putting a stumbling block before the blind ===
A statement in the Torah (Leviticus 19:14) prohibits "placing a stumbling block before the blind." Jewish tradition sees this as a figuratively expressed prohibition against misleading people. When it comes to business ethics, Rabbi David Golinkin has pointed to the following examples of what this principle prohibits:

"A real estate agent should not dupe a young couple into buying a home with structural faults simply in order to make a fast buck. A stockbroker should not sell his client a bad investment just to collect the commission. A salesman should not convince his customer to buy an expensive item he really has no use for."

== Contemporary applications ==
There are numerous published responsa dealing with specific contemporary issues; a few of many examples are discussed below.

=== Treatment of workers ===
The Jewish Labor Committee prepared a list of articles, books and other items, by over 60 authors, entitled "Readings on Traditional Jewish texts on Labor and Worker Rights".

Rabbi Michael Feinberg's article "Wage Theft Study Guide: A Jewish Perspective" is also online.

Rabbi Jill Jacobs authored a responsum in 2008, approved by Conservative Judaism's Committee on Jewish Law and Standards, which argued that Jews are obligated to pay their workers on time, strive to pay their workers a living wage, and "to treat their workers with dignity and respect." The responsum prohibited "publicly yelling at, mocking, or otherwise embarrassing workers; forbidding employees from speaking their native languages at work; banning all bathroom breaks; changing work hours or adding shifts without advance notice; or making improper sexual comments or advances toward workers." Enforcing laws regarding the proper treatment of workers in the food industry has been central to the efforts of Conservative Judaism's Hekhsher Tzedek commission.

In 2009, Uri L'Tzedek, an Orthodox social justice organization, introduced the Tav HaYosher, an ethical certification for kosher restaurants and food establishments. Founded by Rabbi Dr. Shmuly Yanklowitz, the initiative ensures fair wages, safe working conditions, and proper treatment of workers, aligning with Jewish labor values. The Tav HaYosher serves as a voluntary commitment by business owners to uphold ethical labor practices, complementing traditional kashrut certification.

=== Not wasting time at work ===
It is important not to steal company time. Rabbis had often noted the importance of working hard, such as the Biblical Jacob, who worked very hard for many years, despite being deceived by Jacob's father-in-law. Therefore, employees should avoid spending too much time on-line (e.g., Facebook) or other diversions when at their job.

=== Whistleblowing ===
Rabbi Barry Leff authored a responsum in 2007, approved by Conservative Judaism's Committee on Jewish Law and Standards, regarding an employee's obligation to report wrongdoing on the part of his or her employer. He concluded that "In any case of wrongdoing, there is an obligation to rebuke the person doing wrong if it can be assumed there is a reasonable chance the rebuke will be listened to, and the rebuke can be administered without substantial personal cost to the reporter."

=== Education ===
Institutions including Harvard University, Brooklyn College, and The Rohr Jewish Learning Institute teach courses on Jewish Business Ethics for students and professionals.

== See also ==
- Divine providence in Judaism
- Torah im Derech Eretz#Earning a livelihood
