= Gezel sheina =

In Jewish law, gezel sheina (גזל שנה, theft of sleep) refers to waking up another person against their wishes. The term was first used by rabbi Israel Meir Kagan in his book Ahavas Chesed.

No law in the Torah or Talmud directly prohibits disturbing another's sleep. Nevertheless, some rabbis have prohibited or discouraged such behavior as being unkind to others and because it cannot be rectified. The closest Torah law that is invoked is Love thy neighbor as thyself (Leviticus 19:18). Concerns are that taking another's sleep injures a person by making them less productive, less able to concentrate properly following their unexpected arousal, less competently able to perform their duties due to lack of sleep, more angry, and depriving one of a meaningful dream.

== Waking up a parent ==
There is a higher degree of stringency to waking up one's parents because of the laws of honoring one's parents. It is permitted to wake one's father if this is necessary in order for him to make a minyan or to recite the Shema on time.

== Viewpoints ==
Rabbi Shmuel Wosner points out that gezel sheina is not an actual act of theft because nothing of value is transferred from the victim to the thief. It is nonetheless forbidden because the victim has been caused physical and emotional damage.

Rabbi Menashe Klein states that though no theft has actually occurred, gezel sheina is nevertheless classified as an act of theft because it is a form of geneivat da'at (theft of the mind) in the physical and emotional pain it causes the victim.
