= Tza'ar ba'alei chayim =

Jewish animal welfare commandment

Tza'ar ba'alei chayim (Hebrew: צער בעלי חיים), literally "suffering of living creatures", is a Jewish commandment that bans causing unnecessary suffering to animals. This concept is not clearly enunciated in the written Torah but was accepted by rabbinic scholars as being a biblical mandate (Genesis 9:4). In the Talmud, the injunction against causing harm to animals derived from the biblical law requiring people to assist in unloading burdens from animals (Exodus 23:5). Therefore, it is regarded both as a biblical and rabbinic commandment.

== Literal meaning ==
Tza'ar is an Hebrew word for "suffering" and is used in rabbinic literature to indicate the unnecessary suffering that humans perpetrate against animals for economic gains, according to The Oxford Handbook of Jewish Ethics and Morality. Ba'alei chayim is an expression literally meaning "owners of life", which is used in the Talmud for "animals".

== Laws ==
=== Slaughter ===
In the Jewish law, kosher animals may be eaten if killed using the slaughter method known as shechitah, where the animal is killed by having its throat cut swiftly using an extremely sharp and specially designed knife. Many rabbis assert that these regulations were put in place to reduce the animal's suffering and to ensure that the animal has the easiest possible death. The design of the kosher knives as well as regulation relating to how the cut is made have been seen to greatly reduce or completely eliminate reaction from the kosher cut. Even modern-day scientists critical of shechita agree that it greatly improved welfare at slaughter in historical periods, though experts disagree regarding shechita's efficacy compared to modern slaughter methods.

In 2000, the Rabbinical Assembly of Conservative Judaism's Committee on Jewish Law and Standards banned the common slaughter method of "shackling and hoisting" (pulling a conscious animal into the air with a chain before slaughter). Rabbis Joel Roth and Elliot Dorff wrote a responsum on this topic which concluded that shackling and hoisting "unquestionably constitutes a violation of Jewish laws that forbid us to cause undue pain to animals."

=== Medical research ===
According to the Shulkhan Aruch, "anything that is necessary for medical purposes, or for anything else, is exempt from the prohibition of causing suffering to animals". Therefore, most Jewish authorities allow medical research on animals as long as it will help people in need, although the animals are forbidden from being subjected to any type of unnecessary suffering. For example, the Central Conference of American Rabbis in Reform Judaism affirms that medical research on animals is permissible if it will save human lives, so long as animals are subjected to little pain and not used in "frivolous" experiments such as cosmetic testing.

=== In the Noahide Covenant ===
A concern for suffering caused to animals is found in the Seven Laws of Noah (Sheva Mitzvot B'nei Noach), a set of universal moral laws which, according to the Talmud, were given by God as a covenant with Noah and with the "sons of Noah"—that is, all of humanity. One of the seven Noahide laws, ever min ha chai, prohibits eating flesh torn from a living animals. This law is derived from Genesis 9:4, as interpreted in the Talmud.

=== Vegetarianism and veganism ===
A number of authorities have described tza'ar ba'alei chayim as requiring or leading to the adoption of a vegetarian or vegan diet. Israeli rabbi Asa Keisar has argued that the slaughter of animals in contemporary times violates tza'ar ba'alei chayim and should not be considered kosher. Israeli rabbi Simchah Roth has argued that contemporary slaughter "constitutes cruelty to animals [tza'ar ba'alei chayim] which is forbidden by the Torah." American rabbi Geoffrey Claussen has written that considering tza'ar ba'alei chayim may lead to "committing to a vegan diet and boycotting the animal agriculture industry." American author Richard H. Schwartz has claimed that tza'ar ba'alei chayim is a central reason for Jews to become vegetarians.

=== Other areas of concern for animals in Jewish law ===
Resting on the Sabbath also meant providing rest for the working animals, and people are instructed to feed their animals before they sit down to eat. At harvest time, the working animals must not be muzzled, so that they can eat of the harvest as they work.

A prohibition against using two different kinds of animals teamed together, such as ploughing or doing other work, is derived from the Torah in Deuteronomy 22:10 and the Mishnah in tractate Kila'yim elaborates upon this prohibition. The underlying concern is for the welfare of the animals, particularly the weaker of the pair.

Sports like bullfighting are forbidden by most authorities. Rabbi Ovadia Yosef has characterized bullfighting as "a culture of sinful and cruel people" which is opposed by Torah values.

== Narrative traditions ==
One midrash declares compassion for animals to have been the merit of Moses that made him the shepherd of his people. This midrash has sometimes been linked with the commandment of tza'ar ba'alei chayim.

In one narrative in the Talmud, Judah ha-Nasi saw in his own ailment the punishment for having once failed to show compassion for a frightened calf. This midrash has sometimes also been linked with the commandment of tza'ar ba'alei chayim.

== Organizations ==
=== The Shamayim V'Aretz Institute ===
The Shamayim V'Aretz Institute is a Jewish animal protection group that educates leaders, trains advocates, and leads campaigns for the humane treatment of animals. Shamyim V'Aretz is led by rabbi Shmuly Yanklowitz and has run campaigns which seek to end: kosher certification of veal, the practice of kapparot, and the kosher certifying of cattle that are killed using shackle and hoist techniques.

=== Magen Tzedek ===
Enforcing a commitment to tza'ar ba'alei chayim in food production has been part of the effort of Conservative Judaism's Magen Tzedek commission, formerly known as Hekshher Tzedek. The Magen Tzedek commission sees compliance with the Humane Farm Animal Care Standards (HFAC) as sufficiently preventing unnecessary suffering to animals. Amid disputed claims of Orthodox opposition the Magen Tzedek commission has not been successful in recruiting any food producers into its certification program.

=== The Jewish Initiative For Animals ===
The Jewish Initiative For Animals (JIFA) supports innovative programs that seek to turn the Jewish value of tza'ar ba'alei chayim into action and build Jewish American communities in the process. In November 2016 JIFA partnered with kosher meat distributors KOL Foods and Grow and Behold to bring a run of kosher certified heritage breed chickens to market for the first time in approximately 50 years. Heritage breed chickens and turkeys are able to achieve highest possible welfare outcomes. Thus, the renewed availability of heritage chicken to kosher consumer has helped expand values of tza'ar ba'alei chayim within the modern kosher meat industry. JIFA has also sought to spread the values of tza'ar ba'alei chayim into the Jewish world through its Ark Project, a service-learning curriculum for b’nai mitzvah. This curriculum seeks to engages with Jewish teaching and real life problems about topics such as homeless animals, animals used in entertainment, farmed animal welfare, conservation of wildlife and more.

=== Jewish Veg ===
Jewish Veg is an organization whose mission is to encourage and help Jews to embrace plant-based diets. The organization teaches that "tsa'ar baalei chaim, the prohibition on causing animals pain, is one of the most beautiful teachings in Judaism. Our Jewish sacred texts strongly emphasize compassion for animals, and strongly oppose the infliction of suffering on another living creature."

=== Hazon ===
Hazon is a Jewish organization dedicated to environmental education. In December 2015, it introduced animal welfare as a core value of its agenda. The organization teaches that "preventing unnecessary cruelty to animals, or tza'ar ba'alei chayim, is a core value in Judaism."

== See also ==
- Animal rights movement
  - Abolitionist veganism
  - Animal welfare and rights in Israel
  - List of animal rights advocates
- Animal theology
- Buddhism and Judaism
- Comparison of Islamic and Jewish dietary laws
- Environmental vegetarianism
- Ethics of eating meat
- Fasting in Judaism
- Jewish ethics
- Judaism and environmentalism
- Vegetarianism and religion
  - Ahimsa
  - Buddhist cuisine and vegetarianism
  - Jewish vegetarianism
