= B'nai Emet Synagogue (St. Louis Park, Minnesota) =

Former synagogue in St. Louis, Minnesota, United States

- Location off the former synagogue in Minnesota

Religion
- Affiliation: Conservative Judaism (former)
- Ecclesiastical or organizational status: Synagogue (1889–2011); Yeshiva (since 2011)
- Status: Closed (merged); Repurposed (as a yeshiva)

Location
- Location: Ottawa Avenue, St. Louis Park, Minnesota
- Country: United States
- Interactive map of B'nai Emet Synagogue
- Coordinates: 44°57′45″N 93°24′45″W

Architecture
- Established: 1889 (as B'nai Abraham)
- Completed: c. 1890s (15th Avenue South); 1920 (Thirteenth Avenue South); 1959 (Ottawa Avenue)

B'nai Emet Synagogue is a former Conservative Jewish congregation and synagogue located on Ottawa Avenue, in St. Louis Park, Minnesota, in the United States.

The synagogue had its origins in a number of earlier synagogues and congregations that merged in the course of a century, so that the earliest roots of B'nai Emet can be traced back from 1889 until it moved to its final location in 1956. It was used as a location for the Coen brothers' 2009 film A Serious Man. The congregation was affiliated with the United Synagogue of Conservative Judaism and in 2011 merged with the Adath Jeshurun Congregation, and put its building up for sale.

== History ==
The earliest synagogue component was Congregation B'nai Abraham established in 1889 and incorporated in 1891 in a South Minneapolis neighborhood by Romanian Jewish immigrants. It was known as the "Rumanian Schil" or the "Rumanian Hebrew Congregation."

The congregation's first home, on 15th Avenue South between 3rd and 4th Streets, seated about 300 people followed the customs of Romanian Jews.

The second building, at 825 Thirteenth Avenue South, was B'nai Abraham's home for 36 years starting in 1920. The synagogue had its own Talmud Torah (supplementary religious school for children's Torah study) until 1927, when Minneapolis Talmud Torah built a South Side structure and B'nai Abraham closed its Talmud Torah.

In 1942, Rabbi Hardin served for two years. Later, Reuben Maier became rabbi of the congregation. His wife Sophie was the daughter of Alexandru Șafran, chief rabbi of Romania until his death. In 1952, Mordecai Liebhaber succeeded Maier.

The congregation built a new sanctuary and center dedicated in 1959. B'nai Abraham grew from 10 families before the move in the 1950s to 400 families in 1971 when B'nai Abraham and Congregation Mikro-Tifereth voted to merge, creating B'nai Emet Synagogue, under Rabbi Sylvan Kamens.

By 2011 membership was down to 225, from a peak in the 1980s of over 900. The congregation merged with the Adath Jeshurun Congregation, and held its last service in June of that year. The building on Ottawa Avenue was put up for sale and is now owned by an Orthodox Jewish high school, known as the Yeshiva of Minneapolis.

== See also ==
- List of synagogues in Minnesota
