= B'nai Abraham =

B'nai Abraham or B'Nai Abraham (Hebrew for "Sons/Children of Abraham") may refer to the following Jewish synagogues:

- B'nai Abraham Synagogue (Virginia, Minnesota), now a museum and cultural center
- Temple B'Nai Abraham (Livingston and Newark, New Jersey)
- Historic Congregation B'nai Abraham (Philadelphia, Pennsylvania)
- B'nai Abraham Synagogue, the former name of Congregation Tiferet Israel (Austin, Texas) before its relocation from Brenham, Texas
