= Jewish Women Artists' Circle =

- Formation: 2005
- Purpose: organization of Jewish women artists who study Jewish sources with scholars in the community and create artworks on selected Jewish themes
- Headquarters: Twin Cities, Minnesota
- Website: jewishwomenartistscircle.com

The Jewish Women Artists' Circle is a women's artist collective based in the Twin Cities of Minnesota. It was founded by Lucy Rose Fischer in the summer of 2005.

The group consists of a number of women artists in different fields, who study with scholars on Jewish themes and have developed a number of exhibits. The collective's 2008 exhibition Neshama: Visions of the Soul was held at the University of Minnesota's Larson Art Gallery. Their 2010 exhibition, Tikun:Repair, was held at Adath Jeshurun Congregation and the Basilica of Saint Mary in Minneapolis.
