= List of synagogues in Minnesota =

This is a list of Minnesota synagogues, including the city in which each is located and the branch of Judaism with which each is affiliated.

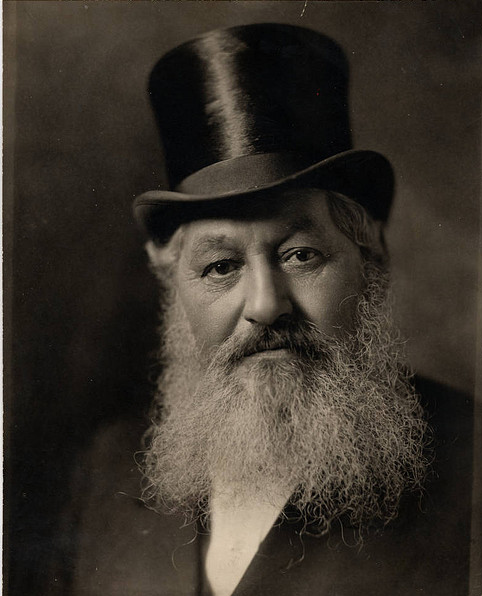
Rabbi Solomon Silber, who served as Kenesseth Israel's rabbi from 1902 to 1925

Name	City	Affiliation	Notes
Adas Israel Congregation	Duluth	Orthodox	Destroyed by fire in 2019
Adath Israel Synagogue	St. Paul	Orthodox	
Adath Jeshurun Congregation	Minnetonka	Conservative	
Bais Yisroel Synagogue	St. Louis Park	Orthodox	
Bet Shalom Congregation	Minnetonka	Reform	
Beth El Synagogue	St. Louis Park	Conservative	
Beth Jacob Congregation	Mendota Heights	Conservative	
B'nai Abraham Synagogue	Virginia	former	
B'nai Emet Synagogue	St. Louis Park	former	
B'nai Israel Synagogue	Rochester	Reform	
Chabad Lubavitch of Greater St. Paul	St. Paul	Orthodox	
Chabad Lubavitch of Minneapolis	Minnetonka	Orthodox	
Chabad of Duluth MN	Duluth	Orthodox	
Chabad Lubavitch of Rochester	Rochester	Orthodox	
Chabad of St. Louis Park	St. Louis Park	Orthodox	
Congregation Bris Avrohom	St. Paul		
Darchei Noam	St. Louis Park	Orthodox	
Kenesseth Israel Congregation	St. Louis Park	Orthodox	
Mayim Rabim Congregation	Minneapolis	Reconstructionist	
Mikvah Association	St. Paul		
Mikvah Ritualarium	St. Louis Park		
Mount Zion Temple	St. Paul	Reform	
Or Emet Congregation	St. Paul	Humanistic	
Shaare Shalom Congregation	Mendota Heights	Conservative	
Sharei Chesed Congregation	Minnetonka	Conservative	
Shir HaNeshamah	Minneapolis	Jewish Renewal	
Shir Tikvah Congregation	Minneapolis	Reform	
Temple Israel	Minneapolis	Reform	
Temple Israel	Duluth	Reform	
Temple of Aaron Congregation	St. Paul	Conservative	
Upper Midwest Merkos - Lubavitch House	West St. Paul	Orthodox	
