= Beth Jacob Congregation (Mendota Heights, Minnesota) =

Beth Jacob
- Location in Minnesota

Religion
- Affiliation: Conservative Judaism
- Ecclesiastical or organisational status: Synagogue
- Leadership: Rabbi Tamar Grimm (Acting); Rabbi Morris Allen (Emeritus)
- Status: Active

Location
- Location: 1179 Victoria Curve, Mendota Heights, Minnesota 55118
- Country: United States
- Administration: United Synagogue of Conservative Judaism
- Coordinates: 44°53′6″N 93°9′5″W

Architecture
- Established: 1985 (as a congregation)
- Groundbreaking: October 25, 1987
- Completed: 1988

Website
- www.beth-jacob.org

Beth Jacob Congregation is a Conservative synagogue located in Mendota Heights, Minnesota, in the United States. The congregation was founded in 1985, and the existing synagogue was completed in 1988.

== Activities ==
Regular services take place on weekday mornings, on the Shabbat, including dedicated children's services, and on the Jewish holidays.

The community has received nine national programming awards from the United Synagogue of Conservative Judaism for its social activities (Chesed). Beth Jacob also participated in a nationwide study of the Conservative movement in the United States, the results of which were published in the book "Jews in the Center: Conservative Synagogues and their Members".

The kosher certification process Magen Tzedek ("Justice Certification") was pioneered by Rabbi Morris Allen of Beth Jacob in response to a scandal involving kosher meat producer Agriprocessors in 2006.

== See also ==
- List of synagogues in Minnesota
