= Adas Israel Congregation (Duluth, Minnesota) =

Orthodox Jewish synagogue in Minnesota

- Members of the Adas Israel Synagogue, in 1914

Religion
- Affiliation: Modern Orthodox Judaism (former)
- Ecclesiastical or organizational status: Synagogue (former)
- Status: Destroyed by arson

Location
- Location: 3rd Street, Duluth, Minnesota
- Country: United States
- Interactive map of Adas Israel Congregation

Architecture
- Established: c. 1890s (as a congregation)
- Destroyed: September 9, 2019 by arson

Adas Israel Congregation (or Adath Israel Congregation, but known locally as the 3rd Street Shul) was a Modern Orthodox Jewish synagogue located in Duluth, Minnesota, established in the late 19th century. Until its destruction by arson on September 9, 2019, it was the oldest surviving Orthodox synagogue in Duluth having outlived and incorporated several Orthodox synagogues in the Twin Ports area. By 1973, it was the only Orthodox synagogue in Duluth.

It could also be described as a Jewish "traditionalist" congregation because in official communal guidelines it is officially described as "an Orthodox/high Conservative congregation" meaning that its members are composed of some Orthodox Jews as well as those who practice an older form of traditional Judaism. It is described as having a membership of 75. Services were lay-led with daily minyans, Saturday morning and holiday services.

On September 9, 2019, the 3rd Street synagogue was destroyed by a fire, caused by arson.

== Geography and membership ==
Duluth is a seaport city in the U.S. state of Minnesota and the county seat of St. Louis County. It forms a metropolitan area with Superior, Wisconsin, Called the Twin Ports, these two cities share the Duluth-Superior Harbor and together are one of the most important ports on the Great Lakes, shipping coal, iron ore (taconite), and grain. This unique location attracted Jewish settlers who set up a number of synagogues that still serve Jews from the surrounding areas:

The Duluth area Jewish community is a mix of families that have been here for five generations, persons who have come to work in the three universities or the medical services industry, and [those] who followed other types of jobs or their hearts to this beautiful area. It is a diverse community...[The] community also includes families across the state line in Superior and other Jewish families within a hundred-mile radius of Duluth in Northeastern Minnesota and Northwestern Wisconsin. The Jewish Community consisted of two synagogues. Adas Israel Congregation was an Orthodox congregation with a membership of 75. Services were lay-led with daily minyans, Saturday morning and holiday services. Temple Israel was a Reform / Conservative congregation. This building was the hub of the Jewish community, with religious, educational and cultural events taking place in the facility.

== Community and synagogue history ==
The origins of this synagogue are tied in with the earliest settlement of Minnesota by Jews fleeing persecutions in Eastern Europe including Russia, Lithuania, Ukraine and Hungary in the 19th century. In one published family history, the synagogue's establishment is described as part of the development of Jewish, indeed European, communal life:

In 1871, my father's grandparents, Nettie and Bernard Silberstein from Hungary, were the first Jewish newlyweds to make their home in Duluth, Minn., when it was a western frontier town with mostly Native Americans in the region. He established the first synagogue and the dry goods store that set the standard of quality for merchants who followed...In the beginning, in the Russian Empire of the early 1800s... We lived in villages and shtetls, like Novoukrainka and Revutskoye, in the rich farmland between Odessa and Kiev, near Yelisavetgrad, now Kirovograd. At first we spoke Russian and Yiddish, then English, some better than others. We devotedly helped each other get from Russia to Duluth and Superior, then to establish homes and businesses...Landing on the Atlantic Coast in 1883, my great-grandfather "Little Joe" and his brother Israel...walked most of the way to northern Minnesota along the construction route of the new Canadian-Pacific Railway...In Spring, 1884 they arrived by boat in Duluth Harbor, among the first eastern Europeans there...All this time, cousin Yosef Mendel Oreckovsky, well-trained in Russia, was assistant rabbi at Orthodox Temple Tifereth Israel and later helped found Congregation Adas Israel, the "Fourth Street shul".

Other histories record that Adas Israel was formed in the 1890s by members of the Moses Montefiore congregation, an earlier Orthodox congregation composed of Lithuanian Jews. By the turn of the 20th century, there were close to 1,500 Jews living in Duluth, most of who were Russian or Eastern European. The men in the picture were observing Simchas Torah, the holiday marking the end of the weekly cycle of Torah readings. (1914)...The men are assembled on the bimah (the stage or platform in front of the Ark) containing the Torah scrolls of Adas—literally, "'congregation' Israel". (1919).

Female members of the congregation were active with social, humanitarian and charitable causes. "The Adas Israel Ladies' Aid of Duluth are ... examples of Orthodox synagogue' women's groups that helped the poor, the sick and the needy as well as their own synagogues."

In 1930, Adas Israel absorbed the B'nai Israel Synagogue of Duluth.

Adas Israel was the oldest surviving original synagogue, being a continuation of earlier synagogues and a living symbol of a surviving active Jewish community in northeast Minnesota. It was the only surviving Orthodox synagogue, until the establishment of a Chabad Hasidic synagogue in 2001.

== Destruction ==
A fire which began just before 2.30 am on September 9, 2019, totally destroyed the building. It was thought that eight of the 14 Torah scrolls were able to be saved from the debris. A suspect, Matthew Amiot, was arrested on September 13 and was to be charged with first-degree arson. No one was in the building at the time of the fire. Amiot had no permanent address and was reported to suffer from multiple mental health issues. He was later sentenced to a year in jail.

== See also ==
- List of synagogues in Minnesota
