= Adath Jeshurun Congregation =

Synagogue in Minnetonka, Minnesota, US

Adath Jeshurun
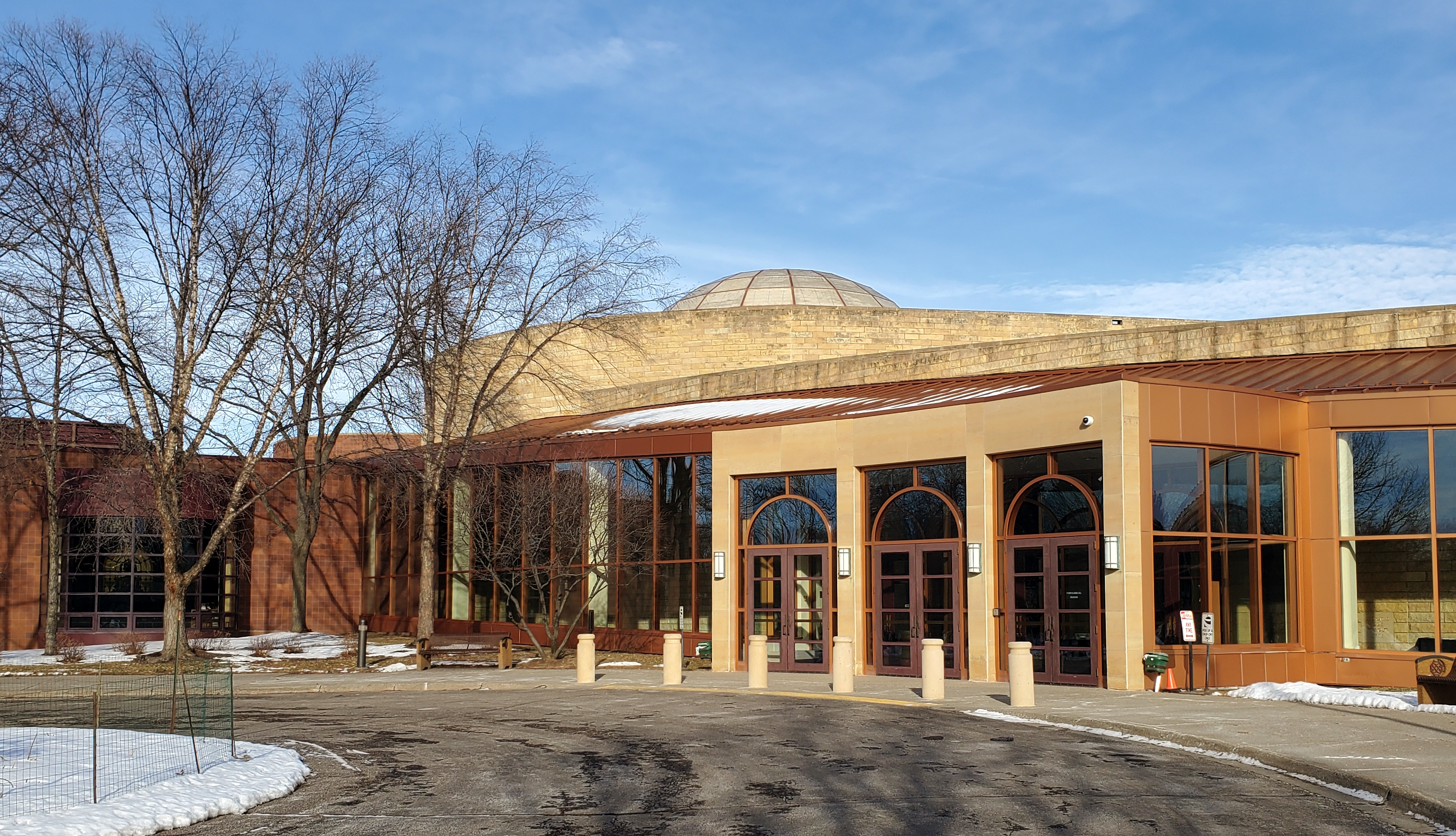
- Main entrance

- Location in Minnesota

Religion
- Affiliation: Conservative Judaism
- Ecclesiastical or organizational status: Synagogue
- Leadership: Rabbi Aaron S. Weininger; Rabbi Harold J. Kravitz (Emeritus)
- Status: Active

Location
- Location: 10500 Hillside Lane West, Minnetonka, Minnesota 55305
- Country: United States
- Interactive map of Adath Jeshurun
- Administration: United Synagogue of Conservative Judaism
- Coordinates: 44°57′45″N 93°24′45″W

Architecture
- Established: 1884 (as a congregation)
- Completed: 1995

Specifications
- Capacity: 1,200 worshippers
- Interior area: 75,000 square feet (7,000 m^{2})

Website
- adathjeshurun.org

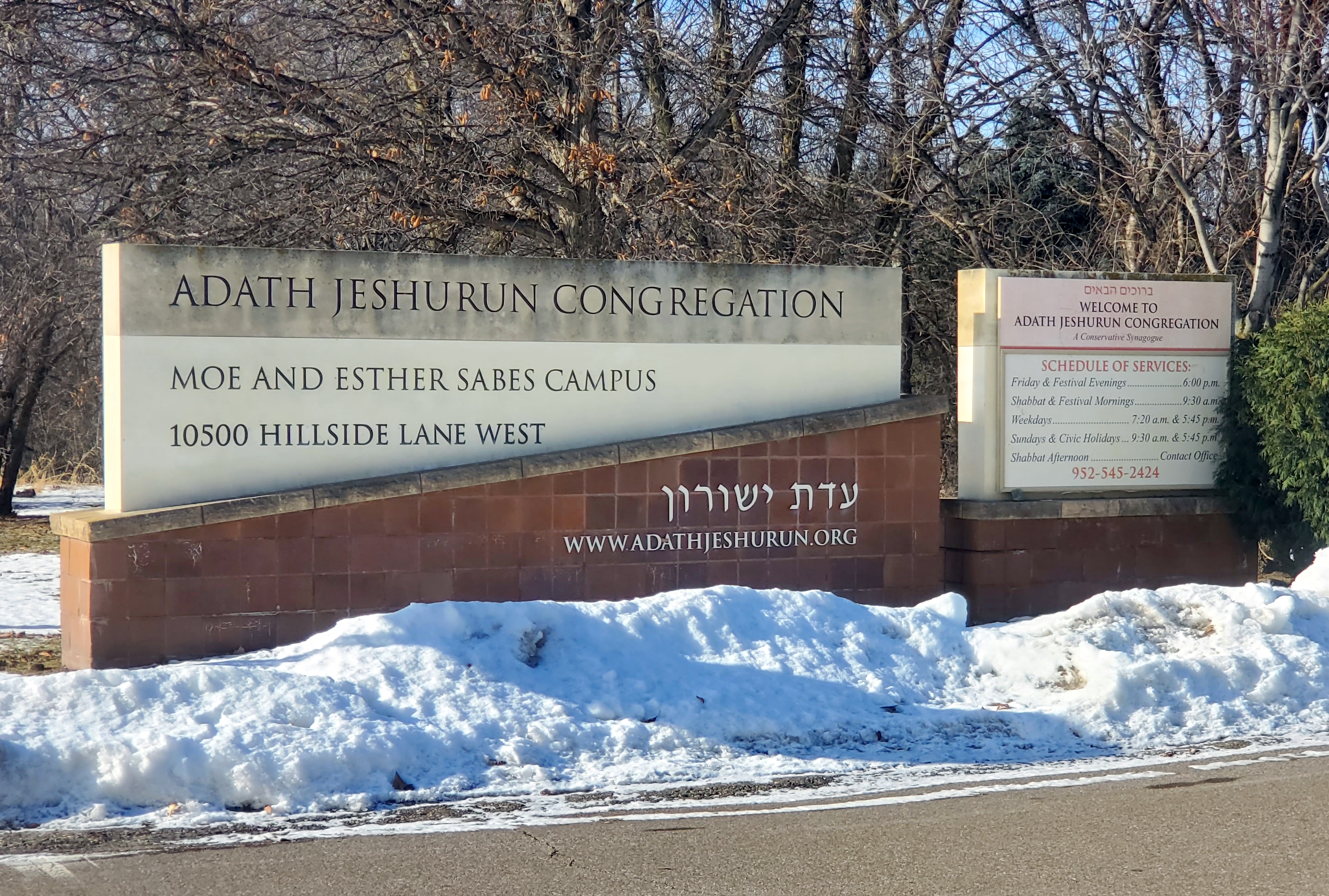
Entrance sign

Adath Jeshurun Congregation (also Adath Jeshurun Synagogue) is a Conservative synagogue located in Minnetonka, Minnesota, in the United States, with about 1,200 members. Founded in 1884, it is a founding member of the United Synagogue of America, a founding member of the Women's League for Conservative Judaism, and the oldest affiliate of the United Synagogue of Conservative Judaism west of Chicago.

== Early history ==
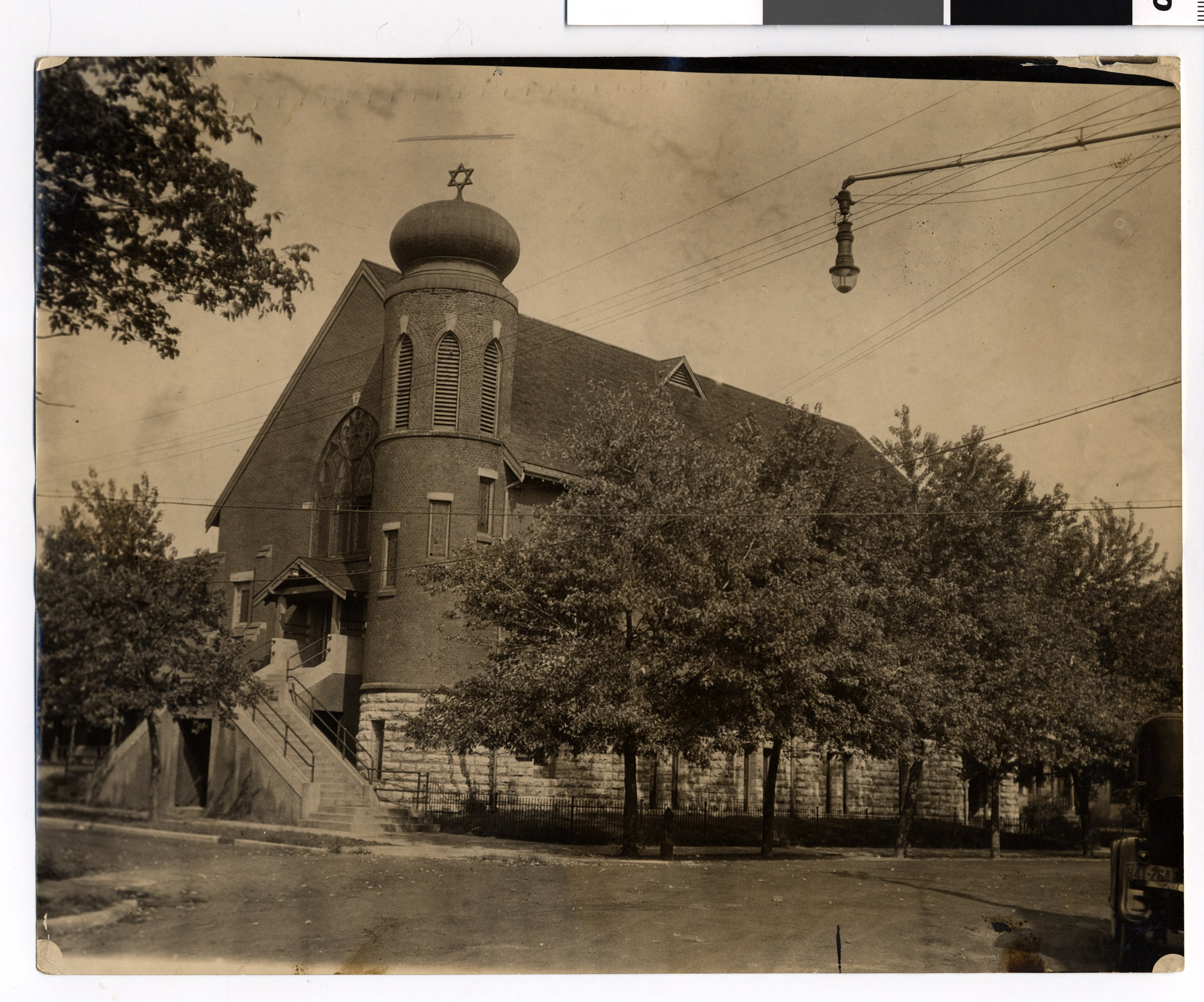
The synagogue in the 1920s at 9th Street and 12th Avenue, Minneapolis

Adath Jeshurun was founded in 1884 by two small groups of Romanian and Russian Jews. Although the congregation, originally known as A’Tas Yeshurun, began by closely following orthodox Jewish customs, it soon became the first Conservative congregation west of the Mississippi River. In its early years, the synagogue faced three major disasters: In 1888, while in rented premises, a fire destroyed all of its property, and in 1902 a windstorm completely destroyed the congregation's synagogue on Second Street South. The congregation subsequently purchased a church on Seventh Street South in 1903, but it too was destroyed in a windstorm in 1904.

In 1912 Adath Jeshurun hired C. David Matt, its first American trained rabbi, and the first to give sermons in English. In 1913 Adath Jeshurun was one of the founding members of the United Synagogue of America, and in 1918 its sisterhood helped found the Women's League for Conservative Judaism.

== Recent events ==
Adath Jeshurun is "the oldest affiliate of the United Synagogue of Conservative Judaism west of Chicago." It describes itself as "a progressive, egalitarian, and sacred community dedicated to Torah (learning and tradition), Avodah (prayer and spirituality), and Gemilut Hasadim (acts of loving kindness)" and it has relocated several times to newer neighborhoods.

In 1995 it dedicated a 75,000-square-foot (7,000 m^{2}) seat suburban facility with space for all of the congregation's religious services, social events, education programs and administrative functions. Three indoor arches at the entrance to the Grand Foyer recall Adath Jeshurun's former synagogue and the three "pillars" of the congregation's mission – Torah, service, and good deeds.

In April 2024, Aaron Weininger was installed as the first openly gay senior rabbi of any large Conservative congregation, as senior rabbi of Adath Jeshurun.

== Conservative Judaism and activism ==
Aaron Brusso has been a rabbi at Adath Jeshurun Congregation. He is a graduate of the Jewish Theological Seminary of America (JTSA) and has spoken in favor on "The Courage to be Conservative".

Brusso, as representative of the congregation, spoke out in favor of a Hechsher Tzedek, or "Justice Certification" which is a proposed certification for food produced in a way that meets standards of social justice for workers and animals, promoted by modern-day Conservative Judaism activists. In July 2007 the synagogue hosted a symposium about ethical standards in the kosher food industry:

If successful, it will create "justice certificate" labels on kosher foods, letting the consumer know that the producer of the product met working standards like wages, safety, benefits and corporate transparency...Rabbi Aaron Brusso will moderate the discussion. Brusso is a 35-year-old Chicago native and graduate of Jewish Theological Seminary in New York City and is in his seventh year at Adath Jeshurun...Q[uestion:] How and why did Adath Jeshurun get involved with this initiative? We are a conservative congregation, and this is a movement-wide initiative.

Brusso and the synagogue signed on to a "Call to Action" about the war in Darfur joining many Jewish groups that was sent to President Bush and all members of Congress.

== Cultural center ==
The synagogue has hosted various innovative exhibits. In 2006 it hosted an exhibit on "the theme of 'Jewish women and prayer'", about which the Star Tribune noted:

It was an intriguing idea, to explore prayer life through art - the works resonate with the passion the artists feel about expanding women’s roles in worship tradition, celebrating life among global unrest, and experiencing oneness — and an occasional wrestling match—with God. (Delma Francis, March 4, 2006)

The synagogue hosts significant debates, such as hosting the Jewish Community Relations Council of Minnesota that co-organized a debate with CNN's Crossfire hosts Paul Begala and Tucker Carlson in 2004.

The synagogue has hosted lectures in conjunction with the University of Minnesota, such as by Avivah Zornbert of the London School of Jewish Studies (formerly known as "Jews' College") during 2006.

== See also ==
- American Jews
- History of the Jews in the United States
- List of synagogues in Minnesota
