= Geneivat da'at =

Jewish legal concept meaning "dishonest misrepresentation" or "deception"

Geneivat da'at or g'neivat daat or genebath da'ath (Hebrew: גניבת דעת, lit. 'theft of the mind', from Hebrew גנבה 'stealing' and דעת 'knowledge') is a concept in Jewish law and ethics that refers to a kind of dishonest misrepresentation or deception. It is applied in a wide spectrum of interpersonal situations, especially in business transactions.

== Sources ==
The origin of the term is attributed to Samuel of Nehardea in the Babylonian Talmud: "It is forbidden to mislead people, even a non-Jew." One Midrash states that geneivat da'at is the worst type of theft. Geneivat da'at is the worst because it directly harms the person, not merely their money. In rabbinic exegesis, the law is associated with Genesis 31:26 and 2 Samuel 15:6.

False impressions are permissible in certain circumstances, for example, in order to honor someone. For instance, one generally should not invite a guest to take from an anointing oil, while knowing that the oil container is empty. Yet, one may offer the empty oil container so as to honor the guest and publicly display one's regard for the guest. Similarly, one may offer fine oil in order to honor a guest, even if the guest is likely to refuse the oil anyway.

Geneivat da'at is transgressed with a statement that is technically accurate but intended to leave a false impression. While such deception often involves commercial transactions, according to rabbinic law, deception is prohibited even if there is no monetary loss at stake. Thus, the rule applies both to business sales as well as gift-giving.

A simple example of geneivat da'at would be to invite someone to dinner, merely to appear hospitable, knowing full well that the recipient would decline due to a prior commitment.

== Contemporary applications ==
Writers on Jewish ethics have applied geneivat da'at to a variety of contemporary ethical dilemmas.

In Jewish business ethics, the prohibition against leaving a false impression is commonly applied to advertising and sales techniques. Geneivat da'at enables ethicists to analyze improper selling techniques, such as employing a pretext to enter a home in order to make a door-to-door sales pitch. Claims to sell at a discount may run foul of geneivat da'at, when the catalog is deceptive. Specifically, if there is no suggested retail price, the catalog should not claim to offer a discount based on the seller's own estimated "standard" price. Likewise, discounts based on misleading pretexts, such as a closing down sale when the store does not close, also transgresses geneivat da'at. Furthermore, the principle has been used to caution against overdone packaging, which leaves the impression of a larger product. Similarly, advertising a luxury item as if it were a necessity, and any claims or even wrapping paper that leaves a false impression could cross the line set by geneivat da'at rules.

Through this principle, Jewish law has been applied to evaluate secular regulations of advertising. For instance, Levine argues that it is impermissible to advertise a promise not to be undersold, without comparable details of its policy to match prices. He notes approvingly that the Federal Trade Commission took action against an analogous deceptive advertising in a case against Thompson Medical Company, regarding misleading ads for a product that did not contain any aspirin.

Insider treatment and misleading shareholder information would also be governed by this principle.

In addition, geneivat da'at has been applied to other forms of misrepresentation in contemporary life. For instance, Reform rabbis have argued that the transfer of assets to children, so as to feign poverty and shield assets from a nursing home, is prohibited by this principle.

Cheating can also be forbidden under the geneivat da'at principle. For instance, Rabbi Moshe Feinstein wrote, drawing partly on this principle, that yeshivas must not allow students to cheat on the annual Regents examinations and their schools should not misrepresent grades. Nor should the yeshiva cheat on government subsidies by misrepresentions, such as inflating the number of its students.

Proper citations are also at stake. An author or speaker who fails to attribute secondary sources may also violate geneivat da'at. Granted, if the audience does not expect explicit attributions, while it realizes that the speaker relies on secondary sources, then there would be no false impression. Nonetheless, the speaker should not rely on their own intuition about audience expectations, but rather consider only "a small, yet significant statistical probability" (mi'ut ha-matzui). How small? According to Levine, the audience expectation is quantified under halakhah. On the one hand, a speaker would not be required to cite sources merely to disabuse someone's rare, naive expectation that sources are cited. On the other hand, if 10 or 15 percent of the audience do indeed expect attribution, then a failure to identify one's secondary sources would be a violation of geneivat da-at.

The concept is incorporated in three provisions of Meir Tamari's proposed "Halakhic Corporate Code of Ethics"—insider trading (even where permitted by secular law), product information and advertising, and fraudulent financial accounting reports.

== Bibliography ==
- Friedman, Hershey H. "Geneivat Da'at: The Prohibition Against Deception in Today's World" (Jlaw.com)
- Golinkin, David. "Some Basic Principles of Jewish Business Ethics", USCJ Review, Spring 2003.
- Levine, Aaron. Various works on business ethic and case studies.
- Meir, Asher. The Jewish ethicist: Everyday ethics for business and life, KTAV 2004, pp. 61–65 on market research and pp. 227–229 on mass marketing and spam
- Povarsky, Chaim (1995). "Responsa Literature on Contemporary Issues: Cheating on Tests." Jewish Law Report, Touro College, June 2002.
- Resnicoff, Steven. "A Jewish View on Cheating" (Jlaw.com)
- Spitz, Tzvi (1997). "Geneivas Da'as: Misleading Others" (Business Halacha, Torah.org)
