= Shmuly Yanklowitz =

American rabbi, activist, and author

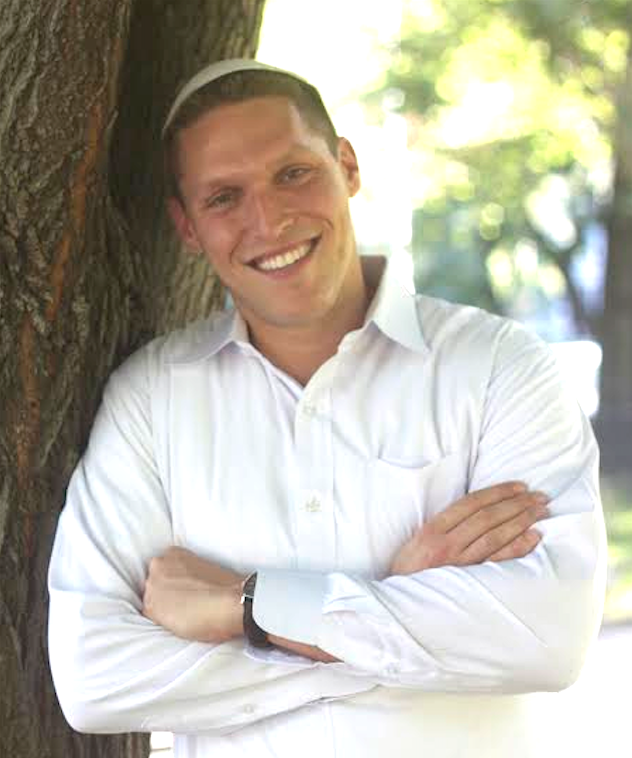
- Title: Rabbi

Personal life
- Born: 1981 (age 44–45) Toronto, Canada
- Spouse: Shoshana
- Education: University of Texas, Harvard University (Masters), Yeshiva University (Masters), Columbia University (PhD)

Religious life
- Religion: Judaism

Jewish leader
- Residence: Scottsdale, Arizona

Shmuly Yanklowitz (born 1981) is an American rabbi and activist. In March 2012 and March 2013, Newsweek listed Yanklowitz as one of the 50 most influential rabbis in America.

== Educational and professional background ==
Yanklowitz was ordained as an Orthodox rabbi at Yeshivat Chovevei Torah, received a second rabbinic ordination from Rabbi Shlomo Riskin, the chief rabbi of Efrat, and a third rabbinic ordination from Rabbi Nathan Lopes Cardozo of Jerusalem. He earned a master's degree at Harvard University in Leadership and Psychology and a second master's degree in Jewish Philosophy at Yeshiva University. Yanklowitz earned a doctorate from Columbia University in Epistemology and Moral Development.

Yanklowitz worked in corporate and non-profit consulting and was the director of Panim Judaism, Activism and Mitzvah work (JAM) in Washington, D.C., training others in leadership and advocacy. While in rabbinical school, Yanklowitz served at four different Orthodox congregations. Yanklowitz served as Senior Jewish Educator and Director of Jewish Life at UCLA Hillel from 2010 to 2012 following his ordination. Yanklowitz has served as a delegate to the World Economic Forum. In July 2013, he became the executive director of Valley Beit Midrash (VBM) in Phoenix, Arizona, and later assumed the roles of president and dean. Yanklowitz expanded VBM from a local initiative to a national organization, establishing a new hub in Denver, Colorado around August 2022 according to Boulder Jewish News. As the leader of VBM, Yanklowitz has promoted religious pluralism.

In 2025, Yanklowitz launched a new initiative called "Thrive By Character" seeking to spark a new American discourse and replace the current divisive political rhetoric with a more uniting discourse focused on character. He is building off his research from his Masters at Harvard and his Doctorate at Columbia University in Moral Development and his disillusionment that activism can create lasting change without human transformation.

A film crew followed Yanklowitz for over a year to produce a PBS documentary named The Calling, a series that follows seven Muslims, Catholics, Evangelical Christians, and Jews as they train to become professional clergy. The program aired in the United States in December 2010.

== Recognition ==
- The Forward named Yanklowitz one of the 50 most influential Jews of 2016 and also one of the most inspiring rabbis in America.
- In 2020, Yanklowitz was named a "Hero of Dialogue" by the international group KAICIID.
- In 2022, Yanklowitz was honored by The Leonard I. Beerman Foundation For Peace and Justice, alongside Dolores Huerta.
- In 2022, Yanklowitz was recognized as one of the top faith leaders to watch by the Center for American Progress.
- Yanklowitz spoke at the White House Passover Seder and has been a regular at the White House Chanukah events.
- Phoenix mayor Greg Stanton appointed Yanklowitz to be a commissioner on the Phoenix Human Relations Commission.

== Child Welfare ==
Yanklowitz founded YATOM: The Jewish Foster & Adoption Network in 2017. Yanklowitz's organization YATOM provides "educational programs and provides small grants" to families in the adoption/fostering process. He has been a foster parent.

== Orthodox social justice ==
- Yanklowitz founded Uri L'Tzedek, an Orthodox social justice organization. In 2025, Uri L'Tzedek was expanded to Washington DC. In May 2009, Yanklowitz and the Uri L'Tzedek team launched the Tav HaYosher, an ethical seal for Kosher restaurants that has certified hundreds of restaurants around North America.
- Yanklowitz has advocated for refugees and asylum seekers at the Mexico-United States border, calling the need to assist asylum seekers a "spiritual revolution". Yanklowitz is critical of what he claims is the mistreatment of asylum seekers. Through Uri L'Tzedek and Arizona Jews for Justice, Yanklowitz and partners have raised awareness on the issue and have led campaigns to collect supplies for asylum seekers released by Immigration and Customs Enforcement.
- Yanklowitz has led initiatives to support Afghan refugees.
- Yanklowitz founded Torat Chayim, a "progressive-minded" Orthodox rabbinic association.

== Humanitarian efforts ==
Yanklowitz founded and leads the Jewish social justice group Arizona Jews for Justice. Yanklowitz founded the Shower Project, which has provided thousands of free showers to people experiencing homelessness.

Yanklowitz and the Arizona Jews for Justice team launched a mobile cooling van, with the support of the City of Phoenix, to give relief to individuals experiencing homelessness during extreme heat. Yanklowitz and the Arizona Jews for Justice team added the "Let's be Better Humans" humanitarian bus to their outreach approach. In 2025, Yanklowitz expanded the bus project to also serve low income families by opening the Shalom Pantry. Yanklowitz has worked to support people recovering from addiction. Yanklowitz has organized in the Jewish community for criminal justice reform and the abolition of the death penalty.

In 2015, Yanklowitz donated his kidney to a stranger. He has advocated for a regulated organ market, cadaveric organ donation, as well as for living kidney donation.

In 2012, Yanklowitz co-founded "Jews for Human Rights in Syria" and has worked closely with Syrian refugees, including hosting new refugee families annually at his home for Thanksgiving.

== Jewish veganism ==
Yanklowitz is vegan. He founded SHAMAYIM: Jewish Animal Welfare (previously known as the Shamayim V'Aretz Institute), an animal welfare and spiritual activism center.

Yanklowitz has written extensively on questions of Jewish veganism and vegetarianism. He has argued that Jewish animal ethics can encompass both speciest frameworks and more egalitarian frameworks. Yanklowitz has opposed the shackle-and-hoist method of slaughter.

Yanklowitz was featured in the 2019 documentary A Prayer for Compassion about veganism and spirituality.

== Publications ==
Yanklowitz has published over 30 books.

In 2022, Yanklowitz was a finalist for a book award with Indies Books, and he won a Silver medal book award in 2023, and in 2015 was also a finalist for a book award with the Jewish Book Council.

== Personal life ==
Yanklowitz is married to Shoshana, has four biological children, has fostered children, and lives in Scottsdale. Yanklowitz himself underwent an Orthodox conversion to Judaism, as he is the son of a Jewish father and a Christian mother.
