= Meir Tamari =

Israeli economist and author (1927–2021)

- מאיר תמרי
- Born: Leopold Fagov; November 3, 1927; Cape Town, South Africa
- Died: January 20, 2021 (aged 93); Israel
- Education: University of Cape Town (B.A. in Economics); City University of London (Ph.D. in Economics)
- Occupations: Economist, author
- Known for: Work on Jewish business ethics
- Notable work: With All Your Possessions: Jewish Ethics and Economic Life; The Challenge of Wealth: A Jewish Perspective on Earning and Spending Money; Al Chet: Sins in the Marketplace; Jewish Values in our Open Society: A Weekly Torah Commentary

Meir Tamari (Hebrew: מאיר תמרי; 1927–2021) was an economist and author whose work is in the field of Jewish business ethics. He was among the first individuals to teach university courses, write scholarly works, and establish a study center in this field.

== Biography ==
Tamari was born Leopold Fagov in Cape Town, South Africa, in 1927, and graduated from the University of Cape Town with a degree in economics in 1948. Tamari was an active member of the Zionist Bnei Akiva youth group, and in 1950, he joined other members of this group in moving to Israel. At first he settled in Kfar Darom, moving soon afterwards to Kibbutz Shluchot. Tamari coined his Hebrew name from the palm trees—Hebrew tamar—in Shluchot.

In 1960, Tamari became an economist at the Bank of Israel, attaining the status of Senior Economist in 1967. He was responsible for the bank's Corporate Finance Project, analyzing the economic characteristics of manufacturing firms. This study attracted international attention. In 1971, Tamari served as a special consultant to the UK Royal Commission on Small Firms, and later he was invited by the French Centre national de la recherche scientifique (CNRS) to make a comparison of corporate financial patterns in various countries. This research formed the basis of his doctoral thesis at the City University of London, which granted him a Ph.D. in 1976. The thesis was later published as a book, Some International Comparisons of Industrial Financing.

Subsequently, Tamari served as senior lecturer in economics at Bar Ilan University. Bar Ilan defines itself as a religious Jewish university, but Tamari was disturbed by the seeming disconnect between the Jewish and academic identities of the school and its students. He wrote: "Although the university is an Orthodox Jewish institution, I found myself teaching course in corporate finance in exactly the same way I would have done in any other university in the world, with the content completely divorced from a Jewish value system." He began to introduce more Jewish sources and content into his economics courses, in order to emphasize that Jewish tradition adopts a particular ethical approach to economic issues and problems.

Ultimately, Tamari "created a special course that would attempt to present to the students this value system and its practical application to economics". This was the first, or among the first, accredited business ethics course offered in an Israeli institution of higher learning. These courses helped Tamari to lay the foundations of his approach to Jewish business ethics.

In 1987, Tamari published With All Your Possessions: Jewish Ethics and Economic Life based on the Bar Ilan University course. This was followed by The Challenge of Wealth: A Jewish Perspective on Earning and Spending Money (1995), Al Chet: Sins in the Marketplace (1996), and Jewish Values in our Open Society: A Weekly Torah Commentary (2000).

In 1992, Tamari founded the Center for Business Ethics and Social Responsibility, on the campus of the Jerusalem College of Technology. He continues to serve as the honorary head of the center. Today, the center is known as the Business Ethics Center of Jerusalem.

Meir Tamari died in January 2021.

== Jewish business ethics ==
Tamari's approach to business ethics is characterized by integration and harmonization of the various aspects of Jewish economic activity. In With All Your Possessions, Tamari criticizes Werner Sombart and Max Weber for focusing solely on contemporary Jewish behavior, and neglecting Jewish tradition and religion. By comparison, Aaron Levine of Yeshiva University, who has published books on the topic of Jewish business ethics, bases his approach almost exclusively on the religious side, namely normative dictates of Jewish law (halacha). Another common approach focuses on homiletic expressions from the Bible and other Jewish sources about the importance of integrity. Tamari's work combines all these resources. Tamari's work makes use of communal records of medieval Jewish communities. Communal enactments recorded in these records are often significantly different from the kind of codified legal directives used by Levine.

Tamari does not claim that Judaism dictates a specific type of economic regime; he writes: "Judaism does not propose any specific economic theory or system; rather, it proposes a moral-religious framework within which the theory or system must operate". However, in other writings he makes clear that Judaism does place certain limits on economic systems.

Tamari says that champions of capitalism use the Jew as a role model for private enterprise. The problem with these arguments is that they separate Jewish economic practices from Jewish sources. These sources impose important restraints on the free market model, restraints that derive from the peculiarly Jewish concepts of mutual responsibility while capitalism is based on egotism and selfishness.

According to Tamari, despite Judaism's insistence on economic justice, charity, and mutual assistance, it also recognizes the legitimacy of private property, the profit motive and the market mechanism. In other words, neither socialism nor total laissez-faire capitalism is consistent with Jewish values.

== Awards ==
Tamari has been awarded the "Transparency Shield" from Transparency International.

== Selected publications ==
- Tamari, Meir (1977). Some international comparisons of industrial financing: a study of company accounts in the U.K., U.S.A., Japan, and Israel. Technicopy.
- Tamari, Meir (1987). With All Your Possessions: Jewish Ethics and Economic Life. Free Press. ISBN 978-0-02-932150-8.
- Tamari, Meir (1991). In the Marketplace: Jewish Business Ethics. Targum/Feldheim. ISBN 978-0-944070-28-4.
- Tamari, Meir (1995). The Challenge of Wealth: A Jewish Perspective on Earning and Spending Money. J. Aronson. ISBN 978-1-56821-280-7.
- Tamari, Meir (1996). Al Chet: Sins in the Marketplace. Jason Aronson. ISBN 978-1-56821-906-6.
- Tamari, Meir (2000). Jewish Values in Our Open Society: A Weekly Torah Commentary. Jason Aronson. ISBN 978-0-7657-6122-4.
- Tamari, Meir (2011). Truths Desired by God: An Excursion Into the Weekly Haftarah. Gefen Publishing House Ltd. ISBN 978-965-229-451-7.

== Sources ==
- Tamari, Meir (1977). Some international comparisons of industrial financing: a study of company accounts in the U.K., U.S.A., Japan, and Israel. Technicopy.
- Tamari, Meir (1987). With All Your Possessions: Jewish Ethics and Economic Life. Free Press. ISBN 978-0-02-932150-8.
