= Women's League for Conservative Judaism =

American Jewish women's organization

Women's League for Conservative Judaism (WLCJ) is the national representative body in the United States for women within Conservative Judaism. Headquartered at The Jewish Theological Seminary in New York City, it is active in 400 synagogues across North America.

== Overview ==
The WLCJ was founded by Mathilde Schechter in 1918, originally named the National Women's League of the United Synagogue. The vision of the organization was to serve as the coordinating body for Conservative synagogue sisterhoods.

== Positions and values ==
=== Pro-choice activism in the 1970s–1980s ===
The Women's League for Conservative Judaism in the 1970s and 1980s used the phrase "religious freedom" to defend their policy on Women's right to an abortion. They argued that banning or restrictions on abortion was a violation of their "religious values." The members of this organization "overwhelmingly favored legal abortion and largely sympathized with the feminist movement." The organization argued that "the continued power of Christian leaders to delimit the public terms of religious discourse, even in a country with no established religion," was infringing on their religious rights and "values." The organization also discussed the role of "the women's right to choose" and how this has manifested and is reinforced by official Jewish scripture such as the Hebrew Bible.

The group attempted to manage the general beliefs of the overarching Conservative Jewish communities with the more progressive beliefs of the younger generation of Jewish practitioners.
