= B'nai Abraham Synagogue (Virginia, Minnesota) =

Historic former synagogue in Minnesota, US

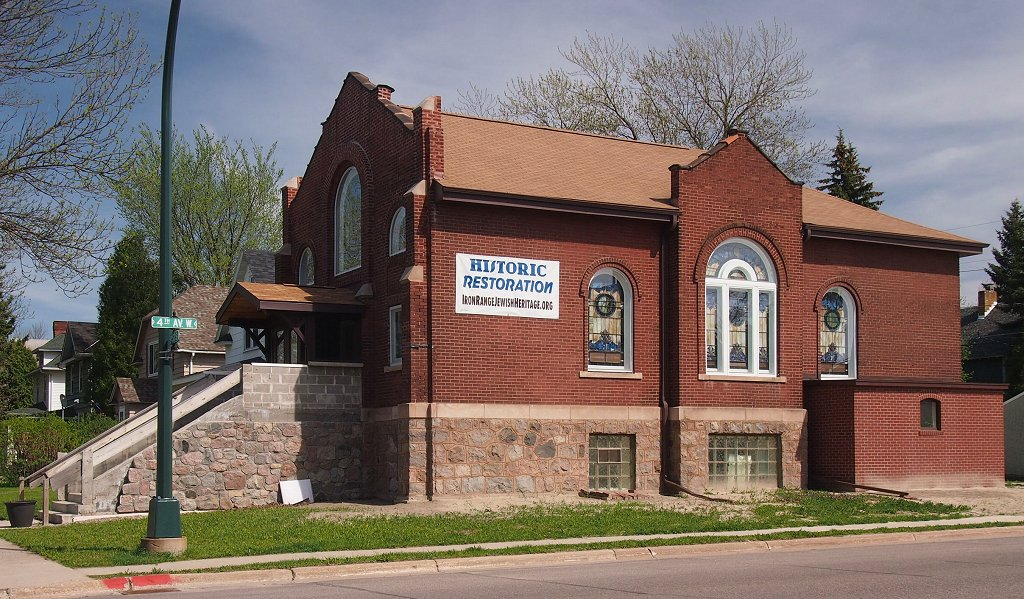
- The former synagogue, in 2014

- Location in Minnesota

Religion
- Affiliation: Judaism (former)
- Ecclesiastical or organizational status: Synagogue (1905–c. 1995); Jewish history museum (since 2008); Performance venue (since 2020)
- Ownership: Northern Lights Music Festival
- Status: Closed (as a synagogue); Repurposed (as a museum and performance space)

Location
- Location: 328 South 5th Street, Virginia, Iron Range, Minnesota
- Country: United States
- Interactive map of B'nai Abraham Synagogue
- Coordinates: 47°31′6″N 92°32′11″W

Architecture
- Type: Synagogue architecture
- Style: Romanesque Revival
- Established: 1905 (as a congregation)
- Completed: 1909
- Materials: Red bricks
- B'nai Abraham Synagogue
- U.S. National Register of Historic Places
- Area: Less than one acre
- NRHP reference No.: 80004356
- Added to NRHP: August 18, 1980

The B'nai Abraham Synagogue is a former Jewish congregation and synagogue, now repurposed as a Jewish history museum and performance venue, located in Virginia, Minnesota, in the United States. It was constructed in 1909 as the first purpose-built synagogue on the Iron Range. It served as the heart of the local Jewish community in the early 20th century. The building was listed on the National Register of Historic Places in 1980 for its local significance in the themes of religion and social history. It was nominated for attesting both to the ethnic diversity of the Iron Range and to the commonality of its immigrant groups maintaining cohesion around religious centers.

A declining congregation forced the synagogue to close its doors in the mid-1990s. However, community support and renovations have preserved B'nai Abraham as a museum and cultural center.

== Background ==
Virginia became a hub of lumber and mining industry in the 1890s. Jewish merchants and clerks soon settled in the newly established town. In 1894, Jews from Virginia and nearby communities began to hold religious services in Virginia's old North Pole Hall. Most of Virginia's Jewish population were immigrants from an area of the Russian Empire that is now Lithuania.

As the town boomed, so too did its Jewish population. Members of Virginia's growing Jewish community founded the congregation of B'nai Abraham in 1905. They held their first meeting in Virginia's Socialist Opera House on November 20. Their first goal was the construction of a synagogue. Other Iron Range synagogues in Hibbing and Eveleth were converted churches. B'nai Abraham was the first synagogue to be built on the Range.

== Origin and use ==
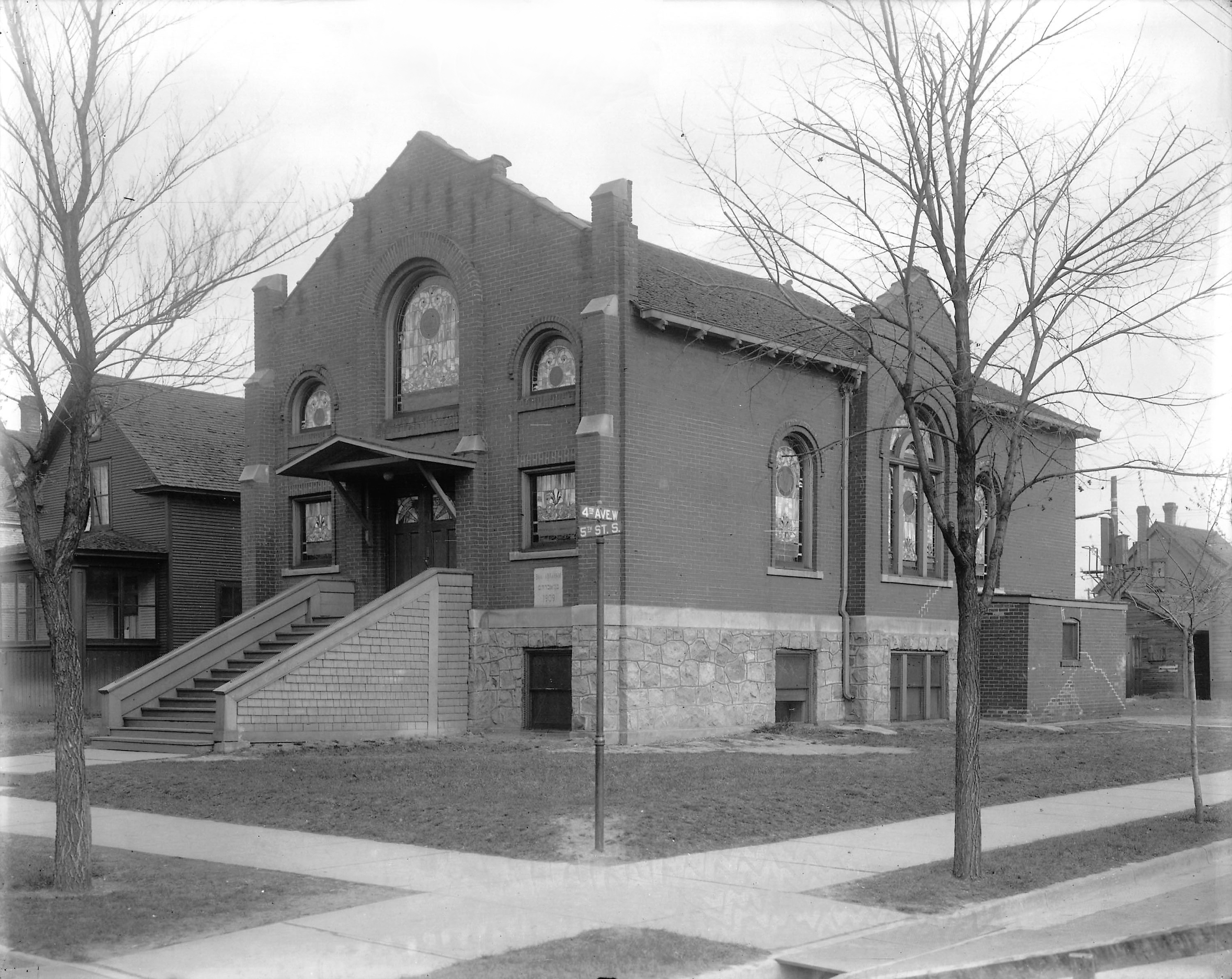
B'nai Abraham Synagogue in 1926

The women of the congregation formed the B'nai Abraham Ladies' Aid Society in 1908. They began to raise funds for the construction of a synagogue and were very successful. Among their contributions to the building effort was the donation of $700 (equivalent to $25,083 in 2025) to purchase one of B'nai Abraham's 13 stained glass windows. The Ladies' Aid Society continued long after the synagogue's construction was complete. The group of women called themselves the Sunshine Club. They visited sick members of the congregation, hosted community events, and assisted new Jewish immigrants in the area.

The synagogue served as the heart of Virginia's tightly interwoven Jewish community. Visiting rabbis conducted services. Holidays and Bar Mitzvahs were celebrated in the synagogue. B'nai Abraham was also used as a gathering place for weddings, birthdays, and retirements. The synagogue served as a meeting place for the Virginia chapters of several Jewish organizations including B'nai B'rith and Hadassah.

The synagogue's distinctive stone foundation, windows, Romanesque Revival style, and red brick exterior make B'nai Abraham one of Virginia's most recognizable landmarks. In 1980 B'nai Abraham was the first Minnesota synagogue to be listed on the National Register of Historic Places.

== Decline and restoration ==
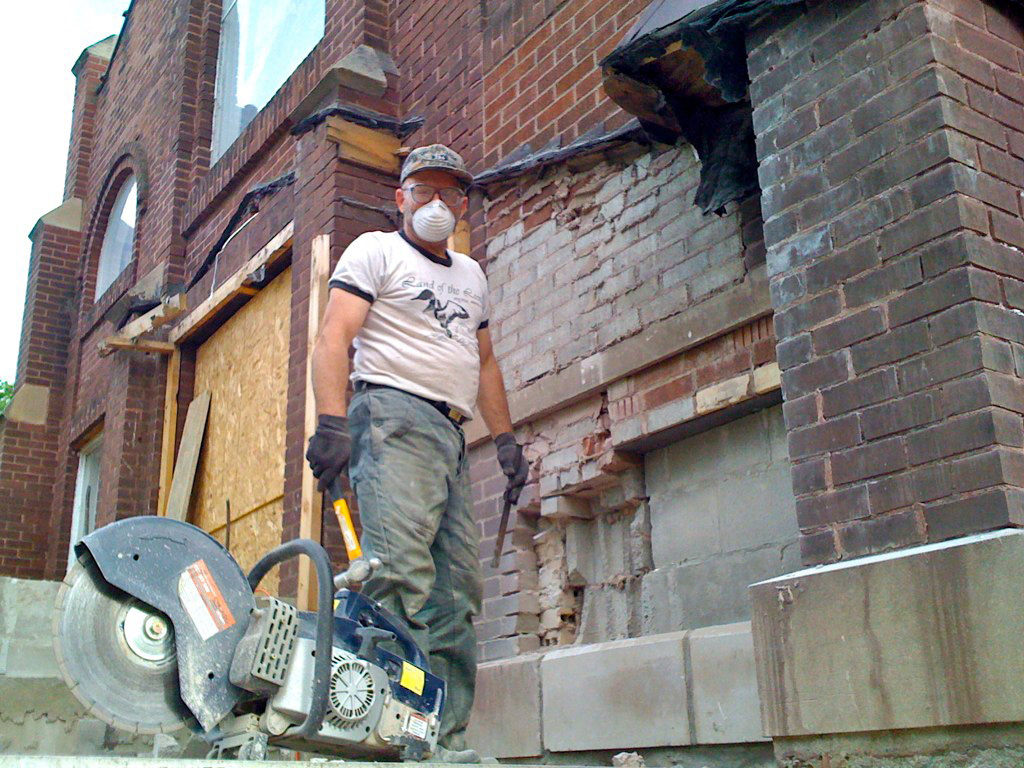
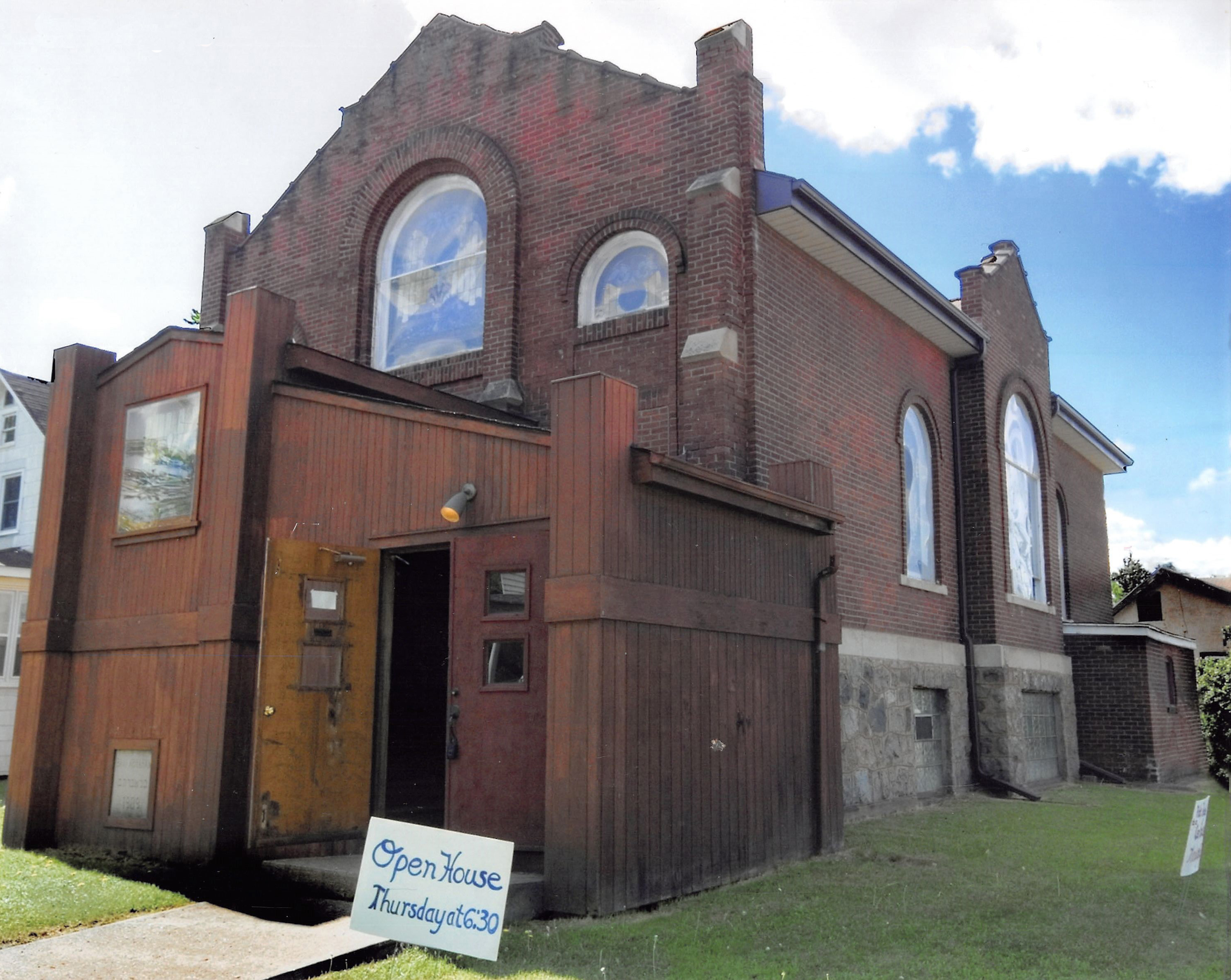
Left: Brick repair; Right: Exterior before restoration in 2006

During the second half of the twentieth century, the Jewish population on the Iron Range declined. Falling membership had the forced the closure of synagogues in Hibbing, Chisholm, and Eveleth. By 1990 B'nai Abraham was the last synagogue on the Iron Range. In the mid-1990s B'nai Abraham also closed its doors. By 2002 the congregation had declined to two members. That year the building was listed as one of the most threatened historic structures in Minnesota.

In 2004 a nonprofit organization, the Friends of B'nai Abraham, formed to save the building. They acquired it from its previous owners and began to restore the historic building with the help of state and local grants as well as donations. The building reopened in the summer of 2008, and was managed by the Friends organization.

== B'nai Abraham Museum and Cultural Center ==
It is used as a cultural center and museum and includes a permanent exhibit documenting the history of Jewish settlement on the Iron Range.

In 2020, Friends of B'nai Abraham conveyed building ownership responsibility for management of the building to the nonprofit organization, Northern Lights Music Festival, which used the building as a performance venue and to expand musical offerings by the organization. The Northern Lights non-profit became solely responsible for management of the building.

== Gallery ==
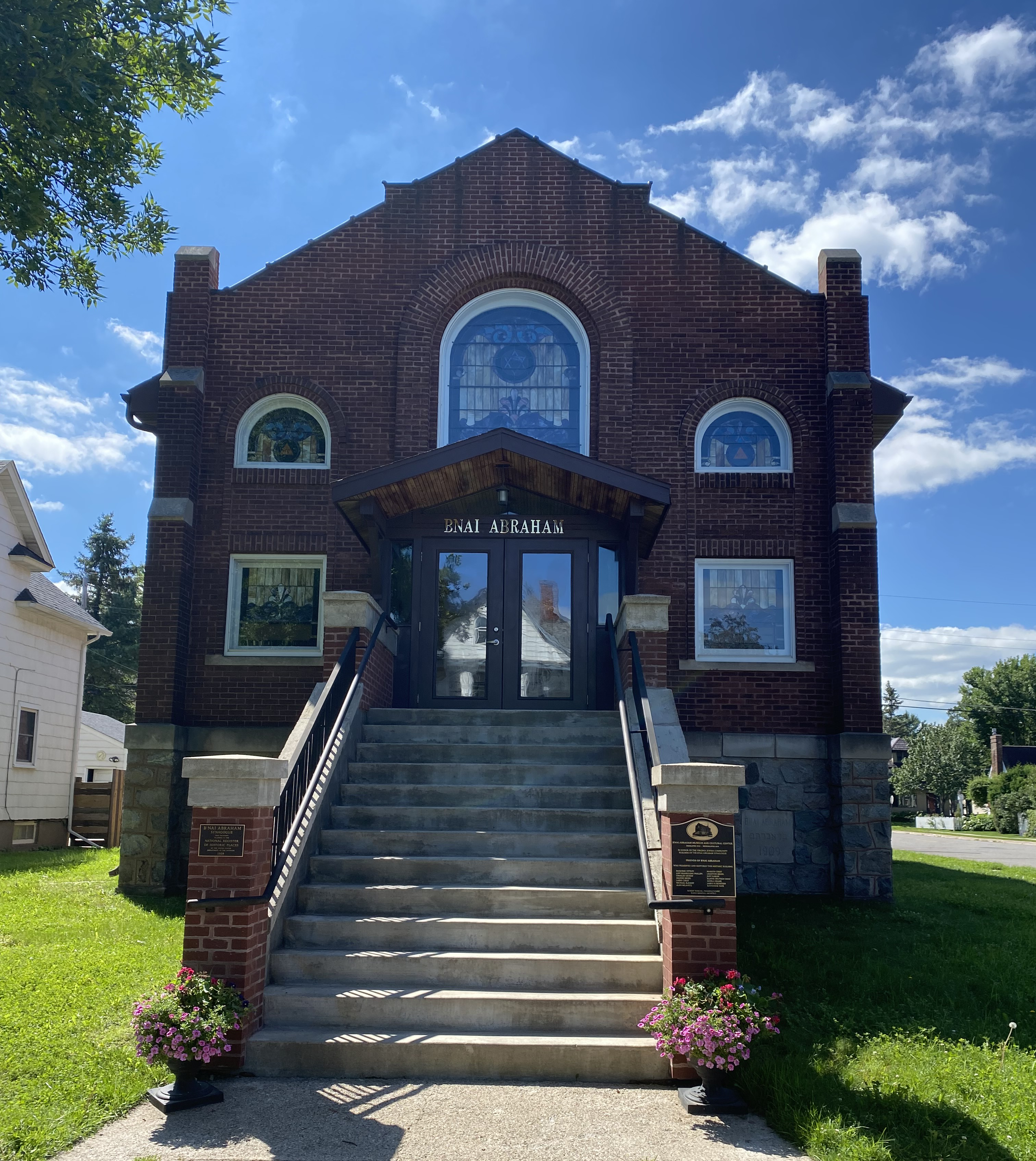
Front exterior

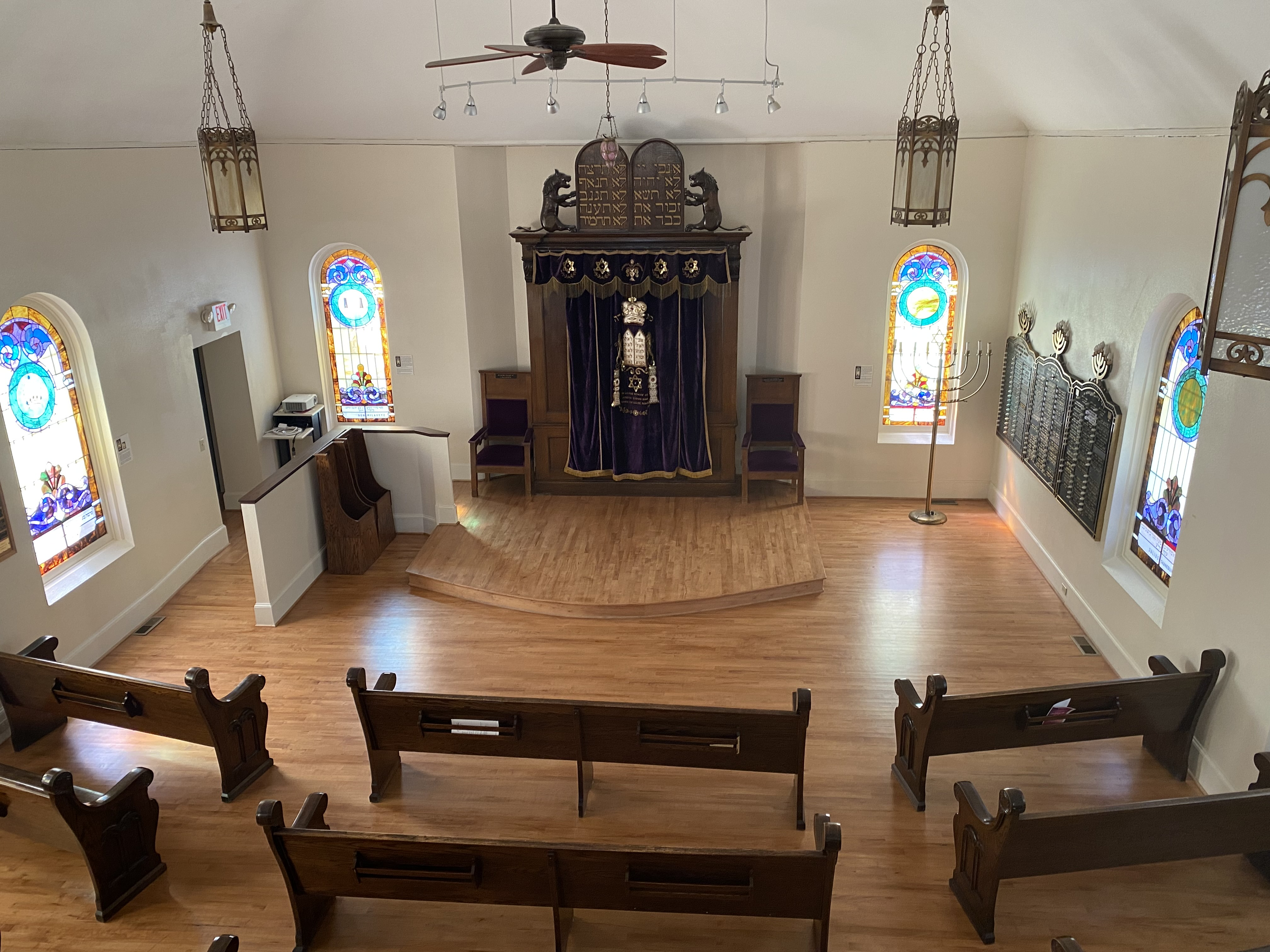
Sanctuary performance area

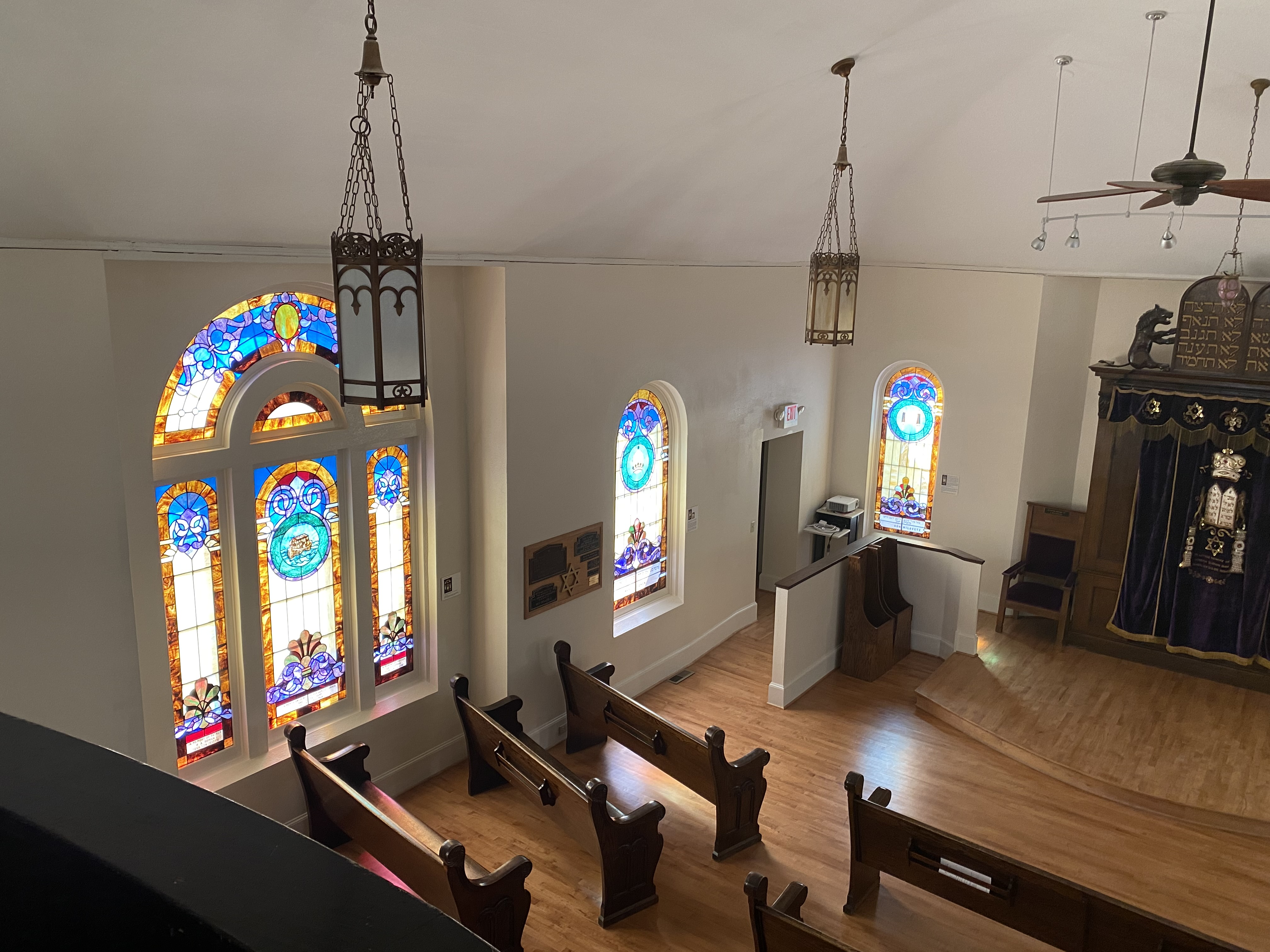
East windows

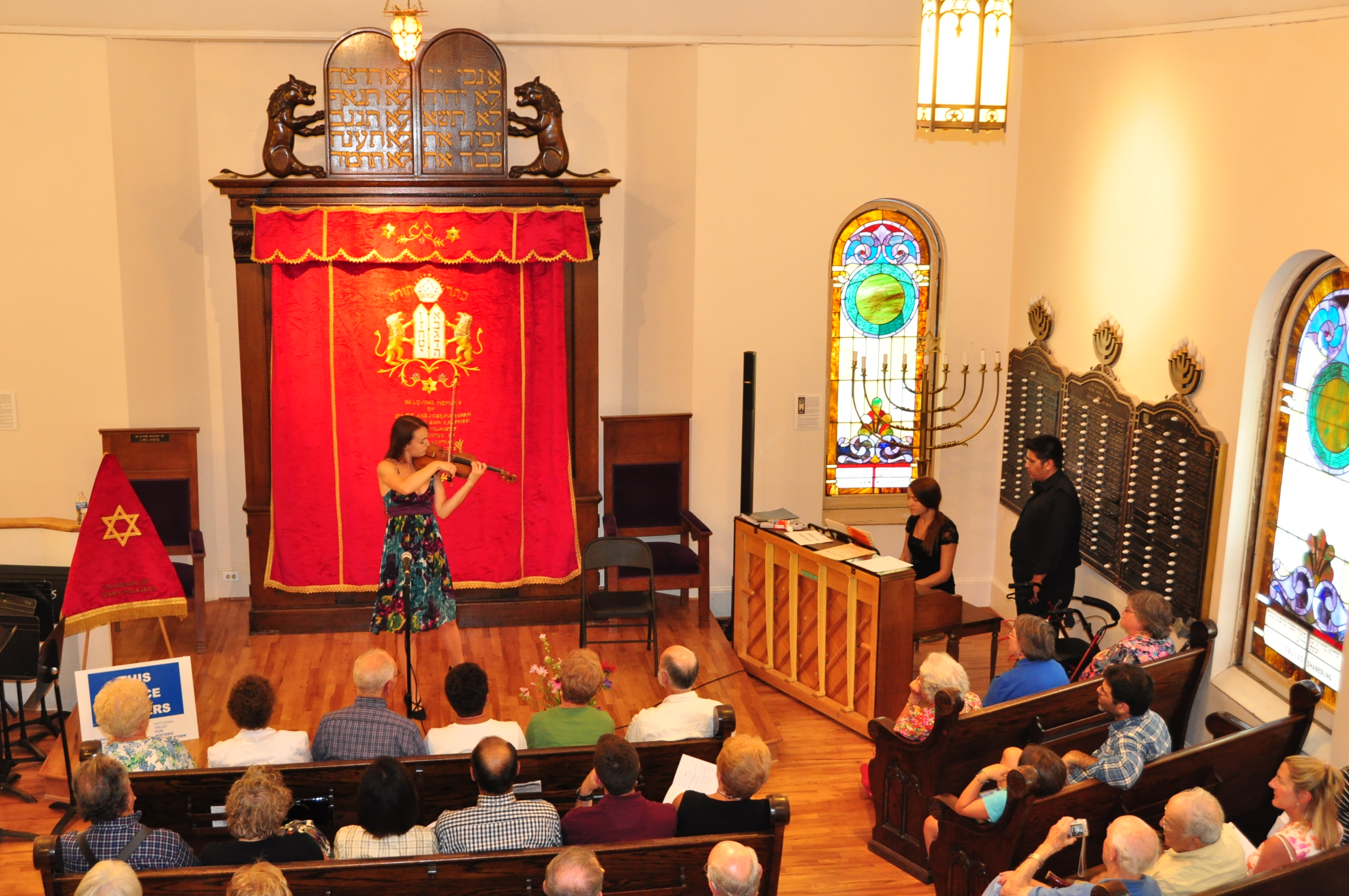
Performance

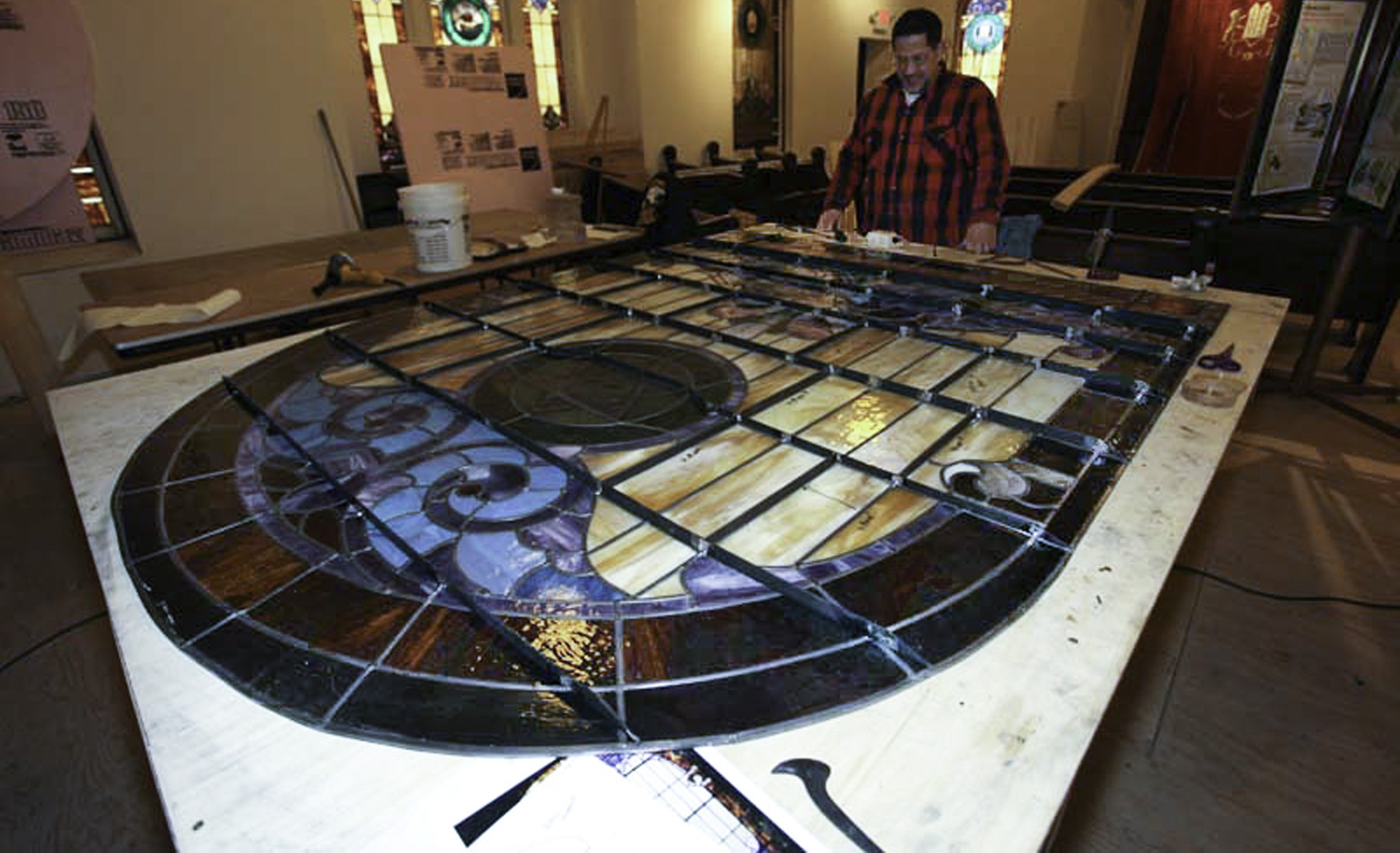
Mounting stained-glass window supports

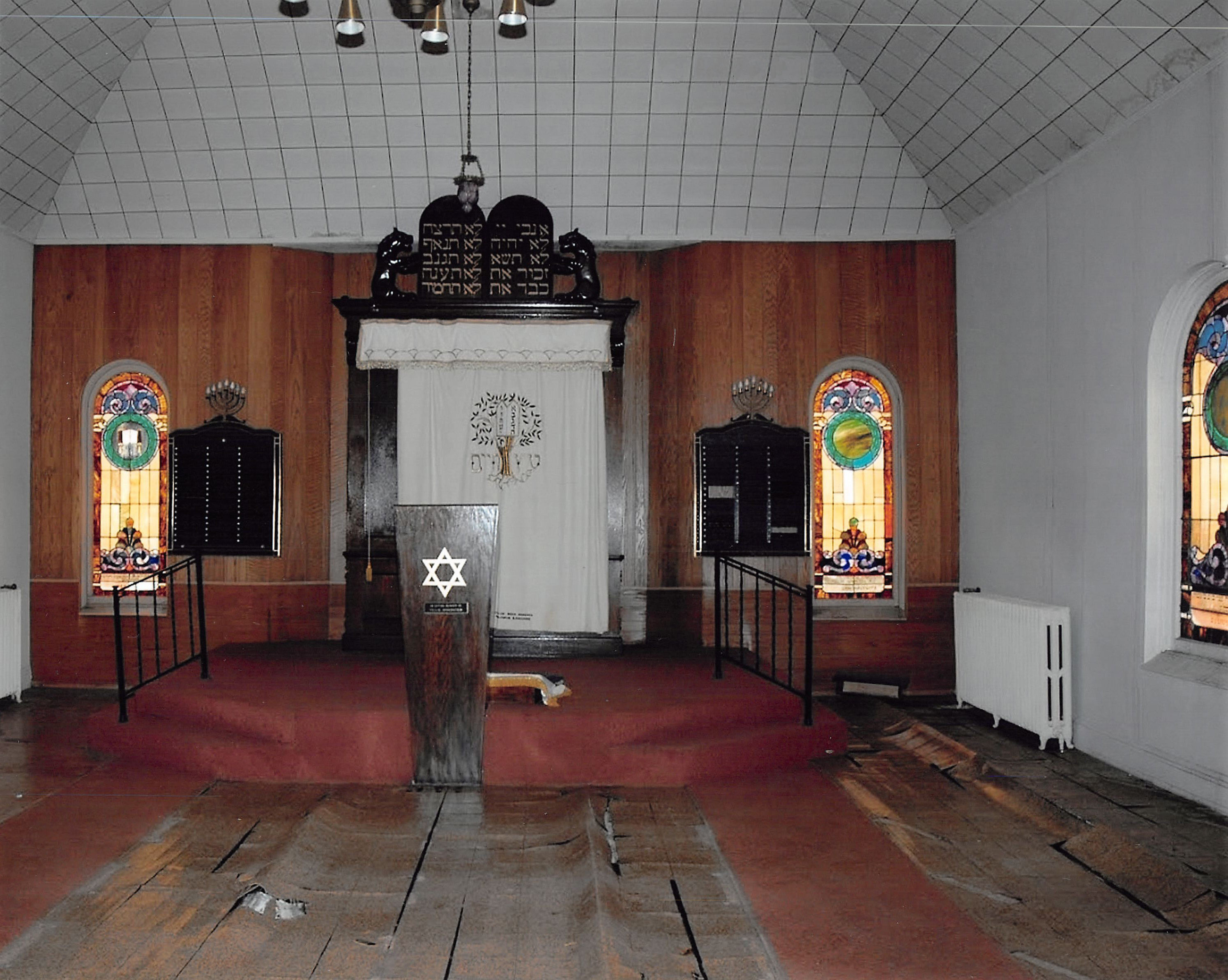
Interior before restoration

== See also ==
- List of synagogues in Minnesota
- National Register of Historic Places listings in St. Louis County, Minnesota
