= Magen Tzedek =

US certification for kosher food

Magen Tzedek, originally known as Hekhsher Tzedek, (Hebrew: מגן צדק English translation Shield of Justice or Justice Certification, with variant English spellings) is a complementary certification for kosher food produced in the United States in a way that meets Jewish Halakhic (legal) standards for workers, consumers, animals, and the environment, as understood by Conservative Judaism. Magen Tzedek certification is not a kashrut certification which certifies that food is kosher in that it meets certain requirements regarding ingredients of food and technical methods of animal slaughter, but an ethical certification complementary to conventional kosher certification.

Magen Tzedek was initiated by Conservative Rabbi Morris Allen and was launched in 2011. It is sponsored by the Rabbinical Assembly, the American association of Conservative rabbis, the United Synagogue of Conservative Judaism, the Central Conference of Reform Rabbis, and the Union for Reform Judaism. Magen Tzedek has met with harsh criticism from Orthodox Jewish rabbis and organizations. As of May 2013, no product bore the Magen Tzedek seal.

== Creation ==
Magen Tzedek certification was initiated by Conservative Rabbi Morris Allen of Beth Jacob Congregation in Mendota Heights, Minnesota in 2007 following investigative reporting by Nathaniel Popper in The Forward regarding working conditions at the Agriprocessors kosher meat plant in Postville, Iowa. After a five-member rabbinic and lay commission visited the plant over two days and spoke with owners, senior managers and about 60 current or former workers and had reviewed reports from the Minnesota Department of Labor and Industry, Allen stated, “We weren’t able to verify everything Popper wrote, but what we did find was equally painful and filled with indignities”.

In 2008, a commission was formed to develop and apply “a set of standards that would certify that kosher food manufacturers in the US operate according to Jewish ethics and social values”. On January 31, 2011, the Magen Tzedek Commission was founded as an Illinois not-for-profit corporation with seed funding from the Nathan Cummings Foundation, which reportedly has given grants totaling at least $245,000 to Magen Tzedek since 2008.

== Principles and standards ==
Magen Tzedek says it combines the rabbinic tradition of Torah with Jewish values of social justice, certifying that the kosher food product has been produced in keeping with Jewish ethics in the area of labor concerns, animal welfare, environmental impact, consumer issues and corporate integrity. According to Magen Tzedek, food production should comply with various Biblical and rabbinic commandments which are ignored by conventional certifying agencies. As outlined in a paper titled "Hekhsher Tzedek Al Pi Din", authored by Rabbi Avraham Reisner of the Rabbinical Assembly, these laws include:

- The Book of Deuteronomy has a prohibition known as Ona'ah: "You shall not abuse a needy and destitute laborer, whether a fellow countryman or a stranger" (Deut. 24:14–15)
- The Shulchan Arukh, in Choshen Mishpat 331:1, states that "one who hires employees should treat them in accordance with local custom" and that "when the custom was to provide their meals, he should provide their meals, to provide figs or dates or something similar, he should provide it — all in accordance with local custom." Reisner argues that this gives employers an obligation to fairly compensate workers including sick and vacation pay.
- Biblical law requires employers to provide for the health and safety of their workers, as seen from laws regarding one who leaves a pit uncovered (Exodus 21:33) or does not build a parapet on a roof that is in use (Deuteronomy 22:8).
- Tza'ar ba'alei chayim is a Biblical principle which prohibits causing unnecessary pain to animals.

According to Allen, it makes sense that the Conservative movement has taken the lead on the issue, as "Conservative Judaism is uniquely positioned. We are committed to kashrut, which some other movements might not be, and also committed to social justice. The hekhsher tzedek is that point where halachic intensity meets ethical imperative."

== Reception and criticism ==
The launching of Hekhsher and Magen Tzedek has been widely commented in the American Press. It has come under attack from Orthodox Jewish organizations and its representatives such as Rabbi Asher Zeilingold who was paid by Agriprocessors to oversee the plant and who had formerly collaborated with Allen, Rabbi Avi Shafran, director of public affairs of Agudath Israel of America, and the Satmar Hasidim. Agudath Israel of America has called the Magen Tzedek seal “a falsification of the Jewish religious heritage,” deploring it as an attempt “to redefine kashrut.” Those affiliated within Orthodox Judaism contend that it causes confusion about what is truly kosher, and criticize Magen Tzedek for allegedly downplaying kashrut by confusing it with social justice issues, claiming that it makes use of kashrut to follow secular political agendas. Shafran's criticism also includes the view that this certification is a stealthy way for the Conservative movement to enter the arena of kosher supervision making allowances for “contemporary society’s increasing approval of ‘alternate lifestyles’” in response to its loss of members.

Rabbi Menachem Genack, the chief kosher executive of the Orthodox Union, the largest kosher certifier in the United States told the New York Times: “The issues raised — workers’ rights, safety, environmental issues — are not mundane issues. The question is one of implementation. These issues are best dealt with within the mandate of other agencies — federal and state. We believe they’re handling it properly and have the expertise and the authority to handle it.” However, according to the Jewish Daily Forward, in an interview in 2013 with the Jewish Telegraphic Agency, Genack said that “If there is a company that wants to use Magen Tzedek, we will not object to it appearing on the label,” adding “we also would not object to them putting ‘halal’ on their label. These are marketing decisions the company makes on its own.”

The fact that Magen Tzedek limits its supervision to food and does not include other items has also been criticized, and questions have been raised about the employment policies of many Conservative congregations that do not follow the guidelines of Magen Tzedek for its own workers.

Magen Tzedek, described as “an organization that certifies kosher food to standards that meet or exceed best practices for the treatment of workers, animals, and the environment” was invited to participate in the U.S. Department of Agriculture's second Food and Justice Passover Seder in April 2012. But as of May 2013, not a single product bore their seal. Allen claimed that Magen Tzedek has come under attack “just because we come from a different part of the Jewish people.” But, according to the Forward, “that alone may not explain why Magen Tzedek has yet to gain any traction. The current standards include a plethora of specific requirements a company must fulfill to be certified as ethically kosher: categories and subcategories of labor practices, animal welfare conditions, consumer issues, and issues of corporate integrity, environmental impact, traceability of food supplies and record keeping.”
