= Tav HaYosher =

The Tav HaYosher is a certification mark offered, free of charge, to Kosher food establishments that meet a series of ethical criteria developed by the organization, Uri L'Tzedek. Particularly, the Tav HaYosher confirms that an eating establishment with its seal pays minimum wage to all employees and overtime to those employees working more than 40 hours a week. It also ensures the establishment offers employees appropriate breaks as required by law, and provides a safe and abuse-free working environment.

Traditional kosher certification agencies such as the Orthodox Union and Star-K offer kosher certification (known in Hebrew as a Hechsher), which confirms that the food meets the standards of kosher dietary law and can be eaten by those Jews who observe the laws of Kashrut. Many non-Jews purchase kosher food, believing that the kosher certification implies that the food was produced to meet a higher ethical standard all around, not just in terms of Jewish law (Halacha) and Kashrut. Many kosher consumers were shocked to discover that Agriprocessors, a kosher slaughterhouse and meat processor in Postville, Iowa, had been raided by Federal authorities on May 12, 2009, where U.S. Immigration and Customs Enforcement had discovered breaches ranging from fraud to defiance of child labor laws to immigration violations.

In 2009, the Tav HaYosher was announced by Uri L'Tzedek as the Orthodox Jewish community's response to these legal and ethical offenses. Each restaurant applying for the certificate is reviewed by one of 60 volunteers, who audit the company's ledgers and speak with workers to ensure that they are being treated fairly. The Tav HaYosher ensures that workers receive their rights according to federal and state law as well as ethical standards. After the free initial certification, inspectors visit each establishment unannounced every two to three months to verify continuing compliance.

In May 2009 five New York City restaurants carried Tav HaYosher seal and by January 2010, Tav HaYosher certification had been granted to over 70 dining establishments in Illinois, Maryland, New Jersey, New York, Pennsylvania, California, Ohio, Missouri, Texas, and Montreal. However, certification was sometimes met with controversy, as occurred on June 15, 2009, at Mike's Italian Kitchen and Mike’s Bistro. Businesses such as Noah's Ark, with locations in Manhattan and Teaneck, New Jersey, were covered by the Tav HaYosher, with owner Noam Sokolow remarking that he wanted his "restaurants to be on a level where everyone feels comfortable" and that Tav HaYosher offered a means "to have an additional agency supervising an aspect we feel is important." Sokolow stated that he had to make no changes in his business practices to meet the certification standards in any of his restaurants.
