= Ona'ah =

In general terms, ona'ah (Hebrew: אוֹנָאָה or Hebrew: הוֹנָאָה, lit. overreaching) refers to the Jewish laws surrounding monetary deception.

The word is used in modern Hebrew to describe fraud or embezzlement, while in halachic terms it describes unfair pricing.
