= Shavit =

Shavit (Hebrew: שביט, meaning comet) is a Hebrew surname and given name. Notable people with the name include:

== Surname ==
- Ari Shavit (born 1957), Israeli reporter and writer
- Bradley Shavit Artson (born 1959), American rabbi
- Dorit Shavit (born 1949), Israeli ambassador
- Edna Shavit (1935–2015), Israeli theater professor
- Ilan Shavit (born 1958), Israeli lawyer and entrepreneur
- Isaiah Shavitt, American chemist
- Nir Shavit, Israeli computer scientist
- Ori Shavit, Israeli writer
- Raz Shavit, Israeli football player
- Shabtai Shavit (1939–2023), Director of Mossad 1989–1996
- Sivan Shavit (born 1967), Israeli singer and actress
- Tzipi Shavit (born 1947), Israeli actress and entertainer
- Uriya Shavit (born 1975), Israeli author
- Yaacov Shavit (born 1944), Israeli professor
- Zohar Shavit (1951–2026), Israeli scholar, author and translator

== Given name ==
- Shavit Ben-Arie (born 1985), history writer
- Shavit Elimelech (born 1971), Israeli football player
- Shavit Kimchi (born 2002), Israeli tennis player
- Shavit Matias, Israeli international law and globalization expert
