= Jehuda Reinharz =

Israeli historian (born 1944)

- יהודה ריינהרץ
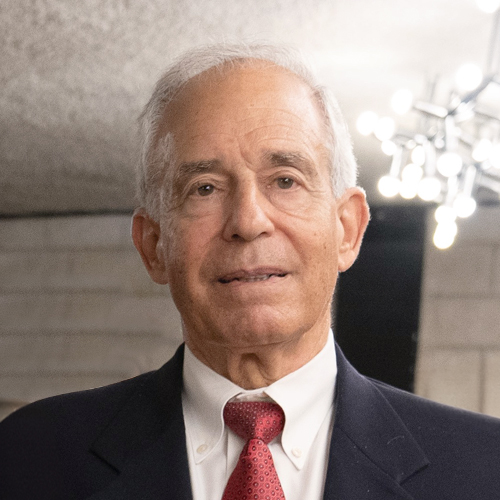

7th President of Brandeis University
- In office March 1994 – December 31, 2010
- Preceded by: Samuel O. Thier
- Succeeded by: Frederick M. Lawrence

Personal details
- Born: August 1, 1944 (age 81) Haifa, Palestine (now Israel)
- Spouse: Shulamit Reinharz
- Children: Yael and Naomi
- Education: Columbia University (BS); Jewish Theological Seminary of America (BRE); Harvard University (MA); Brandeis University (PhD)

Jehuda Reinharz (Hebrew: יהודה ריינהרץ; born August 1, 1944) served as President of Brandeis University from 1994–2010. He was the Richard Koret Professor of Modern Jewish History and Director of the Tauber Institute for the Study of European Jewry at Brandeis. He is the president and CEO of the Jack, Joseph and Morton Mandel Foundation. On September 25, 2009, Reinharz announced his retirement as President of Brandeis, but at the request of the Board of Trustees, he stayed on until a replacement could be hired. On January 1, 2011, Reinharz became president and CEO of the Jack, Joseph, and Morton Mandel Foundation.

== Biography ==
Jehuda Reinharz was born in Haifa in the British Mandate of Palestine, now the State of Israel. For three years (1958-1961), he attended high school in Essen, Germany, and moved with his family to the United States as a teenager in 1961. He completed his high school education in Newark, New Jersey. Reinharz earned concurrent bachelor's degrees: a Bachelor of Science (B.S) from Columbia University and a Bachelor of Religious Education (B.R.E) from the Jewish Theological Seminary of America. He earned his master's degree in medieval Jewish history from Harvard University in 1968 and his Ph.D. in modern Jewish history from Brandeis University in 1972.

His wife, Shulamit Reinharz, was the Jacob Potofsky Professor of Sociology at Brandeis University and founded and directed the Hadassah-Brandeis Institute and the Women's Studies Research Center. She retired from her professorship and directorship of the Institutes in 2017. They live in Brookline, Massachusetts. They have two adult daughters, Yael and Naomi.

== Academic career ==
In 1972, Reinharz became the first professor of Jewish history at the University of Michigan in Ann Arbor, where he created the interdisciplinary program that formed the basis for the University's Frankel Center for Judaic Studies. He became a full professor at the University of Michigan in 1980.

In 1982, he became the Richard Koret Professor of Modern Jewish History in the Department of Near Eastern and Judaic Studies at Brandeis University. Two years later, he was named Director of the Tauber Institute for the Study of European Jewry at Brandeis, and eight years later he founded the Jacob and Libby Goodman Institute for the Study of Zionism and Israel. From 1991 to 1994, Professor Reinharz served as Provost and Senior Vice President for Academic Affairs.

Reinharz was announced as the University's 7th president on March 2, 1994, succeeding Samuel O. Thier. During Reinharz's 17-year tenure, the university underwent major physical changes including the construction of the Village Residence Hall, Abraham Shapiro Academic Complex, Carl and Ruth Shapiro Campus Center, Carl Shapiro Science Center, Carl Shapiro Admissions Center, Mandel Center for the Humanities, Mandel Center for Studies in Jewish Education, and many other major capital improvements. He raised $1.2 billion during his presidency and quadrupled the endowment, from $194 million to $772 million.

Reinharz announced his resignation as President of Brandeis University at midnight on September 25, 2009, after serving the Brandeis community for seventeen years. He stayed on as President until a successor was selected and ready to assume office. On January 1, 2011, Reinharz was officially replaced by Frederick M. Lawrence, and on that date, he became president of the Mandel Foundation. Upon stepping down, he made a $5 million personal gift to Brandeis for scholarships and fellowships.

== Awards and recognition ==
Reinharz is twice the recipient of the President of Israel Prize, awarded by the Israeli Parliament (Knesset) in 1990 and 2024, in recognition of his scholarly publications. He was elected Fellow of the American Academy of Arts and Sciences in 1995 and a member of the Council on Foreign Relations in 1999. He twice received the National Endowment for the Humanities fellowship to enable him to pursue his research. He also received a Guggenheim Research Fellowship.

In 1998, Reinharz was appointed by President Bill Clinton to serve on the Presidential Advisory Commission on Holocaust Assets in the United States.

Reinharz is the recipient of honorary doctorates from Hebrew Union College, the Jewish Theological Seminary, Fairfield University, Ben Gurion University, Weizmann Institute of Science, Brandeis University, Hebrew College, Tel Aviv University and the Hebrew University in Jerusalem.

In 2017, Reinharz was elected chairman of the International Board of the Weizmann Institute in Israel and served until 2020. In 2024 he was elected as life member of the international Board. He also serves on many other Boards in the United States and Israel.

=== Other awards ===
- 1985 Present Tense/Joel H. Cavior Literary Award
- 1985 Kenneth B. Smilen Literary Award
- 1986 National Jewish Book Award
- 1988 Shazar Prize in History (Israel).
- 1990 First recipient of the President of Israel Prize awarded by the Knesset (Israeli parliament).
- 1992 Fellow of the Royal Historical Society (England).
- 1993 Fellow of the American Academy for Jewish Research.
- 1995 Fellow of the American Academy of Arts and Sciences.
- 1996 National Jewish Book Award in the Biography category for Chaim Weizmann, The Making of a Zionist Leader
- 1998 Spirit of Liberty Award presented by People for the American Way.
- 1999 Member of the Council on Foreign Relations.
- 2021 Yad Ben Zvi Award for the third volume of the Weizmann biography, “Founding Father”, co-authored with Professor Motti Golani.
- 2024 Leo Baeck Institute Medal.

== Published works ==
Reinharz is the author, co-author and editor of more than one hundred articles and 34 books in various languages. His The Jew in the Modern World, edited with Paul Mendes-Flohr, appeared in two expanded editions and is one of the most widely adopted college texts in modern Jewish history. His two-volume biography of Chaim Weizmann, the first President of Israel, has won many prizes in Israel and the United States. The third and final volume of the biography was written with Professor Motti Golani and appeared in Hebrew in 2021. Zionism and the Creation of a New Society, co-authored with the late Professor Ben Halpern, was published in 1998. Glorious, Accursed Europe, co-authored with Yaacov Shavit, was published in 2010. A full-length biography, Chaim Weizmann: A Biography, written with Motti Golani, appeared (in English) in 2024. The Blessed River, also co-authored with Yaacov Shavit, was published in 2024.

His latest books are published in Hebrew, English, and German. In October 2005 he co-edited with Shulamit Reinharz and Motti Golani the letters and documents relating to the life and times of Manya Shochat, a remarkable pioneer of the Second Aliyah. His book Israel in the Middle East, co-edited with Itamar Rabinovich, was published in 2008 (second edition); three books, Darwin and Some of His Kind (2009), The Scientific God (2011) and Window Unto the World (2017), were co-authored with Professor Yaacov Shavit. Reinharz co-wrote with Yaacov Shavit a book on the history of the donkey in literature, The Donkey: A Cultural History, which was published in 2014 in Hebrew. In 2013 Reinharz co-authored The Road to September 1939 with Yaacov Shavit (an English expanded version in 2018), as well as Die Sprache der Judenfeindschaft im 21. Jahrhundert, co-authored with Professor Monika Schwarz-Friesel (2013). An English translation appeared in January 2017 and is titled Inside the Antisemitic Mind. Together with Professors Aharon Barak and Yedidia Stern, he edited (in Hebrew and English) a volume on Israel as a Jewish and Democratic State, called A Jewish State: 75 Perspectives (2023).
