= Zohar Shavit =

Israeli scholar, author and translator (1951–2026)

- זהר שביט
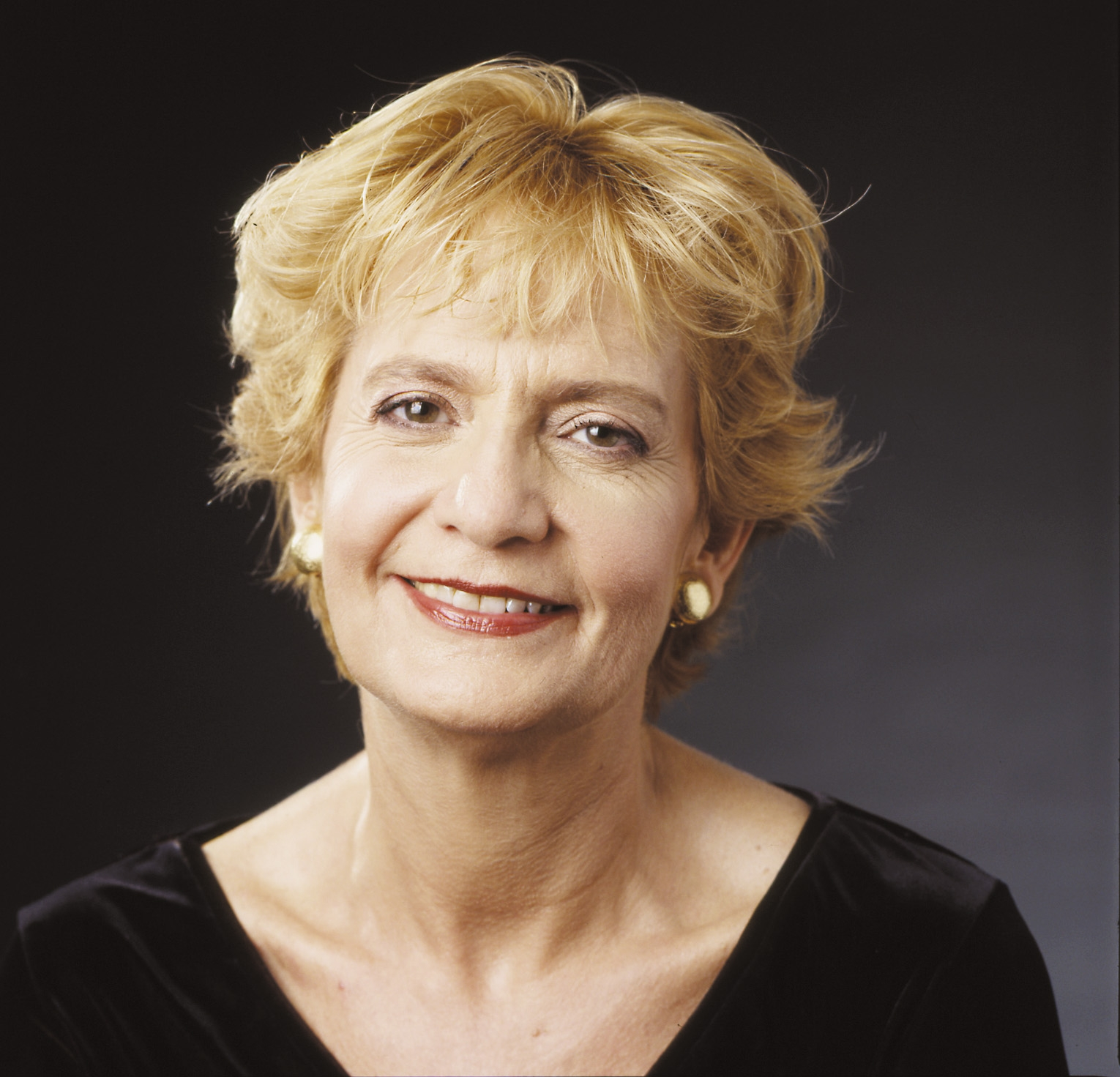
- Born: April 14, 1951; Jaffa, Israel
- Died: February 4, 2026 (aged 74)
- Scientific career
- Fields: Literature, Culture Studies, Children literature
- Workplaces: Tel Aviv University
- Doctoral advisor: Itamar Even-Zohar

Zohar Shavit (Hebrew: זהר שביט; April 14, 1951 – February 4, 2026) was an Israeli scholar, author and translator. She was a professor at Tel Aviv University’s School for Cultural Studies, and laureate of the Israel Prize in the field of Culture and Arts for 2025.

== Biography ==
Shavit was married to the historian, writer and fellow Tel Aviv University academic Yaacov Shavit. She was the mother of Noga, Uriya, and Avner. Shavit died on February 4, 2026, at the age of 74.

== Public career ==
In 2000, she was appointed a cultural affairs advisor to Matan Vilnai, the Minister of Science, Culture and Sport. She served as an advisor to the Knesset's education and cultural committee and was a member of the board of directors of the Second Television and Radio Authority, and a member of the New Council for Arts and Culture. She was a member of the council of the Israeli Opera and of the Board of Governors of literary prizes for the Ministry of Culture.

Shavit chaired as the Ministry of Science, Culture and Sport's Vision 2000 committee, which drafted and presented the Ministry's cultural program (Culture Charter – Vision 2000, Cultural Policy for the State of Israel in the 21st Century: Consensus Statement). She initiated the reading project of "A Book at every House" and chaired it for six years.

In 2009, Shavit was elected to Tel Aviv's city council, and appointed Cultural Affairs Advisor to Ron Huldai, the city's Mayor. In this capacity, she initiated several cultural projects, among which were changing the status of two archives: the Gnazim Archive and the Theater archive, which was made part of Beit Ariela – the municipal main library. She initiated the "Poetry on the Road" project in which passages of poetry were exhibited throughout the city on placards, banners and signs, including at bus stations, three of the city's boulevards and on city garbage trucks. In addition, she initiated a poetry writing competition.

In 2025, Shavit was announced as the laureate of the Israel Prize in the field of Culture and Arts.

== Academic career ==
Shavit was the founder and chair of the Master's Program in the Research of Child and Youth Culture at Tel Aviv University.

Her book The Construction of Hebrew Culture in the Jewish Yishuv in Eretz-Israel(1998) examined the cultural institutions in the context of the special status Hebrew culture enjoyed among the political and cultural leadership of the Yishuv.

Shavit's book Literary Life in Eretz Israel 1910-1933 (1982), which was based on hundreds of private letters and other archival materials, explores unknown chapters in transforming Eretz-Israel into the hegemonic center of Hebrew culture and described the inter-generational struggle over the governing literary norms.

Her book Poetics of Children's Literature (1986; a revised Hebrew version – Just Childhood 1996) examines children's literature in its cultural contexts, and presents a theoretical model of an a-priori multi-readership: the child as an official addressee, and the adult as an unofficial addressee whose function keeps changing historically. She also authored articles about the development of Hebrew children's literature and its function in the national renaissance of the Hebrew language as well as on Hebrew translations of prominent children's books by authors such as Erich Kästner and Mira Lobe.

From the mid-1980s, Shavit worked on the emergence of a new system of books for Jewish children in the German speaking areas since the last decades of the 18th century. The results of this comprehensive study were published as Deutsch-jüdische Kinder- und Jugendliteratur. Von der Haskalah bis 1945 (with Hans-Heino Ewers, 1996) and in Deutsch-Jüdische Kinder- und Jugendliteratur: Ein literaturgeschichtlicher Grundriss (2002, with Annegret Völpel). In these studies, Shavit described how these books served as agents of social change and their function in the construction of the children's Jewish identity.

She conducted a larger scale research on the republic of books of the Haskalah with Shmuel Feiner of Bar-Ilan University and Christoph Schulte of Potsdam University. The research focused on the various ways in which this new market was developed, organized, and monitored. A unique database with special software was developed especially for this research project and allowed for a unique broad analysis of the Haskalah books, of those involved in their creation, and of their readership. In 2014, together with Shmuel Feiner, Natalie Naimark-Goldberg, and Tal Kogman (eds.), she published The Library of the Haskalah [Hebrew], a socio-historical study of the republic of books of the Haskalah.

Between 2013 and 2019, she conducted together with Simone Lässig (Braunschweig, Washington) a comprehensive research project on Innovation through tradition? Approaching cultural transformations during the 'Sattelzeit' via Jewish educational media. This research project examined how various media for children and young adults participated in and activated significant reforms in the Jewish society. Her own individual research project analyzed several cases of cultural translation: the first addressed the attempt to present new forms of daily practices, or more precisely – a new habitus, to the Jewish public. With guidelines on daily practices including personal hygiene, dress, language, leisure, and interactions with one's surroundings, these texts reached not only children – their official readership – but the parents' generation as well. As a test case, she analyzed the translation into Hebrew of passages of Rousseau's Émile. The second project focused on the endeavor to present cultural models pertaining to Bürgertum and Bildung. She analyzed how David Samostz, the translator of Campe's Robinson der Jüngere, used his translation as a platform for illustrating typical scenarios of bourgeois families in which children are educated according to the principles of Philanthropinism. Samostz presented throughout his translation a model of bourgeois life and "staged" or dramatized various principles of philanthropic pedagogy.

A Past without a Shadow, [Hebrew, Avar Belo Tzel, 1999] her study of the construction of the past image in German books for children, was published by Routledge in 2005 and gained academic and public attention. This study described how books published in West Germany since 1945, which received glowing reviews and were awarded prestigious literary prizes, have constructed a “story” in which the horrors of the Third Reich have been systematically screened and filtered. The prevailing narrative for children failed to acknowledge German responsibility for the suffering caused by the German people during the Third Reich and the Holocaust. The construction of such a falsified past image resulted not from an attempt at Holocaust denial, but responded to the tacit demands of German society to participate in the creation of a wishful past image that gives expression to a conscious and unconscious code which existed at the heart of the West German narrative. This narrative focused on the German suffering, distinguished between the "Germans" and the "Nazis", and almost excluded the victims of the Final Solution from the past image and the collective memory.

From 2017, she conducted two research projects both dealing with the social history of the Hebrew language. The first one deals with "Hebraization" as a project of nation building. It grapples with the unreliability of official assessments of Hebrew's dominance, and identifies and examines a broad variety of less politicized sources, such as various regulatory, personal, and commercial documents of the period as well as recently conducted oral interviews. Together, these reveal a more complete – and more complex – portrait of the linguistic reality of the time.

The other research is based on her discovery of hitherto unknown archival material in the AIU archive in Paris. This project describes and accounts for the reasons behind Eliezer Ben-Yehuda's decision to change his original intention to write a practical Hebrew dictionary and to create instead his greatest opus – The Complete Dictionary of Ancient and Modern Hebrew as a scientific historical Dictionary.

== Published works ==
=== Books ===
- Literary Life in Eretz Israel 1910–1933. The Porter Institute for Poetics and Semiotics in Collaboration with Hakibutz-Hameuchad, Tel Aviv, 1982. [Hebrew]
- Poetics of Children's Literature. The University of Georgia Press, Athens and London, 1986. ISBN 9780820307909, 0820307904
- Die Darstellung des Dritten Reiches im Kinder- und Jugendbuch [The Presentation of the Third Reich in Books for Children]. with Malte Dahrendorf. Dipa, Frankfurt a/M., 1988. (German). ISBN 9783763801282, 3763801286
- Deutsch-jüdische Kinder- und Jugendliteratur von der Haskala bis 1945: Die deutsch- und hebräischsprachigen Schriften des deutschsprachigen Raums. Ein ... Handbuch in zwei Bänden [German-Jewish Literature for Children and Adolescents: From the Haskalah to 1945. The German and Hebrew Texts in the German Speaking Area. A Bibliographical Handboo] .With Hans-Heino Ewers, in Zusammenrbeit mit Ran HaCohen. Metzler Verlag: Stuttgart, 1996. (German). ISBN 9783476014214, 3476014215
- The Construction of the Hebrew Culture in the Jewish Yishuv in Eretz Israel. The Israel Academy of Sciences and the Bialik Institute, Jerusalem, 1998. [Hebrew]
- Deutsch-Jüdische Kinder- und Jugendliteratur. Ein literaturgeschichtlicher Grundriß. [German-Jewish Literature for Children and Adolescents: A Literary-Historical Outline] With Annegret Völpel. Metzler Verlag: Stuttgart Weimar 2002. (German). ISBN 9783476019363, 3476019365
- A Past Without Shadow: Constructing the Past in German Books for Children. Routledge: New York, 2005. ISBN 9781138799066, 1138799068
- The Library of the Haskalah. With Shmuel Feiner, Natalie Naimark-Goldberg and Tal Kogman. Am Oved: Tel Aviv, 2014. [Hebrew]
- Cultural Translation: The Maskilic use of translated texts as means of promoting social agenda. De Gruyter, 2025, 204 pp.

=== Translations ===
Shavit also translated several children's books into Hebrew, including E. B. White's Charlotte's Web, for which she received the "Hans Christian Andersen Certificate of Honor" for distinguished translation.

- Hugh Lofting. The Story of Doctor Dolittle. Masada: Tel Aviv, 1975.
- E. B. White. Stuart Little. Zmora Bitan Modan: Tel Aviv, 1977.
- E. B. White. Charlotte's Web. Zmora Bitan Modan: Tel Aviv, 1977. Revised translation 2007.
- Robert Lawson. Mr. Twigg's Mistake. Zmora Bitan Modan: Tel Aviv, 1978.
- Laura Ingalls Wilder. By the Shores of Silver Lake. Zmora Bitan Modan: Tel Aviv, 1982.
- Roald Dahl. Danny, the Champion of the World. Zmora Bitan: Tel Aviv, 1984.
- Myriam Harry. "La Colline du Printemps". In Les amants de Sion, Fayard: Paris, 164–177. [with Avner Shavit]. Haaretz, June 19, 2010
