= Frederick M. Lawrence =

American academic (born 1955)

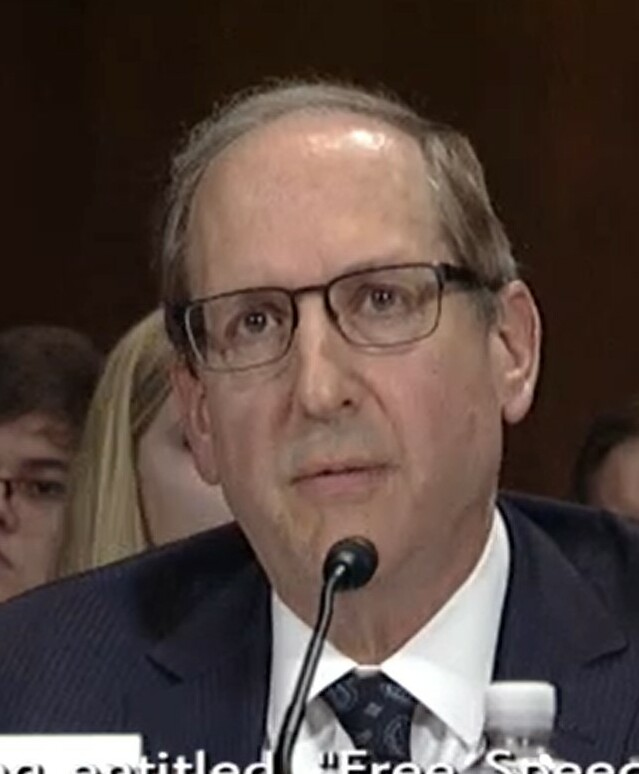
- Lawrence in 2017

10th CEO Phi Beta Kappa Society
- Incumbent
- Assumed office August 1, 2016
- Preceded by: John Churchill

Personal details
- Born: 1955 (age 70–71) Port Washington, New York, U.S.
- Spouse: Kathy Lawrence
- Education: Williams College (BA); Yale University (JD)

Frederick M. Lawrence (born 1955) is an American lawyer, civil rights scholar and 10th Secretary and CEO of Phi Beta Kappa society, the nation's first academic honor society, founded in 1776. Lawrence is a Distinguished Lecturer at the Georgetown Law Center, and has previously served as president of Brandeis University, Dean of the George Washington University Law School, and Visiting Professor and Senior Research Scholar at Yale Law School. He was elected to the American Philosophical Society in 2018 and the American Law Institute in 1999. Lawrence received the 2019 Ernest L. Boyer Award from the New American Colleges and Universities, and the Council of Colleges of Arts and Sciences’ Arts & Sciences Advocacy Award in 2018.

== Biography ==
Lawrence was born in Port Washington, New York. He is the son of an engineer, Joseph Lawrence, who worked on the Manhattan Project during World War II, and Beatrice Lawrence who chaired the English department at Port Washington High School (Paul D. Schreiber High School).

Lawrence graduated from Williams College Phi Beta Kappa and magna cum laude in 1977, winning the William Bradford Turner Prize, the college's highest honor, and then graduated from Yale Law School, where he was an editor of the Yale Law Journal in 1980.

He was elected to the American Philosophical Society in 2018.

Lawrence is married to Kathy Lawrence, an academic who specializes in 19th-century American literature. They have two children, Miriam and Noah.

== Career ==
Lawrence began his legal career in 1980 as clerk to Judge Amalya Lyle Kearse of the U.S. Court of Appeals for the Second Circuit. Later, Lawrence served as an assistant U.S. attorney for the Southern District of New York, where he became chief of the Civil Rights Unit. During that time Lawrence served under Rudolph W. Giuliani who was the United States Attorney.

In 1988, he joined the faculty of the Boston University School of Law, where he taught courses on civil rights enforcement, criminal law, and civil procedure. He also served as the school's associate dean for academic affairs from 1996 to 1999. Lawrence received BU's Metcalf Award for Excellence in Teaching, the university's highest teaching honor, in 1996.

Lawrence has been a senior visiting research fellow with the University College London Faculty of Laws and has studied bias crimes law in the United Kingdom through a Ford Foundation grant.

Lawrence sits on the Board of Directors of Beyond Conflict, an organization that has been working since 1992 to foster educated dialogue in order to clear the path for peace talks, national reconciliations, and transitions to democracy. Beyond Conflict has engaged in peace-seeking work in areas such as South Africa, Kosovo, Northern Ireland, Central America, and more. Under Lawrence's leadership on the board, the organization brings peace-making skills to appropriate leaders, those who are enemies to each other, and former combatants through three programs: geographic, thematic, and educational.

Lawrence also sits on the advisory board of RANE Network, helping to build the network dedicated to helping enterprises manage risk more effectively with improved tools, market insights, and collaboration. RANE's global network connects enterprises seeking risk management insights and services with thousands of leading risk experts around the globe. Its proprietary database and advisory service help enterprises find specialized risk experts across more than 200 categories of risk.

Lawrence has served on the national commission of the Anti-Defamation League since 2002 and from 2003 to 2006 chaired the National Legal Affairs committee of the ADL. He has co-authored numerous Supreme Court amicus curiae briefs, on behalf of the ADL and other civil rights organizations in such cases as Virginia v. Black (2003), involving the constitutionality of the Virginia cross-burning statute, and Elonis v. United States (2015), involving the definition of a "true threat" under federal law consistent with the First Amendment.

Lawrence was a trustee of his alma mater Williams College and has served on the board of directors for the Association of Independent Colleges and Universities in Massachusetts (AICUM), and the board of trustees of WGBH.

=== George Washington University Law School ===
From 2005 through 2010, Lawrence was Dean and Robert Kramer Research Professor of Law at the George Washington University Law School.

During his time as dean at George Washington University Law School, Lawrence was in charge of fundraising. He raised the endowment to support the tenured director of the Law Clinics and the new position of Associate Dean for Public Interest and Public Service Law, and the endowment for chairs, including those of International Legal Studies and Competition Law. Lawrence co-founded and has lectured at the Rajiv Gandhi School of Intellectual Property Law with the India Institute of Technology at Kharagpur. He created new Associate Dean positions for Intellectual Property Law and Environmental Law.

=== President of Brandeis University ===
Lawrence became the eighth president of Brandeis University on January 1, 2011, serving over five academic years. As president of Brandeis, Lawrence strengthened ties between the university and its alumni and focused on sustaining the university's historical commitment to educational access through financial aid. Shortly after taking office he launched a broad strategic planning process that engaged the entire university community. The plan, "Fulfilling the Promise," was endorsed by the Brandeis Board of Trustees in May 2013 and is being implemented by a broad range of participatory working groups. Lawrence supported student innovation including bVIEW (Brandeis Visions for Israel in an Evolving World), a conference by and for college students focused on future-oriented programming that depolarizes campus conversations about Israel, and ’Deis Impact, Brandeis’ annual student-run festival of social justice.

Lawrence's signature achievement upon arriving at Brandeis was to secure the Rose Art Museum, hiring its director Christopher Bedford and rebuilding its Board of Overseers. Before Lawrence's arrival, the Rose Art Museum was the subject of major controversy. Lawrence's predecessor had announced in 2009 plans to sell the Rose's art, a move largely criticized, especially as its legality was in question. In 2011, however, Lawrence settled a lawsuit stemming from that 2009 announcement; Lawrence announced that the university would not sell the Rose's art. At Lawrence's invitation, James Rosenquist, one of the original major artists to be exhibited at the Rose who had pledged never to re-enter the museum due to the controversy, returned to the Rose and spoke at the re-opening and rededication of the museum in 2011. Since then, the Rose has held many exhibitions such as "Dor Guez: 100 Steps to the Mediterranean" and "Image Machine: Andy Warhol & Photography," both in 2012; "Mika Rottenberg: The Production of Luck" and "John Altoon," both in 2014; and "Lisa Yuskavage: The Brood" in 2015. Ellsworth Kelly spoke at the Rose when he received an Honorary Degree from Brandeis in 2013.

Continuing the Rose's upward climb, in 2014 the museum announced that it would be partnering with the Tel Aviv Museum of Art to create a program that biannually selects emerging Israeli video artists to hold exhibitions at both museums. The joint project created the Chami Fruchter Video Prize, named for the wife of benefactor Lazar Fruchter. The award is given every two years to an Israeli video artist who has demonstrated considerable promise but has not yet been the subject of a solo museum exhibition. The winning artist receives $10,000 and their work is exhibited at both the Rose and the Tel Aviv Museum of Art.

Lawrence also championed making higher education more affordable. Through his fundraising and partnership-building, Lawrence brought Brandeis' commitment to financial aid to an all-time high. Lawrence launched the Catalyst Fund for Financial Aid, with $43 million in cash and pledges raised to date. The Catalyst Fund's monies are exclusively used to fund scholarships for undergraduate students and fellowships for graduate students.

"The Catalyst Fund is a bold statement of our belief that a Brandeis University education-open to all-truly changes the arc of young people's lives. As our alumni demonstrate, these individuals go on to change the world for the better in many large and small ways. Accessibility and affordability of higher education has been a core commitment of Brandeis since its founding."

He also re-built the pledge pipeline which included $10 million to support the Middle Eastern Studies Center, $5 million to support the Transition Year Program for students from disadvantaged backgrounds, $5 million to support the scholarship program for students from western region of the US and much more. He hosted multiple events per week at the President's House - which he moved from Newton to Waltham to allow students easier access - for students, faculty, staff, members of the community and visiting speakers and dignitaries. Lawrence also enhanced the international reputation and visibility of the university with events and programs in China, India, South Korea, Israel, Great Britain, Austria, and Italy. He increased fundraising from alumni and parents in China and India and co-founded with Jindal Global University (Delhi), the first Israel Studies Center in South Asia.

Other achievements made during his administration include raising more than $250 million, increasing applications by more than 35 percent to an all-time high, and largely eliminating a structural deficit in the university's finances. Under Lawrence's leadership the school's endowment increased by 32 percent to its highest level in the university's history. Lawrence is also credited with having initiated cutbacks and efficiencies that helped maintain Brandeis' financial rating at a Moody's Investor Services A1 rating.

In summarizing his presidency, Lawrence told the university community through email:

I am tremendously proud of the ways Brandeis has grown and thrived during my time as president. Applications have surged to an all-time high, our endowment has grown to its highest point ever, and we have made significant progress in balancing the University's budget.

During Lawrence's tenure, honorary degrees were awarded to a wide range of public figures. Among those honored - the cellist Yo-Yo Ma, the philanthropist Myra Kraft and the chef Yotam Ottolenghi. In 2014 Brandeis University withdrew an invitation for an honorary degree to Ayaan Hirsi Ali, sparking debate.

While Ali was not granted her honorary degree, she was invited to Brandeis' campus to speak with the student body "in a dialogue about these important issues," however, she did not accept the invitation. Yossi Klein Halevi wrote "Had the Jewish-affiliated university fulfilled its initial intention to honor Ali, it would have sent a message of contempt to its own Muslim students, to the Muslim American community and to Muslims around the world. And it would have worsened the already grievous state of Muslim-Jewish relations."

=== Secretary and CEO of The Phi Beta Kappa Society ===
Lawrence became the 10th Secretary and CEO of Phi Beta Kappa society in 2016. At Phi Beta Kappa, he focused on advocacy for the arts, humanities and sciences, championing free expression, free inquiry and academic freedom, and invigorating the Society's 290 chapters and nearly 50 alumni associations. He has testified before Congress on free speech on campus and has led Phi Beta Kappa's historic commitment to support for federal funding for the National Endowment for the Arts and Humanities. Lawrence has taken particular pride in supporting chapters that induct first-generation college students from underserved communities. In 2020, in the midst of the COVID-19 pandemic, he successfully launched the first Emergency Fund for Student Inductions, supporting students who were unable to afford their induction fee at universities whose own financial challenges precluded them from aiding these chapters. The Key Reporter,

== Views ==
In his career and personal life, Lawrence has been a strong advocate for free expression and civil rights enforcement, as well as fighting the Boycott, Divestment and Sanctions movement through dialogue, respect, and understanding.

=== Liberal Arts and Sciences and Higher Education ===
Lawrence is a strong advocate for the liberal arts and science education. He has argued that such education stems from the very missions of colleges and universities to create knowledge and transmit that knowledge through teaching and scholarship. Education is a public good, benefiting the entire society and must be supported by the society. [from The Key Reporter]

=== Free Expression on our campuses ===
Through numerous articles and speeches, Lawrence has articulated a theory that speech on campus is presumed to be protected, and that it may be restricted only when it involves an intent to threaten or disrupt the academic enterprise. In addition, he argues, university leaders must proactively seek to create a campus climate that protects robust free expression while maintaining an atmosphere of civility. As a guide for creating such a climate, and for promoting what he has called "vigorous civility," three principles provide a useful framework.

- Assume the best in each other and do not suspect the motives of those with whom we disagree.
- Disagree without delegitimization.
- Look for common ground even when we disagree and articulate that common ground as part of the discussion.

=== Civil Rights Enforcement ===
Lawrence is an advocate for strong bias crime legislation, expressing his belief that only by a legislative body stating through law that bias crimes are unacceptable can the disapproval of bias crimes truly be a societal disapproval. As to those who say that bias crime laws are merely symbolic and are not proved effective, Lawrence argues both that these laws have been highly effective and that the expressive value of the criminal law is important in its own right.

Lawrence also advocates for studying current bias crime laws as a way of gauging social perceptions of this multicultural society. Through this work, Lawrence believes society can learn about its biases and work to erase them to the extent possible.

On bias crimes, Lawrence wrote in a paper:

"The criminal justice system is an awkward tool and blunt instrument for making fine social policy but will unavoidably wind up dealing with issues that are related to social policy. We should thus not look to bias crime laws as a solution to the overall problem of discrimination in society. At best, bias crime laws will address only a small aspect of the problem. We must avoid the risk of focusing too narrowly on bias crimes and thereby failing to observe the true breadth and depth of bigotry in our society. Bigotry and intra-group animus is a serious and multi-tiered social illness, and it would be facile in the extreme to expect bias crime laws to cure this condition completely or even to address all of its aspects. Some commentators have warned that bias crime laws will keep us from seeing the full dimensions of racism and other forms of bigotry and may distract us from non-criminal cures such as civil anti-discrimination laws and education programs. However, criminal law enforcement in any field cannot address all aspects of social pathology and should not be looked to for that purpose. Bias crime law is no exception to this general observation."

=== Cultural Understanding and Opposition to BDS Movement ===
Lawrence, a supporter of peace and understanding regarding the Israel-Palestinian conflict, created the Brandeis Model while president at the university. Lawrence's solution to countering campus tensions on this issue is through authenticity, respect, and dialogue.

Lawrence supported building bridges across the community. He supported initiatives such as "Brandeis Bridges," in which Jewish students teamed up with a group of black students to work together on a yearly project and travel to Israel for a week.

In an interview with The Jerusalem Post, Lawrence explained that through personal experiences you can change one person and that changing one person at a time can have a significant impact. He said:

"Non-Jewish students and faculty, especially those from places like Turkey, Saudi Arabia, Egypt, or even Palestinians, are going to be in certain conversations. They’re going to be in certain rooms and they are going to hear things that people don’t say in front of me. And when they do hear those misconceptions, those people are going to say: ‘Well, that wasn’t my experience there. I went to Brandeis, I was at the president’s home, I met with Jewish students and that wasn’t my experience.'"

== Works ==
=== Books ===
- Lawrence has published one book, Punishing Hate: Bias Crimes Under American Law, published by Harvard University Press in 2002.
- Another is in development, The Rise of Campus Counsel: Higher Education and the Law, published by Princeton University Press (forthcoming)

=== Contributions ===
Lawrence frequently contributes op-eds to various news sources, such as The Boston Globe, the Observer, The Huffington Post, CNN, Fox News and CNN.com.

Lawrence has also contributed chapters and essays to various scholarly books and journals.

==== Book chapters ====
- "The Hate Crime Project and its Limitations: Evaluating the Societal Gains and Risk in Bias Crime Enforcement," in Social Consciousness in Legal Decision Making, Springer (2007)
- "Responding to Hate Crime" (editor of Volume 5 of Hate Crime: Issues and Perspectives) Praeger Press (2009)
- "Vigorous Civility: Aspirations for Free Expression on Campus," in Contemporary Issues In Higher Education Routledge Press (2019)

==== Articles ====
- "For the Love of Learning: Nonpartisan Advocacy and the Mission of the University," 105 Liberal Education No. 2, 44 (spring 2019)
- "The Contours of Free Expression on Campus: Free Speech, Academic Freedom, and Civility," 103 Liberal Education No. 2, 14 (spring 2017)
- "The Enduring Legacy of Louis D. Brandeis’s Free Expression Jurisprudence", 33 Touro Law Review 131 (2017) [anthologized in First Amendment Law Handbook 373 (R. Smolla, ed., Thomson Reuters (2017–18))].
- "Brandeis and the Essence of Community," 2 Brandeis University Law Journal 1 (2011)
- "Declaring Innocence: Use of the Declaratory Judgments to Vindicate the Wrongly Convicted." Boston University Public Interest Law Journal 18. (2009): 391.
- "Jack Friedenthal: a scholar, teacher and Dean's Dean." George Washington University Law Review 78. (2009): 3.
- "Responding to Hate Crime." Hate Crime: Issues and Perspectives. vol. 5 Praeger Press, 2009
- "The Evolving Federal Role in Bias Crime Law Enforcement and the Hate Crime Prevention Act of 2007." Stanford Journal of Law & Policy 251. (2008).
- "The Hate Crime Project and its Limitations: Evaluating the Societal Gains and Risk in Bias Crime Enforcement." Social Consciousness in Legal Decision Making. Springer, 2007
- "The Protocols of the Elders of Zion: group defamation trials in civil courts and the 'court' of public opinion." From the Protocols of the Eders of Zion to the Holocaust Denial Trials: Challenging the Media, Law and the Academy. Valentine Mitchell Publishers, 2007
- "Archibald Cox and the Genius of Our Institutions." Boston University Law Review 84. (2005).
- With Susan Gellman. "Agreeing to Agree: A Proponent and Opponent of Hate Crime Laws Reach for Agreement." Harvard Journal on Legislation 41 (2004): 421.
- "Enforcing Bias Crimes Laws Without Bias: Evaluating the Disproportionate Enforcement Critique." Journal of Law and Contemporary Problems 66. (2003): 49.
- "Hate Crimes." Encyclopedia of Crime and Justice. second ed. 2002.
- "Memory, Hate, and the Criminalization of Bias-Motivated-Violence."Breaking the Cycles of Hatred." Princeton University Press, 2002
- "Racial Violence on a 'Small Island': Bias Crime in a Multi-Cultural Society."The Hate Debate: Should Hate Be Punished as a Crime?. London: IJPR, 2002
- "Civil Rights Law In Transition (Symposium): Dialogue on Hate Crimes Legislation." Fordham Urban Law Journal 27. (2000): 1168.
- "Federal Bias Crime Law Symposium." Boston University Law Review 80 - Introduction (1185), Commentary (1437) (2000).
- "Hate Crimes: R.A.V. v. City of St. Paul, Wisconsin v. Mitchell."Encyclopedia of the American Constitution. supplement II vols. 2000.
- "Violence-Conducive Speech: Punishable Verbal Assault or Protected Political Speech?." Freedom of Speech and Incitement Against Democracy. Kluwer Law International, 2000
- "The Case for a Federal Bias Crime Law." National Black Law Journal 16. (1999): 144.
- "The Collision of Rights in Violence-Conducive Speech." Cardozo Law Review19. (1998): 1333.
- "The Limits of Domination." Boston University Law Review 76. (1996): 361.
- "The Punishment of Hate: Toward a Normative Theory of Bias-Motivated Crimes." Michigan Law Review 93. (1994): 320.
- "Civil Rights and Criminal Wrongs: The Mens Rea of Federal Civil Rights Crimes." Tulane Law Review 67. (1993): 2113.
- "The Hate Crimes/Hate Speech Paradox: Punishing Bias Crimes and Protecting Racist Speech." Notre Dame Law Review 68. (1993): 673.
- "The Coastwise Voyager and the First Amendment: The Fighting Faiths of the Abrams Five." Rev. of Fighting Faiths: The Abrams Case, The Supreme Court, and Free Speech, by Richard Polenberg. Boston University Law Review vol. 69 897.
- "Constitutional Interpretation and Halakhic Interpretation." Reconstructionist53. (1987): 15.
- "The First Amendment Right to Gather State-Held Information." Yale Law Journal 89. (1980): 923.
