= Yaacov Shavit =

Israeli academic

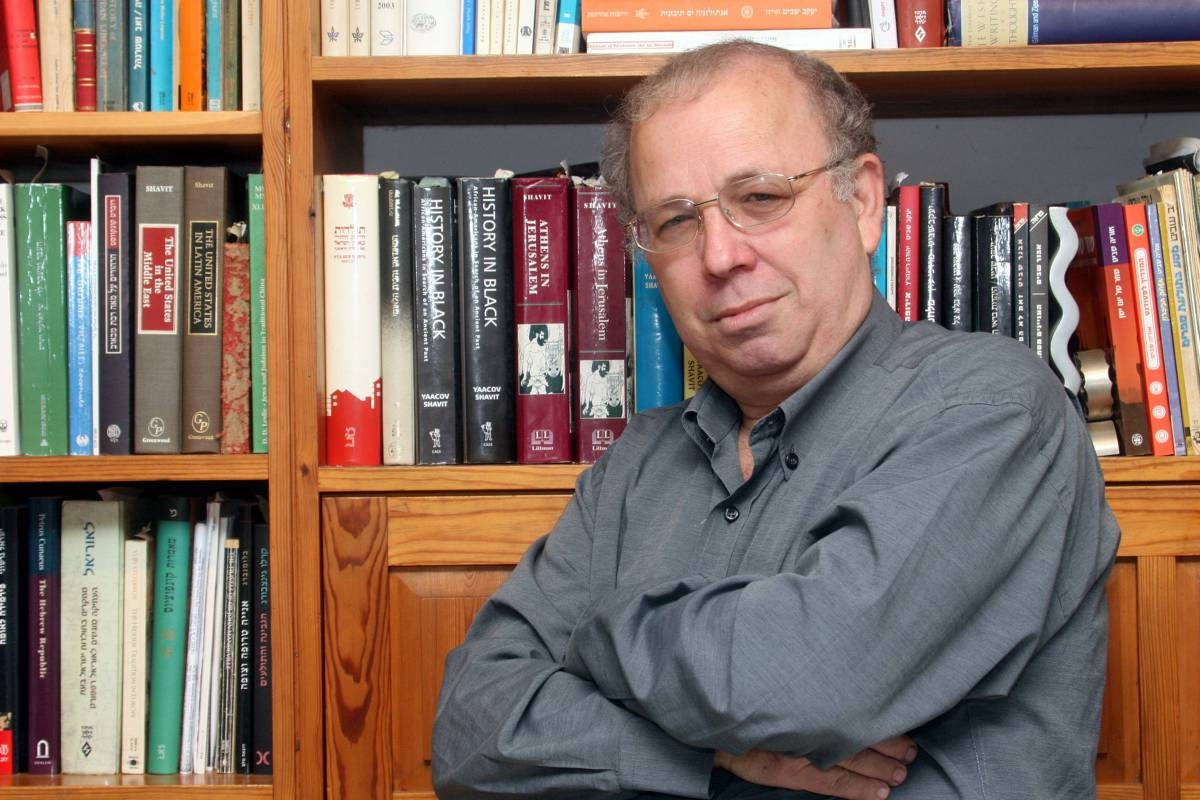

Yaacov Shavit (Hebrew: יעקב שביט; born 24 October 1944) is an emeritus professor at the Department of Jewish History, Tel Aviv University. His main fields of study are the history of modern Israel and modern Jewish intellectual and cultural history. Shavit has also written about the Afrocentrism movement in the African American community. He is married to Zohar Shavit, another academic of the same university's School for Cultural Studies.

== Published works ==
- 1987, The New Hebrew Nation: A Study in Israeli Heresy and Fantasy, Routledge, ISBN 978-0714633022.
- 1988, Jabotinsky and the Revisionist Movement, 1925-1948, Routledge, ISBN 978-0-7146-3325-1.
- 1997, with Chaya Naor, Niki Werner, Athens in Jerusalem: Classical Antiquity and Hellenism in the Making of the Modern Secular Jew, Oxford (Paperback edition, 1999, Taylor & Francis, ISBN 978-1874774365).
- 2001, History in Black: African Americans in Search of an Ancient Past, London., Routledge, ISBN 978-0714682167.
- 2006, with Jehuda Reinharz, Glorious, Accursed Europe: An Essay on the Jews, Europe and Western Culture, ISBN 978-1584658436.
- 2007, with Chaya Naor and Mordechai Eran, The Hebrew Bible Reborn: From Holy Scripture to the Book of Books, Berlin, Walter de Gruyter, ISBN 978-3110191417.
