= Ori Shavit =

Israeli writer and activist

- אורי שביט
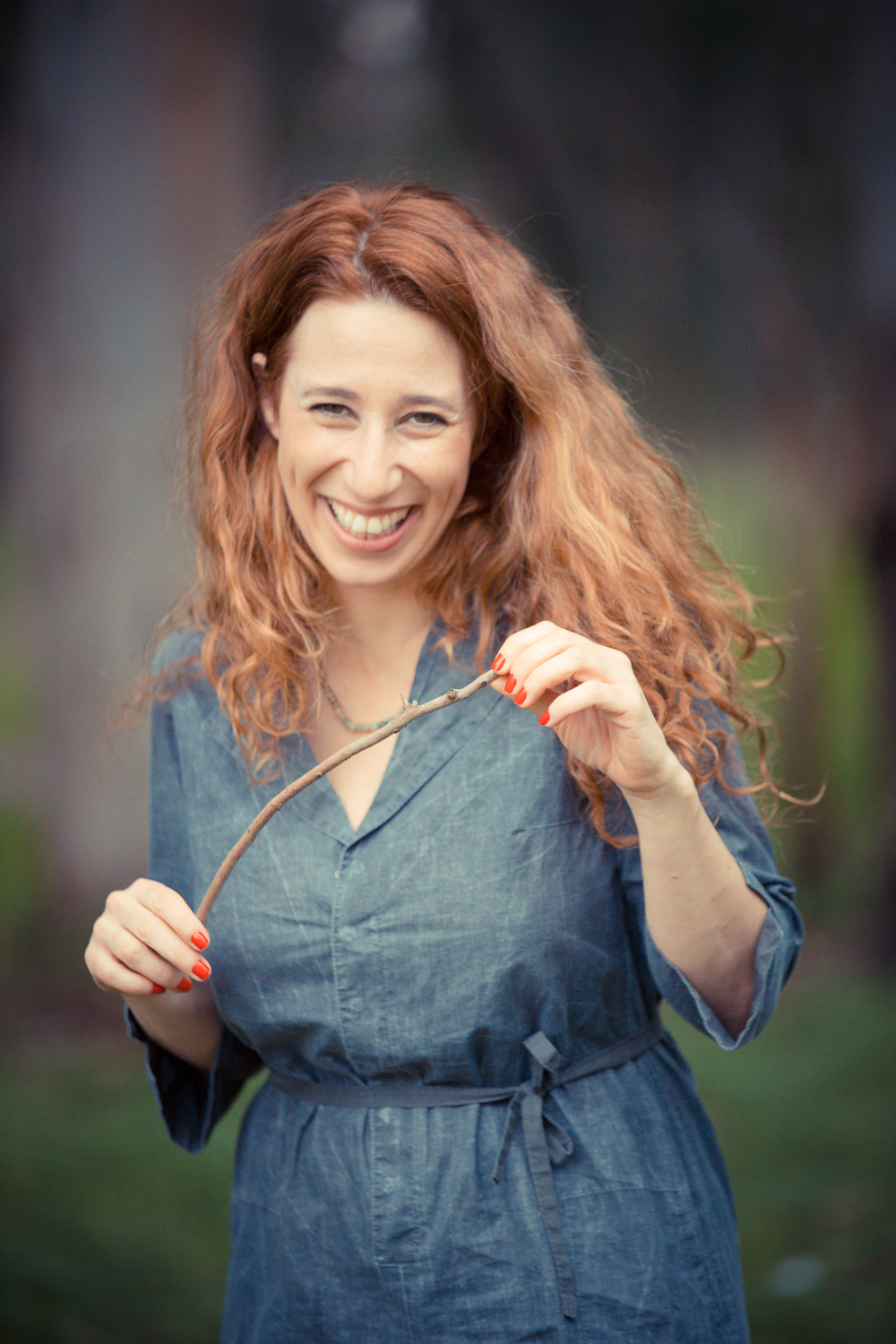
- Occupations: Activist, writer

Ori Shavit (Hebrew: אורי שביט) is an Israeli writer, journalist, blogger, restaurateur, restaurant critic, and animal rights activist. She runs a popular vegan food blog, "Vegan Girls Have More Fun." Shavit has been noted for her workshops and lectures on vegan cooking and her advocacy for animal rights and veganism.

== Career ==
Shavit studied professional cooking and baking at Bishulim: The Israeli Institute of Culinary Arts in Tel Aviv and began her career as a writer for the Israeli magazine "Al Ha-Shulchan" (On the Table). She committed to veganism after watching a presentation by Gary Yourofsky. Her blog was awarded the Best Food Blog award by Time Out Israel Magazine in 2013 and 2014.

Shavit has been noted for her successful efforts to get gourmet restaurants in Israel to include vegan dishes in their menus or to become fully vegan. She also founded a restaurant, Miss Kaplan, in Tel Aviv. Shavit's explanations of the rise of veganism in Israel have been widely quoted in the media.

Shavit has worked with the Jewish vegetarian organization Jewish Veg to create a vegan Birthright Israel trip and to teach Jewish students about veganism on United States college campuses.

From 2014 to 2018, Shavit served as chef at the Knesset on Israel's Animal Rights Day and prepared an all-vegan menu.

In 2014, Time Out Israel named Shavit one of the most influential people on the food and nightlife of Tel Aviv.

In 2015, she was named one of the 50 social heroes of the year by Yedioth Ahronoth.

In 2018 she published a cookbook, My Vegan Kitchen and in 2021 she published her second cookbook, Vegan Party.

== Personal life ==
She is the sister of the singer Sivan Shavit.
