= Sivan Shavit =

Israeli singer

- סיון שביט
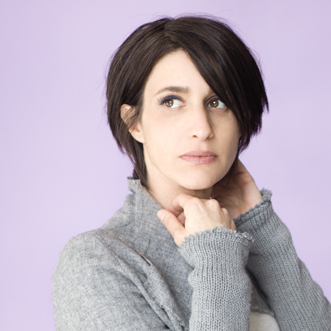
- Shavit in 2010
- Born: 12 December 1967 (age 58); Tel Aviv, Israel
- Education: Tel Aviv University
- Occupations: Singer; actress; voice artist
- Years active: 1989–present
- Relatives: Ori Shavit (sister)
- Musical career
- Genres: Pop; blues; rock
- Instrument: Vocals
- Label: Hed Arzi Music

Sivan Shavit (Hebrew: סיון שביט; born 12 December 1967) is an Israeli singer, actress and voice actress.

== Biography ==
Sivan Shavit is a singer of rock, blues and pop, grew up in Israel, graduated from "Thelma Yellin" in acting, studied film in the Department of Film and Television at Tel Aviv University.

In 1989 she began her musical career, when she formed a rock band called "Sivan", which included Jean-Jacques Goldberg, Amos Friedman and Ziv Goland, who was responsible for the melodies she wrote. The band has released a number of singles on the radio, including "The Biker" (based on the biker character from the movie Rumble Fish and released on the record "Mint Collection Number One"), "Dead Princesses" (which was later included in the collection of songs from the 1980s released in 1996), and other songs. Although she was in the midst of recording for a debut album, with an expressive rocky tone, Shavit chose to stop the process and create a new musical line for herself.

In February 1996, after seven years of collecting and searching, she released her debut album, "This Gray Blue", which was characterized by a melancholy atmosphere and strings. The lyrics were written by Shavit and the melodies are shared by her and Amir Zoref who produced a musical. Outstanding from the album were the theme song, "Kiss Me", and "Vardimon" which made Shavit one of the most played artists that year. The song "This Gray Blue" was filmed in a black-and-white film, directed by Tamar Karavan. The recordings of the album included a guitarist, Roi Shaked on drums, Ronen Shapira on piano, synthesizer, organ, and accordion, as well as other musicians.

Between 1996 and 2006, Shavit collaborated with many composers: she performed the song "Magic" on Amir Lev's album "Barbie Performance", collaborated with Assaf Amdursky and Yahli Sobol on the lyrics of Amdursky's song "15 Minutes", sang with Yossi in Blicky, "24 Hours a Day" from the album "December" (the soundtrack of the TV drama "Sherman in Winter"), she sang in the single "Superman" from Eshkol Nevo's book "Four Homes and Longing", appeared with Eviatar Banai in the intimate show "When We Kiss", sang in "A Herd of Bulls" from Banai's album "Trip Trip" and signed on to produce poetry on his album "Standing on Paper". In addition, she participated in the projects "Soon We Will Become a Song" by Galei Tzahal and "Songs in Full Light", and performed the song "You Fallen" from the project and the album "Thirty".

During those years she starred in two television dramas: in 1997 in "Grain on the Lashes" (from the series "Short Stories on Love"), and in 1999 in "As if nothing had happened". She also served as a narrator for cartoons and children's series, such as Inspector Gadget, Chicken Run and The Moomins.

In 2004, Shavit's song "Kiss Me" appeared in two main scenes in the successful film Walk on Water by Eytan Fox and Gal Uchovsky. In 2005, while in the final stages of working on her second album, the song "My Heart Has No Home" was chosen to be the theme song of the series "Love Hurts", starring Dana Modan and Assi Cohen. A clip for a song that combines scenes from the series directed by Uri Shitzer.

In 2006 Shavit released her second album, "Vanilla", which was recorded independently. The album is characterized by a more airy and less melancholy atmosphere than its predecessor. Shavit wrote all the songs on the album, and the melodies are shared by her and Amir Zoref, who also produced a musical. From the album, the songs "Flight Ticket" and "Who Are You Drinking Tears" stood out on the radio. A "video" directed by Oded Ben-Nun and Michal Berzis was filmed for "Flight Ticket". In the summer of 2007, more than a year after the release of the second album, Shavit released another clip from the album "Vanilla" to the song "Who Are You Drinking Tears". The clip takes place one night in a lonely cafe and envelops into it different variations and interpretations of the female sex, with all the characters in the clip symbolizing a particular saying or development of women at different periods in their lives.

In 2007, Shavit was nominated in the Singer of the Year category for 2006 at the Channel 24 "Ami" Awards Ceremony. For Yehudit Ravitz's album "A Small City" which was released that year, she wrote and composed the song "When Love Comes". Shavit also accompanied Didi Erez, who accompanies her as a guitarist in performances, in the song "Kol Mabat" from his album "Kol Mabat".

In June 2010, Shavit released her third album, "Melting Buildings". From the album, the songs stood out: "Looking to the Floor" and "The Next Step". Also on this album, Shavit wrote all the songs and composed them together with Amir Zoref. Oved Efrat participated in the arrangements, alongside Shavit and Zoref. Simultaneously with the release of the album, Shavit presented an exhibition of photography works at the 'Spaceship' gallery in Tel Aviv, some of the works appear on the cover and booklet of the album. That same year Shavit moved to Berlin with her partner, music producer, composer and guitarist Amir Zoref.

In 2012, Shavit released a video clip under her direction, for the song "Friday Dinner", from the album "Melting Buildings".

In April 2013, Shavit released the first song "Opening Balcony" and a video clip she directed, from her fourth album.

She is the sister of the journalist and animal rights activist Ori Shavit.
