= Uriya Shavit =

Israeli Professor (born 1975)

Uriya Shavit (Hebrew: אוריה שביט; born June 1975) is an Israeli author and Full Professor at Tel Aviv University (TAU). He specializes in research on Islamic law, theology, and politics in modern Islam, Muslim minorities in the West, processes of liberalization and democratization in the world, and the Haredi society in Israel.

Between 2016 and 2021, he headed the Department of Arabic and Islamic Studies and concurrently led the Religious Studies program at Tel Aviv University. Since 2021, he has been the head of the SDU-TAU Joint Institute for Jewish and Israel Studies. In 2022, he also became the Head of the Center for the Study of Contemporary European Jewry and the Irwin Cotler Institute for Democracy, Justice, and Human Rights.

Since 2022, Shavit has served as the editor-in-chief of the annual report on the state of antisemitism worldwide, published by the Center for Research on Contemporary European Jewryand the Irwin Cotler Institute for Democracy, Justice, and Human Rights at Tel Aviv University. The report has received extensive coverage in global media outlets.

In 2021, Shavit initiated an online course for basic Arabic language learning, made freely available to the entire Tel Aviv University community. Hundreds of faculty members and students participated in the course.

The book "Zionism in Arab Discourses" (co-authored with Dr. Ofir Winter) about approaches to Zionism in Arab thought was the first Hebrew book to be published in Arabic translation in the United Arab Emirates after the signing of the Abraham Accords.

Four of Shavit's children's books were selected for the Ministry of Education's "Book Parade."

Between 1997 and 2008, Shavit held various senior journalistic positions. He served as a foreign news editor and commentator at Haaretz newspaper, authored the columns "Atlas" and "Kaduri" in Haaretz's Friday edition, worked as an investigative journalist for Haaretz's magazine, and was the editor of the weekend supplements for Maariv and Makor Rishon. He also contributed book reviews for Yedioth Ahronoth.

== Biography ==
Uriya Shavit was born and raised in Tel Aviv. He served in an elite IDF intelligence unit and completed his undergraduate degree in Middle Eastern and Islamic Studies at Tel Aviv University, where he pursued a direct course of doctoral studies. His Ph.D. thesis, “Arab Regimes between the End of History and the Clash of Civilizations”, advised by Prof. Yosef Kostiner and Prof. Eyal Zisser of Tel Aviv University, was approved in 2005.

== Research ==
=== Islam and Democracy ===
Shavit studies the development of Islamic approaches to Western democracy and liberalism from the mid-19th century to the present. He explored the argument of Muslim theologians – especially those affiliated with the Muslim Brotherhood – that the origins of Western democracy trace back to the Quran and Western encounters with Islam, and that there is no contradiction between the “positive” elements of liberal democracy and Islamic norms. His studies emphasize that Islamist thinkers intentionally shy away from determining whether the ultimate authority in an Islamist democracy will be non-elected religious scholars or elected representatives of the people. Thus, according to Shavit, Islamist ideologists paved the way for a theocratic system that pretends to be democratic.

=== The Religious Law of Muslim Minorities ===
Shavit is one of the pioneers in the study of the religious law of Muslim minorities (fiqh al-aqalliyyat al-Muslima). His research in this field is based on the analysis of thousands of religio-legal decisions (fatwas), as well as on field studies conducted in dozens of mosques across Europe and the United States.

Shavit suggested that Arab-Sunni jurists have developed since the 1990s two main religio-juristic doctrines for Muslim minorities: The pragmatic wasati, led by the Egyptian Yusuf al-Qaradawi and advanced by the European Council for Fatwa and Research, and the dogmatic salafi, led by members of the Saudi religious establishment and their disciples. Both doctrines legitimize Muslim presence in Europe based on the hope that the Muslim migrants will Islamize the continent. Ironically, wasati missionary triumphalism legitimizes the suspension of prohibitions and promoted integration to European societies as a means of Islamizing the West.

Shavit’s studies in this field emphasize the centrality of the religio-legal mechanism of maslaha (safeguarding the primary objectives of the Lawgiver) in modern jurisprudence.

Shavit conducted field studies in dozens of European mosques, mainly in Germany, England, Sweden, France, and Iceland. He demonstrated the flexible ways in which Muslims, including salafis, negotiate fatwas, and the limited social impact the European Council for Fatwa and Research has had.

=== The Muslim Brotherhood's Historiography ===
Shavit’s studies on this topic stress the centrality of three historiographical concepts in the writings of Muslim Brotherhood affiliates, and their affinity to the worldview of the modernist-apologetic approach that developed mainly in Egypt in the late 19th and early 20th century:

- The perception that the origin of Western Renaissance traces back to Western encounters with Islam.
- The perception that since the 19th century, the West has been leading a “cultural attack” against the Arab World with the aim of eliminating Muslims’ faith so that Western Powers can dominate the Middle East without resorting to military force.
- The perception that the West is undergoing a continuous decline and that Islam will soon take over its hegemony.

=== Zionism in Arab Discourses ===
Shavit argued that a two-dimensional approach to Zionism has developed in Arab thought since the late 19th century: On the one hand, Zionism has been seen as an enemy, and its legitimacy has been rejected. On the other hand, Zionism has been viewed as a role-model. Shavit’s studies emphasized that Arab Islamists contextualized Zionist achievements to prove the need for an Islamic-based political order in Arab societies. Arab liberals, on the other hand, contextualized those achievements as a demonstration of the need for a liberal revolution.

Shavit also studied Islamic writings that draw comparisons between the past and present of Jews in Europe to that of Muslims.

=== Evolution Theory ===
Shavit studied approaches to Darwinism as a case study for the broader theme of scientific freedom in modern Islamic thought. He demonstrated that while in the late 19th century, early modernist-apologist authors did not see a contradiction between evolutionary theory and the Quran, the influence of American fundamentalists has led late 20th-century modernist-apologists to firmly reject Darwinism and describe it as a form of heresy and Western exceptionalism.

=== Generational Changes in the Leadership of the Arab World ===
Shavit studied the notions that generational changes in the leaderships of Syria, Bahrain, Jordan, Qatar, and Morocco in the late 20th century were the “dawn of a new era”. Based on an analysis of interviews and speeches, he argued that despite its reformist rhetoric, the new generation of leaders prioritized maintaining the status quo.

=== Theology of Migration ===
Together with Prof. Galia Sabar, Shavit comparatively analyzed theological writings legitimizing migration in religious terms. He pointed to similarities between Chabad’s justifications for the migration and the continued presence of its leadership in New York and the justifications given by contemporary Muslim theologians for the migration and continued presence of Muslims in Europe and the United States.

=== Violence and Political Legitimacy in Radical Islam ===
Several of Shavit’s studies examine attitudes to political violence in the doctrines of the Muslim Brotherhood and al-Qaeda. Shavit demonstrated the tremendous influence mainstream Saudi thought had on the development of Bin Laden’s ideology and operational modes. Shavit also demonstrated that the Muslim Brotherhood embraced throughout the 20th-century medieval juristic notions according to which it is permissible to use violence against an Islamic political authority only as a last resort and only if its overthrow is a-priori guaranteed.

=== Typologies of Migration ===
Shavit studied the influence of advanced media technologies on migrants in general and on Muslim migrants in particular. He argued that the internet and satellite television allow for the first time in history a separation between the territorial community and the imagined community and create new typologies of relations between migrants and their countries of origin. Shavit introduced the typology “passive trans-nationals”: people who intensely engage with the homeland through advanced media technologies without maintaining any physical transnational contacts. Shavit’s studies pointed to Islamic satellite TV channels and websites’ relative failure to create a “global imagined Islamic nation”.

=== Shari‘a and Sports ===
Shavit analyzed Islamic religio-legal approaches to sports and their reception by Muslim athletes in the West. He pointed out the opposing wasati and salafi views on the legitimacy of modern sports and demonstrated how, in many instances, Islamic law proves more flexible than sporting associations’ regulations. His studies on Germany’s first Islamic women-only gym and Muslim soccer teams in Germany informed that ethnic rather than religious affiliations are an important motivation for establishing seeming shari‘a-based enclaves.

=== The Israeli-Palestinian Conflict ===
Shavit studied the common notion according to which the Palestinians’ approach to the conflict has been consistently irrational and that they “did not miss any opportunity to miss an opportunity”. He suggested that this is not the case and argued that the Israeli-Palestinian conflict is particularly hard to resolve because of its “double-imbalanced” nature.

=== Islam in Iceland ===
Shavit studied the development of Islam in Iceland since the 1970s. He analyzed the rivalry between Reykjavik’s three mosques as a case-study for the dynamics that lead Muslim communities in the West to divide and split.

== Journalism ==
In 1997-2008, Shavit worked as a senior journalist for several Israeli newspapers. He was editor and international affairs analyst for “Haaretz”, a columnist for the Friday edition of “Haaretz”, senior staff writer for the weekend supplement of “Haaretz”, and chief editor of the weekend magazines of “Maariv” and “Makor Rishon”, where he was also a political columnist. He also contributed literary reviews for “Yediot Aharonot”.

== Public Engagements ==
Shavit is frequently interviewed in Israeli and international media about Middle Eastern and Islamic affairs. Since 2011, Shavit has organized the Winter Lecture Series at Tel Aviv University in cooperation with the “Friends of TAU” association. The revenues of these series are allocated to scholarships as well as Jewish-Arab social activities.

== Academic Books in English ==
- The New Imagined Community: Global Media and the Construction of National and Muslim Identities of Migrants (Liverpool University Press, 2009): Advanced media technologies – satellite technology and the Internet – have transformed immigrants’ relations with their departure and arrival societies. The first part of the book – “Imagining Nation States from Afar” – extends Benedict Anderson’s model of the nation as an imagined community. Discussion focuses on how immigrants can imagine their native national communities from afar, almost as if they never left their homelands. As a result, new typologies of migrants are created, such as the passive trans-national. A comprehensive analytic framework for the role of advanced media technologies in fostering relations between immigrants and their national communities of origin is presented. This section also explores, through biographical research with immigrants of diverse nationalities, the spectrum of responses imagination of national communities from afar invokes among different types of immigrants. The second part of the book – “Imagining the Muslim Nation State from Afar” – is an exploration of how Muslim-Arab theologians, envisioning the rise of a global Muslim nation, have developed a theory that tasks Muslims living in the West with specific duties within the framework of their anticipated global Muslim nation. These theologians and other advocates quickly discovered the merits of advanced media technologies in enhancing their vision of global Islam. Shavit’s field research was conducted with devout Muslim-Arabs in five mosques in Frankfurt am Main, Germany. It demonstrates how the proliferation of these global Muslim media plays a role in shaping the identity of Muslim immigrants. However, it also demonstrates that this role is limited and that an imagined global umma has not emerged and is unlikely to emerge.
- Islamism and the West: From “Cultural Attack” to “Missionary Migrant” (Routledge, 2014): The book analyzes Islamist conceptions of the West and Western-Muslim historical encounters. It explains how and why Islamists developed a theory according to which “the West” has engaged in a conspiracy to defeat Islam through a “cultural attack”, and why theories on the West’s imminent decline have proliferated in Islamist thought throughout the 20th century, and in particular in recent years.
- Shari‘a and Muslim Minorities: The Wasati and Salafi Approaches to Fiqh al-Aqalliyyat al-Muslima (Oxford University Press, 2015): Based on a comparative analysis of several hundred religio-juristic treatises and fatwas, the book offers the most systematic and comprehensive study to date of fiqh al aqalliyyat al-Muslima - the field in Islamic jurisprudence that treats issues that are unique to Muslims living in majority non-Muslim societies. The book argues that two main contesting approaches to fiqh al-aqalliyyat al-Muslima, the wasati and the salafi, have developed, in part dialectically. While both envision a future Islamizing of the West as a main justification for Muslim residence in the West, the wasati approach is pragmatic, facilitating, and integration-minded, whereas the salafi calls for strict application of religious norms and introversion. The book examines diverse and highly-debated juristic issues, including the permissibility of naturalizing in non-Muslim states, participating in their electoral systems and serving in their militaries and police forces; the permissibility of taking mortgages and student loans; the permissibility of congratulating Christians on Christmas or receiving Christmas bonuses; and the permissibility of working in professions that involve breaching of religio-legal prohibitions (e.g., serving pork). Discussions highlight the diversity within contemporary Islamic jurisprudence and introduce new nuances to highly-charged concepts such as proselytizing, integration, and multiculturalism.
- Zionism in Arab Discourses (Manchester University Press, 2016): A pioneering study about the Arab-Israeli conflict, this book surveys and analyzes hundreds of texts written by Islamists and Arab liberals from the late 19th century until the “Arab Spring”. It presents a groundbreaking thesis that Arab Islamists and liberals developed a dual approach toward the Zionist project – perceiving it as both an enemy and a source of inspiration. Shavit wrote this book together with Dr. Ofir Winter.
- Scientific and Political Freedom in Islam: A Critical Reading of the Modernist-Apologetic School (Routledge, 2017): The book discusses the philosophy of the modernist-apologetic school in Islam from the late 19th century to the early 21st century. It critically examines the fundamental assumptions of the founders of this school (Jamal al-Din al-Afghani, Muhammad Abduh, Muhammad Rashid Rida, and Abd al-Rahman al-Kawakibi) and their contemporary successors (including Muhammad al-Ghazali, Yusuf al-Qaradawi, and Muhammad Amara). The first assumption is that the core beliefs of Islam can be proven rationally. The second is that it is possible to accept the Quran and prophetic traditions as binding frameworks for all aspects of life while simultaneously maintaining full scientific and political freedoms akin to those in secular societies.The book highlights the refutations and contradictions inherent in these foundational assumptions through a discussion of the school’s writings on democracy and the theory of evolution, alongside other issues. It concludes that the conventional classifications of the school as either fundamentalist or liberal fail to capture its complexity and uniqueness.
- Shari'a and Life: Authority, Compromise, and Mission in European Mosques (University of Toronto Press, 2023): Based on five years of field research in mosques with pragmatic and dogmatic tendencies across Europe, involving hundreds of interviews and questionnaires, the book examines how Muslims living in Europe deal with religious-legal challenges, particularly those arising from being a minority in non-Muslim societies. The book analyzes the ways in which Muslims in Europe adopt, reject, reinterpret, or ignore religious rulings, as well as the strategies they employ, beyond the framework of religious discourse, to find pragmatic solutions. Among these strategies are: simple acknowledgment of sinning when necessary, the assertion that Sharia cannot be fully implemented in all aspects of life, and the claim that they do their utmost to minimize sin even when it cannot be completely avoided.The book demonstrates that there is a correlation between the degree of consensus regarding a particular religious ruling and its acceptance among believers, even when they are not well-versed in the ruling itself; that cases where a direct chain exists from posing a religious question, issuing a written ruling, and acting according to it are rare; that written rulings are often distorted or adapted during their social transmission and dissemination; and that, contrary to the rigid categories of written religious discourse, believers shift between pragmatic and dogmatic positions depending on their circumstances. The book also illustrates that the religious discourse justifying migration to Europe as a means of Islamizing the West has had little actual impact and that the "European Council for Fatwa and Research" has failed in its attempt to become the supreme religious authority for all Muslims in Europe. The book has been described as the most comprehensive research of its kind and a groundbreaking work in the sociology of Islamic law in Europe.
- Islamists in a Zionist Coalition: The Political and Religious Origins (Rutgers University Press, 2025): The book explores the decision made in 2021 by the United Arab List, the political arm of the Southern Branch of the Islamic Movement in Israel (SIM), to join the Israeli Zionist coalition for the first time, and specifically how and why it was possible for an Islamist movement to become the enabler of a Zionist government without losing the support of its religious scholars or political base. Through analyses of hundreds of books, columns, fatwas, media interviews, and posts on social media, as well as interviews conducted by the author with all the living leaders of the SIM and the United Arab List, Uriya Shavit demonstrates that the Islamic premises on which the SIM operates, rather than limit the party's flexibility, made it possible for the United Arab List to advance a pragmatic political agenda. This book argues that while the decision of the United Arab List to join a Zionist coalition led to dramatic consequences, it was grounded in decades of religious writings that prepared the ground for its legitimization, and aligned with a political orientation with which significant segments of the Arab population identified since the founding of the modern state of Israel.

== Academic Books in Hebrew ==
- A Dawn of an Old Era, 2003 (Keter): The book critically examines the assumption prevalent in Western media at the turn of the century that a new generation of Arab leaders and advanced media technologies will lead to the Middle East’s democratization.
- Democracy Wars: The West and the Arabs from the Collapse of Communism to the Iraq War, 2008 (Dayan Center): This book, partly based on Shavit’s Ph.D. dissertation, examines the polemic surrounding the universality of liberal democracy in Arab societies from the beginning of the 19th century until the Gulf War. It focuses on the anti-liberal discourses that emerged in Saudi Arabia and Syria following the collapse of communism in Eastern Europe.
- Demise of the West, Rise of Islam? Remarks on the Future of Civilization, 2010 (HaKibbutz HaMeuhad): This book is an edited volume exploring Arab writings about the imminent decline of the West.
- My Enemy, my Teacher: Zionism and Israel in the Doctrines of Islamists and Arab Liberals, 2013 (HaKibbutz HaMeuhad): This book is the Hebrew-language version of Zionism in Arab Discourses.
- The Jewish War, 2025 (Yediot Books): The book shatters the prevailing perception that the electoral struggle in Israel is primarily between "First Israel," Ashkenazi and left-leaning, and "Second Israel," Mizrahi and right-leaning. Instead, it argues that political preferences are shaped by voters' attitudes toward Judaism. The book contends that the failure to recognize the centrality of religiosity in the coalition formed by Begin in 1977, and the inseparable link between ultra-Orthodoxy and right-wing politics, is the main reason for the Israeli left's failures since then. It warns that the inevitable outcome of these failures will be the emergence of an ultra-Orthodox majority in Israel by the end of the 21st century and the dismantling of the Zionist project. According to the book, the key to the necessary political change in Israel lies in adopting a clear and positive definition of a non-Halakhic Jewish identity—one that does not disregard the spiritual dimension present in the lives of most secular and traditional Jews.

== Selected Academic Articles ==
- Al Qaedaʼs Saudi Roots, Middle East Quarterly, 13:4 (Fall 2006), pp. 3–13.
- The Arab Road to Democracy, Azure, No. 26 (Autumn 2006), pp. 30–62.
- Should Muslims Integrate into the West? Middle East Quarterly 14:4 (Fall 2007), pp. 13–21.
- Old Fears, New Threats, Azure, No. 30 (Autumn 2007), pp. 64–88.
- Sheikh Google: The Role of Advanced Media Technologies in Constructing the Identity of Muslim-Arab Germans, in Jose Brunner and Shai Lavi (eds.), Tel Aviver Jahrbuch für Deutsche Geschichte 37 Juden und Muslime in Deutschland (Munich: Wallstein Verlag), pp. 255–272.
- Muslim Strategies to Convert Western Christians, Middle East Quarterly, 16:2 (Spring 2009), pp. 3–14. With Frederic Wiesenbach.
- Is Shura a Muslim Form of Democracy? Roots and Systemization of a Polemic, Middle Eastern Studies, 46:3 (May 2010), pp. 349–374.
- Why are They So? The Ideology of Muslim Fundamentalists, in Thomas Kunze and Wolfgang Maier (eds.), Einundzwanzig: Jahrundertchanchen – Jahrundertgefahren (Berlin: Verlag Finckenstein & Salmuth), pp. 178–187 (in German).
- Sports in Contemporary Islamic Law, Islamic Law and Society, 18:2 (Spring 2011), pp. 250–280. With Ofir Winter.
- The Muslim Brotherhoodʼs Idea of Democracy, Azure 45 (Autumn 2011), pp. 29– 51.
- An 'Integrating Enclave': The Case of Al-Hayat, Germanyʼs First Islamic Fitness Center for Women in Cologne, Journal of Muslim Minority Affairs, 32:1 (April 2012), pp. 47–61. With Frederic Wiesenbach.
- The Wasati and Salafi Approaches to the Religious Law of Muslim Minorities, Islamic Law and Society, 20:4 (November 2012), pp. 416–457.
- The Polemic on al-wala' wal-bara' (Loyalty and Disavowal): Crystallization and Refutation of an Islamic Concept,” Journal of South Asian and Middle Eastern Studies, 36:3 (Spring 2013), pp. 24-49.
- Muslim Identity in Europe and Israel: Outline for a Comparative Research, in Eli Rekhess and Arik Rudnitzki (eds.), Muslim Minorities in non-Muslim Majority Countries: The Islamic Movement in Israel as a Test Case (Tel Aviv: Moshe Dayan Center, 2013), 23-29.
- Can Muslims Befriend Non-Muslims? Debating al-Wala’ wal-Bara’ in Theory and Practice, Islam and Christian-Muslim Relations, 25:1 (January 2014), pp. 67–88.
- A Religious Law for Muslims in the West: The European Council for Fatwa and Research and the Evolution of Fiqh al-Aqalliyyat al-Muslima, in Roberto Tottoli (ed.), Routledge Handbook of Islam in the West (London: Routledge, 2014), pp. 365–377. With Qadi Iyad Zahalka.
- The Post-Modern Reconstitution of Islamic Memory: The Case of Yusuf al-Qaradawi and the Virtual umma, in Itzchak Weisman, Mark Sedgwick and Ulrika Martensson (eds.) Islam and the Cultural Politics of Globalization (London: Ashgate, 2014), pp. 163–184.
- The Lesser of Two Evils: Islamic Law and the Emergence of a Broad Agreement on Muslim Participation in Western Political Systems, Contemporary Islam, 8:3 (September 2014), pp. 239–259.
- The Evolution of Darwin to a ‘Unique Christian Species’ in Modernist-Apologetic Arab-Islamic Thought, Islam and Christian-Muslim Relations, 26:1 (January 2015), pp. 17–32.
- Theology of Migration: Towards a Comparative Conceptualization, The Journal of Levantine Studies, 4:2 (Winter 2014), pp. 9–38. Primary author, with Galia Sabar et al.
- Zionism as Told By Rashid Rida, The Journal of Israeli History, 34:1 (January 2015), 23-44.
- The Muslim Brothers' Conception of Armed Insurrection against an Unjust Regime, Middle Eastern Studies, 51:4 (July 2015), pp. 610–617.
- Ramadan in Iceland: A Tale of Two Mosques, Islam and Christian–Muslim Relations (March 2016), pp. 1–21.
- Muslims are the New Jews' in the West: Reflections on Contemporary Parallelisms, Journal of Muslim Minority Affairs, 36:1 (March 2016), pp. 1–15'.
- Global Media and the Emergence of 'Lonely Sojourners' and 'Passive Transnationals', in Kei Martin and Lucia Kraemer (eds.), Post-Colonial Studies Meets Media Studies: A Critical Encounter (Bielefeld: Transcript Verlag, 2016), pp. 85–102.
- Raising Salafi Children in the West, Islam and Christian-Muslim Relations, 28:3 (2017), pp. 333–354.
- For Whom the Bell Tolls? Contesting Adhans in Majority non-Muslim Societies, Journal of Muslim Minority Affairs, 36:4 (2017), pp. 447–464. With Fabian Spengler.
- Embattled Minority in-Between Minorities: Analysis of British and German Salafi anti-Jihadi Campaigns, Journal of Arabic and Islamic Studies, 17 (2017), pp. 187–203.
- Does the European Council for Fatwa and Research Matter? The Case of Muslims in Dortmund, Germany, Journal of Politics, Religion and Ideology, 18:4 (2017), pp. 363–382. With Fabian Spengler.
- The Failures of the Israeli-Palestinian Peace Process: Balance and Imbalance, The Journal for Interdisciplinary Middle Eastern Studies, 1:2 (Spring 2018), pp. 5–24.
- Europe, the New Abyssinia: On the Role of the First Hijra in Fiqh al-Aqalliyyat al-Muslima Discourse, Islam and Christian-Muslim Relations, 29:3 (2018), pp. 371–391.
- 'There's Shari‘a and there's Life: a Field Study on the Diffusion, Acceptance and Rejection of Fiqh al-Aqalliyyat al-Muslima at Reykjavik's Grand Mosque, Journal of Muslim Minority Affairs, 38:3 (2018), pp. 338–359. With Fabian Spengler.
- Can the Metaphysical be Rationally Proven? Islamic Modernism Revisited, in Gert Melville and Carlos Ruta (eds.), Experiencing the Beyond (Berlin: De Gruyter, 2018), pp. 229–242.
- Being a Muslim Football Player in Europe, Soccer and Society, 20:2 (2019), pp. 271–287.
- A Fatwa and Its Dialectics: Contextualizing the Permissibility of Mortgages in Stockholm, Journal of Muslims in Europe, 8:3 (May 2019), pp. 335–358.
- How Radical is Birmingham’s Salafi Mosque?, Democracy and Security, 17:1 (January 2021), pp. 80–107. With Fabian Spengler.
- Converting to Salafiyya: Non-Muslims Path to the ‘Saved Sect’, Journal of Muslim Minority Affairs 41:2 (2022), pp. 337-354. With Fabian Spengler.
- The European Council for Fatwa and Research and the Evolution of Fiqh al-Aqalliyyat al-Muslima, in Roberto Tottoli (ed.), Routledge Handbook of Islam in the West, Second Edition (London: Routledge, 2022).
- Enemy of the State: An Annotated Interview with Rabbi Israel Meir Hirsch, Jewish Studies 21 (2023), pp. 128-143.
- Islamists in a Zionist Coalition: The Political and Religious Origins, Politics, Religion and Ideology 24:2 (2023), pp. 176-199.

== Fiction Books ==
- The Dead Man: A best-selling philosophical novel (Keter Publishers, 2013) about Barak Lavie, a lawyer and failed businessman whose marriage is falling apart. He returns to Tel Aviv from a business trip to England and discovers that he is dead. His surreal struggle for survival in his hometown’s snowy streets provides him with an opportunity to re-invent himself. The book won critical acclaim.
- Meat: The book (Yediot Aharonot, 2019) includes two novels. “Meat” is set in Israel in the late 21st century, where the slaughter of animals had been outlawed. A grandmother and her granddaughter travel to an underground carnivorous society, where their journey takes a tragic turn. The second novel, “The Perfect Murder”, recounts the story of a business manager who is dismissed from his job as a marketing director and plans the ultimate vengeance against his former flamboyant and arrogant employer. The book earned critical acclaim and stirred a public debate about the future of the vegetarian movement.
- Veronica: The book (Pardes, The Big Meadows series, 2021) tells about 40-year-old Omri, the son of a Mossad agent, who studied in a German high school. He receives a letter from his first girlfriend, Argentinian-German Veronica. More than twenty years after she abandoned him in haste and returned to Argentina, she asks him to meet with her urgently in Frankfurt.

== Books for Young Readers ==
Shavit authored six books for young readers: Memory Game (2002), Danny and Krembo (2007), The Boy Who Read Minds (2010), Like Magic (2012), The Third Wish (2017), and My Grandmother, the Witch (2020). Four of his books, published by HaKibbutz HaMeuhad, were selected for the Israeli Education Ministry’s annual “Book Parade”.

== Guidebooks ==
Shavit authored “The Guide for University Student”, a guidebook for students that introduces study methods for exams, writing papers, locating books in academic libraries and choosing courses. The guide also includes advice on how to write a CV, master job interviews, and negotiate rent contracts. Since it was first published, the guide has sold some 20,000 copies.
