= Timeline of Animal Liberation Front actions =

This timeline of Animal Liberation Front (ALF) actions describes the history, consequences and theory of direct action on behalf of animals by animal liberation activists using, or associated with the ALF.

From the ALF's formation in 1976 to the present day the direct actions have included two distinct categories of tactics, with activists often using both tactics together;

- The removal of animals from laboratories, and/or releasing them from fur farms, and other animal-based industries.
- The sabotage of animal-based industries, such as; slaughterhouses, butchers, farms, circuses, greyhound stadiums, and pet shops, or businesses involved in (or with) animal testing organizations, using tactics such as; vandalism, arson, intimidation, incendiary devices and hoax bombs.

== 1970s ==
1976

- Two years after Ronnie Lee and Cliff Goodman had been charged for the raid on the Oxford Laboratory Animal Colonies in Bicester, as part of the Band of Mercy, the "Bicester Two" as they were known; Lee emerges even more militant than before. There had been daily demonstrations at the court during their trial, including Lee's local Labour MP Ivor Clemitson. He then collects the remaining activists from the Band of Mercy upon his release, including another two dozen new willing activists, 30 in all, and the Animal Liberation Front is born.
- It was reported that in early operations by the ALF, individuals targeted slaughterhouses, furriers, butcher shops, circuses, breeders, and fast-food restaurants, causing £250,000 in the first year alone.
- The first recorded fur farm raid released 1,000 foxes from Dalchonzie fur farm in Scotland.

1977

- After the ALF causes $80,000 in damages at Condiltox Laboratories, in London, England, the company closes. It is claimed as a victory for direct action by the ALF.

1977

- One of the first ALF actions in the Netherlands is reported, with activists removing hens from an intensive farming unit in Eindoven.

1979

- A cat, two dogs, and two guinea pigs are taken from New York University Medical Center, the first ALF raid in the United States.

== 1980s ==
=== 1981 ===
September

In Monkey Business, by Kathy Snow Guillermo, she writes that the first ALF action in the United States was the removal of the so-called Silver Spring monkeys, who were, after the rescue, cared for by the People for the Ethical Treatment of Animals (PETA) in a safe house. They were kept there after a researcher from the Institute of Behavioral Research in Silver Spring, Maryland, had blatantly acted in violation of the animal cruelty legislation for laboratory practice. The animals were then returned five days later, after learning that legal action against the researcher could not proceed without the monkeys.

=== 1982 ===
24 December

The president of PETA, Ingrid Newkirk, writes that an activist codenamed "Valerie" flew to England, after the publicity triggered by the Silver Spring monkeys case. She was directed by Ronnie Lee to a training camp for activists, who at the time was working for the BUAV, before returning to Maryland and breaking into Howard University. Twenty-four cats were removed by the ALF cell she had founded, with some of the cats suffering from back legs that were crippled.

=== 1984 ===
28 May

The Head Injury Lab of the University of Pennsylvania is raided by the ALF with $60,000 worth of damage caused, and 60 hours worth of video tapes stolen which shows researchers laughing and joking as they cause brain damage to baboons. PETA then released the documentary Unnecessary Fuss, causing the chief veterinarian to lose his job.

9 December

The City of Hope National Medical Center is raided by the ALF totaling $400,000 in costs.

=== 1985 ===
20 April

Sixteen ALF activists take 468 animals, including a five-week-old macaque named Britches, after raiding the University of California, and cause $700,000 in damages. After the raid, which the ALF filmed, eight of the seventeen projects involving the use of animals at the laboratory, which were currently going on, were stopped, because of the footage. The university said "years of medical research were lost".

=== 1986 ===
26 October

The University of Oregon laboratory is attacked in Eugene with $120,000 worth of damage.

23 December

A bomb package inside a Binns department store was discovered in Newcastle-upon-Tyne city centre in England. The area was evacuated and a bomb disposal team defused the device. A woman claiming to be from the ALF claimed responsibility in a telephone call to Metro Radio, with the intention to damage the store in protest against Binns selling animal fur.

=== 1987 ===
15 April

Two years and two weeks after 500 animals were taken from the University of California, an ALF arson is claimed at the Animal Diagnostics Laboratory, causing $5.1 million, one of the largest and most costly actions yet for the movement.

28 November

"ALF" and "murderers" is spray-painted at V. Melani, which is set on fire causing $200,000 in damages. The company are a poultry distribution company in Santa Clara, California.

=== 1989 ===
April

- On the 2nd, one of the laboratories at the Veterans Administration hospital is set on fire, a part of the University of Arizona, causing $500,000 worth of damage.
- Timed incendiary devices are left at a meat company on 13 April, the ALF claim the fire.

4 July

Equipment, computer and records are smashed after the ALF raid Texas Tech University, with an estimated $700,000 in damages.

== 1990s ==
=== 1990 ===
17 March

Harlan Interfauna is raided by Keith Mann, Barry Horne and Danny Attwood, as part of a small ALF cell. The activists entered the animal units through holes they punched in the roof, removing 82 beagle puppies and 26 rabbits. They also removed documents listing Interfauna's customers, which included Boots, Glaxo, Beechams, and Huntingdon Research Centre, as well as a number of universities. A vet who was an ALF supporter removed the tattoos from the dogs' ears, and they were dispersed to new homes across the UK. As a result of evidence found at the scene and in one of the activists' homes, Mann and Attwood were convicted of conspiracy to burgle and were sentenced to nine months and 18 months respectively.

=== 1991 ===
10 June

Rod Coronado, and the ALF, raid Oregon State University and set timed incendiary devices in building, with $62,000 in damage done to the experimental mink farm.

15 December

A mink pelt drying company, Hynek Malecky facility, is set fire by the ALF, with costs estimated at $96,000. The raid is claimed as the ALF and Rod Coronado is later charged with the arson. Files and videotapes recording the research were lost, and the attack led to the closure of the program.

=== 1992 ===
28 February

Another mink research facility is attacked, Michigan State University, again another arson, this time causing substantially more damage at the cost of $1.2 million. Rod Coronado was charged with the attack, with PETA donating $42,000 towards his legal defense. Experimental data spanning thirty-two years were lost. An extensive autobiographical account can be found in the book Recipes for Disaster: An Anarchist Cookbook, which details the materials, methodology, and tactics needed to carry out such an attack and other forms of direct action.

=== 1995 ===
January

In Henrietta, New York, two trucks belonging to Conti Packing Co are set on fire by the ALF.

14 April

The ALF use an incendiary device, causing $6,000 in damages at Oneata Beef Company, Syracuse, New York.

15 June

Tandy Leather, in Utah is set on fire causing $300,000 in damage, the action is claimed by the ALF.

24 December

Three Dutch Girl Ice Cream trucks in Eugene, Oregon, have incendiary devices placed under them by the ALF, costing $15,600.

=== 1996 ===
2 April

An Egg Products store in Salt Lake City is burned to the ground, with also the ALF destroying two trucks that were owned by the company. The damage totaled $100,000.

October

- In Detroit, Oregon, 27th, a U.S. Forest Service truck is set on fire. The claim is a joint one by the ALF and the Earth Liberation Front (ELF), a similar movement who formed in 1992.
- Three days later, a U.S. Forest Service Oakridge Ranger Station is burned down in Eugene, Oregon, causing $5.3 million, also claimed by both the ELF and the ALF.

12 November

The ALF claim that they have thrown a firebomb through the window of the Alaskan Fur Company, in Bloomington, Minnesota, the damages is estimated at over $2 million.

=== 1997 ===
15 February

Butyric acid is left in a McDonald's by the ALF, a chemical that leaves a foul smell, and also "McShit, McMurder, McDeath" is spraypainted on the walls of the bathroom in Michigan.

March

- Another joint claim by the ALF and the ELF of a series of firebombings on 11 March, destroying the offices of the Agricultural Fur Breeders Co-Op and four trucks, in Utah, costing an estimated $1 million.
- Three days later, the "Animal Liberation Front – Eco-Animal Defense Unit" claim the spiking of 47 trees in a clearcut area, Oregon. The action is also claimed by the ALF and the ELF.
- On the 18th, nearly ten years after the $5.1 million arson at the University of California by the ALF, the "Bay Area Cell of the Earth and Animal Liberation Front" set fire to the Center for Comparative Medicine facility, which was under construction at the time.
- On the same day, Montgomery Furs is torched by the ALF, the store is a trapping supply firm in Utah.

19 April

In Indiana, the ALF set fire to a truck belonging to Archer's Meats.

21 July

A napalm is used by the ALF and ELF against Cavel West, a horse slaughtering abattoir based in Oregon, calling the device "vegan Jell-o". The plant is reported destroyed.

August

- On the 16th, in Utah, a McDonald's restaurant is completely burned to the ground by four ALF activists, totaling $400,000 worth of damage in total.
- The very next day, two Molotov cocktails are thrown through the window of Cosmo's Furs, in Illinois, claimed by the ALF.
- Only a couple of days later, on 19 August, the Wildlife Pharmaceuticals in, Colorado, is set on fire by the ALF.
- Several trucks are set on fire belonging to Jersey Cuts Meat Co, in New Jersey, on the 26th, with the ALF claiming responsibility. Three of the trucks are completely destroyed, each costing $60,000.

=== 1998 ===
28 February

A window is broken at The Outdoorsman Sport Shop, which is then used by the ALF to set fire to the building in Indiana. Slogans were also painted at the store.

4 May

The Florida Veal Processors Inc, in Florida, is burned to the ground causing half a million dollars in damage. The ALF then claim to have carried out the action.

28 June

A joint claim is made by the ALF and the ELF for an arson attack at the U.S. Department of Agriculture, a control building located in Olympia, Washington.

16 July

Nearly a year after the previous set of meat trucks were destroyed in New Jersey, another truck is destroyed, this time belonging to Steven Corn Furs, the action is claimed again by the ALF. Furthermore, present in this vehicle was a drive-along Barbie truck belonging to Steven Corn's daughter. The truck was destroyed as well.

August

The ALF claimed responsibility for releasing into the wild up to 6,000 mink from a mink farm in Ringwood, UK. About 2,000 of the minks were immediately recaptured, another 2,000 were killed and the rest remained unaccounted-for at the time the incident was reported. Anti-fur activists denounced the action as "a disaster for the [anti-fur] campaign, and it's a disaster for the mink". The action was described by a Royal Society for the Protection of Birds spokesman as an "act of monumental stupidity," amid fears that the non-native carnivorous minks would cause ecological damage. The ALF said it would continue its campaign until the British government introduced new animal-welfare legislation for animals used by the fur industry.

November

- On the 16th, another arson occurs in New Jersey by the ALF, they target a Leather and Fur Ranch van.
- The ALF & ELF release 500 wild horses and torch the Bureau of Land Management in Burns, Oregon, on 29 November. This is claimed in protest of BLM's intention to round up the wild horses and process them for the sale of horsemeat.

=== 1999 ===
27 March

Six vehicles are firebombed by the ALF that are owned by Big Apple Circus in New Jersey.

5 April

Dozens of research animals are taken from the University of Minnesota's laboratories, as well as the property vandalised. The raid is claimed by the ALF.

9 May

- The ALF target Chilrder's Meat Co., in Oregon, destroying a refrigeration unit, a shipping dock and a two-story building. The fires are estimated to have caused $150,000 in damage.

25 June

A Worldwide Primates truck is destroyed by the ALF in Miami, Florida.

August

- In Wisconsin on the 9th, United Feeds, a feeder supplier to mink farms, is burned to the ground. Gene Myer's Fur Farm is then raided, releasing mink into the wild, with both actions claimed by the ALF.
- Forty six dogs are taken from Bio-Devices Inc, California, on 29 August. The research laboratory is also set on fire, causing $250,000 in damages, with the ALF claiming responsibility.
- Two days later, the ALF burn down a McDonald's restaurant in Georgia to the ground. It is reported that Bruce Friedrich, of PETA announces the news on an animal rights website.

23 September

The ALF claim an arson at Phippsburg Sportsmen's Association, Massachusetts, although their attempts fail.

22 October

Four vehicles belonging to Harris Furs are torched by the ALF in Rhode Island.

November

- On the 1st, a Gap clothes store has four petrol bombs thrown inside, which the FBI claimed the ALF were responsible for.
- British documentary-filmmaker Graham Hall told police that he was kidnapped and branded with the letters "ALF" across his back after meeting a man claiming to have information on a dog-fighting ring and filming ALF activists. His film was shown on Channel 4 in the UK during the 1998 hunger strike of ALF activist Barry Horne. Hall said he was taken by several masked men, one of whose voices he said he recognized from a previous gathering of activists, to an unknown house, then was tied to a chair for several hours and branded. No charges were laid as a result of his complaint. In response to the attack, Robin Webb stated "The ALF's policy has always been that there should be no harming life in its work, and we abide by that. There are probably many people with grudges against Mr Hall because of his films over the years, but this attack has nothing to do with us."

== 2000 ==
- Set fire to buildings and trucks at a meatpacking plant, causing $250,000 in damage.
- Placed five incendiary devices in buildings and trucks at a chicken farm, destroying two trucks.
- Attempted to burn down a medical research facility.
- Burned a chicken feed truck, causing $100,000 in damage.

== 2001 ==
- Set fire to an egg farm, causing $1.5 million damage.
- Set fire to a university horticulture property, causing $5.6 million damage and wrecking years of research.
- $500,000 damage in an arson attack on a McDonald's restaurant.
- $1 million damage in arson fire at a research center, issued a bomb scare to the owner's home and mailed him razors.
- Smashed more than 30 windows at a bank.
- Destroyed a research lab, causing $50,000 in damage.
- An incendiary device damaged several cars outside the home of a hunt master.
- Stole an entire hunting pack of 45–55 Beagles from Wye College.
- Stole 30 Beagles and 10 ferrets from Marshall Farms.
- Barry Horne, Britain's most notorious animal rights militant ALF and ARM activist, dies during his fourth hunger strike during an 18-year prison sentence for his campaign of arson.

== 2002 ==
- Sabotaged a biotech plant under construction and wrecked construction equipment.
- Set fire to a poultry truck.
- In an unknown location, a billboard advertising chicken was subvertised by the ALF.
- Activists broke into a fur farm in Bure, eastern France and release 1,000 of 17,000 mink from their cages on 11 November, damage was estimated at $30,000.
- The next day, animal rights activists were again blamed for an arson attack at a Tyneside factory. The beef plant, near Newcastle, UK, was described as an attack against the meat industry. Detectives claimed a link between the £30,000 fire and a series of fires started across the region at a cost of £17 million, reporting that two individuals burnt a refrigerator trailer which contained meat at around 8 pm. The fire then spread to the next trailer and burnt for around two hours until some forty fire fighters contained the blaze.
- On the 24th, police said that 118 puppies and 10 adult dogs were taken from a farm west of Bologna, in Italy, that bred dogs for animal research. "Murderers" and "ALF will free all" was daubed on the walls of the building.

== 2003 ==
3 January

An animal feed company, supplying the Puckeridge Hunt in Hertfordshire, was completely burnt to the ground with "Fox killers" painted over a nearby church. The fire caused £250,000 worth of damage, roaring through the 1828 Grade II listed barn before spreading to the adjacent building, Stocking Pelham Hall. As fire fighters tried to save the hall, the owner remarked that the heat was extraordinary, and that the building was ablaze from end to end.

February

- On the 4th, activists calling themselves the "Groundhog Crew", because of the action coinciding with Groundhog day, cut forty-eight brake and refrigeration system lines of trucks belonging to the Supreme Lobster and Seafood Company in Chicago. "ALF—No Brakes" was left on the door of the building, which was considered to mean the Animal Liberation Front. The communique claimed that the largest lobster distributor in the Midwest had killed over a billion sea creatures in the last quarter century. The FBI claimed that the action caused a "near catastrophic effect", although nobody was hurt in the incident.
- In the very first fur farm raid in Ireland, the ALF released 1,000 mink from a farm in Co Laois, by removing the fencing that surrounded the mink enclosure. The activists said they had opened the cages on 19 February, allowing the mink to escape into the Grand Canal. In a statement, the ALF explained:

Our motivation was that of putting compassion over greed, of pity over barbarity and of freedom over exploitation.

March

- The News & Review publish an article on the 6th after receiving a note regarding a pair of incendiary devices left at a McDonald's restaurant in Chicago. The explosive devices, that failed to go off, were two jugs filled with flammable liquid, which subsequently shut down the building for two hours while police and federal investigators handling the situation, with reporters also crowding the scene. The devices were eventually dismantled by the Butte County Sheriff's Office's bomb experts, after an employee had discovered one device in the morning. The ALF claimed responsibility by leaving a typed note at a payphone nearby, and said they carried out the action because the companies' connection to the factory farming industry, that was based on specieism.
- On the 25th, authorities reported that the Rancho Veal plant in California was targeted again by arsonists, returning after the $250,000 arson in 2003. This time the fire only caused $10,000 worth of damage, with "stop the killing" painted on the back of the building. The owner of the business said that "It gets old, it gets real tiresome".

April

Wallops Wood Farm at Droxford, Hampshire, is raided by 16 members of the ALF and 1,000 chickens are "liberated", with activists claiming damage to cages, eggs, conveyor belts, feed apparatus, equipment, food stores, staff toilets, canteen, rearing shed and a delivery truck. The raid came after an injunction against ALF, SHAC and other groups restricting campaigners for their annual Easther march, banning "abusive communications with the Huntingdon Life Sciences (HLS), following the long-standing campaign against the company.

17 June

A suspicious package, with a label attached saying "a gift from the Animal Liberation Front", was left in a dustbin wrapped up in a box at Act Tech UK Ltd in Northampton. The finance director of the company said they had been affected by animal rights groups because of their parent company Asahi Glass, who supply Huntingdon Life Sciences. Employees were evacuated whilst police searched the building and the RAF Bomb Disposal Unit blew up the package.

25 August

Fencing surrounding a fur farm in Seattle, Washington, was removed and the cages containing 10,000 mink opened, of the 22,000 mink, 9,000 of the animals were recovered by 8pm the following evening. The police were called shortly after the break-in at around 4 pm, when someone saw hundreds of mink running from the farm. The owner claimed that the act was "..a great example of animal cruelty", whilst the ALF, in an anonymous communique, cited the Mink Rehabilitation Project, which they claim proves that mink can survive in the wild.

September

- On the 22nd, and described by Leif Finne, head of a fur farmer association, as "..by far the biggest attack on a fur farm in this country," all of the cages were opened on a fur farm in Kokkola, Finland; releasing 8,000 mink. "ALF" was painted on a wall at the farm, with the authorities also reporting that the raid had been the 60th on fur farms in Finland since 1995.
- Two days later, the ALF broke into the Louisiana State University Inhalation Toxicology Research Facility, destroying research equipment, chambers and computers, totaling $300,000.

13 December

Together with another ALF activist who remains unidentified, Keith Mann raided the Wickham research laboratory and removed 695 mice that were being used to test botulinum toxin, sold commercially as Botox and Dysport. He was later arrested by detectives at his home whilst cleaning his car and the mice were returned to the laboratory. He argued that the tests were illegal because the product was being tested for cosmetic purposes, which is banned in Britain. The Southern Animal Rights Coalition also received paperwork which they say demonstrates cosmetic Botox was being tested on animals. However, in April 2005, a court rejected the claims, ruling that the tests were in compliance with UK regulations because Botox is used for therapeutic purposes to prevent muscle spasms and Mann was found guilty of burglary.

== 2004 ==
April

- The ALF broke into W.B. Saul High School in Roxborough, Philadelphia on 19 April and removed 47 animals; twenty-six gerbils, nine rats, four beagles, three hamsters, two chinchillas, two mice and a ferret. Two years later, referring to the criminalization of eco-terrorism in the state due to the increasing property destruction directed towards those involved in pharmaceutical and other animal research organizations, the Governor noted that:

This public high school has been targeted by militant animal rights activists who have not stopped at peaceful protest, but have vandalized the school, stealing animals and destroying property.

June

- The ALF attack a RMC site in Bournemouth, UK, destroying tractors, bulldozers and a crane; using axes, bolt croppers and crowbars. The company announce shortly afterward that they have pulled out of the construction of Oxford University's animal laboratory.

August

- The Times Picayune reports that the cockfighting arena in Hickory, Louisiana, has been burned to the ground, with "A.L.F." spray painted on the building.

== 2005 ==
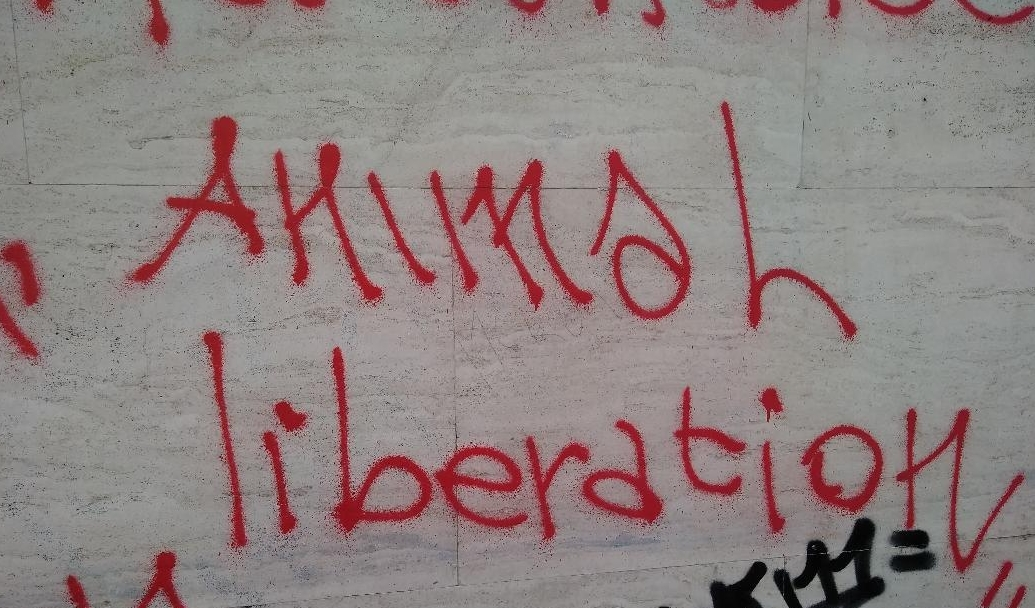
Animal liberation: graffiti in Italy

January

- A major security operation is set up in Clonmel, Ireland for the National Coursing Festival after threats are made by the ALF. With the festivals 80th year and 25,000 members expected to arrive, extra security and Gardaí (Irish police) are drafted in to contain any potential incidents.

16 March

- An ALF raid on a mink farm in Rome, Italy, saw 2,000 mink released.

26 May

- A Vancouver-based brokerage announced that it had dropped a client, Phytopharm PLC, in response to an ALF firebombing of a car belonging to Canaccord executive Michael Kendall in London, England. The ALF stated on the Bite Back website a month later that activists had placed an incendiary device under the car, which was in Kendall's garage at home when it caught fire. Phytopharm was targeted, as were those doing business with it, because it had business links with Huntingdon Life Sciences (HLS).

18 June

- The ALF warned Phytopharm to stay away from Huntingdon or "see your share price crash and your supporters property go up in flames,"

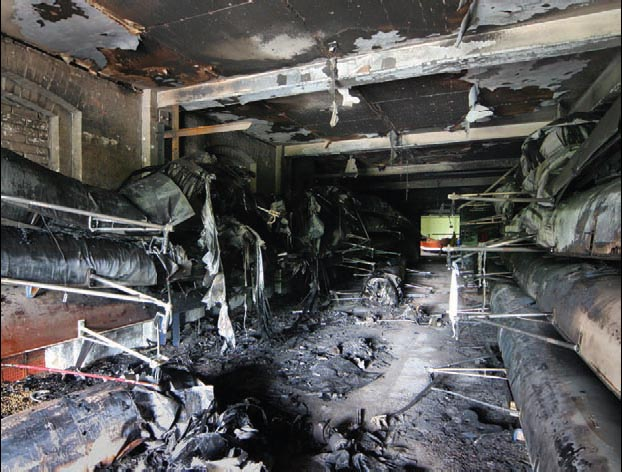
The fire that caused £500,000 damage at Londbridges boathouse by the ALF; Oxford Arson Squad, because the business has ties to Oxford University, 4 July 2005.

4 July

- The Oxford Arson Squad, an ALF cell, caused their first arson in Oxford on 4 July resulting an estimated half a million pounds worth of damage.

The fire caused 26 boats in total to become unusable which were part of St Hilda's, St Catherine's, Hertford, Mansfield and St Benet's Hall boats and boat clubs. Upon investigation the cause of the fire was attributed to incendiary devices which had been placed in the Eight's bays.

The group targeted the boathouse because of apparent ties to Oxford University. A posting to Bite Back said "We are stronger than you, we have more resolve than you and we never give up". Ed Mayne, spokesman for Oxford University, said that "Attacking one of the poorest boatclubs in Oxford certainly isn't going to help them"

- An incendiary device was found deactivated at Christ Church College's Sport Pavilion, despite the group claiming they had targeted Corpus Christi College.
- Keith Mann, a leading ALF member and notorious animal rights extremist, has a tougher measure imposed on his sentence by the Attorney General. This was for his role in removing over 695 mice from Wickham Laboratories.

August

- ALF spokesperson, North American Press Officer and professor Steven Best is banned from entering the UK by the home secretary using hate laws. This follows the closure of Darley Oaks Farm by the ALF and ARM, as well as the July 7 Bombings in London, when the Home Office reported it would prevent people to enter the UK who "foment, justify or glorify terrorist violence in furtherance of particular beliefs; seek to provoke others to terrorist acts; [or] foment other serious criminal activity or seek to provoke others to serious criminal acts." Dr Best has said that he doesn't want to reform vivisectionists, but to wipe them off the face of the planet, claiming that he is not a terrorist, but instead a threat.
- 26 October Carr Securities announced it had withdrawn from making a market in HLS shares after a New York yacht club was vandalized in red paint by the U.S. branch of the ALF, because members of the club worked for Carr Securities, which traded in HLS shares. The ALF announced on its bulletin board: "Let this be a message to any other company who chooses to court HLS in their ... entrance into the NYSE. If you trade in LSR shares, make a market, process orders, or purchase shares you can expect far worse treatment."

== 2006 ==
March

- "We will be back", "we'll shut you down" and graffiti referencing the ALF are spraypainted around Lothian greyhound track, with electrics ripped out, tractor-type vehicles wrecked and track safety boards dismantled causing £10,000 worth of damage. Previously activists have smashed vehicles, slashed tires, sabotaged electrical cables and vandalized the stadium.

April

- The ALF send hoax explosive devices to five senior staff's homes linked to HLS, the animal research laboratory.

June

- The ALF target UCLA researcher Lynn Fairbanks when a Molotov cocktail is placed on the porch of what was believed to be his home on 30 July; instead, by a mistake it is left on the porch of his neighbor, an elderly woman unrelated to the university. After his personal information had been posted on the Primate Freedom Project and having received threatening phone calls, Dario Ringach, an associate neurobiology professor at UCLA, issued a statement in August 2006, that he would discontinue his animal research into visual processing. University spokeswoman Judy Lin was quoted in the press as saying "this is a problem that's much larger than UCLA. These groups have been harassing researchers all over the world," she continued "It has reached terrorist level. The university is very disturbed by this." The ALF in a communique to the North American Animal Liberation Press Office the following month replied: "If the primates could escape from their cages they would do this to Lynn Fairbanks and worse. Since they can't we did."

July

- The ALF anonymously report to Bite Back on 26 July that they have broken into an ex-military laboratory, owned by QinetiQ, grabbing nine goats that were undergoing experiments in hyperbaric chambers. The tests are to simulate under water pressure, to attempt to research the symptoms and possible cures of decompression sickness and to study deep-sea rescue. Southern Animal Rights Coalition then campaigned to end the experiments. According to the group, the animals were tested in order to simulate under water pressure and were suspended in March with a committee of experts looking into alternative research models, such as computer-modelling and safe human trials, in an attempt to simulate the effects of decompression sickness, or 'the bends', caused by ascending too quickly. The Ministry of Defence then scrapped the experiments in February 2008 with goats, claiming that they were essential although they had now collected all the information necessary.

September

- The ALF were linked to an attack on a fish farm near Oban, Scotland in September 2006 which led to the deaths of thousands of halibut.

October

- Six lorries belonging to Deans Foods, Cotswold Farm, a battery egg farm near Witney, were set on fire on 26 October, using what the ALF described as electronic incendiary devices, remotely detonated from miles away. They further claimed that the devices were the first of its kind to be used in the UK by the ALF, which caused £250,000 worth of damage, and also stated in a communique to Bite Back that the action was a warning and dedicated to Barry Horne and animal rights prisoners.

November

- An arson, claimed by the ALF, was carried out at The Queen's College, Oxford because of its financial relationship with Oxford University. The activists report in an anonymous communique to Bite Back a few days later: "Attacks will escalate in the face of an institution and government which have sought to destroy legal protest and continue to sanction violence to animals. For Barry"

December

- Donald Currie, said by police to have been the ALF's most important bomb maker, was sentenced to 12 years in jail, with a recommendation of at least six years, after conducting a fire bomb campaign targeting suppliers and customers of Huntingdon Life Sciences.

== 2007 ==
January

- ALF activists enter Tegel Factory Broiler Farm in South Auckland, New Zealand, whose owner was found guilty of cruelty to animals by the Society for the Prevention of Cruelty to Animals in 1996, because three sheep died suffering from distress and pain. They claimed the birds were crammed into cages, unable to spread their wings, walk, and were surrounded by dead animals. Activists claimed in a communique to Auckland Animal Action the rescuing of five birds and removal of ten dead birds, which were then sent to an individual responsible for the suffering and death. They said the company had; "no interest in animal welfare at all."
- University of Utah neuroscientist Audie Leventhal's home is doused in glass-eating acid, covering it with animal rights slogans such as "Cat Killer". Damages estimated at $20,000.

February

- Incendiary devices were found at Templeton College, Oxford; Robin Webb said as a continuation of a campaign against Oxford University's proposed new biomedical center, which will house and conduct experiments on animals. They claimed that the action was "...part of an ongoing fight against the University of Oxford and its continued reign of terror over the unseen victims inside its animal labs.".
- In Estonia, locks of two fur shops are glued shut and one has ALF spray painted on the wall.

March

- On 6 March, the financial adviser and first vice-president of Wachovia Securities is targeted in Portland, Oregon, because the ALF allege that Wachovia owns over half a billion dollars in shares in GlaxoSmithKline. "Drop GSK" was spray-painted on his garage and ALF "scrawled" across his car in black paint.

April

- A hunting supply shop has windows smashed and doors painted, claimed by ALF Estonia reporting; "We have only just begun".
- The ALF again target another Wachovia Securities V.P. in Portland, because the company invest in GlaxoSmithKline, a HLS customer. His SUV is spray-painted with slogans, with the activists threatening Wachovia saying; "We have the names and addresses of the top executives, and believe us our actions are like child's play compared to what we have in store."
- Another home owned by Audie Leventhal has house locks glued and salt poured on the lawn.

June

- An estimated £500,000 in damages is caused in Oxfordshire after two fuel tankers are blown up with incendiary devices. ALF activists vow to continue targeting livestock businesses.

August

- The ALF report that they have targeted the home of an animal researcher for the Oregon National Primate Research Center, at the Oregon Health & Science University, spray-painting "ALF Eyes on You" on his garage and covering his daughter's car with a white foamy chemical. In a communique to the North American Animal Liberation Press Office, the ALF said that his involvement in research into the effect of nicotine on fetuses should stop. The researcher responded by stating he mainly worked on cultured cells and "does as little research on animals as possible."
- 2,500 mink are released from unlocked cages at a fur farm in Helsinki, Finland. EVR was left spray-painted on a feed silo at the farm, standing for the Finnish ALF.
- 2 September 500 mink are released from their cages in Korsholm, Finland, with "EVR" painted at the farm. A chief inspector made the connection that it stood for the ALF in Finnish.

October

- UCLA researcher Edythe London's home was vandalized, during which a window was broken and a garden hose inserted, flooding her home and causing over $20,000 in damages. In the communique released following the action, the ALF promised to return if necessary:

One more thing Edythe, water was our second choice, fire was our first.... It would have been just as easy to burn your house down Edythe. As you slosh around your flooded house consider yourself fortunate this time. We will not stop until UCLA discontinues its primate vivisection programme.

- The headquarters of Escada is vandalized in Estonia because of the companies marketing of fur.

November

- Activists claim the liberation of over 100 hens from Shepherd's Egg Farm near Spanish Fork, Utah, on the 5th. They claimed there were several sheds containing tens of thousands of chickens, many of which in bad conditions and that the hens were rehomed where they can go outside. The said in a communique, activists claim that around the world the ALF are making progress, and dedicate the action to all animal liberation prisoners, including Barry Horne, died six years ago today on a hunger strike.

Farm operators said they were confused by the raid, and that no damage had been done to indicate it had happened.

- Vehicles allegedly belonging to a researcher of the Department of Experimental Psychology at Oxford University were firebombed as well as a director's sports car of Acorn Integrated systems who the group accused is aiding the construction of the laboratory. The ALF claim that for Barry Horne and Felix, the actions will continue.
- Auckland Animal Action received an anonymous communique and undercover footage, exposing animals suffering from ammonia burns, overcrowding, eye infections due to a lack of water, as well as workers punching a bird. As part of the six-week investigation, 30 ducks are rescued in order to live out their natural lives, with the ALF claiming:

For the short six weeks of their lives they are crammed into overcrowded, filthy sheds where they are deprived of water to bathe in, nesting material and the ability to display natural behaviours and social patterns.

- Three Wachovia Banks are attacked in California, involving graffiti and jamming or destroying the night deposit box using explosives. The ALF claimed the vandalism by sending communiques to the Animal Liberation Press Office, media outlets and Wachovia. The company was the largest shareholder of Huntingdon Life Sciences (HLS) largest shareholder, selling its shares following the actions.

December

- The Animal Liberation Front took credit for targeting the home of an Oregon Health & Science University (OHSU) researcher who conducts reproductive studies on primates inside the Oregon National Primate Research Center. The researcher awoke to find the words "Sadist" and "ALF" spray painted on his Audi and Jeep Grand Cherokee cars. The vehicles were also reportedly damaged by paint stripper. This was the second OHSU researcher to have his property damaged by ALF in less than 6 months.
- Two homes in Wales, which belonged to the joint-master and hunt secretary of the Golden Valley Hunt, had property spray painted. The activists only left initials for anti-hunting groups the ALF and HRS (Hunt Retribution Squad).
- Following a sustained campaign from animal rights groups, two properties in Cassington and Kidlington were graffitied, with van tyres burst at one of the locations. Thames Valley Police said they were investigating the acts of "minor criminal damage", with the ALF claiming it would "stop businesses dealing with the uni".
- KFC in Bremerton, Washington, had "Animal Love," "Mess with Animals get Served," and "Meat is Murder" spray-painted on the exterior of the building. Officers found ALF left on the restaurant, as well as "Boycott KFC" fliers plastered on the exterior.
- Activists in the Netherlands painted graffiti on the homes of several Van Der Looy employees due to the company's involvement with a life-science industrial park. On 7 January, the company announced it was pulling out of building project and stated that the activists had acted in an "unacceptable intimidating attitude".

== 2008 ==
January

- ALF volunteers raided Highgate Rabbit Farm on 6 January, and removed 129 rabbits which they said were due to end up in laboratories for animal research. The owner said he was shocked and disappointed when discovering he had been burgled, citing concern for the rabbits which he believed would not survive in the wild and would be unsuitable as pets. A quad bike, lawnmower, van and a sports car were also reported to have been paintstripped and glued during the visit causing thousands of pounds worth of damage. The volunteers accused the owner of selling rabbits to laboratories such as Huntingdon Life Sciences and other universities in the United Kingdom.

February

- University of Hasselt's Biomedical Research Institute in the town of Diepenbeek, Belgium was burned to the ground. "ALF" was written on a building nearby.
- The ALF return and an incendiary device is left at the front door of UCLA researcher Edythe London's home in Los Angeles early on 5 February. The device charred the front door. Nobody was home at the time.
- Three goats are liberated from Carpinteria High School in California and discovered wandering in a rural area, in an action claimed against the teaching of anthropocentrism.
- On the third anniversary of the Hunting Act, activists targeted the Duke of Beaufort's and VWH kennels, as well as the Hunting HQ in Gloucestershire. "Enforce the ban" and "ALF" were painted on the driveways of both hunts and the walls of the Hunting Office. Some cars and lorries had paint stripper poured onto them, with others having their tyres slashed. The Masters of Foxhounds Association said it appeared the Animal Liberation Front had been in three places in one night. The activists in a message to Bite Back website said:

This action is dedicated to Mike Hill the young hunt sab killed by hunt scum. This action is also timed to coincide with the anniversary of the hunt ban 3 years ago. The ban's not being enforced and most hunts still kill animals. Maybe when they stop breaking the law we will.

- "Stop Selling Foie Gras" and "Ban Foie Gras" were spray painted on the walls of Midsummer House in Cambridge. The Animal Liberation Front reported to the Cambridge Evening News that they had poured etching fluid over windows, paint stripper on window frames and glued the locks of the restaurant. It has also been the subject of protests by Cambridge Animal Rights, although denied any involvement in the action that initially caused an estimated £3,000 in damage, but was then calculated later to exceed £6,000. The next day, the owner announced that he had taken the dish off the menu, saying he felt pushed into the decision following attacks by the ALF and a brick thrown through the restaurants window after 7pm one Saturday.

April

- A campaign by the ALF, PETA and In Defense of Animals, leads to San Francisco Art Institute suspending their controversial art exhibition. It is claimed that death threats, amongst others, were used in an attempt to shut down the event.
- 50 mink released from a fur farm in Jefferson, Oregon and breeding records destroyed. The Fur Commission USA claims all mink were recovered, but estimates the dollar loss for the destroyed breeding records was $5,000.
- The ALF claim responsibility for spraypainting "Drop Oxford Uni" on shutters at Steve Rusk Plumbers, Wootton Road Industrial Estate, Oxford. The activists said the attack was carried out due to the companies involvement with the laboratory at South Parks Road owned by Oxford University.

June

- In an effort to force UCLA to end their primate experiments, the ALF set alight a UCLA van.

July

- Ahead of the shooting season the ALF cause extensive damage to grouse pens and electric fencing around Ilkley Moor. Bingley Moor Partnership, which won rights for grouse shooting on the moors, said due to shortage of grouse stocks there wouldn't be any activity for at least two years. The Moorland Association branded the action as "criminal".

A large grouse pen was identified and trashed; the water pipes and distributors were left split and smashed. The wire fencing from the entire enclosure was brought down. The electric fencing was sabotaged and the system destroyed. Two set fen traps were discovered and placed permanently out of commission. Two smaller pens were found nearby and the netting roof and wire surrounds were left in tatters. Feeders in the area were also tampered with.

August

- ALF activists claim responsibility for releasing 6,000 mink from Rippin Fur Farm before opening the farm gate in Aldergrove, British Columbia. This was done near Aldergrove Lake Park, which activists claim "provides over 200 acres of water habitat for them to survive."
- A press officer for the ALF reports that 300 mink had been released and breeding cards destroyed at a South Jordan mink farm.

September

- The ALF claimed responsibility for releasing mink from the S&N Fur Farm in Scio. The ranch owner claims that of the 215 mink released, 177 were recaptured and 4 died.
- Thousands of mink were released and the records were destroyed at a Davis County, Utah mink farm. The Fur Commission USA claims most of the mink were recaptured and that at least half a dozen died.
- Four Barclays Banks are vandalised in Hampshire during the month, because of Barclays previous trading in HLS shares. Slogans are painted including "Scum", "Murderers" and "ALF". In the same month a FedEx van is covered in slogans and has tyres slashed in Wickham. In January 2011 Thomas Harris pleaded guilty to "conspiracy to cause criminal damage" for his role in planning the attacks.
- Supporters of the ALF and other animal rights campaigners are given £40,000 compensation, after they were prevented from attending a demonstration against live exports. The London activists were travelling to Dover in July 2006 on their way to a protest against sheep and cattle being deported, before they were reportedly photographed, threatened with arrest and unlawfully denied the right to protest.

December

- ALF Netherlands claim responsibility for setting on fire two cars belonging to a Euronext employee in Wassenaar, because the company trade shares in HLS. Activists also claimed vandalizing the home of NYSE Euronext director with slogans in Noordwijkerhout on the same day and setting alight two cars belonging to another Euronext employees three weeks before.

== 2009 ==
January

- A fake bomb is planted at University of California, San Diego, leading to evacuations at the university's school of medicine. The ALF claimed responsibility with an official press release and three phone calls.
- A Bradford councillor has two cars covered in acid (paint stripped) and tyres slashed, because of her support for the Ilkley moor shoot. The ALF claim responsibility with an anonymous posting on the Bite Back website.

February

- The ALF is accused of filming inside Ireland's six known fur farms, showing clips of distressed mink. The footage is later released by the Coalition Against The Fur Trade (CAFT).

May

- The Animal Liberation Front claimed responsibility for an arson attack against Scientific Resources International in Reno, Nevada a company that imports primates from China for scientific research. The fire caused $300,000 in damages. A manager for the company claimed the building had been destroyed and the company would be unable to conduct business until it was rebuilt.

March

- The DBF (Dutch ALF) release 3,000 mink from a fur farm in the Zeeland province, near Rotterdam, Netherlands, on the night of Saturday 14. In a communique, the ALF claimed to have also destroyed breeding cards in 20 of the sheds, damaged nets and spray painted 'DBF is everywhere'. Vegan Streaker Peter Janssen is later arrested on suspicion of the raid.
- A fire broke out at a livestock auction in Ussel (Corrèze), France, in the early hours of Saturday 28. The initials 'ALF' were found painted on the building, causing future auctions to be cancelled.

July

- Shortly after The Advertiser reported pigeons were getting trapped under the railway bridge in Fetcham, Leatherhead, which was due to the council's policy of pigeon-proofing the area, a man contacted the media and reported that the ALF were claiming responsibility for slicing the netting, and said they would be watching who puts more up.

November

- Carrie Feldman and Scott DeMuth are subpoenaed to a grand jury investigating the 2004 raid of the University of Iowa, during which the ALF claimed responsibility for vandalizing two labs and three offices. DeMuth is indicted with conspiracy to vandalize property under the Animal Enterprise Protection Act shortly after their subpoena. Feldman serves 4 months on civil contempt for refusing to testify, but is never charged with a crime.

December

- Police detain three youths in Mexico City after investigators find links between the ALF and homemade bombs that burned seven vehicles. The symbol of a local version of the ALF was found spray painted near in the attacks.

== 2010 ==
April

- The Sheepskin Factory in Glendale, Colorado is destroyed by arson on 30 April. According to The Denver Post, in June, an Internet posting associated with Bite Back claims the ALF are responsible for the arson.

May

- A leather store in Salt Lake City, Utah is destroyed by arson on 31 May. According to the Denver Post, in June, an Internet posting associated with Bite Back claims ALF responsibility for the arson.

July

- After two previous arsons by the same individual, ALF Lone Wolf (Walter Bond) sets a third fire, this time to a restaurant in Sandy, Utah because he objected to them serving foie gras on the menu.
- Mel Broughton is jailed for 10 years after a jury found him guilty of conspiracy to commit arson. Broughton had planted petrol bombs at Oxford University; one went off, two others failed.

August

- In an action costing the Greek fur industry potentially exceeding €1 million, the ALF in Athens, Greece, report they liberated 50,000 mink from two fur farms in the towns of Kastoria and Siatista, described as the heart of Greece's fur industry. Greece's National Fur Breeders' Association claimed in response to the attacks that most of the animals would likely die due to the heat.

September

- 400 mink liberated from a fur farm in Granite Falls, Washington. In an anonymous claim to the North American Animal Liberation Press Office, the Animal Liberation Front took credit for the action declaring: "we released aprox. [sic] 400 of the mink there and all we can say is that it wasn't enough."

October

- The owner of Capilano Furs has his car painted black and tyres slashed. Later that same day ALF Canada claim responsibility for the vandalism, as well as attacks against another clothing store and a restaurant.
- ALF claim they removed a large amount of fencing from a deer farm in Molalla, Oregon, with the intention of releasing deer into the surrounding forest. However, there were no animals on the land when the fence was cut. Ranchers claimed they weren't worried by the attempted liberation, while an anonymous email sent to the North American Animal Liberation Press Office stated; "The venison meat industry remains small in this country, but as long as they exploit sentient animals, they will remain a target of the ALF." The FBI noted the incident as minor vandalism, rather than terrorism.

== 2011 ==
June

- The ALF used an industrial pressurized chemical sprayer with a two-foot-long spraying area to spray a corrosive chemical into the Speiser Furs salon in Vancouver, British Columbia. A glue like substance was also sprayed into the locks. Around 25 leather and fur coats were destroyed causing $50,000 in damage.

September

- The ALF claims to have sabotaged the fencing surrounding a pen at Damascus Elk Farm in Clackamas, Oregon. This was the second deer farm targeted by the ALF in the state of Oregon, and the third ever in the United States.
- 300 mink released from a fur farm outside Astoria, OR. All but 40 of the mink were recaptured. The Gordon Shumway Brigade Claimed responsibility. The Gordon Shumway Brigade apparently refers to the main character in a 1980s television show, ALF, which stood for 'alien life form'. ALF is also an abbreviation for the Animal Liberation Front. This act was followed in October with a fur farm raid in Jewell, Iowa which saw the release of 1,200–1,500 mink and another raid in Gifford, Washington which saw the release of 1,000 mink. This marked the largest wave of mink liberations in the United States since 1998.
- Animal rights activists claimed responsibility for a fire that caused $100,000 in damage to Rocky Mountain Fur & Fireworks, a fur retailer in Caldwell, Idaho. The group claimed they drilled a hole into the buildings storage space, pumped fuel through, placed multiple charges next to an adjourning structure and placed ignition devices to start the fire. The communique was signed by a group calling itself "Arson Unit". A spokesman for the North American Animal Liberation Press Office, said the Arson Unit may refer to a branch of the Animal Liberation Front.

== 2012 ==
January

- An anonymous claim received by the North American Animal Liberation Press Office takes credit for an arson at Harris Ranch, California's largest feed cattle processor located in Coalinga. The fire caused the complete destruction of 14 cattle transporters. The anonymous claim stated that the attack was aimed at "the horrors and injustices of factory farming".
- ALF activists claimed to have sabotaged a tuna pen off the coast of Ugljan, Croatia by cutting and lowering down the net to allow the endangered bluefin tuna to escape. The communique claims that this was the second action of its kind, after a Maltese tuna farm was damaged in the summer of 2011, causing 100.000 Euro in damages and liberating an undefined number of animals.

March

- 75 to 100 pheasants were liberated from a farm in Scio, Oregon that breeds ring-necked pheasants for hunting and dog training. In an anonymous post on the Bite Back magazine website, The Animal Liberation Front took credit for dismantling a pheasant aviary and liberating the animals "into the night sky". Initial damages and losses are estimated at $4,000 and the Linn County Sheriff's Department is investigating this crime as an act of domestic terrorism.

May

- The Animal Liberation Front took credit for a vandalism spree targeting four Vancouver-area fur stores. Snowflake Furs, Pappas Furs, Capilano Furs and Speiser Furs were doused with red paint on windows, storefronts and doors. In an anonymous claim of responsibility sent to Bite Back magazine the vandals declared "The new Fur Wars have just begun."

August

- According to a communique posted by the North American Animal Liberation Press Office the ALF claims to have liberated 13 foxes and damaged equipment at a fur farm in Elkton, VA.
- "DROP HLS" and "PUPPY KILLER" were in red paint across the garage door and driveway of a Beckman Coulter Inc. executive in Yorba Linda, California. A red stain was also thrown into the woman's backyard pool "to remind her of the blood on her hands." In a press release the Animal Liberation Front claimed it targeted Beckman Coulter for their ties to the U.K.-based Huntingdon Life Sciences warning: "You know what to do to bring this to an end. Cut your losses and drop HLS. Until then expect to spend thousands more on damages because this is not a one time event."
- Animal rights activists are suspected of spraying a noxious substance through the mail slots of Speiser Furs and Snowflake Furs in Vancouver. Police say that surveillance footage shows two people disguised in heavy coats, bandannas and hats squirt at least a half dozen syringes filled with a white liquid seven into the buildings through a gap in the front doors forcing the stores to be closed while hazmat crews and police investigated. Back in May both these locations were vandalized with red paint by the ALF. A spokesman for the ALF in regards to the incident stated: "I would fully expect (the attacks) to continue and perhaps escalate,"
- ALF claimed to have released hundreds of thousands of rainbow trout from a fish farm in northern Sweden. The farm was uninsured and police estimated the damages in the millions of Swedish krona.

September

- In an email to Bite Back the ALF took credit for ripping open a flight pen at a game bird farm in Canby, Oregon on the night of 21 September and liberating captive pheasants into the wild. However the farm owner claims that most of the farms 2 dozen pheasants remained in the pen. This was the second pheasant breeding operation targeted in the state of Oregon by the ALF in 2012. Also, on the same night in the Toledo province of Spain the ALF claims to have released 400 partridges from a game farm that bred birds for hunting.

November

- 1600 mink were liberated from a fur farm outside of Skara, Sweden. In an email to Bite Back magazine the Animal Liberation Front claimed they planned this action to coincide with World Vegan Day.
- Members of the Animal Liberation Front took credit for firebombing cars of scientists attending a Biomedical Symposium in Chile. The group claimed to have placed explosive incendiary devices beneath a van belonging to the University of Concepción and a truck belonging to an animal researcher outside the International Symposium on Biomedical Research Models.
- The Animal Liberation Front is linked to incidents on two chicken farms in the Niagara region in which equipment and buildings were damaged, and slogans were spray painted on walls including the letters "ALF". The damages at one farm was estimated at $25,000 and $150 at the other.

December

- The ALF claims to have vandalized fur and leather garments at Four Seasons Fur and T.O. Leather Fashions Ltd. in Toronto, by spraying a foul smelling chemical through cracks in the doors. The owner of Leather Fashions Ltd said he discovered a horrible, rotten-egg smell and a clear liquid covering the floor the next morning, but that no merchandise was damaged.

== 2013 ==
January

- The ALF issued an anonymous statement declaring that members hit an unoccupied Vancouver police cruiser with a Molotov cocktail while it was parked in front of the home of Megan Halprin, who co-owns the Snowflake Furs store in the city's downtown. The statement went on to threaten "This is a fur war. This is a class war. The elite and the police are the enemy and will be treated as such." According to a police spokesman the incendiary weapon never hit the police cruiser and failed to cause any damage. Both Halprin's home and business have been the target of previous acts of vandalism with paint, bleach and graffiti.

March

- The ALF claimed responsibility for spray-painting "ALF" on the door of Glass House Couture in Vancouver. They also sprayed butyric acid into the building. The activists claimed they targeted the store for its sale of fur. This act of vandalism resulted in the closure of the store for a month and a half.

June

- A lone Animal Liberation Front activist claimed to have punctured several slaughterhouse truck tires with an ice-pick at Cami International Poultry in Ontario, Canada. Damages are estimated at $1,000.

July

- An online statement from the ALF claimed that "anarchists in San Diego" attacked the fur retail store, Furs by Graf. During the attack windows were covered with eroding etching solution, and slogans were sprayed on the exterior with red paint. Foul smelling acid was also sprayed into the store, according to the statement. The ALF also targeted the homes and vehicles of the stores owners with acid, paint stripper and spray paint.
- Animal Liberation Front, said they used wire cutters to enter the property of the Ash Grove Pheasant Farm in Riverside, California to steal and release more than a dozen pheasants being kept in an aviary. The farm owners claim that they awoke to find one loose pheasant in their yard, and that of the nine birds left in the aviary some had to be euthanized. The owners had previously sold pheasants for hunting, but will stop selling pheasants as a result of this action.
- Activists cut holes in a perimeter fence and released 3,600 mink from the Moyle Mink Ranch near Declo, Idaho. The farmer also claims that breeding papers were thrown into a pile, severely hampering the farms breeding program. The Animal Liberation Front is taking responsibility for the raid.

August

- The ALF took credit for gluing locks shut, pouring red paint, and spray-painting the words "Free the Animals" across the patio of the Taco Asylum Restaurant in Costa Mesa, Ca. They claimed to have targeted Taco Asylum for selling the meat of rabbits, ducks, cows, and pigs.
- In an anonymous message to Bite Back magazine, the Animal Liberation Front took credit for vandalizing the truck of Eugen Klein at his North Vancouver home, which is also where he runs Capilano Furs & Taxidermy Studios. The group claims to have: "shot syringes filled with a foul-smelling liquid through the rubber sealing and into his truck". The vandalism was in response to an article in the National Post that featured an interview with Klein.
- The ALF claimed responsibility for the attempted release of 5 game birds from the E. E. Wilson Wildlife Area in Monmouth, Oregon. The activists claimed to have cut open two cages giving the birds a chance to escape into the wild, but according to law enforcement none of the birds left their cages. In a communique posted on Bite Back magazine the activists said their efforts to cut more than two cages was thwarted when a car pulled into a parking lot next to the cages, forcing them to make a premature departure.
- ALF members claimed to have glued the front door lock shut and a truck ignition along with spray painting "MEAT IS MURDER" at the Mcnee Meats facility in North Branch, Michigan. They also claimed to have released cows, destroyed light fixtures and smashed chicken cages at the facility. This company had previously been linked to an E. coli contamination in 2011.
- The ALF took credit for the release of approximately 420 mink and 75 fox from the Bollert Fur Farm in Renton, Ontario. According to a spokesperson for the Fur Council of Canada most of the animals were recovered and returned to their cages, but 15 mink remained unaccounted for along with 20 fox. Two weeks earlier, a similar release occurred at the East Fork Mink Ranch in Morris, Illinois, where 2,000 mink were released and words "Liberation is love" was painted on a barn. No one has taken responsibility for the Illinois break-in.

October

- Between July and October 2013 animal rights activists claimed responsibility for late night raids on fur farms in Wisconsin, Minnesota, Utah, Iowa, and 4 other states resulting in the release of over 7,700 mink. That is more raids than in the preceding three years combined. At least 3 of these raids were claimed by the ALF.

== 2014 ==
January

- A McDonald's franchise was vandalized in Jaffa. "ALF" was found spray painted in red on the windows of the franchise.

February

- A KFC restaurant in Upper Hutt, New Zealand was damaged after someone set fire to the rear of the building. In an email to Bite Back magazine the ALF took responsibility for the blaze.

March

- In an email from Bite Back magazine and the Animal Liberation Front claimed to have destroyed breeding records at the Fraser Fur Farm in Ronan, MT. The farm raises bobcats for fur. The activists claimed they destroyed the breeding records "to ensure the loss of irreplaceable genetic lines, rendering the breeding stock of a given fur-producing business lost." However the activists attempt to free the captive bobcats was thwarted when residents awoke to chase the activists off the property.

May

- The ALF took credit for the liberation of approximately 35 pheasants from a game bird farm in Gervais, Oregon. According to the farm owners the birds released were part of the brooding stock and the loss of profits is estimated in the thousands of dollars.

July

- Vandals affiliated with the Animal Liberation Front took credit for pouring bleach and "chemical abrasives" into the fuel tanks of mobile slaughter units owned by two meat processing companies in the state of Washington. The owner of one of the slaughter trucks in Battle Ground, Washington, said he noticed the damage to his truck when it started smoking and running terribly. This most recent vandalism brings to four the number of mobile slaughter units hit in the Northwest in the past month. In June, two trucks owned by slaughter companies were similarly damaged in Stayton, Oregon, and Hillsboro, Oregon.

September

- The Animal Liberation Front said in a written release sent to news organizations that it had released 30 foxes from an Iowa farm that raises foxes for fur. The owner of the farm said the group had only managed to destroy property, including stripping away much of the farm's fencing, but that none of the foxes ended up escaping.

December

- A fire ripped through the Oberon Abattoir in New South Wales. Firefighters arrived to find the abattoir's main building, and gas main alight The ALF later took credit for the fire.

== 2015 ==
March

- A KFC in Reno, Nevada had a window smashed out and a Molotov cocktail thrown inside, causing minor damages to the interior of the building. The letters "ALF" were found spray-painted across the drive-thru menu.
- 50 pheasants were released from a game-bird breeder in Beavercreek, Oregon after unknown persons cut the lock to the door on one of four bird pens on the property. The Animal Liberation Front claimed responsibility for the release in an anonymous statement saying "These birds were bred, among other reasons, to suffer and die in pre-orchestrated canned hunts; a practice which represents the height of human arrogance and disregard towards animal life,". According to the Clackamas County Sheriff's Office this farm is one of four similar types of businesses in Clackamas County to have been struck by the group in recent years.

June

- Fire was set to 2 trucks belonging to Harlan Laboratory in Mississauga, ON. In an anonymous email the ALF claimed to have planted incendiary devices beneath the trucks in an effort to "eliminate this...company's means of transportation, to disrupt the systematic torture and murder of innocent animals, and to cause as much monetary damage as possible." Harlan is owned by Huntingdon Life Sciences a popular target of animal rights campaigners. The group accuses Harlan of supplying animals and feed for vivisection.

July

- 6,800 mink were released from four separate sheds at RBR Fur Farms Inc. near the town of St. Marys. This was the second mink release in the Perth County area since May 2015. The Animal Liberation Front took responsibility for an earlier incident at the neighbouring Glenwood Fur Farm that involved the release of about 1,600 mink. Will Hazlitt, a press officer with NAALPO, said he suspects activists who wanted to make a case against the fur industry through "economic sabotage" were responsible for the most recent break-in.

August

- Animal protectors entered a fur farm near Jindřichův Hradec spraying mink with pink dye in order to makes their fur useless. Officials claimed that 13 of the mink died as a result of "stress" presumably caused by the intrusion. The inscription "ALF" was sprayed on the farm fence, which is the acronym for the Animal Liberation Front.

September

- Animal rights activists attempting to thwart a pheasant hunt cut open a holding pen at E.E. Wilson Wildlife Management Area, but state game officials say only a handful of birds escaped. The wildlife area's manager discovered a hole had been cut in the mesh surrounding one of the pens, allowing about 15 of the birds to get loose. In a statement posted online, activists associated with the Animal Liberation Front claimed to have hiked through the woods to reach the holding pen and used aviation snips to cut a hole in the mesh in order to "spare these animals from an almost certain death at the hands of hunters."

December

- The ALF took credit for an arson fire that burned down a clubhouse operated by the Fox Terrier Association in Germany. This arson came after an incident in June when the ALF released several foxes from an enclosure on the club ground.

== 2016 ==
August

- The ALF took credit for another arson fire that burned down the residency of a farmer in County Antrim, Northern Ireland. This came after the farmer had been convicted twice of lack of care to his animals, resulting in dozens of farm animals starving to death in horrific conditions.

== See also ==
- Animal Liberation Front Supporters Group
- Animal Liberation Press Office
- Bite Back
- Behind the Mask
