= Revolutionary Cells – Animal Liberation Brigade =

Guerrilla animal rights group

The Revolutionary Cells – Animal Liberation Brigade (RCALB), known simply as Animal Liberation Brigade (ALB), is a name used by animal liberationists who advocate the use of a diversity of tactics within the animal liberation movement, whether non-violent or not. As part of a praxis, the intention is to destroy oppressive institutions, describing an endgame for animal abusers. The Revolutionary Cells is not a group but an example of a leaderless resistance, as a banner for autonomous, covert cells who carry out direct action similar to the Animal Rights Militia (ARM).

Founded in the United States, after bombing Chiron and Shaklee's corporate offices in 2003, activists have since used the banner to firebomb vehicles and threaten to send letter bombs to individuals in the California area. Targets have included corporate customers of animal testing laboratory Huntingdon Life Sciences and animal researchers at UCLA and the California National Primate Research Center. The FBI issued an arrest warrant for Daniel Andreas San Diego for his alleged association with the cell responsible for the 2003 bombings.

== Philosophy ==
=== Guidelines ===
The Revolutionary Cells guidelines was posted on the Bite Back website after the second bombing:

- To take strategic direct action (be it non-violent or not) against the oppressive institutions that permeate the world.
- Make every effort to minimize non-target casualties, be they human or non-human.
- Respect a diversity of tactics, whether they be non-violent or not.
- Any underground activist fighting for the liberation of the human, earth or animal nations may consider themselves a Revolutionary Cells volunteer.

=== Who are RCALB? ===
The Bite Back communique also explained who the Revolutionary Cells were and why they exist:

The revolutionary cells exists as a front group for militants across the liberationary movement spectrum. We are anarchists, communists, anti-racists, animal liberationists, earth liberationists, luddites, feminists, queer liberationists, and many more things across various other fronts. Where ever there is oppression there are those unwilling to idly stand by and let it occur, and those people make up the nucleus of the revolutionary cells.

=== Structure and aims ===
The group formed the same leaderless-resistance model as the Animal Liberation Front (ALF), which consists of small, autonomous, covert terror cells acting independently. A cell may consist of just one person.

According to the Memorial Institute for the Prevention of Terrorism, the Front describes itself as "an international coalition fighting injustice". The Institute's knowledge Base describes it as an "unusually violent animal-rights terrorist movement [...] with a penchant for hyperbole and casting about pretensions of power and importance." Oren Segal, co-director of Anti-Defamation League's Center on Extremism, believes the group consists of the same few "lone wolves" that carry out actions in the name of the ALF and Earth Liberation Front (ELF), "the names are interchangeable [...] they're going to rename themselves depending on what actions they're doing."

The existence of activists calling themselves the Revolutionary Cells or Animal Rights Militia (ARM), another name used to inflict violence, reflects a struggle within the Animal Liberation Front and the animal rights movement in general, between those who believe violence and terror tactics are justified, and those who insist the movement should reject it in favor of non-violent resistance.

=== Extensional self-defense ===
Steven Best has coined the term "extensional self-defense" to describe actions carried out in defense of animals by human beings acting as "proxy agents." He argues that, in carrying out acts of extensional self-defense, activists have the moral right to engage in acts of sabotage or even violence. Extensional self-defense is justified, he writes, because animals are "so vulnerable and oppressed they cannot fight back to attack or kill their oppressors." Best argues that the principle of extensional self-defense mirrors the penal code statues known as the "necessity defense," which can be invoked when a defendant believes that the illegal act was necessary to avoid imminent and great harm. He also argues that is not just a theory, but policy in some African countries where governments hire armed soldiers to protect endangered wildlife from poachers who wish to sell their body parts in international markets:

Pacifists cannot stop poachers, but bullets can, and while many measures must be taken to protect endangered species, right now armed soldiers are the best protection rhinos and elephants have against murderous, weapon-wielding poachers.

In testimony to the Senate in 2005, Jerry Vlasak stated that he regarded violence against Huntingdon Life Sciences as an example of extensional self-defense.

== Actions ==
=== Pipe bombs ===
The RCALB took credit for its first action on 27 August 2003, when two "pipe bombs filled with an ammonium nitrate" were placed at Chiron Corporation's offices in Emeryville, California. Both devices were packed with nails to act as shrapnel. Chiron was targeted because of a contract with Huntingdon Life Sciences, a New Jersey–based animal testing contractor. A group calling itself Revolutionary Cells of the Animal Liberation Brigade e-mailed a statement to reporters taking credit for the bombing which was also sent to the Bite Back website. One of the bombs exploded an hour after the first, although no casualties resulted from the second blast, as the second device was discovered and the area cleared before the explosion.

=== Office bombing ===
In September 2003, the RCALB took responsibility for another bombing, this time at the offices of Shaklee Inc. in Pleasanton, California. Shaklee was targeted because its parent company, Yamanouchi Pharmaceutical, does business with HLS. The attackers are said to be linked to Daniel Andreas San Diego, who was featured on America's Most Wanted and has been placed on the FBI's most wanted terrorists list. A statement was again released from the group to Bite Back this time also including their manifesto. It was thought the bomb was this intended to cause harm, as nails flew out "at a speed of 100 miles an hour", although again no one was harmed.

=== Incendiary device ===
On 24 June 2007, an explosive device was placed under a car belonging to Arthur Rosenbaum, a pediatric ophthalmologist who carries out animal experimentation with cats and rhesus monkeys at the Jules Stein Eye Institute at UCLA. The device failed to explode because of a faulty fuse, but was still claimed by the Animal Liberation Brigade who called for "an end to systematic violence and oppression". UCLA offered a reward for information leading to the arrest of the bomber. Then acting Chancellor, Norman Abrams, said the university "remains steadfast in its commitment to the lawful use of laboratory animals in research for the benefit of society."

=== Letter bombs ===
Although no suspicious packages have yet been found, RCALB claimed in January 2009 to Indybay that they sent two UC Davis animal researchers letter bombs because of their work at the California National Primate Research Center. One of the researchers targeted said, "It worries me a little bit [...] I mean, anytime someone threatens you physically I think it causes worry." The Animal Liberation Brigade said in a communique re-released by the Animal Liberation Press Office that the act was not a hoax, with officials at the primate center claiming threats and protests have happened before and were unacceptable.

=== Vehicle firebombed ===
In the early hours of 7 March 2009, the Animal Liberation Brigade once again targeted UCLA. This time setting ablaze and destroying a car belonging to researcher J. David Jentsch. The UCLA Chancellor described the latest attack as "reprehensible", with the University raising the reward for information leading to the arrest of the activists to nearly $500,000.

== See also ==
- Leaderless resistance
- Animal rights
- Animal Liberation Front (ALF)
- Animal Rights Militia (ARM)
- Bands of Mercy
- Green Scare
- Justice Department (JD)
- Stop Huntingdon Animal Cruelty (SHAC)
