= Justice Department (animal rights) =

The Justice Department (JD) was founded in the United Kingdom by animal liberation activists who declared they were willing to use a diversity of tactics up to and including violence against their opponents. Calling for "abusers to have but a taste of the fear and anguish their victims suffer on a daily basis", activists distanced themselves from the Animal Liberation Front's guidelines of nonviolent resistance.

The first recorded action took place during Christmas 1993, when pipe bombs in poster tubes were sent to Shamrock Farm, a supplier of primates for animal experimentation. The group had formed the same leaderless-resistance model as the ALF, which consists of small, autonomous, covert cells acting independently. Members of the Justice Department are thought to include both supporters of the far-right and the far-left who engage in a common interest, which is animal rights.

The name has also been used in the United States with activists claiming hundreds of attacks in the UK against animal testing companies, their suppliers, animal researchers, hunters (including the Royal Family), and even the British National Party HQ. By sending explosive devices and razor blades in the post, and leaving incendiary devices on shelves, The Independent labeled the political violence "the most sustained and sophisticated bombing campaign in mainland Britain since the IRA was at its height." with the FBI declaring them to be "the most dangerous animal activists in operation".

== Philosophy ==
=== Manifesto ===
The Animal Liberation Front achieved what other methods have not while adhering to nonviolence. A separate idea was established that decided animal abusers had been warned long enough. ... The time has come for abusers to have but a taste of the fear and anguish their victims suffer on a daily basis.

=== Structure ===
The group formed the same leaderless-resistance model as the ALF, consisting of small, autonomous, covert cells acting independently. A cell may consist of just one person. The name is used as a tag to claim responsibility for supporters of the Justice Department concept, rather than to denote an actually existing organization. The animal liberation movement in the 1990s believed there to be less than 30 individuals as part of the Department, operating in separate cells of five or fewer people; living normal lives, normal jobs and an uncommon stereotype of a squatter.

In The Independent newspaper it was claimed that the Justice Department is regarded as the "terrorist wing" of the Animal Liberation Front (ALF). Some ALF activists reject the association, telling the newspaper: "You cannot be in favour of animal rights and at the same time attack people because at the end of the day people are animals, too."

By 1995, security forces grew concerned over not just the scale of the campaign, but also the sophistication of activists. The technology used in the bomb making was compared to that of the IRA, with hoax bombs designed to frighten the public rather than harm, although sometimes capable of maiming or killing. At the time Deputy Assistant Commissioner John Howley, overall head of both the Special Branch and the anti-terrorist branch, claimed it was not terrorism because there was no clear motive to overthrow the government.

=== Philosophy ===
The existence of activists calling themselves the Justice Department or Animal Rights Militia (ARM), another name used by violent activists, reflects a struggle within the radical animal rights movement in general, between those who believe violence is justified, and those who insist the movement should reject it in favour of nonviolent resistance. Furthermore, criticism from the mainstream animal rights movement includes comparing animal rights and the struggles to abolish slavery and emancipate women, which the League Against Cruel Sports thinks is "stupid and naive".

While the ALF is a non-violent group, Robin Webb has noted that some people may simultaneously be involved in actions staged by the Justice Department, the ALF and the ARM, since:

If someone wishes to act as the Animal Rights Militia or the Justice Department, simply put, the third policy of the ALF, to take all reasonable precautions not to endanger life, no longer applies.

==== Extensional self-defense ====
Steven Best has coined the term "extensional self-defense" to describe actions carried out in defense of animals by human beings acting as "proxy agents." He argues that, in carrying out acts of extensional self-defense, activists have the moral right to engage in acts of sabotage or even violence. Extensional self-defense is justified, he writes, because animals are "so vulnerable and oppressed they cannot fight back to attack or kill their oppressors." Best argues that the principle of extensional self-defense mirrors the penal code statues known as the "necessity defense," which can be invoked when a defendant believes that the illegal act was necessary to avoid imminent and great harm. Best says that "extensional self defense" has been put into practice in some African countries, where hired armed soldiers occasionally use lethal force against poachers who would kill rhinos, elephants and other endangered animals. In testimony to the Senate in 2005, Jerry Vlasak stated that he regarded violence against Huntingdon Life Sciences as an example of extensional self-defense.

== Direct action ==
=== 1993 ===
The first recorded Justice Department action took place during Christmas 1993, when two-foot-long poster tubes with explosive devices were sent to Shamrock Farm, a supplier of primates for animal research; the action carried claims of HIV-infected needles. Eleven more devices were intercepted by Special Branch at sorting offices with one that was not recovered. It targeted the manager of GlaxoSmithKline in Hereford, who was also a member of the RSPCA's animal experimentation advisory board and Institute of Animal Technicians council. He opened the package which exploded in his face. Days later the group targeted Boots in Cornwall, publicly stating that they had replaced products on their shelves with devices. Boots issued an alert to their eleven hundred stores after one customer bought one of the products and contacted the police who deactivated the device.

=== 1994 ===
There were at least 31 bomb attacks against hunts and their followers during 1994 and scores of others... Most of the devices are believed to have come from the Justice Department.

- The Independent

Activists working as the Justice Department have sent out letter bombs and envelopes rigged with poisoned razor blades. In 1994, a rat trap equipped with razor blades was sent to Prince Charles after he took his sons on their first foxhunt. Tom King, a former Defence Secretary, was sent an incendiary device, which failed to explode, after he defended foxhunting during a debate in parliament. Michael Howard, at the time Home Secretary, also received one.

Shortly after, the group set fire to two boats belonging to the owner of Garetmar kennels (formally known as Cottagepatch) in Hampshire and sent two videos disguised incendiary devices to the Boots store in Cambridge, which was intercepted, and another to the British National Party (BNP) HQ in South London; injuring Alfred Waite. Another round of devices by the now quite violent group were claimed to be increasingly sophisticated and random yet again injured staff, this time of ferry company Stena Sealink, which were attacked in Gloucestershire, Oxford, Edinburgh and Kent, in connection with the live exports trade. This resulted in ferry companies involved in live exports pulling out because of fear for their staff and their safety. Bloodsports enthusiast and hunt master Nick Fawcett was also one of the main targets of the Justice Department receiving several JD packages, with police blowing two up outside his home.

=== 1995 ===
The Justice Department in April were then accused of sending four letter bombs from London to senior politicians William Waldegrave (the then Minister of Agriculture, Fisheries and Food) and again to Tom King (a former Defence Secretary), a fur warehouse in Glasgow and an animal testing company in Edinburgh. Mr Waldegrave was targeted at his family farm in Chewton Mendip, Somerset, but the device was spotted by a postman and dismantled by a bomb disposal team. This was due to his apparent lack of action on banning the live exports trade and veal crates, with booby-trapped razor blades sent to his home in January, threatening letters and protests from animal rights activists. The campaign was condemned by Compassion in World Farming, while Mr Waldegrave dismissing the actions as "stupidity". The other bombs were intercepted at Westminster, a postroom and at the fur company in a controlled explosion.

=== 1996 ===
Dear animal killing scum! Hope we sliced your finger wide open and that you now die from the rat poison we smeared on the razor blade.

In January, the group claimed responsibility for sending envelopes with blades soaked in rat poison to 80 researchers, hunting guides, and others in the United States, and in British Columbia and Alberta, Canada. David Barbarash, a Vancouver-based activist who became North American spokesman for the Animal Liberation Front, was charged in connection with the attacks, but the case against him was dropped. Threats pursued in March, after the Department claimed sending out another 87 booby-trapped envelopes. the letter said: "It is unfortunate such drastic actions must be taken but in war, people die," "And we haven't even started yet.".

=== 1999 ===
In August after a few years of inactivity, a US-based group sent razor blades and a picture of a bomb from New York City to Knox County Mink Farm, Ohio. Previously targeted by the ALF in 1996 when they released 8,000 from the premises, they warned the farm that they had a year to "get out of the bloody fur trade" and release all their mink, signed by the Justice Department Anti-Fur Task Force.

By October the group had prepared 83 envelopes containing razor blades and a strongly worded warning, sent from Las Vegas, urging primate researchers in Oregon to end their work by Autumn 2000. They were warned; "If you do not heed our warning, your violence will be turned back on you." by the activists. No injuries were reported from the attacks, but the FBI swiftly classified them as the most dangerous animal activists in operation. The packages were received by researchers from UCSF, Stanford University, University of Washington, Tulane University and elsewhere. A special agent labelled the activity animal enterprise terrorism.

=== 2010 ===
A new round of threats was investigated by the FBI in November after The Justice Department of UCLA claimed they sent HIV-infected razors to UCLA neuroscientist, animal researcher and Speaking of Research member David Jentsch. He received razor blades and a threatening note law enforcement claim. The North American Animal Liberation Press Office posted an anonymous communiqué from the group, who claimed they carried out the action because Jentsch uses primates for government-funded testing of drug addiction.

Since 2006, activists have claimed numerous acts of sabotage, vandalism, criminal damage and firebombing against UCLA faculty or property, on and off campus, including the Animal Liberation Brigade setting fire to his car in March 2009. According to the university, Jentsch studies methamphetamine addiction, tobacco dependence in teenagers, and the cognitive disabilities affecting schizophrenia patients, with much of his work funded by the National Institutes of Health.

== Video bomber sentenced ==
Relating to the video disguised devices that were sent to Stena Sealink, a Coventry man, Guerjeet Aujla, was arrested by the Anti Terrorist Squad and was classified as a Category A prisoner and Justice Department bomber after clues were found in his bedroom linking him to the devices. In the case, the judge believed that he was not responsible for the other attacks, only those to the ferry company, and that his guilty plea showed genuine remorse. He was sentenced to six years imprisonment, the lowest possible sentence the judge was able to pass concerning the attacks that caused harm to individuals.

== See also ==
- Leaderless resistance
- Animal rights
- Animal Liberation Front (ALF)
- Animal Rights Militia (ARM)
- Green Scare
- Revolutionary Cells – Animal Liberation Brigade (RCALB)
