= Nicolas Atwood =

American animal rights activist

Nicolas Atwood is an American animal rights activist based in West Palm Beach, Florida. He maintains the Malaysia-registered Bite Back direct-action website, which is associated with the Animal Liberation Front.

== Background ==
Originally from Chaska, Minnesota, Atwood is a former arts promoter with a postgraduate degree in business management from New York University. He has a number of animal rights-related convictions, including criminal damage.

== SHAC and SPEAK ==
Atwood is said by The Sunday Times to have traveled to Britain to meet Greg Avery of the Stop Huntingdon Animal Cruelty (SHAC) campaign, which aims to close Huntingdon Life Sciences, a British and U.S.-based contract animal testing company.

Atwood is also allegedly involved in the SPEAK campaign to stop the construction by Oxford University of a new animal-testing laboratory, believed by animal-rights activists to include plans for a new primate facility. According to The Sunday Times, he has sent out e-mails naming Oxford academics who are targets of the animal rights movement, including Colin Blakemore, former head of the British Medical Research Council.
