= Colin Blakemore =

British neurobiologist (1944–2022)

Sir Colin Blakemore FRS FMedSci HonFRCP HonFRSM FRSB FBPhS
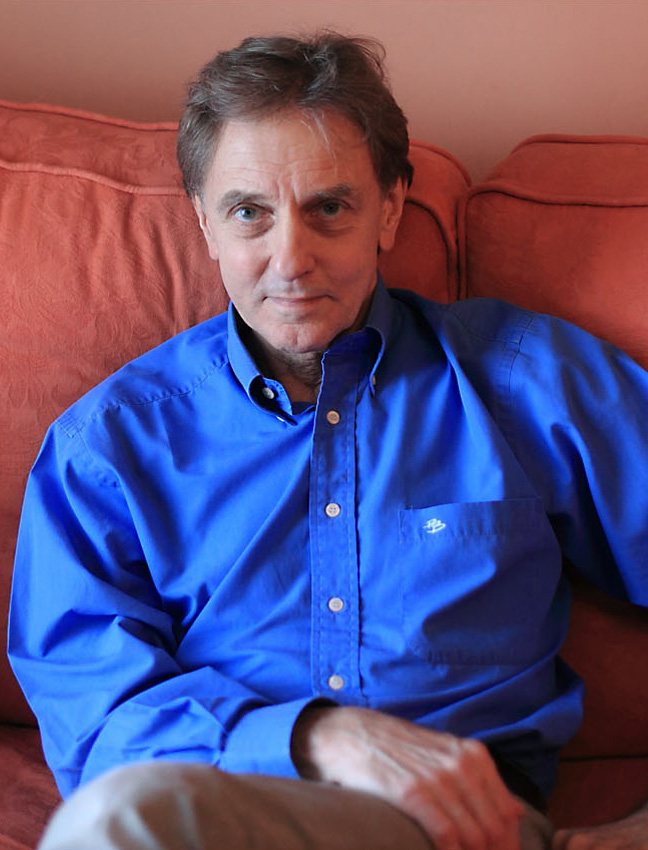
- Blakemore in 2012
- Born: Colin Brian Blakemore; 1 June 1944; Stratford-upon-Avon, England
- Died: 27 June 2022 (aged 78); Oxford, England
- Education: University of Cambridge (MA); University of California, Berkeley (PhD)
- Spouse: Andrée Elizabeth Washbourne (m. 1965; died 2022)
- Children: 3, including Sarah-Jayne Blakemore
- Scientific career
- Fields: Neurobiology; Ophthalmology
- Workplaces: University of Cambridge; University of Oxford; University of Warwick; Duke-NUS Graduate Medical School; University of London
- Thesis: Binocular Interaction in Animals and Man (1968)
- Doctoral advisor: Horace Barlow
- Doctoral students: J. Anthony Movshon

Sir Colin Blakemore (1 June 1944 – 27 June 2022) was a British neurobiologist, specialising in vision and the development of the brain. He was Yeung Kin Man Professor of Neuroscience and senior fellow of the Hong Kong Institute for Advanced Study at City University of Hong Kong. He was a distinguished senior fellow in the Institute of Philosophy, School of Advanced Study, University of London and Emeritus Professor of Neuroscience at the University of Oxford and a past Chief Executive of the British Medical Research Council (MRC). He was best known to the public as a communicator of science but also as the target of a long-running animal rights campaign. According to The Observer, he was both "one of the most powerful scientists in the UK" and "a hate figure for the animal rights movement".

== Early life and education ==
Blakemore was born in Stratford-upon-Avon, Warwickshire on 1 June 1944, the only child of Beryl Blakemore (née Smith) and Norman Blakemore. At the time, Beryl was a member of the Women's Land Army in England and Norman was in the Royal Air Force. When Blakemore was five, his father became a television repair engineer.

Blakemore began his schooling at the local primary school, but after showing unusual promise, his parents sent him to a private school, King Henry VIII School in Coventry, where he excelled in science, art, and sports. Blakemore won a state scholarship to Corpus Christi College, Cambridge, where he gained a BA degree (first-class honours) in Medical Sciences in 1965, and was promoted to an MA in 1969.

Blakemore obtained his PhD degree in physiological optics at the University of California, Berkeley, in the United States, as a Harkness Fellow in 1968. There he worked with Horace Barlow.

== Career ==
From 1968 to 1979, Blakemore was a demonstrator and then lecturer in physiology at the University of Cambridge, and director of medical studies at Downing College. From 1976 to 1979 he held the Royal Society Locke Research Fellowship.

He was appointed Waynflete Professor of Physiology and a Fellow of Magdalen College at the University of Oxford in 1979, at the age of 35. From this same university he was awarded a DSc higher degree in 1989. He was director of the James S. McDonnell and Medical Research Council Centre for Cognitive Neuroscience at the University of Oxford. He served as president of the Biosciences Federation, now the Society of Biology, the British Neuroscience Association and the Physiological Society, and as president and chairman of the British Association for the Advancement of Science, now the British Science Association. He was a Fellow of the Royal Society (FRS), the Academy of Medical Sciences (FMedSci), Academia Europaea and the European Academy of Sciences and Arts, and an Honorary Fellow of the Royal College of Physicians (HonFRCP), the Royal Society of Medicine (HonFRSM), the Institute of Biology (FRSB), the British Pharmacological Society, the Society of Biology (FBPhS), and of Corpus Christi College and Downing College, Cambridge.

In 1981, Blakemore became a founding member of the World Cultural Council.

In 2012, he was appointed director of the Institute of Philosophy's Centre for the Study of the Senses at the School of Advanced Study in London. He held an honorary professorship at the University of Warwick, and a professorship at Duke-NUS Graduate Medical School in Singapore, where he was chairman and then external scientific advisor to the Neuroscience Research Partnership.

Blakemore was a patron of Humanists UK (formerly the British Humanist Association) and an Honorary Associate of the Rationalist Association and an honorary associate of the National Secular Society. In July 2001, he was one of the signatories to a letter published in The Independent which urged the Government to reconsider its support for the expansion of maintained religious schools, and was one of the 43 scientists and philosophers who signed and sent a letter to Prime Minister Tony Blair and relevant government departments, concerning the teaching of creationism in schools in March 2002. and was one of the signatories to a letter supporting a holiday on Charles Darwin's birthday, published in The Times on 12 February 2003, and sent to the Prime Minister and the Home Secretary.

Blakemore was honoured for his scientific achievements with prizes from many academies and societies, including the Royal Society, the Swiss Academy of Medical Sciences, the French Académie Nationale de Médecine, the Royal Australian and New Zealand College of Ophthalmologists, the Royal College of Surgeons in Ireland, the BioIndustry Association and the Royal College of Physicians. In 1993, he received the Ellison-Cliffe Medal from the Royal Society of Medicine and in 1996 won the Alcon Research Institute Award for research relevant to clinical ophthalmology. He held ten Honorary Degrees from British and overseas universities and was a foreign member of several academies of science, including the Royal Netherlands Academy of Arts and Sciences, the National Academy of Sciences of India, the Indian Academy of Neurosciences, and the Chinese Academy of Engineering. He won the 2010 Royal Society Ferrier Award and Lecture. In 2001, he received the British Neuroscience Association Award for Outstanding Contribution to Neuroscience, and in 2012 the Ralph W. Gerard Prize, the highest award of the Society for Neuroscience. He chaired the Selection Committee for The Brain Prize of Grete Lundbeck's European Brain Research Prize Foundation, the world's most valuable prize for neuroscience (€1.3 million).

Blakemore first visited China in 1974, during the Cultural Revolution, and collaborated in research at the Institute of Biophysics of the Chinese Academy of Sciences in Beijing, in the late 1970s and early 1980s. His efforts to develop scientific relations between the United Kingdom and China were recognised in 2012 when he received the Friendship Award, the People's Republic of China's highest award for "foreign experts who have made outstanding contributions to the country's economic and social progress". In 2012 he was appointed a Master of the Beijing DeTao Masters Academy.

== Research ==
Blakemore's research focused on vision, the early development of the brain and, more recently, conditions such as stroke and Huntington's disease. He published scientific papers and a number of books on these subjects.

His contribution to neuroscience included his role in establishing the concept of neuronal plasticity, the capacity of the brain to reorganise itself as a result of the pattern of activity passing through its connections. in the late 1960s Blakemore was one of the first to demonstrate that the visual part of the cerebral cortex undergoes active, adaptive change during a critical period shortly after birth, and he argued that this helps the brain to match itself to the sensory environment. He went on to show that such plasticity results from changes in the shape and structure of nerve cells and the distribution of nerve fibres, and also from the selective death of nerve cells.

Although initially controversial, the idea that the mammalian brain is 'plastic' and adaptive is now a dominant theme in neuroscience. The plasticity of connections between nerve cells is thought to underlie many different types of learning and memory, as well as sensory development. The changes in organisation can be remarkably rapid, even in adults. Blakemore showed that the visual parts of the human cortex become responsive to input from the other senses, especially touch, in people who have been blind since shortly after birth. After stroke or other forms of brain injury, reorganisation of this sort can help the process of recovery, as other parts of the brain take over the function of the damaged part.

Blakemore's later work emphasized the variety of molecular mechanisms that contribute to plasticity and identified some of the genes involved in enabling nerve cells to modify their connections in response to the flow of nerve impulses through them. He summarised research on brain plasticity in his 2005 Harveian Lecture to the Royal College of Physicians and explored the role of plasticity in human cultural evolution in his 2010 Ferrier Lecture at the Royal Society. He served on the editorial board of the journal Neuroscience of Consciousness.

== Public engagement and public service ==
In parallel with his academic career, Blakemore championed the communication of science and engagement with the public on controversial and challenging aspects.

In 1976, at the age of 32, he was the youngest person to give the BBC Reith Lectures for which he presented a series of six talks entitled Mechanics of the Mind.

He subsequently presented or contributed to hundreds of radio and television broadcasts. He gave the Royal Institution Christmas Lectures in 1982–3, and wrote and presented many other programmes about science, including a 13-part series, The Mind Machine on BBC television, a radio series about artificial intelligence, Machines with Minds, and a documentary for Channel 4 television, God and the Scientists. He wrote for British and overseas newspapers, especially The Guardian, The Observer, the Daily Telegraph and The Times. He also wrote or edited several popular science books, including Mechanics of the Mind, The Mind Machine. Gender and Society, Mindwaves, Images and Understanding and The Oxford Companion to the Body. Since 2004 he was Honorary President of the Association of British Science Writers.

In 1989, when Blakemore was awarded the Royal Society's Michael Faraday Prize for his work in public communication, the citation described him as "one of Britain's most influential communicators of science". He won many other awards for his work in public communication and education, including the Phi Beta Kappa Award for contribution to the literature of science, the John P McGovern Science and Society Medal from Sigma Xi, the Edinburgh Medal from the City of Edinburgh Council and the Science Educator Award from the Society for Neuroscience.

Blakemore worked for many medical charities and not-for-profit organizations, including SANE, the International Brain Injury Association, Headway, Sense (The National Deafblind & Rubella Association), the Louise T Blouin Foundation, Sense about Science and the Pilgrim Trust. He was president of the Motor Neurone Disease Association and the Brain Tumour Charity, vice president of the Progressive Supranuclear Palsy Association and a Patron of Dignity in Dying.

He helped the Dana Foundation of New York to establish the European Dana Alliance for the Brain, an alliance of leading European neuroscientists who are committed to raising awareness of the importance of brain research. A large donation from the Dana Foundation to the Science Museum completed the funding for the Dana Centre on Queen's Gate in London, which became a focus for public engagement with science.

He was a Fellow of the World Economic Forum, and an Honorary President of the World Cultural Council, a member of the World Federation of Scientists and a patron of Humanists UK. He was a patron of the Oxford University Scientific Society and an Honorary Member of the Cambridge Union Society.

Blakemore served in an advisory role for several UK government departments and also for agencies, foundations and government departments overseas. He was a member of the Independent Expert Group on Mobile Phones (the Stewart Committee) in 1999–2000 and was an advisor to the Police Federation and the Home Office on the safety of telecommunications systems. He chaired the General Advisory Committee on Science at the Food Standards Agency and was a member of the Wilton Park Advisory Council (Foreign and Commonwealth Office). He had a long-standing interest in policy on drugs of abuse, and was a Commissioner of the UK Drug Policy Commission, an adviser to the Beckley Foundation and a Trustee of the Independent Scientific Committee on Drugs. He was an author of an influential paper published in the Lancet in 2007, introducing a rational, evidence-based system for assessing the harms of drugs, which suggested that alcohol and tobacco are more harmful than many illegal drugs. He was a member of the Longevity Science Advisory Panel of Legal & General, and sat on the European Advisory Board of Princeton University Press and served as a scientific advisor to the Technology Development Committee of Abu Dhabi.

== Humanist activism ==
Blakemore has long been publicly identified as a humanist and patron of Humanists UK, and campaigned with the organisation for a secular state and on a number of human rights and equality issues, particularly in education. He was one of over a 180 high-profile public figures to condemn the Government's plans for new 100%-selective faith schools, and earlier called for a wholesale review of the role of religion in British state schools. He was also among a number of top scientists who successfully campaigned with Humanists UK for a ban on the teaching of creationism as scientifically valid in England, and later in Wales, and for evolution to be embedded in the science curriculum.

== Animal testing and animal rights ==
Blakemore was outspoken in his support of the use of animal testing in medical research, though he publicly denounced fox hunting and animal testing for cosmetics.

He came to the attention of the animal rights movement while at Oxford University in the 1980s, when he carried out research into amblyopia and strabismus, conducting experiments that involved sewing kittens' eyelids shut from birth in order to study the development of their visual cortex. Blakemore has said of the research that it was directly applicable to humans, and that "[t]hanks to it, and similar research, we now know why conditions like amblyopia – the most common form of child blindness – occur and are now able to tackle it and think of ways of preventing it."

Subsequently, according to The Observer, he and his family "endured assaults by masked terrorists, bombs sent to his children, letters laced with razor blades, a suicide bid by his wife, and more than a decade of attacks and abuse."

In 1992, together with Les Ward of the anti-vivisection group Advocates for Animals, he co-founded a bipartisan think tank called the Boyd Group, to consider issues relating to animal experimentation.

In 1998, during the 68-day hunger strike of British animal-rights activist Barry Horne, Blakemore's life was threatened in a statement released by Robin Webb of the Animal Liberation Press Office on behalf of the Animal Rights Militia. Direct action against him has abated since the prosecution of Cynthia O'Neill for harassing him in 2000.

Blakemore advocated frank and full public debate about animal research and has worked to persuade other researchers to be more open. He was chair of the Coalition for Medical Progress, the Research Defence Society and Understanding Animal Research, an organisation devoted to making the case for responsible use of animals in research, which was launched in 2008.

== Medical Research Council ==
In 2003, Blakemore succeeded Professor Sir George Radda as the head of the Medical Research Council, a national organisation that supports medical science with an annual budget of more than £700 million. The reputation of the Medical Research Council had been damaged by what was perceived as financial mismanagement, the introduction of unpopular funding schemes and a lack of transparency in its dealings with researchers. Blakemore launched a national roadshow to consult the scientific community and quickly changed the mechanisms for handling funds, rationalised the grant schemes, introduced new forms of support for young researchers and overhauled the communications policies of the MRC.

He maintained his research activity in Oxford during his period of office and said "I want to be seen as the scientist, not the bureaucrat at the top. No, I want to be seen as the scientist in the middle."

Blakemore initiated a comprehensive review of the MRC's strategy and argued for a stronger commitment to clinical research and to the translation of basic research into benefits for patients. These actions anticipated Sir David Cooksey's 2006 "Review of UK health research funding", which resulted in closer working between the MRC and the Departments of Health, but which recommended that "funding levels for basic science should be sustained". In the Comprehensive Spending Review at the end of Blakemore's term of office, the budget of the MRC was increased by more than one third over three years. He was succeeded at the MRC by Leszek Borysiewicz.

On the completion of his appointment at the MRC in 2007, Blakemore returned to a Professorship of Neuroscience at Oxford before his appointment at the University of London in 2012.

=== Honours controversy ===
Soon after his appointment to the MRC The Sunday Times published a leaked British Cabinet Office document that suggested he was deemed unsuitable for inclusion in the 2004 New Year's Honours List because of his research on animals – research considered "controversial" by a British government committee that oversees matters of science and technology despite being widely supported by political leaders and the public. In response, he threatened to resign, suggesting in interviews that his position as chief executive was now untenable:

It's a matter of principle. The mission statement of the MRC is explicit. There's a specific commitment to talk to the public about issues in medical research. How can I now go to our scientists, and ask them to risk talking about animal research, when there now appears to be evidence that in secret the government disapproves it, even though in public they've strongly encouraged it?

A parliamentary inquiry investigating the matter implicated the Honours Committee's subcommittee for science and technology chaired by Sir Richard Mottram. After expressions of support for animal experimentation from then Prime Minister Tony Blair; Chief Scientific Adviser David King; Minister for Science Lord Sainsbury; and the wider scientific community, Blakemore withdrew his threat to resign.

Until 2014, he was the only MRC chief executive unrecognised by the British honours system. He was knighted in the 2014 Birthday Honours for services to scientific research, policy, and outreach.

=== National Institute for Medical Research taskforce ===
In 2003 the MRC announced plans to consider moving the National Institute for Medical Research, its largest research facility, from Mill Hill in North London to a new site in central London. As part of the consultation process a taskforce was convened, with Blakemore as chairman, to consider options for the size and location of the new NIMR. During the process a number of senior staff at NIMR, including the then director, Sir John Skehel, opposed a move being proposed as the only option, saying "staying at Mill Hill should be considered."

Robin Lovell-Badge, a scientist at NIMR who was a member of the taskforce, proposed this option be included in the official publication of the taskforce, something that Blakemore and the majority of other members were opposed to. After disagreeing on the issue, Lovell-Badge alleged Blakemore had twice attempted to "coerce" him into agreement by threatening his job. Blakemore denied the allegations, describing them as "pure invention".

A House of Commons select committee investigated the claims. They found "no specific credible evidence" to support the complaint, reporting the allegation "would have carried more weight had it been made at the time rather than in public during the final stages of the decision making process when relations between NIMR and MRC management had fallen into mutual animosity". The committee criticised Blakemore for "heavy-handed" lobbying of other taskforce members and reported that a "more independent" figure than Blakemore should have chaired the taskforce. The report also criticised unnamed senior NIMR staff for an attempt at "undermining Blakemore's position".

The MRC maintained its commitment to relocate the NIMR and entered into partnership with the Wellcome Trust, Cancer Research UK, University College London, Imperial College London and King's College London, to create the Francis Crick Institute on a site adjacent to the British Library and St Pancras Station in central London.

== Personal life and death ==
Blakemore had a duodenal ulcer during his teens, and a second in his third year at university, requiring a gastrectomy that removed half of his stomach. He almost died from bleeding caused by the ulcers. He developed a lifelong interest in fitness and sport, especially long-distance running. He completed 18 marathons and won the veteran's section for the British team at the Athens Centenary Marathon in 1996.

He was married to Andrée Elizabeth Washbourne. The couple first met when they were 15 years old, and were married from 1965 until her death in January 2022. They had three daughters: Sarah-Jayne (herself a notable cognitive neuroscientist), Sophie, and Jessica. Andrée suffered distress due to the animal rights activism against her husband.

Blakemore was an atheist.

Blakemore was diagnosed with motor neurone disease in 2021, and died at Sobell House Hospice in Oxford on 27 June 2022, at the age of 78.

Preceded by Edmond H. Fischer	Honorary President of the World Cultural Council; 17 November 2014 – 27 June 2022	Succeeded by Fraser Stoddart
