= Behind the Mask (2006 film) =

Behind the Mask: The Story of the People Who Risk Everything to Save Animals
- Directed by: Shannon Keith
- Produced by: Shannon Keith
- Starring: Greg Avery; Steven Best; Mel Broughton; Rod Coronado; John Curtin; Chris DeRose; John Feldmann; Kevin Kjonaas; Ronnie Lee; Keith Mann; Ingrid Newkirk; Jerry Vlasak; Paul Watson; Robin Webb
- Edited by: Sandra Mohr
- Distributed by: Uncaged Films and ARME (Animal Rescue, Media & Education)
- Release date: March 21, 2006
- Running time: 72 minutes
- Country: United States
- Language: English

Behind the Mask: The Story of the People Who Risk Everything to Save Animals is a 2006 documentary film about the Animal Liberation Front (ALF). It took three years of filming, interviewing, and editing to complete. The movie was created by animal rights lawyer Shannon Keith, who owns Uncaged Films and ARME (Animal Rescue, Media & Education).

== About ==
The film is about animal rights activists who break into laboratories and other facilities to obtain footage of the way animals are used. It includes well-known names within the animal rights movement, some of whom have been imprisoned for taking direct action. According to the film's producer Shannon Keith, a lawyer, "change only happens in society when laws are broken", and according to arsonist Melanie Arnold who set ablaze a slaughterhouse, "If I had an opportunity, I would do it again since economic damage to animal abusers is justifiable."
