= Shannon Keith =

American lawyer and filmmaker

Shannon Keith is an American animal rights lawyer, activist, and documentary director/producer. She is the director of the Animal Liberation Front documentary, Behind the Mask: The Story Of The People Who Risk Everything To Save Animals.

== Early life and education ==
Keith grew up in Los Angeles, California.

== Career ==
Keith became an animal rights activist, documentary filmmaker, and animal rights lawyer.

Keith has represented several well-known animal-rights activists and campaigns, including Stop Huntingdon Animal Cruelty (SHAC) and Kevin Kjonaas, the former president of SHAC USA, against Huntingdon Life Sciences, and the Sea Shepherd Conservation Society.

In 2000, she obtained the largest settlement against the City of Los Angeles for the beating to death of a dog by a city employee.

In 2004, Shannon started a non-profit, called Animal Rescue Media Education (ARME). The organization rescues homeless animals and focuses on stopping the problem at its roots through educational initiatives, including making documentaries about animals and animal activists.

== Beagle Freedom Project ==
Keith founded Beagle Freedom Project and its predecessor companies. Founded in 2004 as "ARME (Animal Rescue, Media & Education)", in 2018 it changed its name to "Rescue + Freedom Project" with Kevin Kjonaas as secretary, and in 2019 was changed to "Beagle Freedom Project".

== See also ==
- List of animal rights advocates
