= GANDALF trial =

1997 UK trial of the editors of Green Anarchist magazine

GANDALF was an acronym (Green Anarchist and ALF) for the 1997 trial in the United Kingdom of the editors of Green Anarchist magazine, as well as two prominent British supporters of the Animal Liberation Front and Animal Liberation Front Supporters Group (ALF SG), on charges of conspiracy to incite criminal damage.

Beginning in 1995, the Hampshire police under "Operation Washington" began a series of at least 56 raids, which resulted in the August–November 1997 trial in Portsmouth of Green Anarchist editors Stephen Booth, Saxon Burchnall-Wood, Noel Molland, and Paul Rogers, as well as ALF press officer Robin Webb and ALF SG newsletter editor Simon Russell. The defendants organized the GANDALF defence campaign.

On 14 November 1997, three of the editors of Green Anarchist, Steve Booth, Saxon Burchnall-Wood and Noel Molland were jailed for three years for conspiracy to incite criminal damage. The jury acquitted Simon Russell. After four and a half months, all three were released pending an appeal, and their convictions were overturned.

During the subsequent appeal, the appeal judges commented "the sentencing remarks show that the judge took a very serious view indeed of the ‘terrorism’ advocated by some of the more extreme publications."

On 26 November 1998, the cases against Rogers and Webb were dismissed on the grounds that the charges were wrongly worded. The Times newspaper reported that the Crown Prosecution Service had been "accused of wasting millions of pounds."

The presiding judge at the trial was David Selwood, who in 2012 would be convicted of offences relating to child pornography.

Following the trial, "the government adopted an approach that focused on further criminalizing animal rights activists’ behavior by strengthening existing legislation and introducing new police powers".
