= Oxford University Scientific Society =

- Founded: 1882
- Website: ouscisoc.org

The Oxford University Scientific Society (OUSS) is a student scientific society at the University of Oxford. It was founded in 1882 as the Oxford University Junior Scientific Club. It is one of the oldest undergraduate science societies in the world. It organizes talks on scientific subjects on a weekly basis.

Former speakers include Nobel prize laureates (John E. Walker, Peter Mansfield, Peter J. Ratcliffe) and other well-known scientists (Roger Penrose, Richard Dawkins).

OUSS also organizes visits to places of scientific interest, which have included tours of the Bodleian Library, Museum of the History of Science, TOAD distillery in Oxford, the Joint European Torus project, and the National Space Centre in Leicester. In April 2012 they held a large-scale debate on gerontology at the Sheldonian Theatre between Aubrey de Grey and Colin Blakemore, chaired by Sir Richard Peto.

== History ==
Oxford University increased its provision for science in the second half of 19th century, with the first scientific degree awarded in 1850. A number of scientific ventures were undertaken, including the building of the Pitt Rivers Museum and the Clarendon Lab, and the proportion of undergraduates doing a scientific degree increased every year.

Oxford University Junior Scientific Club was founded in November 1882. At that time there were around 25 students admitted to a scientific course every year (they accounted for 7% of the student body) and most of them soon joined the newly formed society. Edward Poulton and Halford Mackinder were among its founders. The Club aimed to "bring together undergraduate and bachelor of arts members of the University for the discussion of scientific matters". After one year four fifths of students studying science were members of the club, and it also attracted members studying non-scientific disciplines. Graduates often stayed connected with the club after leaving the university. In 1889 it had 102 members, and in 1894, around 200, and this number stayed approximately the same until the First World War.

During first 30 years of its existence the club served as a platform to integrate science undergraduates as well as recent graduates and allowed them to present their original research. Although the society invited senior university members and distinguished academics to speak during so-called "special meetings", its main events were the fortnightly "ordinary meetings", in which papers about recent developments in science or about original research were read. Originally around half of those papers were read by current undergraduates, although it changed with time in favour of the graduate speakers. With no research degrees in Oxford, the ordinary meetings were one of the few opportunities for graduates to arouse interest about their scientific work. Famous students involved in those early years of the Junior Scientific Club include Nevil Sidgwick, Frederick Soddy, Henry Moseley and Julian Huxley.

Special meetings with distinguished academics developed into an annual series of "Boyle Lectures", endowed and published from the society's subscription. Among the people who delivered those lectures were William Ramsay, Lord Kelvin and Henry Acland. Some of those lectures have been subsequently made into books. Once every two years the Club organized science festivals, called "conversaziones", in the Pitt Rivers Museum. Conversaziones comprised popular-level lectures and exhibitions in Pitt Rivers. They attracted around 1000 people from around Oxford. One of such conversaziones was described in the journal Nature from 6 July 1936.

The club published its own journal, the Journal of the Oxford University Junior Scientific Club. It was edited every term from 1887 to 1912 and also after the First World War. Its style and composition were similar to other contemporary science periodicals, with some numbers containing as many as 100 pages. The articles were devoted to the papers read at the society's meetings or to general scientific developments. The journal also contained notes about current and former members of the club. In 1897 it was renamed Transactions of the Oxford University Junior Scientific Club.

By the beginning of the 20th century some specialized scientific societies were set up in Oxford and they were better suited for presenting undergraduate's research work. The quality of postgraduate teaching also improved. Those changes brought forth a shift in the activities of the Junior Scientific Club in 1920s. It concentrated mainly on inviting high-profile scientific speakers. This has remained the society's activity up to the present day.

The society's archives are largely available in the Bodleian Library.

== People ==
The Senior Member is Professor Kay Davies, FRS (Genetics). The following are patrons:

- Peter Atkins (Chemistry)
- Colin Blakemore (Physiology)
- Marcus du Sautoy (Mathematics)
- Sir Roger Penrose (Mathematics)
