= Oxford Arson Squad =

Militant animal rights organization

Oxford Arson Squad (or Oxford Arson Group) is a militant animal rights organization, which emerged in the United Kingdom in 2005 after claiming the firebombing of the Corpus Christi College Sports Pavilion at Oxford University. The university denounced these acts of direct action stating that "the intimidating nature of this message is totally unacceptable".

== Mission statement ==
The Oxford Arson Squad first established itself when an anonymous message was sent to Bite Back claiming the failed arson at Corpus Christi College on 23 September 2005, stating:

- We have spent 15 months researching you, and we know every weakness you have.
- You have people within your ranks acting against you.
- You cannot build the South Parks Lab without incurring massive losses.
- We are stronger than you, we have more resolve than you and we never give up!
- If we have to destroy every bit of property you own we will, in order to stop you inflicting your profit driven cruelties on defenceless creatures.
- You cannot stop us, we are free to attack you at will, whenever and wherever we choose!

== Philosophy ==
The initials of the Animal Liberation Front with an anarchist circle-A incorporated into the design

The activists use the same leaderless-resistance model as the Animal Liberation Front (ALF), which consists of small, autonomous, covert cells acting independently. A cell may consist of just one person.

Their cause seems to be to inflict property damage, presumably arson, but not injure individuals, and is a reason why they have been accused of being members or supporters of the ALF.

The targets have been businesses based in Oxford, and the surrounding areas, using incendiary devices to firebomb businesses they assume have financial ties with Oxford University.

== Direct action ==
=== Longbridges boathouse fire ===
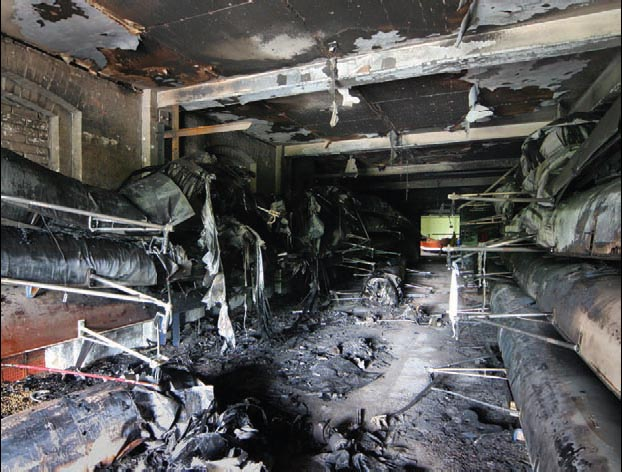
View of the devastation from the fire that caused £500,000 damage to Londbridges boathouse, Oxfordshire on 4 July 2005.

The group became known after the first arson in Oxford which caused an estimated £500,000 worth of damage on 4 July 2005. In response to this attack, with the insurance premiums set to rise for the business, Longbridge's boathouse were given corporate sponsorship and donations.

The fire caused 26 boats in total to become unusable which were part of St Hilda's, St Catherine's, Hertford, Mansfield and St Benet's Hall boats and boat clubs. Upon investigation the cause of the fire was attributed to incendiary devices which had been placed in the Eight's bays. The group stated that they targeted the boathouse because of their apparent ties to Oxford University that use primates in experiments. The group in a posting to Bite Back said,

"From here on nothing you own, rent or have dealings with is off limits until the project is scrapped, To warn builders and suppliers that they are going to get some, even if their involvement comes to light years later we will not let you off the hook!"

Ed Mayne, spokesman for Oxford University replied,

"We are appalled by the contents of a statement concerning the fire in an Oxford College boathouse. The intimidating nature of this message is totally unacceptable."

=== Failed attempts ===
Two arsons were unsuccessful with an incendiary device found deactivated at Christ Church College's Sport Pavilion, despite the group claiming they had targeted Corpus Christi College in July 2005. The second device at Oxford's Templeton College in February 2007 was found also deactivated. Again the group claimed to have carried out an arson attack, saying again in an anonymous communique to Bite Back:

"This latest action is part of an ongoing campaign against the University of Oxford and its continued usage of animal testing."

=== Other arsons ===
In November 2006, there was an arson at Queen's College, this was again claimed to be because of the financial relationship with Oxford University. The Animal Liberation Front consists of small autonomous groups of people all over the world who carry out direct action according to the ALF guidelines. Any group of people who are vegetarians or vegans and who carry out actions according to ALF guidelines have the right to regard themselves as part of the ALF. A message was sent to the Bite Back website stating,

ALF volunteers gained access to the roof of the building and after removing a section of roof tiling placed an incendiary device containing 12 litres of fuel inside. Attacks will escalate in the face of an institution and government which have sought to destroy legal protest and continue to sanction violence to animals

Similar attacks occurred nearly a year later in November 2007, when the ALF alleged vehicles belonging to a researcher of the Department of Experimental Psychology at Oxford University were firebombed as well as a director of Acorn Integrated systems sports car, who the group accused of aiding the construction of the laboratory. The group said in a message to Bite Back: "There will be more. For Barry and Felix.".

== See also ==
- Leaderless resistance
- Animal Liberation Front (ALF)
- SPEAK
- Western Animal Rights Network (WARN)
- Animal testing
- Animal rights
