= Speciesism: The Movie =

2013 American documentary film

- Directed by: Mark Devries
- Starring: Peter Singer; Richard Dawkins; Temple Grandin; Bruce Friedrich; Steven Best
- Release date: September 18, 2013
- Country: United States
- Language: English

Speciesism: The Movie is a 2013 documentary film by American director Mark Devries. It explores the concept and practice of speciesism, the assignment of value to beings on the basis of species membership.

The film features interviews with, among others, Peter Singer, Richard Dawkins, Gary Francione, Temple Grandin, and Steven Best, along with material shot in and around factory farms in the United States.

== See also ==
- Animal rights
- Earthlings (film)
- List of vegan and plant-based media
- Unity (film)
- Veganism
