= Animal Rights Militia =

Banner used by some animal rights activists

- Founded: 1982
- Founder: Unknown
- Purpose: Animal rights
- Location(s): Europe and North America
- Origins: England
- Method: Direct action

The Animal Rights Militia (ARM) is a banner used by animal rights activists who engage in direct action utilizing a diversity of tactics that ignores the Animal Liberation Front's policy of taking all necessary precautions to avoid harm to human life.

== Background ==
=== History ===
When the Animal Rights Militia first emerged in the United Kingdom their focus was on illegal direct action. Utilizing tactics such as the destruction of property, intimidation, and including the use of violence, the ARM have sent letter bombs, placed incendiary devices under cars and in buildings, contaminated food products, sent death threats, and desecrated a grave.

The ARM claimed responsibility for a 1987 arson attack in California, and a series of arsons, hoax bombs and threats in the 1990s and 2000s, including in the Isle of Wight, Cambridge, North Yorkshire and Oxford. The damage caused by fires averaged £2 million in each location. ARM activists continue to report actions in European countries, North America and Australia. Similar to the ALF, activists send anonymous claims of responsibility to Bite Back Magazine, a website supportive of the animal liberation movement and its prisoners.

=== Structure ===
The ARM formed the same leaderless-resistance model as the Animal Liberation Front. A cell may consist of just one person. The existence of activists calling themselves the Animal Rights Militia or Justice Department reflects a struggle within the Animal Liberation Front and the animal rights movement in general, between those who believe violence is justified, and those who insist the movement should reject it in favor of non-violent resistance.

== Actions ==
History

The Animal Rights Militia is believed to be a splinter group of the Animal Liberation Front.

=== 1980s ===
1982

The first action became known on November 30 when five letter bombs were sent to Margaret Thatcher, then British prime minister, the Home Office minister responsible for animal legislation, as well as the leaders of Britain's three main opposition parties, signed by the Animal Rights Militia. The office manager to Thatcher suffered superficial burns on his hands and face when opening the package that burst into flames. It was later reported that the 8-by-4 inch package filled with gunpowder that exploded evaded Post Office scanners, causing a tightening in mail security at 10 Downing Street. Scotland Yard led the investigation stating, "We are now connecting all five letter-bombs with the same organisation."

1983

In February, four months after the attack against politicians, five more letter bombs were sent to different addresses in London, England, claimed again by the ARM. In an action apparently to protest the annual seal hunt in Newfoundland, Canada, the explosives were delivered to the Canadian High Commission, the then Agriculture minister, a surgeon and a furrier. This time, however, as the padded envelopes were defused, there were no injuries.

1985

In September, incendiary devices were placed under the cars of two animal researchers for BIBRA (British Industrial Biological Research Association) in South London, which completely wrecked both vehicles. ARM then claimed the contamination of Mars products, claiming it was because of their animal experiments relating to tooth decay which ARM claimed the company had no intention of ending. ARM then claimed the contamination was a hoax and they had not carried out the action. But claimed that it had caused huge financial damage which was the intention.

1986

Three months later in January, ARM claimed responsibility for placing incendiary devices under cars of four individuals involved in animal research at Huntingdon Life Sciences. The explosives were placed in Harrogate, South London, Staffordshire and Sussex, timed to explode an hour apart from each other. This time, also the last time according to the cell, the bomb disposal team were alerted, who deactivated the devices that were confirmed to be live. The next attack the ARM claimed was intended to kill Dr Andor Sebesteny, an animal researcher for the Imperial Cancer Research Fund (ICRF). However he noticed the device that was attached under his car which saved his life, since no warning had been given. ARM also claimed responsibility for sending more letter bombs to individuals involved in vivisection.

1987

On 1 September, at San Jose Valley Veal & Beef, Santa Clara, California, the ARM claims responsibility for an arson which cost $10,000 in damages.

=== 1990s ===
1992

On 4 January 1992, the Edmonton Journal reported of an ARM action claimed by a letter and sent to the journal, as well as the Canadian Press. The cell said they injected 87 of the month-old food bar, the Canadian Cold Buster, with liquid oven cleaner, resulting in the product being pulled from shelves in Alberta, Canada. The ARM claimed in the letter, along with two bars, the contamination was due to the slaughter of thousands of rats, injected with various drugs, frozen and starved, "...because of the decade-and-a-half-long history of animal suffering that is this candy's history." The police at the time advised against consuming the food bar, unsure whether the action was genuine. The candy bars sent to the media were later confirmed to have been injected with saline solution (harmless sterilised table salt), proving to be a hoax.

1994

On 6 July, it was reported widely that the Cambridge store of Boots and also the Edinburgh Woolen Mill in the centre of the city had caught on fire. The Boots branch burnt for four hours completely destroying the building and the wool clothing store was badly damaged with the entire stock ruined. Two more devices were then found, both leather shops, one of which was in the pocket of a sheepskin coat. The ARM claimed all four devices, causing Cambridge city centre to be cordoned off whilst officers searched for two more devices that the cell claimed would explode the following day at 12pm. After an extensive search, it was concluded that the additional two devices claimed were a hoax, with no further devices exploding the following day. A month later, another leather shop was destroyed and the same wool mill suffered minor damage after devices went off, with two more recovered in leather shops and one in a fur shop.

ARM then set fire to shops on the Isle of Wight two week later, causing £3 million worth of damage. Initially an incendiary device had been found in a fishing tackle shop as a customer tried on a jacket, accidentally discovering the cigarette packet explosive. The police were called and seized the jacket for forensic tests, alerting all other fishing tackle shops in the island. However four further devices had been planted in Ryde and Newport, with the next one found in Halfords, a subsidiary of Boots, that was detonated in a controlled explosion. The three remaining devices then ignited in the early hours of the morning, setting ablaze two leather shops and an Imperial Cancer Research Fund (ICRF) shop, as a hundred firefighters attended to the fires.

Throughout the rest of the year extensive damage continued to occur elsewhere, most notably in the other end of the country in North Yorkshire by the ARM. Boots in Harrogate and Fads, another Boots subsidiary, were set on fire, followed by another ICRF shop and a bloodsports shop. In York, a newly refurbished Boots and Fads were again targeted by arsonists, causing a less but still severe damage to the properties.

On Christmas Day, the ARM then claimed in writing to two of Vancouver's biggest chains, Save-On Foods and Canada Safeway, that they had injected rat poison into turkeys in supermarkets. Evidence of contamination was not found.

1998

ARM further came to widespread public attention in the UK in December, during one of Horne's hunger strikes, which lasted 68 days. It was carried out in protest at the British government's refusal to order a commission of inquiry into animal testing, and ARM threatened to assassinate a number of individuals involved in vivisection should Horne die. Those threatened were Colin Blakemore, later chief executive of the Medical Research Council; Clive Page of King's College London, a professor of pulmonary pharmacology and chair of the animal science group of the British Biosciences Federation; Mark Matfield of the Research Defence Society; and Christopher Brown, the owner of Hillgrove Farm in Oxfordshire, who was breeding kittens for laboratories.

=== 2004–2007 ===
2005

Following the announced in August that the Hall family were no longer breeding guinea pigs for medical research, the ARM sent letters to the homes of 17 company directors associated with HLS. Most of the companies targeted were building contractors based in Peterborough, Huntingdon, and Harrogate. A letter from the ARM activists said:

The company you work for is working with Huntingdon Life Sciences. This is a disgusting and cowardly act. You have a choice. You can walk away from those sick monsters or you can personally face the consequences of your decision. Not only you but your family is a target. Sever your links with HLS within two weeks or get ready for your life and the lives of those you love to become a living hell.

Two weeks after the letters were sent in late September, nine companies, more than half, severed their ties with HLS.

2006

Four people were convicted on 11 May for their involvement in what The Guardian called "a six-year hate campaign" that included letter bombs, vandalism and grave robbing. The judge described the group's actions as "subjecting wholly innocent citizens to a campaign of terror." The campaign included hate mail signed Animal Rights Militia (ARM) and Animal Liberation Front (ALF). Those convicted were Jon Ablewhite, John Smith and Kerry Whitburn each of whom who were given twelve year sentences and Josephine Mayo who was sentenced to four years.

2007

On 30 August, ARM claimed to have deliberately contaminated 250 tubes of Novartis's widely used antiseptic Savlon in shops including Superdrug, Tesco and Boots The Chemist who all withdrew sales of the cream. The cell claimed in a communique to Bite Back:

We don't want to kill living beings like Novartis but the side effects and the inevitable hospital stay will give people an idea of what Novartis pays for inside Huntingdon Life Sciences. The message is clear and uncompromising Vasella, you must stop killing animals inside Huntingdon Life Sciences or this will only be the beginning of our campaign.

== Convictions ==
1988

Paul Scare was sentenced to one year in prison for sending razor blades to the people who he had targeted.

1994

Barry Horne was subsequently jailed for eighteen years for the arson attacks. The prosecution successfully argued that the devices used in Bristol and the Isle of Wight were so similar that Horne should be regarded as responsible for both, despite only pleading guilty to an attempted arson in Bristol. Robin Webb, who runs the Animal Liberation Press Office in the UK, narrowly avoided being charged with conspiracy.

1995

Niel Hanson was sentenced to three years for sending the hoax device to GlaxoSmithKline public relations officer in Hertfordshire. He was initially charged with conspiracy to murder, which was then revised to a lesser crime and he was re-sentenced to serve three years, for the device that was a bag of cat litter sent via taxi.

== See also ==
- Leaderless resistance
- Animal rights
- Green Scare
- Revolutionary Cells – Animal Liberation Brigade (RCALB)
