= Animal Liberation Press Office =

Press office for several animal rights clandestine cells

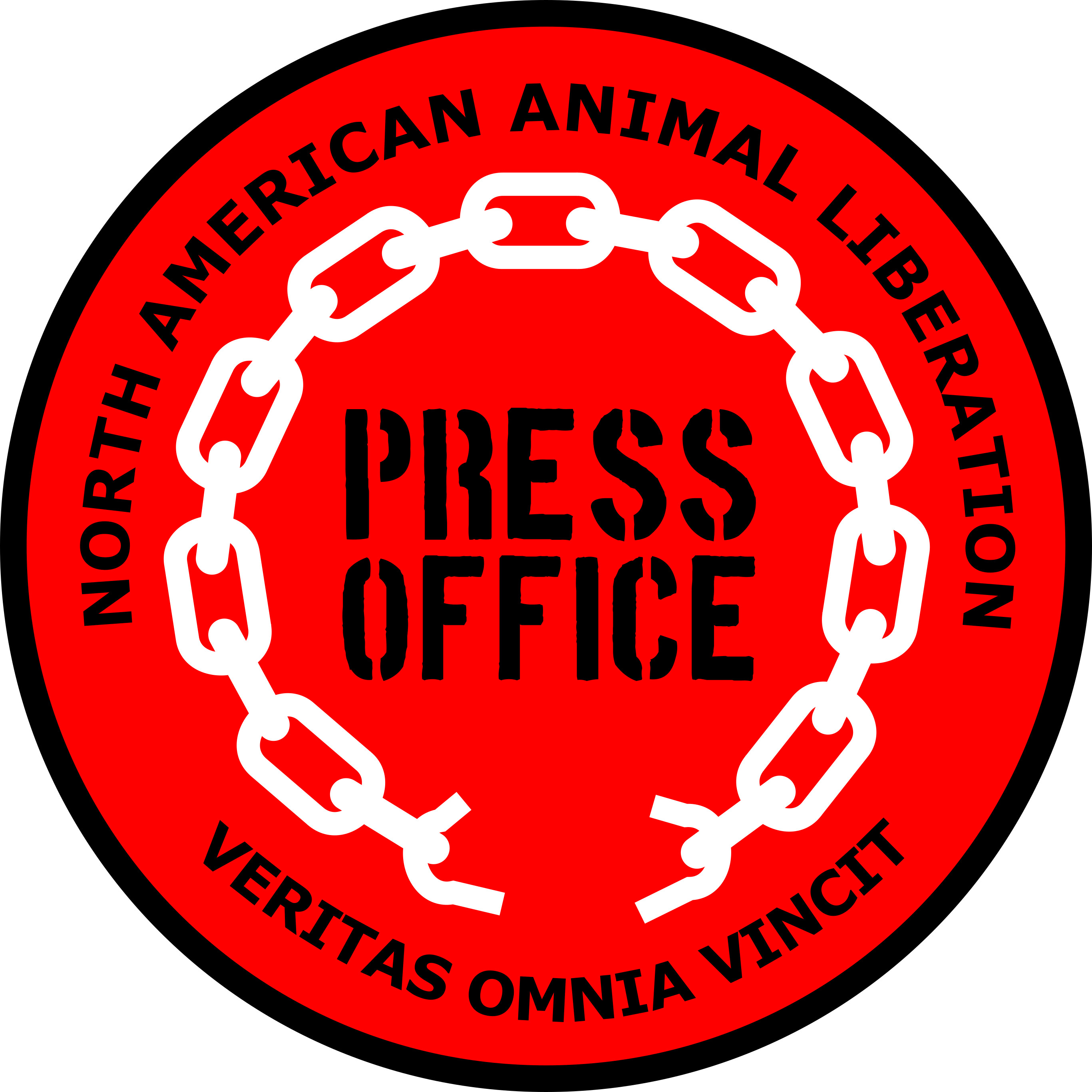
North American Animal Liberation Press Office logo

Animal Liberation Press Offices relay anonymous communiques, photos, and videos to the media about direct action undertaken by the Animal Liberation Front (ALF), Animal Rights Militia (ARM), Revolutionary Cells – Animal Liberation Brigade, Justice Department, and other leaderless resistance within the animal liberation movement. It states that it will "explain and seek to justify any action, whatever it may be", so long as it appears to have been carried out "with the sincere intention of furthering animal liberation." The North American press office also includes a newsletter, prisoner list and merchandise page.

The press office's position is that it receives claims of responsibility from anonymous cells, and that its officers "do not engage in illegal activities, nor do they know any individuals who do." In contrast, a British High Court judge described press officer Robin Webb as a "central and pivotal figure" in the ALF.

== Offices ==
=== United Kingdom ===
The first press office was founded in the UK in October 1991. Media relations were originally handled by the Animal Liberation Front Supporters Group, but a new ALF press office was created to receive claims of responsibility anonymously, in order to avoid charges of conspiracy. The name was changed again, this time to the Animal Liberation Press Office, after the introduction of the Terrorism Act 2000, in order to avoid police attention, and to reflect that the office issues statements on behalf of a number of activist groups, not just the ALF.

Robin Webb, formerly a member of the RSPCA ruling council, runs the office in the UK.

=== North America ===
The press office in North America, also known as NAALPO, was co-founded in 1994, and re-opened in December 2004, by Steven Best, an associate professor of philosophy at the University of Texas, El Paso. The current press officers are:

- Jerry Vlasak – Trauma surgeon and former animal researcher
- Gary Yourofsky - North American press officer, lecturer and founder of ADAPTT
- Joseph Buddenberg - North American press officer
- Gregston Van Pukeston - Press Officer/Journalist with R9 Media/Press Office Liaison for Environmental Action/Activist Groups.
- Elgin James - North American press officer advisor, musician, writer, director, and producer in film and television.

== Relationship with the ALF ==
The acronym ALF within the anarchy-A symbol

In October 2006, the distinction between the British Animal Liberation Press Office and the ALF was questioned when a High Court judge ruled that Robin Webb was bound by an injunction banning protests at Oxford University. Webb had argued that he was a journalist and not a member of the ALF or its supporters group. According to The Guardian, the judge described Webb as a "central and pivotal figure [in the ALF]," and concluded that "the press office was not a neutral reporting exercise or even simply a vehicle for apologists for the ALF, but a vital part of the ALF's strategy." In contrast, the North American press office claims:

If the Press Office had any direct dealings with the underground, knew who the members of underground groups were, or were members ourselves, law enforcement would not hesitate to charge and imprison us. The Press Office frequently receives communiques anonymously from these underground groups, and passes them along to the media, but has no personal knowledge of who sends them or from where they are sent.

== See also ==
- Bite Back, Malaysia-registered website and magazine
- Earth Liberation Front (ELF)
- Earth Liberation Prisoner Support Network (ELPSN)
- List of animal rights groups
- Resistance: Journal of the Earth Liberation Movement, environmentalist magazine
- Vegan Prisoner Support Group (VPSG)
