= Auckland Animal Action =

New Zealand animal rights organisation

Auckland Animal Action's logo.

Auckland Animal Action (AAA) is an animal rights advocacy organisation, based in Auckland, formed in August 1996, by a small group of people seeing the need for a grassroots activist group that promoted direct action against all forms of animal abuse. Since then, AAA has run campaigns against all forms of animal abuse, most notably the Fur Free Auckland campaign.

== Factory Farming ==
AAA has also been active against factory farming. Actions have included investigations into alleged factory farms, protests outside these farms and campaigns against companies, including Tegel Foods Limited.

AAA also promotes and organises the media coverage for investigations carried out by underground groups. In January 2007 AAA received nationwide media coverage for an investigation and release of animals carried out by the Animal Liberation Front.

== Civil Disobedience ==
In 2003 AAA used Civil Disobedience in their campaign against Harpers Fashion's sale of fur products. Members of AAA chained themselves to the door of the Hartley's store in High Street.

== Possum Fur Campaign ==
AAA oppose possum fur marketed as eco-friendly. This policy was accompanied by protests at the 2005 New Zealand Fashion Week. Rochelle Rees from AAA believes: "...the promotion of possum fur would lead to an unsustainable demand, as it had with rabbits and foxes." In 2005 Auckland Animal Action launched a campaign against possum fur.

Criticism of AAA's anti-possum fur policy comes from David Farrar who says, "I see the Auckland Animal Action Group justify their opposition to use of possum fur, because "to wear a dead animal's skin is disrespectful to the animal". Well killing our trees is disrespectful also, and the possums started it!"

== See also ==
- Animal welfare in New Zealand
