= Bite Back =

Malaysian-registered website and magazine

Bite Back Magazine #12. The front cover features one of the twenty-two broiler chickens taken from Lloyds Animal Feeds in Wiltshire, England, with an ALF activist on November 3rd 2006.

Bite Back is a Malaysian-registered website and magazine that promotes the cause of the animal liberation movement, and specifically the Animal Liberation Front (ALF). According to The Sunday Times, the name is inspired by an arson campaign targeting the American fur industry throughout the 1990s.

Its founder and editor, Nicolas Atwood, has said that Bite Back's mission is to "support animal rights prisoners of conscience and report on current events in the struggle."

The website also receives anonymous communiques of political Justice, including those by the Animal Rights Militia (ARM), Justice Department and Animal Liberation Brigade.

== Background ==
Bite Back was set up in 2001 by Atwood, an animal rights activist in West Palm Beach, Florida. In March 2005, Atwood set up a Florida-based company, Bite Back Inc, to operate the site and magazine sales.

== Magazine ==
As of February 2021, the magazine's website notes that the magazine is being published on an irregular schedule and no new subscriptions are being accepted.

== Forum ==
The initials of the Animal Liberation Front with an anarchist circle-A incorporated into the design

Bite Back acts as a forum for ALF activists, and a place they can leave claims of responsibility for direct action taken in pursuit of animal liberation. In 2006, it was used to encourage attacks against Oxford University, publishing personal details of academics and calling on supporters to "do whatever it takes" to "blow these fucking monsters off the planet".

In 2007, when incendiary devices were found at Templeton College, Oxford, Bite Back reported a claim of responsibility on behalf of the Animal Liberation Front: "This latest action is part of an ongoing fight against the University of Oxford and its continued reign of terror over the unseen victims inside its animal labs."

The FBI, while reportedly aware of the site, say action against it would breach the First Amendment protecting freedom of speech.

In 2005, Bite Back published a "Direct Action Report," listing action carried out by activists on a global scale. It writes that, in 2004, 17,262 animals were liberated, and 554 acts of sabotage, vandalism and arson were carried out.

== See also ==
- Arkangel Magazine
- No Compromise Magazine
- Resistance: Journal of the Earth Liberation Movement
