= Jerry Vlasak =

American animal rights activist

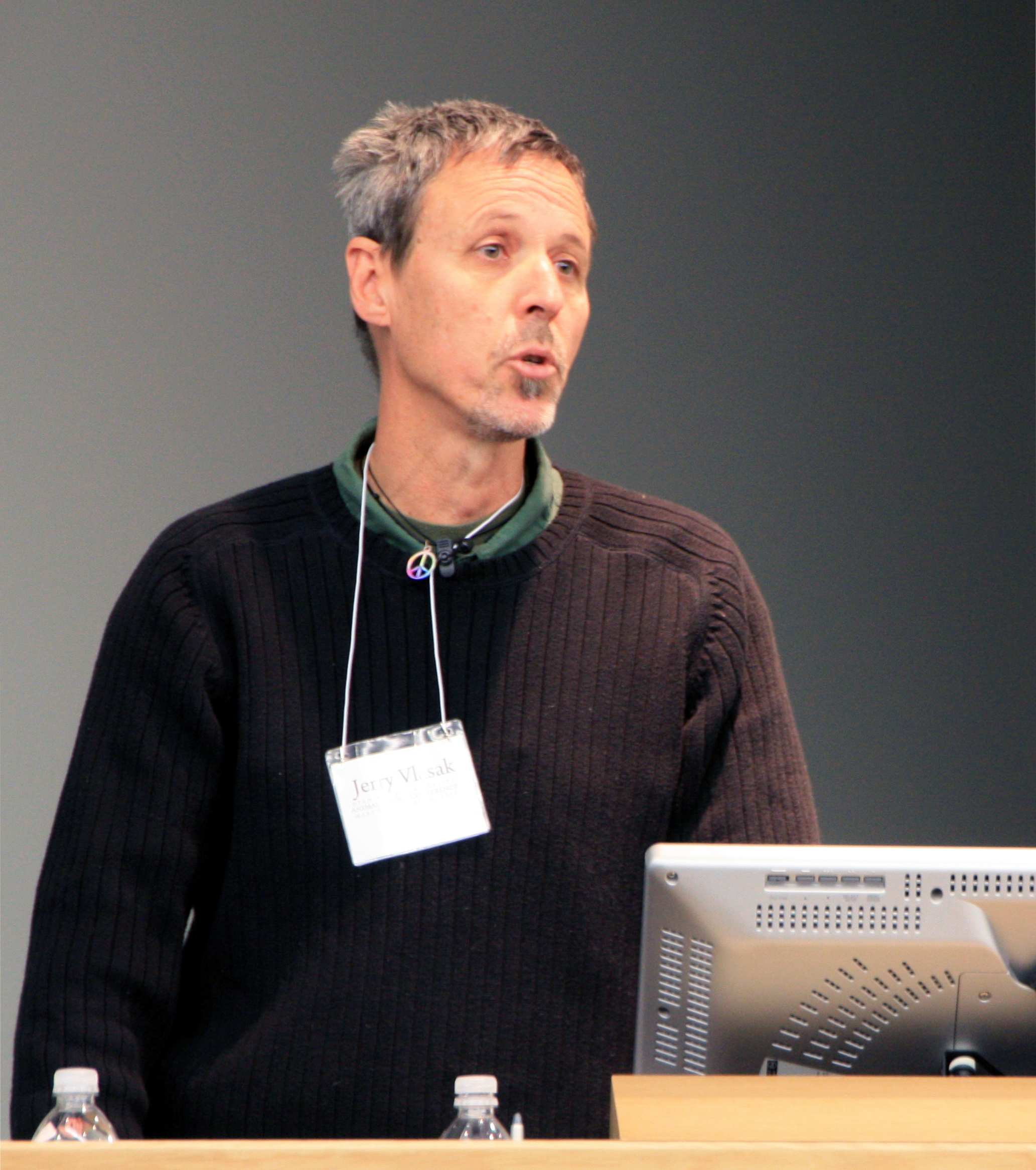
- Born: 1958 (age 67–68)
- Occupation: Animal rights activist
- Spouse: Pamelyn Ferdin (m. 1986; div. 2008)

Jerry Vlasak (born c. 1958) is an American animal rights activist and trauma surgeon. He is a press officer for the North American Animal Liberation Press Office, a former director of the Animal Defense League of Los Angeles, and a former advisor to SPEAK, the Voice for the Animals.

Vlasak came to public attention in 2003, 2004, and again in 2008, when he made statements favorable to the use of violence against animal researchers. He and his ex-wife, former actress Pamelyn Ferdin, were banned from entering the United Kingdom in 2004, on the grounds that their presence, according to the Home Secretary, "would not be conducive to the public good."

== Education and career ==
Raised in Austin, Texas, Vlasak graduated with an MD from the University of Texas Medical School at Houston in 1984. He is board certified in General Surgery and is licensed as a medical doctor in California and Texas. He was an animal researcher himself, but has since become adamantly opposed to vivisection. According to the Los Angeles Times, he conducted research on dogs' arteries in a laboratory at the Harbor-UCLA Medical Center, during or after which the dogs were killed.

== Political activism ==
Inspired by his ex-wife, former actress Pamelyn Ferdin, who was a president of Stop Huntingdon Animal Cruelty in the U.S., Vlasak became vegan and began being active in promoting animal rights in 1993. He became a spokesperson for the Physicians Committee for Responsible Medicine, although he is no longer a member, and was a board member of the Sea Shepherd Conservation Society.

His principal role in the animal liberation movement is as a liaison between the movement and the public, publicizing the movement's "underground" activities in his role as a press officer. He acknowledges his medical background provides a "certain amount of credibility" to the movement and has used it to advocate against the use of animals in scientific experimentation.

In 2005, Dr. Vlasak spoke at length to the Committee on Environment and Public Works's investigation into Eco-terrorism. In his summation, Dr. Vlasak said:

Here in the U.S., there are thousands of physicians like myself who realize there is no need to kill animals in order to help humans, the vast majority of whom get sick and die because of preventable lifestyle variables such as diet, smoking, drugs and environmental toxins.

In a country where 45 million people do without reliable access to ANY medical care, there is no reason to waste hundreds of millions of dollars testing drugs and procedures on non-human animals.

In a world where 20,000 children are dying from lack of access to clean water each week world wide, there is no reason to waste hundreds of millions of dollars testing drugs and procedures on non-human animals.

=== Sea Shepherd activism ===
Vlasak has been active in opposing the seal hunt in Canada, which occurs every year, mostly in March and April. He was punched in the face by sealers during the 2005 hunt on Prince Edward Island, which he attended on behalf of the Sea Shepherd Conversation Society. No charges were brought in connection with the attack. Vlasak was Sea Shepherd's treasurer for many years. During the same hunt, he was one of 11 activists convicted of violating Canada's Department of Fisheries and Oceans regulations, because they watched the hunt without a permit. He was sentenced to 22 days in prison, which he voluntarily re-entered Canada to serve in a Prince Edward Island jail in 2006 in protest of that year's seal hunt.

=== Conviction ===
Vlasak was convicted in Los Angeles in 2006 of "targeted protesting" for demonstrating against euthanasia at animal shelters outside the home of a Department of Animal Services employee. He was sentenced to 30 days' electronic monitoring. He appealed and then lost the decision, and subsequently served his sentence.

== Views on violence ==
Vlasak has been criticized for legitimizing the use of violence against animal researchers. He told a discussion group at an animal rights conference in 2003:

I think there is a use for violence in our movement. And I think it can be an effective strategy. Not only is it morally acceptable, I think that there are places where it could be used quite effectively from a pragmatic standpoint.

For instance, if vivisectors were routinely being killed, I think it would give other vivisectors pause in what they were doing in their work—and if these vivisectors were being targeted for assassination ... —and I wouldn't pick some guy way down the totem pole, but if there were prominent vivisectors being assassinated, I think that there would be a trickle-down effect and many, many people who are lower on that totem pole would say, "I'm not going to get into this business because it's a very dangerous business ...

And I don't think you'd have to kill—assassinate—too many vivisectors before you would see a marked decrease in the amount of vivisection going on. And I think for 5 lives, 10 lives, 15 human lives, we could save a million, 2 million, 10 million non-human animals.

And I—you know—people get all excited about, "Oh what's going to happen when the ALF accidentally kills somebody in an arson?" Well, you know I mean, I think we need to get used to this idea. It's going to happen, okay? It's going to happen.

Following the August 2, 2008, firebombing of a house belonging to University of California Santa Cruz animal researchers, Vlasak was quoted as saying "This guy knows what he is doing. He knows that every day that he goes into the laboratory and hurts animals that it is unreasonable not to expect consequences."

In response to a restraining order obtained by UCLA in 2006, Vlasak was quoted as saying "It's laughable that someone willing to face a 30-year sentence for arson will be put off by a restraining order. It's not going to have any effect." Newsweek reported "The ALF Press Office's Vlasak says that the plan will be ineffective, in part because it circumscribes the actions of only five above-ground protesters. 'There [are] 150 more who remain' that can say and do what they want, Vlasak says."

=== Interview with The Observer ===
The controversy continued in July 2004 when Jamie Doward of The Observer wrote that Vlasak had told him during an interview: "I think violence is part of the struggle against oppression. If something bad happens to these people [animal researchers], it will discourage others. It is inevitable that violence will be used in the struggle and that it will be effective."

Vlasak responded in a press release that the allegations were part of a smear campaign against him. He wrote: "I was outraged by Jamie Doward's article in the Observer stating that I, a medical doctor who spends my entire life SAVING lives, is calling for or encouraging the assassination or killing of any being, human or non human." He continued:

People have been killed over absolutely ridiculous things like oil, power and money. It would be "speciesist" of me to say that in a battle for the moral and ethical high ground ... that there will never be casualties. I'm not encouraging or calling for this, I am simply stating that the animal rights movement is and has been the most peaceful and restrained movement the world has ever known considering the amount of terror, abuse and murder done to innocent animals for greed and profit. If by chance violence is used by those who fight for non human sentient beings, or even if there are casualties, it must be looked at in perspective and in a historical context.

He told the BBC's Today program: "I am personally not advocating, condoning or recommending that anybody be killed. I am a physician who saves lives. I spend my entire day saving people's lives. All I am saying, in a historical context, violence has been used against us as animal rights campaigners and against the animals and is no different from us using violence on the other side."

On Australian television a few months later he said: "Would I advocate taking five guilty vivisectors' lives to save hundreds of millions of innocent animal lives? Yes, I would."

=== Banned from entering the UK ===
As a result of the Observer article, the British government announced in August 2004 that Vlasak and his wife were banned from the UK. Vlasak had been due to attend a conference organized by Stop Huntingdon Animal Cruelty (SHAC), an animal-rights campaign to close Huntingdon Life Sciences. The Home Secretary told the couple that their presence in the UK "would not be conducive to the public good."

Vlasak is one of two animal liberation press officers who have been banned from entering the UK. Steven Best, professor of philosophy at the University of Texas, El Paso, and a former press officer, was banned in 2005 to prevent him from addressing an animal rights conference there.

== See also ==
- List of animal rights advocates
