= Robin Webb =

English animal rights activist

- Born: c. 1945 (age 80–81)
- Occupation: Press officer for the Animal Liberation Press Office
- Years active: Since the 1980s; press officer since October 1991
- Known for: Animal rights advocacy

Robin Webb (born c. 1945) is an English animal rights activist. He is a former member of the ruling council of the Royal Society for the Prevention of Cruelty to Animals (RSPCA), and former director of Animal Aid. A British court ruled in 2006 that Webb was a "central and pivotal figure" in the Animal Liberation Front (ALF).

Since October 1991, Webb has run the British Animal Liberation Press Office, which releases material to the media on behalf of activists operating as the ALF, the Animal Rights Militia (ARM), and the Justice Department. He has said that his policy as press officer is "never to criticize any action, whatever it may be, so long as it has been undertaken with the sincere intention of furthering animal liberation." This has led to criticism that Webb has appeared to condone acts of violence.

== Background ==
Webb has been involved in animal rights advocacy since the 1980s. He told No Compromise that his interest began when he started a new job at an electronics company located next to a slaughterhouse. Seeing the animals being delivered, and experiencing the smells and sounds, he found himself unable to eat meat. He said, "I made the connection; the blinds were torn from my eyes ... I couldn't eat a part of what I at last perceived to be an individual with their own feelings and needs." He and his partner, Margaret, became vegetarians at first, then three months later, vegans.

=== Involvement with Animal Liberation Press Office ===
Ronnie Lee, the founder of the ALF, had acted as the movement's press officer. The press office at that time was part of the Animal Liberation Front Supporters Group (ALFSG), an above-ground organisation with an open membership. In 1991, the ALFSG decided to stop speaking on behalf of the ALF because of constant police attention, and a decision was made to create the role of ALF press officer as a separate office. Webb says he was chosen because he had a respectable image.

The office's name was changed again to the Animal Liberation Press Office after the introduction of the Terrorism Act 2000, to protect the office from police attention and to reflect that it issues statements on behalf of ARM and the Justice Department, as well as the ALF.

== Controversy ==
=== Channel 4 Dispatches ===
Webb attracted controversy in 1998 during the 68-day hunger strike of British ALF activist Barry Horne, who stopped eating in protest at the British government's failure to hold a public inquiry into animal testing in the UK, something the Labour Party had indicated it would do before coming to power in 1997.

Toward the end of the hunger strike, when it appeared that Horne might die, the Animal Rights Militia (ARM), an extremist animal-rights group, issued a statement through Webb, threatening to assassinate six unnamed and four named individuals should Horne die. Shortly after this, footage shot by an independent producer, Graham Hall, was shown on the Channel 4 Dispatches programme. The production team had secretly filmed Webb holding meetings with Hall, who told Webb he wanted to arrange a bombing. In the footage, Webb appeared to offer advice on how to make a bomb. The footage had been shot before the Animal Rights Militia had issued its threat against the scientists, and there was no suggestion that Webb was himself engaged in violent action. Webb complained that the Dispatches programme had been selectively edited and his own quotes shown out of context. Channel 4 disagreed.

=== Attitude toward violence ===
Webb himself has appeared to link the ALF and the Animal Rights Militia, together with a third animal-rights group known for violence, the Justice Department. In an interview with No Compromise, the animal-liberation magazine, he said that any vegetarian or vegan who carries out an action that falls within the ALF's three stated aims may claim that action on behalf of the ALF. He added: "And if someone wishes to act as the Animal Rights Militia or the Justice Department? Simply put, the third policy of the ALF [to take every reasonable precaution not to harm or endanger life, either human or non-human] no longer applies."

Webb has said that children of animal researchers are legitimate targets of protest. He told the Sunday Herald in 2004: "Some say it is morally unacceptable but it is equally unacceptable to use animals in experiments. The children of those scientists are enjoying a lifestyle built on the blood and abuse of innocent animals. Why should they be allowed to close the door on that and sit down and watch TV and enjoy themselves when animals are suffering and dying because of the actions of the family breadwinner? They are a justifiable target for protest."

Webb has said that animal liberation protests will escalate. "There are about 2000 people prepared at any one time to take action for us—more legislation will simply push moderate people to the extremes of the organisation ... When you look at other struggles, there comes a point where non-violent action no longer works. If activists become fed up with non-violent protest then they will take another road and adopt an armed struggle. When you have right on your side, it's easy to keep going. It really is."

=== Oxford University ===
In response to a request for an injunction by Oxford University, a British court ruled in October 2006 that Webb was a "central and pivotal figure" in the ALF, and that the Animal Liberation Press Office was "not a neutral reporting exercise or even simply a vehicle for apologists for the ALF, but a vital part of the ALF's strategy." The court ruled that Webb is bound by an injunction banning protests at the building site of Oxford's new biomedical research centre. Webb had argued that, as a journalist, the injunction would impinge upon his freedom of speech; the court ruled that Webb is not a journalist, but a propagandist.

== See also ==
- GANDALF trial
- Eco-terrorism
- List of animal rights advocates
