= Steven Best =

American philosopher, writer and activist (born 1955)

- Born: December 1955 (age 70)
- Education: University of Illinois at Urbana-Champaign; University of Chicago; University of Texas at Austin
- Occupations: Associate Professor of Humanities and Philosophy at the University of Texas at El Paso
- Known for: Co-founder of the North American Animal Liberation Press Office
- Notable work: (ed.) Terrorists or Freedom Fighters? Reflections on the Liberation of Animals (2004)
- Website: drstevebest.wordpress.com

Steven Best (born December 1955) is an American philosopher, writer, speaker and activist. His concerns include animal rights, species extinction, human overpopulation, ecological crisis, biotechnology, liberation politics, terrorism, mass media and culture, globalization, and capitalist domination. He is Associate Professor of Humanities and Philosophy at the University of Texas at El Paso. He has published 13 books and over 200 articles and reviews.

== Background ==
After attending high school in Chicago, Best took casual jobs in factories and drove a truck for a few years. He attended the College of DuPage (Illinois) from 1977 to 1979, where he completed an associate degree in film and theater. He then studied philosophy at the University of Illinois at Urbana-Champaign from 1979 to 1983, where he received a bachelor's degree with distinction; at the University of Chicago from 1985 to 1987 where he obtained his master's degree; and at the University of Texas at Austin from 1989 to 1993, where he obtained his Ph.D.

In 1993, he began as an Assistant Professor of Humanities and Philosophy at the University of Texas at El Paso promoted to Associate Professor in 1999, and was Chair of the Philosophy Department 2002–2005.

== Academic work ==
A writer for The Chronicle of Higher Education described Best in 2005 as "one of the leading scholarly voices on animal rights."

Best is co-founder of the Institute for Critical Animal Studies (ICAS), formerly known as the Center on Animal Liberation Affairs (CALA). His academic interests are continental philosophy, postmodernism, and environmental philosophy. He is known for his post-structuralist notions of revolution, based equally in animal rights and total liberation. He is the editor, with Anthony J. Nocella, of Terrorists or Freedom Fighters? Reflections on the Liberation of Animals (2004), which has a foreword by Ward Churchill, and the companion volume on revolutionary environmentalism, Igniting a Revolution: Voices in Defense of the Earth (2006).

Best co-authored with Douglas Kellner a trilogy of texts on postmodern theory and cultural studies – Postmodern Theory: Critical Interrogations (1991), The Postmodern Turn (1997), and The Postmodern Adventure: Science, Technology, and Cultural Studies at the Third Millennium (2001).

With Peter McLaren and Anthony J. Nocella II, Best co-edited Academic Repression: Reflections from the Academic Industrial Complex (2010).

Best has also written on subjects relating to popular culture, including articles on the film RoboCop and Hip hop music.

== Activism ==
Best is an advocate of Inclusive Democracy, a movement founded by Greek political philosopher Takis Fotopoulos, and sits on the international advisory board of the International Journal of Inclusive Democracy. He writes:

In bold contrast to the limitations of the animal advocacy movement (AAM) and all other reformist causes, Takis Fotopoulos advances a broad view of human dynamics and social institutions, their impact on the earth, and the resulting consequences for society itself. Combining anti-capitalist, radical democracy, and ecological concerns in the concept of "ecological democracy," Fotopoulos defines this notion as "the institutional framework which aims at the elimination of any human attempt to dominate the natural world, in other words, as the system which aims to reintegrate humans and Nature. This implies transcending the present 'instrumentalist' view of Nature, in which Nature is seen as an instrument for growth, within a process of endless concentration of power.

=== Animal Liberation Press Office ===
In December 2004, Best co-founded the North American Animal Liberation Press Office, which acts as a media office for a number of animal rights groups, including the Animal Liberation Front (ALF), though he has said that he is not himself an ALF activist.

=== Views on civil disobedience, militant direct action and violence ===
Best has criticized others in the animal-rights movement who embrace a "fundamentalist pacifism" and oppose any kind of militant direct action, which could include such tactics as "illegal raids, rescues, and sabotage attacks." He has referred to them as "Franciombes" after Gary Francione who believes in pursuing animal rights only through peaceful means. Best says that the current ecocrisis "renders fundamentalist pacifism obsolete."

In his 2014 book The Politics of Total Liberation: Revolution for the 21st Century, Best asserts that militant direct action and "extensional self-defense" reduces violence, adding that the notion "violence only creates more violence" is a pacifist myth. As an example of "extensional self-defense", he cites the use of armed soldiers by some African governments to protect endangered wildlife from poachers, stating that "pacifists cannot stop poachers, but bullets can, and while many measures must be taken to protect endangered species, right now armed soldiers are the best protection rhinos and elephants have against murderous, weapon-wielding poachers." Best also warns against romanticizing violence, and asserts that a variety of tactics can be used depending on the situation. He refers to this as the contextualist position:

In a global setting, contextualism asks this question: How can we best defend all life and the entire planet from the massive and unrelenting assault of global capitalism, centralized political rule, militarism, and the metastasizing growth of the human empire colonizing the earth and monopolizing its resources? Questions concerning the legitimacy and efficacy of physical force cannot be answered in the abstract, but only in specific contexts. Whereas partisans on both sides want to read the history of moral progress as driven exclusively by nonviolence or violence, the fact is that social change unfolds through the entire arsenal of pressure tactics, which include strikes, protests, demonstrations, boycotts, sabotage, liberation, education, legislation or even armed struggle.

Best has explained a justification for civil disobedience in the essay Beyond Animal Liberation.

=== Ban from entering the United Kingdom ===
In 2005, Best planned to attend a rally to celebrate the closure—as a result of protests from the animal rights movement—of Newchurch Farm, where guinea pigs were being bred for research purposes. Charles Clarke, the British Home Secretary, said he would rely on new Home Office rules preventing people from enter the UK if they "foment, justify or glorify terrorist violence in further of particular beliefs; seek to provoke others to terrorist acts; foment other serious criminal activity or seek to provoke others to serious criminal acts." In a letter to Best dated August 24, 2005, Clarke cited a comment by Best quoted by The Daily Telegraph: "We are not terrorists, but we are a threat. We are a threat both economically and philosophically. Our power is not in the right to vote but the power to stop production. We will break the law and destroy property until we win." Best is also alleged to have said that the animal rights movement did not want to "reform" vivisectionists but to "wipe them off the face of the earth."

The letter from the Home Secretary said: "In expressing such views, it is considered that you are fomenting and justifying terrorist violence and seeking to provoke others to terrorist acts and fomenting other serious criminal activity and seeking to provoke others to serious criminal acts." The letter was dated the same day that the Home Office published its new list of behaviors that would see people banned from the UK. Under the list, people who write, speak, run a website, or use their positions as teachers to express views that "foment, justify, or glorify violence in furtherance of particular beliefs" will be banned or deported. The British government called the new measures part of its "ongoing work to tackle terrorism and extremism." Best said he was not surprised by the ban. He told the Chronicle of Higher Education: "It was only a matter of time, especially after the July 7, 2005 London bombings. The climate in Britain is totally unbelievable. It's very fascist. It's becoming a police state."

== See also ==
- Animal Liberation Press Office
- Critical animal studies (CAS)
- Earth Liberation Front (ELF)
- Behind the Mask
- Speciesism: The Movie
- List of animal rights advocates
