= DeBakey =

DeBakey may refer to:

- Lois DeBakey
- Michael E. DeBakey
- Selma DeBakey
- DeBakey forceps
- DeBakey classification system of aortic dissection
- DeBakey High School for Health Professions and the DeBakey High School for Health Professions at Qatar
- Michael E. DeBakey Veterans Affairs Medical Center in Houston
