= Eastern Mediterranean Activities Conference =

- Abbreviation: EMAC
- Formation: 1978
- Dissolved: 2011
- Legal status: Inactive
- Region served: Middle East, Greece, Egypt
- Members: 17 to 27 schools
- Official language: English

The Eastern Mediterranean Activities Conference (EMAC) was a regional sports and activities league founded in 1978 that hosted tournaments in a wide range of athletic and academic activities. The conference consisted of mostly American schools, with some British schools, from mostly 11 nations - Bahrain, Cyprus, Egypt, Greece, Jordan, Kuwait, Lebanon, Oman, Qatar, Syria, and the UAE. At its peak, 27 schools were a part of the conference. Occasionally, schools who were not EMAC members and even from other countries (like Saudi Arabia) were allowed to participate in certain tournaments as affiliates. EMAC ceased to exist as a conference in 2011.

== Tournaments ==
The schedule of tournaments for the following year was decided around April. Teams from individual schools would typically prepare months in advance before an EMAC tournament, which was usually scheduled over a weekend, so as not to disturb school sessions (however, as most EMAC events would last on average from 3 to 5 days, some days would fall on a normal school day).

Participating schools took turns hosting the various events, meaning that they were responsible for facilitating the events on their own campuses. They were also responsible for housing the traveling athletes with their own students. Occasionally, some students would stay in hotels if there were not enough student hosts available for housing. Due to the large amount of participating member schools, most schools would host only one tournament each year, either in the fall or spring semester. In some cases, a school might have hosted two events or even none, depending on the schedule from year to year. The events hosted by each member school would usually differ from year to year.

The activities would be held in the mornings and afternoons of the tournament, while evenings were usually kept free for the team members to socialize and to experience the host city. The teams were often taken to malls and shopping centers, as well as to visit local or historical landmarks. On many occasions, they were also invited to a school-chaperoned mixer or BBQ organized by the host school.

== Activities ==
=== Athletic ===
The following athletic activities were offered:

- Badminton
- Basketball
- Cross country
- Soccer
- Softball
- Swimming
- Tennis
- Track & field
- Volleyball
- Wrestling

Varsity teams were for students aged 16 and older, while Junior Varsity teams for participants under the age of 16. Both Track & Field and Swimming, however, also included Under 13 teams as well.

Typically, each sport would have four separate tournaments, with a distinction made between boys and girls teams, as well as between Varsity and Junior Varsity teams. This would result in Varsity Boys, Varsity Girls, JV Boys, and JV Girls teams and tournaments. However, both gender tournaments were usually, but not always, hosted together at each level (e.g. the Varsity Girls Basketball and Varsity Boys Basketball tournaments would happen simultaneously and be hosted by one school).

The exceptions to this were both the Track & Field and Swimming events. Both sports would have roughly 6 tournaments each (Varsity Boys, Varsity Girls, JV Boys, JV Girls, under 13 Boys, and Under 13 Girls) happening simultaneously and be hosted by one school.

In its later years, EMAC also offered an activity called the Middle School Festival, a noncompetitive tournament in which participants played a variety of sports and gained exposure to athletics and team play.

=== Non-athletic ===
EMAC also offered three non-athletic activities:

- Academic Games
- Debate & Forensics
- Fine Arts Festival

The teams for all 3 events were gender-neutral, as unlike the athletic events, there was no distinction between a boys and girls team. However, both the Academic Games and the Fine Arts Festival still had Varsity and Junior Varsity teams. The Debate & Forensics did not, as membership to the D&F teams was open to students of all ages and genders; this made the Debate & Forensics tournament the only tournament without separate Varsity and Junior Varsity tournaments, and separate boys and girls tournaments.

== Code of Conduct ==
All EMAC participants were required to sign an official form stating that they agreed to adhere to the Code of Conduct, which prohibited the participant from possession/use of alcohol and illegal narcotics, as well as enforcing a strict curfew. Any participant found to have violated these rules may be punished with a 12-month ban from all EMAC activities and would also likely face punishment from their own school administration.

== Member schools ==
The EMAC member schools (full-time and affiliate) included, but were not limited to, the following schools:

- Campion School, Athens, Greece - Left EMAC in 2007
- American Community School of Abu Dhabi - Left EMAC to form MESAC in 2010
- American School of Dubai - Left EMAC to form MESAC in 2010
- American School of Doha - Left EMAC to form MESAC in 2010
- Cairo American College - Left EMAC to form MESAC in 2010
- Dubai American Academy - Left EMAC to form MESAC in 2010
- American School of Kuwait - Left EMAC to join ISAC in 2011, now a part of NESAC
- American International School of Kuwait - Left EMAC to join ISAC in 2011, now a part of NESAC
- American British Academy - Left EMAC in 2011 when conference folded, now a part of MESAC
- American Community School in Amman - Left EMAC in 2011 when conference folded, now a part of SAISA
- American Community School at Beirut - Left EMAC to join ISAC in 2011, now a part of NESAC
- Schutz American School, Alexandria - Left EMAC in 2011 when conference folded
- British International School in Cairo - Left EMAC in 2011 when conference folded
- Damascus Community School
- American Community School of Athens
