= Middle East South Asia Conference =

- Abbreviation: MESAC
- Formation: 2010
- Legal status: Active
- Region served: Middle East, Asia
- Members: 6
- Official language: English

The Middle East South Asia Conference (MESAC) is an athletic and academic conference consisting of six international schools in the Middle East and India. The conference was formed in 2010 for the purpose of creating a smaller, more intimate medium for athletic and academic competitions compared to the conference's predecessor, EMAC. Events are hosted at one of the conference's six schools in India, Oman, Qatar, and the UAE. From 2017 to 2019, students from the American School of Doha couldn't travel to the UAE, and as a result could not attend any of the events hosted in the UAE schools.

== Member Schools ==
Current members:

- American School of Dubai - Dubai, UAE
- American Community School of Abu Dhabi - Abu Dhabi, UAE
- American Embassy School - New Delhi, India
- American School of Doha - Doha, Qatar
- Dubai American Academy - Dubai, UAE
- American British Academy - Muscat, Oman

Former members:

- Cairo American College - Cairo, Egypt

== Events ==
MESAC events are often subdivided into Junior Varsity (grades 8-10) and Varsity (grades 11-12), with each competing at its own MESAC athletic event. Most of the sporting events are also divided into Boys and Girls events. In addition, most events include both a Boys and Girls tournament at the same level. There are Fine Arts events where all the schools associated with MESAC come together to perform and display several works of art. These events include: choir songs, band instrumentals and a drama piece. A few visual art pieces are displayed too.

In rare occasions (if the athlete is good enough) 9th and 10th graders are allowed to play varsity. All athletes over the age of 16, however, are required to play at the varsity level. Events represented in MESAC competitions (by season) are:

=== Fall (Season 1) ===
- Academic Games
- Golf
- Swimming
- Volleyball

=== Winter (Season 2) ===
- Basketball
- Cross-Country
- Soccer/Football
- Tennis
- Wrestling
- Senior Fine Arts

=== Spring (Season 3) ===
- Badminton
- Baseball & Softball
- Track and Field
- Speech and Debate
- Junior Fine Arts
