= Frankie Trull =

American science advocate and lobbyist

Frankie Trull is an American science advocate and lobbyist. She is founder and president of the Foundation for Biomedical Research, a non-profit organization that educates the public about animal research in the quest for medical advancements, treatments and cures for both humans and animals. Trull is also president of the National Association for Biomedical Research (NABR), which aims to provide a unified voice for the scientific community on legislative and regulatory matters affecting humane laboratory animal research.

Trull received her undergraduate degree from Boston University and her master's degree from Tufts University. She is founder and president of Policy Directions Inc., a Washington, D.C.–based government relations/strategic government communications firm, which specializes in health, medical research and advocacy, medical education and biotechnology, pharmaceutical and agriculture issues and assists large and small companies and nonprofits in addressing legislative and regulatory initiatives and policy development. Trull also serves on the board of overseers of the Tufts University Cummings School of Veterinary Medicine.

Trull played an instrumental role in coordinating Congressional consensus for the passage of the Animal Enterprise Terrorism Act (AETA), signed into law by President George W. Bush in 2006, to provide greater protection for researchers from animal rights extremists. Also in 2006, Trull coordinated the effort for successful passage of legislation to confer the Congressional Gold Medal on heart surgeon Michael E. DeBakey. She has also written numerous articles on the importance of biomedical research and the threat posed to the American research community by extremism.

== Awards ==
In 1991, Trull was the recipient of the Distinguished Leadership Award from The Endocrine Society and the Presidential Award from the Society for Neuroscience. In 2003, she was given a Special Recognition Award from the American College of Laboratory Medicine (ACLAM). In 2005, Trull received the Public Service Award from the Association of Allergy and Immunology, the Society of Toxicology's Contribution to the Public Awareness of Animal Welfare Award, and the award for Education in Neuroscience from the Association of Neuroscience Departments and Programs (ANDP). The Association of American Medical Colleges awarded Trull their Special Recognition Award in 2007.
