= Trull (surname) =

Trull is an English language surname. It may refer to:

- Andrew Trull (1956–2004), British scientist
- Don Trull (born 1941), American football player
- Frankie Trull (born 1958), American lobbyist
- Ilmar Trull (born 1957), Estonian poet, children's writer, illustrator and caricaturist
- John Trull (1738–1797), American military leader
- Teresa Trull (born 1950), American singer

== See also ==
- Trull, a village in England
