= Valrani =

Valrani is a Sindhi surname. Notable people with the surname include:

- Mohan G. Valrani (born 1940), Indian industrialist
- Navin Valrani, Indian businessman
