= Buddenberg =

Buddenberg may refer to:

- Guurtje Buddenberg, Dutch film producer
- John Buddenberg (born 1965), American and Canadian football player
- Joseph Buddenberg, animal rights activist
- Michael Buddenberg, American football player
- Wilhelm Buddenberg, former mayor of Nordhorn and association football player

== See also ==
- Budenberg
  - Budenberg Gauge Company
  - Michael Budenberg
  - Robin Budenberg
- Michael Boddenberg
