= Sarah Hesterman =

Sarah Hesterman is an American gender equality activist and a U.S. delegate to the United Nations Youth Assembly. In 2014 she was named as one of the BBC 100 Women.

== Early life and education ==
Hesterman was born in the United States to John W. Hesterman, a lieutenant general in the Air Force, and Dr. Jennifer Hesterman, a professor and retired Air Force colonel. As a child in a military family, she moved frequently as a child, living in places such as Washington D.C., Qatar, and the United Kingdom.

Hesterman is a student at Long Island University Global.

== Activism ==
Hesterman's family moved to Qatar in 2013. She was driven to become an activist while living in the Middle East, and founded the Qatari branch of the United Nations Girl Up program at the American School of Doha in August 2014.

In 2015, Hesterman was involved in campaigning for the passage of the Girls Count Act, an American bill which aimed to improve registration and documentation of girls' births around the world.

In 2022, Hesterman became a program associate with #ShePersisted, an organization co-founded by gender equality expert Lucina Di Meco and democracy activist and elections specialist Kristina Wilfore. Hesterman has also written on how women's rights are threatened online by gendered disinformation in Hungary and Tunisia. These reports are a part of #ShePersisted's Monetizing Misogyny research series which examines the usage of gendered disinformation as a weapon to undermine the involvement of women in politics and to weaken democratic institutions and human rights.

== Recognition ==
In 2015, Hesterman received the Air Force Military Child of the Year award from Operation Homefront.

In 2016, Hesterman was named one of the United Nations' Empower Women's Champions for Change.
