= Schutz American School, Alexandria =

Schutz American School

Location
- 51 Schutz Street, Raml; Alexandria, 21111; Egypt

Information
- School type: American
- Motto: Schutz is family
- Founded: 1924
- CEEB code: 648100
- Head of school: Dr.Heather Naro
- Grades: Pre K2–Grade 12
- Average class size: 18
- Language: English
- Hours in school day: 8
- Colours: Blue and white
- Slogan: Falcons
- Sports: Basketball, volleyball, soccer
- Mascot: Falcon
- Accreditations: Accredited by MSA, U>S State Department School, PYP & MYP authorization by IBO, College Board AP authorized program, Member of NESA, Member of CEESA, member of IBSEA, member of SENIA
- Website: Schutz American School

The Schutz American School is an independent, coeducational day school which offers an educational program from pre-kindergarten (Early Childhood Program) through grade 12 for students of all nationalities. The school is located in Alexandria, Egypt. It is the oldest American school in Africa, founded in 1924. The school year comprises two semesters extending from late August through mid-June.

== Organization ==
The school is governed by a 13-member self-perpetuating School Board, serving renewable 3-year terms.

== Curriculum ==
The curriculum is that of U.S. general academic and college-preparatory public schools. The school's testing program includes PSAT, SAT, Advanced Placement and other College Board tests and MAP tests. Instruction is in English. French is taught as a foreign language beginning in grade 6, and Arabic is taught as both a native and foreign language beginning in kindergarten. Once students are in grade 9, they have a choice to continue Arabic or French. The school is accredited by MSA, the U.S State Department, PYP & MYP authorization by IBO, College Board AP authorized program, a member of NESA, a member of CEESA, a member of IBSEA, and a member of SENIA.

== Faculty ==
In the 2024–2025 school year, there are 84 academic faculty members. The administrative team comprises a Head of School, Assistant Head of School, Elementary & Middle School Principal (Prek3– Grade 9), High School Principal (Grade 10 - 12) Assistant Principals, and Curriculum Coordinator.

== Enrollment ==
In the 2025 school year, the enrollment was 247 students. The student body represents about 20 or more different countries, with 29.1% of students being Egyptian citizens, 42.5% being US citizens, and 28.3% holding other nationalities. The most represented nationalities by students in Schutz are: USA, Egypt, Canada, Sudan, and UK. The average class size is 18 students.

== Facilities ==
The school is on two adjoining campuses, the Pattee and Schutz campuses. Walters Hall and the Villa are found on Pattee Campus, while Roy, Meloy, and Lorimer Halls are on the Schutz campuses. Athletic facilities include basketball, soccer, and volleyball courts, 2 playground areas, a swimming pool, and a gymnasium/weight room. Other facilities include an auditorium with theater capabilities that seats 200 with acoustic sound panels and choral risers, 2 libraries, 2 computer laboratories, 2 art centers, a music room, a drama room, a cafeteria, and a canteen.

=== Pattee Campus ===
Walters Hall houses the Elementary School (pre-kindergarten through fifth-grade classes) and the Elementary School office. It has 13 classrooms, a library, and also has facilities for art, technology, music, and English as a Second Language (ESL).

The Villa was part of the land purchase that included the soccer field and land on which Walters Hall is located. It houses Administration offices and a board/meeting room.

=== Schutz Campus ===
Roy Hall, the original Schutz building, houses the dining room/kitchen complex, staff housing facilities, and the central maintenance office.

Meloy Hall contains classrooms for Grade 6-12 students, the High School library, science labs, a computer lab, the Counselor/Psychologist office, and the High School office.

Lorimer Hall contains a large Performing Arts Center and additional Middle School classrooms. The Performing Arts Center can accommodate all of the 7–12 students and is used for plays, music programs, assemblies, school dances, PTA programs, board of trustees meetings, and staff meetings. On weekends serves as an interdenominational Christian place of worship on Sundays. The auditorium is equipped with a sound system and is air-conditioned.

=== Sports facilities ===
The school has six main sports facilities:

- A swimming pool for P.E. and student and staff use outside the school day
- An Outdoor basketball court which can also be used for volleyball
- A soccer field
- A playground
- A covered court often used for Basketball, Volleyball, Soccer, and many other sports.
- An indoor and outdoor gym with treadmills and many other machines

All of the sports facilities are located on campus and are available for students' use until 5:00 p.m. on school days.

=== Cafeteria ===
6th through 12th grade students can either eat in the cafeteria located in Roy Hall or at the canteen. The cafeteria and canteen have a variety of different food choices from which students can choose from. PK2 through 2nd grade students eat in the lower level of Walters Hall. Grades 3 through 5 eat outdoors near Walters Hall.

== Activities ==
Sports and club offerings vary from year to year depending on student interest and participation.

The school competes in the Middle East Triangle Sports Conference (METS). Currently in the METS as a trial member, Schutz joins international schools from Lebanon, Jordan, Egypt, Turkey, the West Bank, and Bahrain. Schutz was once a member of the Eastern Mediterranean Activities Conference (EMAC), but left in 2011 when that conference folded.

Sports offered include Volleyball, Basketball, Football, Swimming, Badminton, Tennis, and Track and Field with other sports offered on student demand. There are teams for both boys and girls, from grades 4-5 through middle school, as well as junior varsity and varsity levels.

Schutz also offers non-athletic activities and organizations as well for its students, including the Student Council, Model United Nations, National Honor Society, National Junior Honor Society, World's Scholar's Cup, Community Service & Interact Club, school drama productions, and an annual talent show.
