= American Community School in Amman =

American Community School Amman
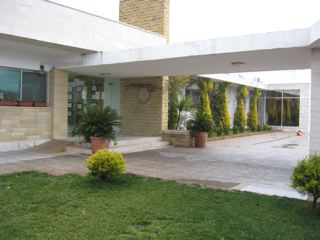

Location
- Amman; Jordan; 31.959650°N 35.849363°E

Information
- Type: Private
- Established: 1955
- Enrollment: 750
- Colors: Black and Gold
- Mascot: Scorpion
- Website: www.acsamman.edu.jo

The American Community School is a private, preparatory, international school in Amman, the capital of Jordan. It is an independent, coeducational day school which offers an American educational program from preschool (3 years old) through grade 12 for students of all nationalities. The School was founded in 1955.

== Curriculum ==
The curriculum is that of U.S. schools. Instruction is in English. Arabic, Spanish, and French are all taught as foreign languages. There is no religious instruction. Advanced Placement courses are offered in 15 different courses. The School is accredited by the Middle States Association of Colleges and Schools.

For reading, writing and mathematics, ACS standards are based on the Common Core, the U.S. standards followed by 46 States, and the AERO standards developed through the US Department of State Office of Overseas Schools. All other subject areas have standards based on US professional organizations or states.

== Facilities ==
The School is housed on approximately 9 acres (3.6 ha) of land in West Amman. Facilities include 60 classrooms, 5 modern science laboratories, over 250 solar systems, a Collaborative Learning Commons which includes a maker space, one video and audio production studio, a sports and fine arts center, 2 playing fields, 2 tennis courts, and facilities for art, drama, and music education.

== Faculty ==
The faculty is composed of 79 members, including 48 U.S. citizens, 15 host-country nationals, and 16 third-country nationals. Over 75% of the teachers hold a master's degree in education.

== Enrollment ==
Total enrollment for the 2014–2015 school year was approximately 750 students from 47 nations. Of the student population, 20% are American, 30% are Jordanian, 3% are Canadian, and 47% are from additional countries. The high school enrollment was 200 students, with 47 in the class of 2014.

== Sports & Activities ==
ACS belongs to both the Near East Schools Activities Conference (NESAC) and the International Schools Activities Conference (ISAC) for athletics competitions, academic games, and fine arts activities. It is also involved with various local Jordanian conferences and organizations. In order for students to participate in extracurricular activities, they must maintain their academic eligibility. It used to be a member of the Eastern Mediterranean Activities Conference (EMAC), until that conference shut down in 2011.

Academic Games, Badminton, Band & Choir, Basketball, Forensics, Soccer, Swimming, Tennis, Track & Field, and Volleyball are offered to students at the Varsity and Junior Varsity levels. Junior Varsity (JV) is defined as students under the age of 16 as of September 1, and Varsity is defined as students under the age of 19 as of September 1 of that current year. At ACS, only students in 10th grade or higher are allowed to participate in Varsity sports. Only students in 8th grade or higher are allowed to participate in JV sports.

Other groups and activities offered to students include Adventure Club, Arabic Club, Drama, National Honor Society, Model United Nations, and Student Council.

== Finances ==
In the 2004–2005 school year, about 87% of the School's income derived from regular day school tuition and registration fees. Annual tuition rates are as follows: 3-yr. and PK: $2,714; Kdg.: $5,935; grades 1-5: $8,130; grades 6-8: $9,335; and grades 9-12: $10,820. The School also charges a one-time capital fund assessment of $3,000. (All fees are quoted in U.S. dollars.)

As per, In School Year 2017–2018, 2018–2019 Early Years (4 years old) – $8,050, $11,340 Grades 1 through 5 $14,150 $14,860 Grades 6 through 8 $17,820 $18,710 Grades 9 through 12 $22,280 $23,390 Bus (round trip) $1,800 $1,800 Capital Fund Assessment One time payment per student $7,000 $7,000 Non-Refundable Registration Fee Registration fees will be deducted from the tuition $3,000 per child $4,600 per family $3,300 per child $5,100 per family Non-refundable Application Fee Payable online upon completing the application $100 $100

== See also ==
- List of international schools
- List of schools in Jordan
