= Americans in Qatar =

Total population
- 15,000 (2014)

Regions with significant populations
- Doha

Languages
- English (American English) · Arabic and Spanish

Related ethnic groups
- Americans

Americans in Qatar are a large immigrant community who numbered around 3,800 in the year 1999. In recent years, this figure has more than doubled and various estimates now put the number of Americans in Qatar to be up to 15,000. Most Americans within the country tend to be based in the capital city of Doha and are largely attracted by the tax-free inducement of the Persian Gulf state. American expatriates run a number of community organisations, meetups and get-togethers. There are also many American schools throughout Qatar, often consisting of U.S. teachers and students.

== Education ==
American schools in Qatar include:

- American School of Doha
- DeBakey High School for Health Professions at Qatar

== See also ==
- Qatar–United States relations
- American diaspora
- Ethnic groups in Qatar
- Qatari Americans
