= National Society for Medical Research =

Organization

The National Society for Medical Research (NSMR) was formed in 1945 by three physicians, Andrew C. Ivy, Ralph G. Carlson and George E. Wakerlin of The University of Illinois Medical School. The organization was formed in response to increasing resistance of the use of animals in medical experimentation, including for vivisection. They were " founded to improve public understanding of the principals methods and needs of the biological services". NSMR merged in 1985 with the Association for Biomedical Research to become the National Association for Biomedical Research.

A collection of the Society's papers is held at the National Library of Medicine in Bethesda, Maryland.
