= American Community School of Abu Dhabi =

Location
- Saadiyat Island; Abu Dhabi; United Arab Emirates; 24.517°N 54.440°E

Information
- Founded: 1972
- Status: Open
- Superintendent: Monique Flickinger
- High School Principal: Kathy Mackay
- Middle School Principal: Karl Poulin
- Elementary School Principal: Jonathon Mueller
- Grades: KG1-12
- Enrollment: 1400
- Language: English
- Hours in school day: 7
- Campus size: 6 hectare
- Colours: Green and white
- Athletics conference: Middle East South Asia Conference (MESAC)
- Mascot: Sandy the Sand Viper
- Nickname: ACS
- Team name: Sand Vipers
- Rival: American School of Dubai
- Accreditation: Middle States Association of Colleges and Schools; International Baccalaureate Organization
- Website: acs.sch.ae

The American Community School of Abu Dhabi (ACS) is a non-profit, co-educational school operating in the United Arab Emirates. It was founded in 1972, and follows an American, standards-based curriculum with English instruction. ACS offers the International Baccalaureate Diploma, as well as a rigorous college preparatory American based diploma. ACS is affiliated with the Office of Overseas Schools, United States Department of State.

ACS is licensed by the UAE's Ministry of Education and is accredited by Middle States Association (MSA). The school is run by a Superintendent and governed by an 11-person Board of Trustees.

ACS is certified by the International Baccalaureate Organization. It is an associate member of both the North East South Asian Council of Overseas Schools (NESA) and the European Council of International Schools (ECIS). ACS is also a member of the Middle East South Asia Conference (MESAC) and the Global Online Academy (GOA) consortium.

== Campus and facilities ==
The first campus was founded in 1972, near the Japan Oil Company off Sheikh Zayed the First Road, by the US diplomatic mission and representatives of major oil companies. In 1975 the campus moved to a new location on the corner of Al Bateen Street (formerly Sultan bin Zayed Street) and Mileih Street – a site donated by President Sheikh Khalifa and further extended by him in 1989. This allowed ACS to add a high school in 1991 and offer more extracurricular activities.

On January 15, 2024, ACS started its first day at the newly built, and current, campus on Saadiyat Island close to the campus of the New York University Abu Dhabi. The Saadiyat campus came with many new and improved school facilities as compared to the Al Bateen counterpart including a FIFA sized football field. ACS sets the record for the most basketball hoops in any school in Abu Dhabi.

== Programs ==
ACS is split into three divisions: Elementary School (ranging from Pre-Kindergarten to Grade 5), Middle School (Grades 6 to 8), and High School (Grades 9 to 12). A principal and assistant principal guide each division.

Middle School offers core subjects and two to four (depending on grade level) electives that the students choose.

In High School, starting in 2007, ACS started to offer the IB Diploma program, consisting of a wide variety of International Baccalaureate (IB) classes. Since 2018, ACS offers a selection of AP (Advanced Placement) classes. Students are also given a wide range of elective courses to choose from.

To graduate from ACS, students must have at least 25 credits at the end of four years. Along with the general requirement of 25 credits, students are required to obtain a certain number of credits in particular areas of study as well as at least three community service credits each year, as well as having to perform all four types of service (direct, indirect, advocacy, and research) throughout high school.

Service learning is part of ACS's Mission and community service at ACS is extensive, and includes a wide range of student-driven and organized efforts, as well as a number of established organizations such as Habitat for humanity, Doctors Without Borders (MSF), Roots & Shoots, and Palestine Children's Relief Fund (PCRF). 5,000+ hours of service are contributed annually by ACS students in grades 1–12.

In 2021, ACS received the Future-Thinking Innovators Award at the International School Awards for the Middle School technology program.

== Faculty ==
As of 2019, there are approximately 135 educators at ACS. These teachers represent 20 nationalities, approximately 50% American, 30% Canadian and 20% from other countries. 65% hold Advanced Degrees (Master's and / or Doctorate) and spend an average of 6 years at ACS. ACS has an average student to faculty ratio of 9:1.

== Students ==
The student body consists of approximately 1,400 students from 56 nationalities. About 58% of the students are from the United States, 8% from Canada, and 4% from the UAE itself.

== Notable alumni ==
- H.E. Khaldoon Al Mubarak, the chief executive of Mubadala Development Company and Executive Affairs Authority
- Anwar Nusseibeh, son of H.E. Zaki Nusseibeh, Foreign Minister of State
- Luka Peroš, Croatian actor best known for the role of Marseille in Money Heist

== Famous visitors ==
In 1975, Santa Claus arrived at ACS by helicopter; coming down to the school campus. Soon after the event, a popular celebration was created known as "Breakfast With Santa" starting at the beginning of each December, every year. Breakfast with Santa has been a tradition at ACS ever since.

- 1976 – Astronauts Vance Brand, Thomas Stafford, and Donald Slayton of the Apollo-Soyuz Test Project
- 1982 – Alex Haley, author of Roots
- 1983 – Muhammad Ali, boxer and philanthropist
- 2017 – Alfred Worden, astronaut, and Allyson Felix, Olympic athlete
- 2018 – Charles Frank Bolden Jr., astronaut
- 2019 – Peter Schumlin, former Governor of Vermont; Helen Clark, 37th Prime Minister of New Zealand; Peter Mayer, songwriter, vocalist, and lead guitarist for Jimmy Buffett's Coral Reefer Band
- 2020 – John Register, US Paralympian
- 2021 – Becky Anderson, host of CNN Connect the World with Becky Anderson

Jane Goodall, anthropologist, visited ACS often.

== Faculty achievements ==
- Nate Bowling, current HS teacher, 2016 Washington State Teacher of the Year and 2016 National Teacher of the Year Finalist
- Brad Flickinger, former MS Tech teacher: author of Reward Learning with Badges: Spark Student Achievement (2016)
- Randall P. Girdner, current HS teacher: author of Boyd McCloyd and the Time-Travelling King (2020); The Wizard of New York City series (2016)
- Amy Greene, current asst. superintendent: 2021 Principal of the Year (awarded by the National Association for Secondary School Principals NASSP and the U.S. Department of State Office of Overseas Schools)
- Matt McGrady, former HS teacher: featured on p. 90-91 of The Power of Making Thinking Visible: Practices to Engage and Empower All Learners by Ron Ritchhart and Mark Church (2020)
- Robert “Bob Rob” Medina, former MS teacher: author of Denvoid and the Cowtown Punks (2015) and Y Con Tu Espíritu : Palabras y Muertitos (2020)
- Patrick Graham, current ES teacher: author of "Alex the Knight" (2024).

== See also ==
- Americans in the United Arab Emirates
