= Mohan G. Valrani =

Indian businessman

Mohan Valrani
- Born: September 30, 1940 (age 85); Sind, British India (now India)
- Citizenship: Indian
- Education: Baroda University
- Occupations: Senior vice-chairman, Al Shirawi Group
- Years active: 1966–present
- Spouse: Neelam Valrani
- Children: 3, including Navin Valrani
- Website: mohanvalrani.com

Mohan Valrani is an Indian industrialist. He is one of two co-founders, senior vice chairman and managing director of the Al Shirawi Group. He ranks 10th on the Forbes list of Top 100 Indian Leaders in the UAE.

== Education ==
Valrani attended high school in Baroda, and has a bachelor's degree in Finance and Commerce from the Maharaja Sayajirao University of Baroda.

== Career ==
He worked for his family's food business in Mumbai during his studies and moved to Hong Kong after graduation before relocating permanently to Dubai. In 1966, he began his partnership with the Emirati and present-day chairman Abdulla Al Shirawi. He eventually formed the Al Shirawi Group in 1971, which ranks as one of the largest privately owned industrial conglomerates in Dubai, United Arab Emirates. The group has total employment of 10,000 spread over 42 companies.

He is the founder of Arcadia British School in Dubai.

== Philanthropy ==
Valrani is a member of the board of trustees of India Club and Indian High School, Dubai, both are non-profit organizations. He is also a founder governor of Indian Business and Professional Council, Dubai.

Valrani has supported Rashid Paediatric Centre in Dubai for the past 20 years.
