= Oasis Investment Company =

Company active in the Persian Gulf

Oasis Investment Company LLC
- Company type: Private company (Holding company of the Al Shirawi Group)
- Industry: Investments
- Founded: Dubai, UAE (1971)
- Founder: Abdulla M. Al Shirawi; Mohan G. Valrani
- Headquarters: Dubai, UAE
- Area served: Persian Gulf
- Key people: Abdulla M. Al Shirawi, Founding Chairman; Mohan G. Valrani, Founding Sr. Vice Chairman
- Number of employees: 10,500 (2024)
- Subsidiaries: Companies in Printing & Packaging; Oil & Gas; Logistics; Heavy Equipment; Manufacturing; Electronics; Engineering Services; Manufacturing; Education; Technology & Innovation Hub
- Website: www.alshirawi.com

Oasis Investment Company is a Dubai-based holding company of the Al Shirawi Group, one of the largest industrial conglomerates in the Persian Gulf region and is governed by the Al Shirawi and Valrani families.

The conglomerate comprises over 30 different companies, all with unique specializations, with more than 10,500 employees. It owns companies in industries including: printing, manufacturing, engineering services, trading, transport and logistics, marketing, distribution, contracting, service industries, education and technology & innovation hub.

As of 2013, it was ranked at 74 on the Forbes list of Top 100 Companies Making an Impact in the Arab World.

== History ==
The company was founded in 1971 and is based in Dubai, the United Arab Emirates and Canada.

== Management ==
Governance of the Al Shirawi group is maintained between generations within the Al Shirawi and Valrani families. Board Members are:

- Abdulla M. Al Shirawi, Founding Chairman
- Mohan G. Valrani, Founding Sr. Vice Chairman
- Mohamed Al Shirawi, Chairman
- Hisham Al Shirawi, Sr. Vice Chairman
- Khalid Al Shirawi, Sr. Vice Chairman
- Sumeet Valrani, Sr. Vice Chairman
- Navin Valrani, Vice Chairman and Group Managing Director
- Thani Al Shirawi, Vice Chairman and Deputy Group Managing Director
- Kabir Valrani, Vice Chairman
