= American School of Doha =

The American School of Doha

Location
- Doha; Qatar; 25°15′48″N 51°28′52″E

Information
- Type: Private
- Established: 1988
- Founder: Joseph Ghougassian
- Campus Director: Dr. Victor Guthrie
- Grades: Pre-K 3 to Grade 12
- Enrollment: 2250
- Colour: Red Blue White
- Nickname: ASD, ASDoha
- Rival: Doha College, American School of Dubai
- Accreditation: New England Association of Schools and Colleges
- National ranking: 1
- Website: American School of Doha

The American School of Doha (ASD) is located in Doha, Qatar. The school was founded in 1988 by United States Ambassador Joseph Ghougassian to serve the needs of the American community in Qatar. Sponsored by the US Embassy, it operated until 1997 as the American International School (AIS). The school offers an American education by following the American curriculum from Pre-k to Grade 12. Additionally, in Grades 11 and 12, the school offers the International Baccalaureate Diploma Programme (IBDP), where students can graduate with both a high school diploma and an IB diploma or IB certificates. With expert guidance from their AP and IBDP Coordinators, students and families can confidently plan their academic path.

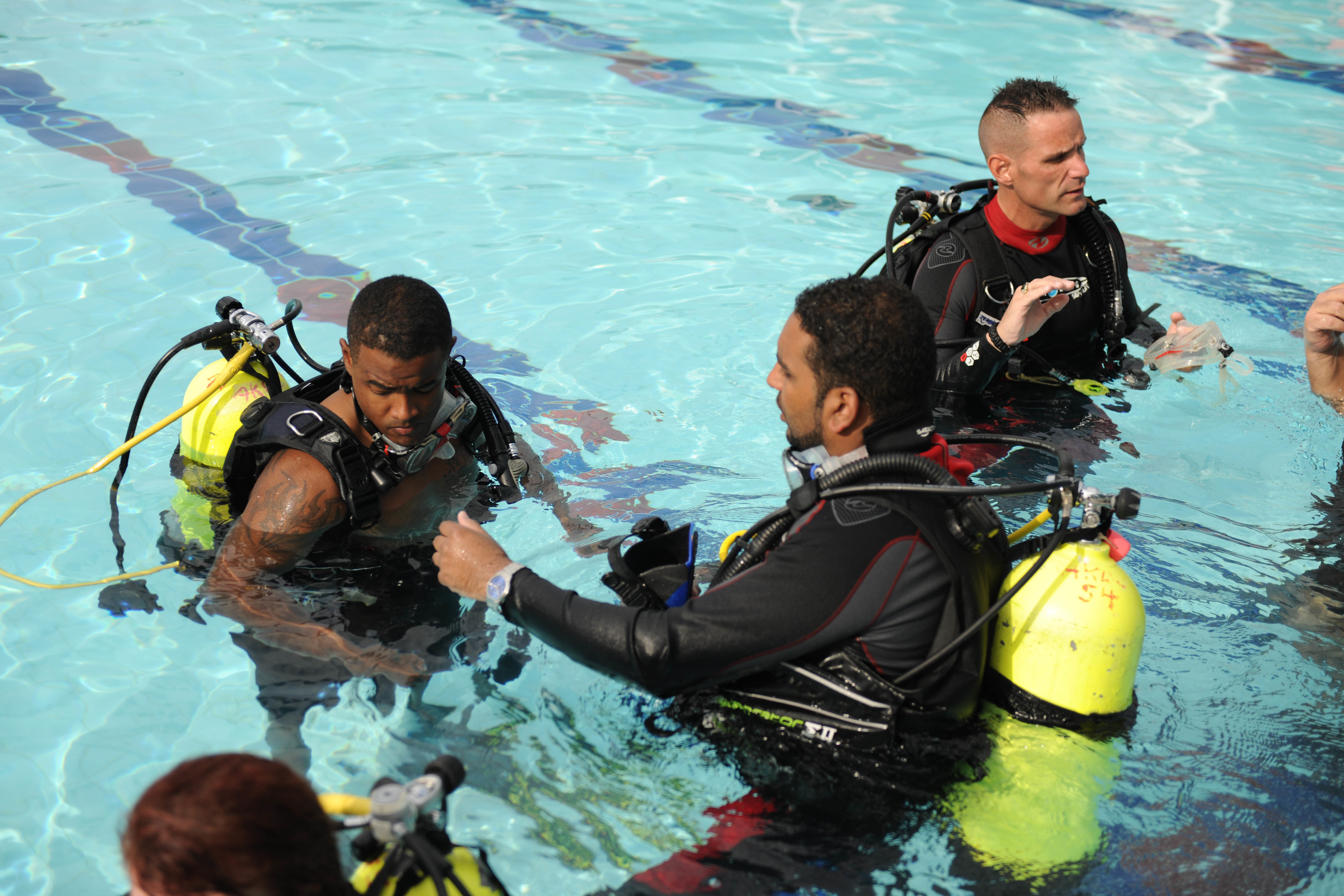
American School of Doha Military Appreciation Day 2015

There are about 2250 students, with approximately 650 in the high school and 1500 in upper elementary.

== Campus ==
In 2007, the school opened a new building adjacent to the old American School. It was designed to be “one of the top five international school facilities in world, as far as design for learning is concerned." The former building was renovated, to include an expanded library, a new and larger multi-purpose room, an expanded cafeteria, two elementary science labs and a new central office complex..Sterling serves as ASD’s cafeteria concessionaire, providing a variety of healthy and balanced meal options for students and staff.

== Athletics ==
The school was formerly a member of the Eastern Mediterranean Activities Conference (EMAC). In 2010, ASD collaborated with five other schools from the conference to create a new, smaller conference called the Middle East South Asia Conference (MESAC). ASD offers a plethora of competition at the JV and Varsity levels. All sports offered are as such: swimming, volleyball, academic games, golf, basketball, football (soccer), senior fine arts, junior fine arts, tennis, cross country, track & field, baseball/softball, and badminton. Thanks to the encouragement and support given towards athletics at the school, there is a high prevalence of student-athletes.

== See also ==
- Americans in Qatar
