= Bob Rob Medina =

American artist, author, musician, & educator

Robert "Bob Rob" Medina is an American artist, author, musician and educator.

In 1988, Medina founded the Denver-based punk/hardcore record label, Donut Crew Records, releasing the Colorado Crew series of compilation 7-inch EPs featuring The Fluid, Warlock Pinchers, and many others. He was a member of the bands Idiots Revenge, Short Fuse, Suede Fruit, Rotoflo, Savalas, Llamas Nova, Chocolate Kiss, Cabron and Gnar Jar.

Medina is a prolific visual artist, having shown in over 50 group and solo exhibitions worldwide. In 2008, he presented a solo exhibition in Tijuana, Mexico, entitled Buttoning Up the Border. In 2012 his San Diego solo exhibit, Where You From? A Collection of Sights and Sounds from Alexandria, Egypt drew coverage from National Public Radio. In 2015, he published his first book, Denvoid and the Cowtown Punks (launching his own imprint, Robot Enemy Publications, in the process), a collection of illustrations as well as personal memoirs, photos and interviews documenting the punk scene of 1980's Denver.Westword magazine named Denvoid and the Cowtown Punks the "Best Denver Music-History Book" of 2016. Also in 2015, he contributed an article on early Denver punk promoter, Tom Headbanger, to the Colorado Music History series at Denver Public Library. In 2017, Robot Enemy Publications published its second volume, Headspaces: Surrealistic Album Art & Collage by Sonny Kay.

The follow-up to Denvoid, Denvoid 2 Colorado Crew: A Collection of Tales and Images from The Colorado Punk Scene 1988-1996, is a collaboration with Sonny Kay and was released with much fanfare in 2019. The book includes over sixty interviews featuring bands, record labels, artists, writers, entrepreneurs, academics, photographers, promoters, culture jammers, and media influencers including director/musician Mark Brooks, of Lil Pimp and Metalocalypse; Pete Lyman, who has mastered Grammy Award-winning albums by artists including Chris Stapleton; Matt Jacobson owner of the influential grindcore and death metal record label, Relapse Records; punk rock artist icon, Chris Shary who has designed album covers for the Descendents and Less Than Jake, and musician/author Jason Heller, among many others. The Denvoid books were a primary source for Daniel Harvey's "Mile High Hardcore" paper in the Spring 2021 Historical Studies Journal. The article from The Springs Magazine spotlights artist Bob Rob Medina, who was featured in Episode 5 of the web series Movers & Makers. The episode explores his background, creative process, and distinct visual style. By showcasing his work, the feature emphasizes Medina's impact on the regional arts community. Overall, the profile serves as a tribute to his talent and active presence in the art scene.

In late 2020, Wake Up! Music Group released a 182-page volume of Medina's Day of The Dead artwork and writing, Y Con Tu Espíritu: Palabras y Muertitos.

In the spring of 2021 Medina conceptualized and created the Calaca Tarot Card deck. The project was realized through a Kickstarter funded project.

Medina's work on the Denver punk scene has been featured in interviews including the Emo Brown podcast, Low Key Arts' Movers and Makers, and a KGNU Metro Episode talking about both books and the impact KGNU had on Colorado's punk scene.

Medina has taught at the American Community School of Abu Dhabi in Egypt. He taught as an Art teacher for the school, he worked and lived there for 8 years. He’s since moved to San Diego California and is still teaching as an Art Teacher. Medina currently teaches at High Tech High School as a 12th grade educator.
