= International School for Medical Science and Engineering =

Location
- Al Messila, Doha, Qatar; Doha; Qatar; 25.2990833°N 51.48596919213682°E

Information
- Former name: DeBakey High School for Health Professions at Qatar
- Type: Private
- Motto: "Academic Excellence and Character Development"
- Established: 2008
- Status: Open
- Sister school: DeBakey High School for Health Professions
- Director: Dr. Abdalla Hazaimeh
- Grades: 5-12
- Language: English
- Website: https://ismeqatar.org/

International School for Medical Science and Engineering (ISME in short), formerly Michael E. DeBakey High School for Health Professions at Qatar, is a private international middle and secondary school in Doha, Qatar. It was modeled after the original school in Houston, Texas of the same name.

The school opened in September 2008 and offers education from Grade 5 through 12. The school's structure provides the 8th Grade Academy to prepare students for entering high school. The curriculum is based on United States school coursework and includes Advanced Placement courses. The school's classes are taught in the English language. The school offers vouchers to accommodate low-income students. The Houston Chronicle stated that the school attracted Qataris, Arab and American expatriates.

Following an initial closure attempt in 2018, the Ministry of Education and Higher Education terminated its contract with International School for Medical Science and Engineering in 2024. The school was consequently renamed the "International School for Medical Sciences and Engineering." The Ministry announced the school would close following the 2024-2025 academic year, but the school has remained open.

The school is located in Al Messila and is close to the Hamad Medical Center.

== School closures and incidents ==
On January 17, 2018, according to an Instagram post, International School for Medical Science and Engineering was instructed to shut down by the Ministry of Education and Higher Education; this news was confirmed by ILoveQatar.net the same day. The Ministry gave notice to school administration on December 13, 2017, and stated that the decision was made due to the outcome of "what was decided in the Committee on the Affairs of Private Schools meeting on April 27, 2017." This news was entirely unexpected to students and the staff. However, ISME would eventually remain open.

In 2023, an English teacher was terminated from his position after his X account, containing inappropriate and controversial posts, was seen by high-ranking staff.

In 2024, days before the 2024-2025 academic year, parents of students at International School for Medical Science and Engineering received an email from the school administration informing them that the upcoming academic year would be the last for the school. The decision to close the school was made by the Ministry of Education and Higher Education. The Ministry decided to end the contract with the operator of the school, leading to a name change from "Michael E. DeBakey High School for Health Professions at Qatar" to “International School for Medical Sciences and Engineering.” This decision affected more than 400 students enrolled in ISME. However, a change of administration for the school was made later that year, allowing the school to remain open for future academic years.

== See also ==
- Americans in Qatar
- DeBakey High School for Health Professions
