= Lois DeBakey =

Lebanese-American physician (1920–2016)

- Born: 6 July 1920; Lake Charles, Louisiana, U.S.
- Died: 15 June 2016 (aged 95)
- Education: Tulane University
- Relatives: Michael DeBakey (brother); Selma DeBakey (sister)

Lois DeBakey (6 July 1920 – 15 June 2016) was an American professor of scientific communications at Baylor College of Medicine and Tulane University School of Medicine. and with her sister Selma, created the first medical school communication courses that were curriculum-approved. DeBakey served on the National Library of Medicine Board of Regents and was the sister of Michael DeBakey, the cardiovascular surgeon and medical educator.

== Early life and education ==
Lois DeBakey was raised in Lake Charles, Louisiana by her parents Raheeja and Shaker DeBakey, who were Lebanese Christians that fled the Ottoman Empire. Lois is the sister to Selma DeBakey and Michael DeBakey.

DeBakey attended Tulane's Sophie Newcomb College where she earned a B.A. in mathematics and was part of Phi Beta Kappa, an honorary scholastic society. At Tulane University she also earned a master's degree and a PhD in literature and linguistics.

== Career ==
Lois DeBakey, along with her sister, Selma, worked to encourage physicians to avoid complicated medical jargon. The DeBakey sisters traveled around the world giving presentations to help doctors be more precise and clear when speaking with patients. In 1962 the DeBakey sisters created and taught the first communication course approved for a medical school curriculum at Tulane University School of Medicine and in 1968 they moved to Baylor College of Medicine in Houston, Texas, where Lois DeBakey worked as a Professor of Scientific Communication. The DeBakey sisters shared an office in the Texas Medical Center, just down the hall from their brother Michael's office.

While at Tulane University, DeBakey was an English Department faculty member and served on the editorial board of the Tulane University Studies in English publication.

During her career, Lois DeBakey served on the editorial board of the Journal of the American Medical Association, was chairman for MEDLINE and Index Medicus databases of the National Library of Medicine, and was a member of the National Library of Medicine's Board of Regents from 1982–1986.

== Honors and awards ==
- Membership in the Golden Key National Honour Society
- Harold Swanberg Distinguished Service Award of the American Medical Writer's Association
- The Medical Library Association's first John P. McGovern Award Lectureship, 1983
