= Navin Valrani =

Indian businessman

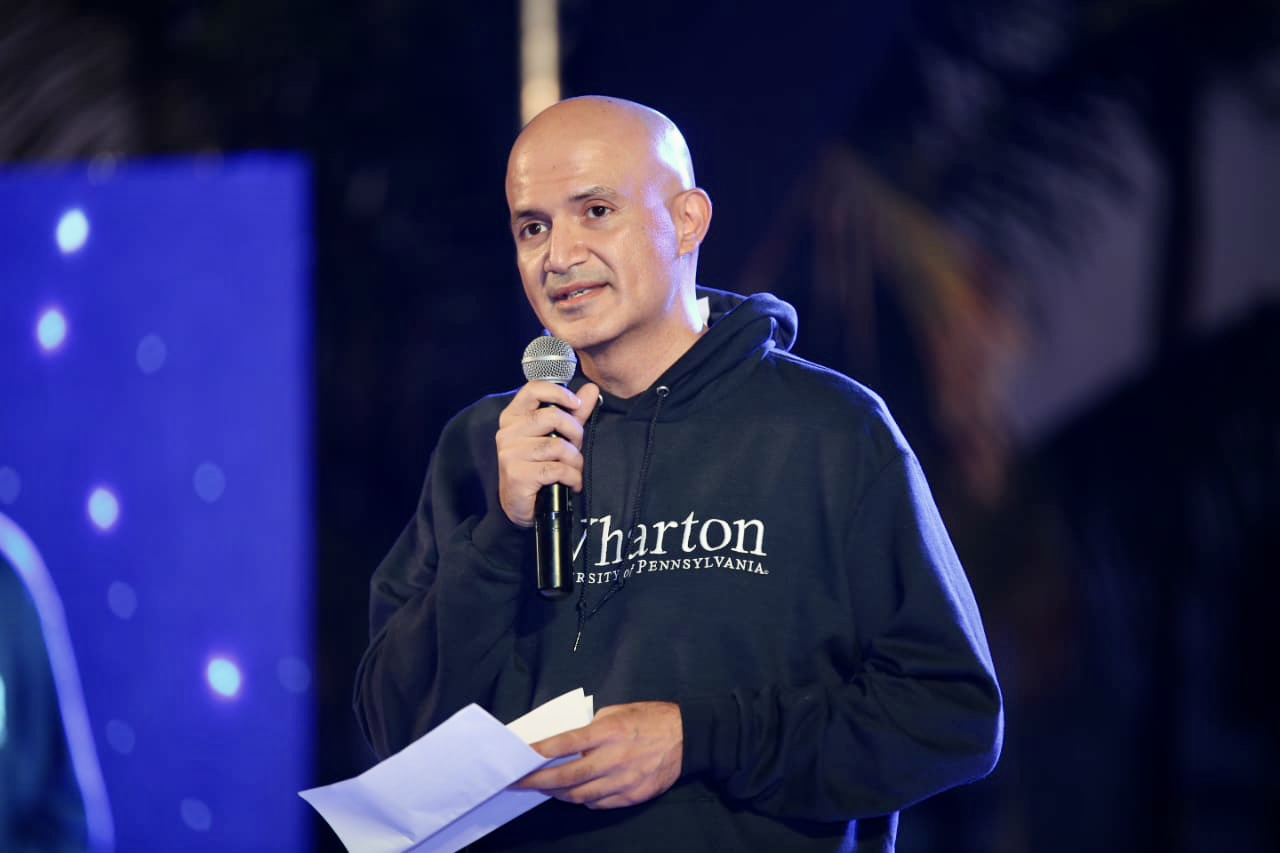
- Valrani in 2018
- Citizenship: Indian
- Education: University of Pennsylvania (The Wharton School); London Business School (MBA)
- Occupations: Vice chairman and group managing director Al Shirawi Group; CEO, Arcadia Education

Navin Valrani is an Indian businessman and the vice chairman and group managing director of Al Shirawi Group, a private family-owned industrial conglomerate based in Dubai, UAE. He is also the CEO of Arcadia Education, which is Al Shirawi Group's venture into K-12 education.

== Education and personal life ==
Navin Valrani is one of three sons of Mohan G. Valrani, an Indian businessman and one of the two co-founders of the Al Shirawi Group.

Valrani spent his childhood in Dubai, UAE, and received his education at Dubai College. In 1993, he graduated from The Wharton School, the undergraduate business school at the University of Pennsylvania. He went on to get an MBA from the London Business School, and a Masters in Education from the Graduate School of Education at the University of Pennsylvania. In 2023, Valrani earned a doctorate in education after he defended his dissertation on "How Teachers’ Cultural and Educational Backgrounds Influence Technology Use in Early Childhood Education".

Valrani is a member of the Board of Overseers at the University of Pennsylvania's Graduate School of Education. and member on the Advisory Council of Harvard Kennedy School's Mossaver-Rahmani Center. He is also a former member of the Wharton Executive Board for Europe, Middle East, and Africa.

Valrani was recognized as the Facilities Management CEO of the Year in the 2014 Arabian Business Indian CEO Awards. Presently, he holds the second position in Facilities Management Middle East's ranking of the Facilities Management Power 50. Furthermore, he was featured on the Forbes Middle East list of Top Indian Business Leaders 2017: The Next Generation. In 2018, Navin Valrani was acknowledged as one of the "UAE's most influential business leaders" in the Construction Week Power 100.

Navin Valrani is married to Monica Valrani, who is the CEO of Ladybird Nurseries in Dubai. Monica Valrani is the owner of Dubai's first dedicated LEED Gold certified early years learning facility. Navin and Monica Valrani have two sons.

== Career ==
Navin continues to lead the Education, Engineering and Healthcare cluster of companies in the Al Shirawi Group. He is presently CEO of the following organizations:

- Arcadia Education
- The Leminar Group
- Al Shirawi Facilities Management (FM) LLC
- Al Shirawi Electrical & Mechanical Engineering (ASEME) Company LLC
- Al Shirawi Contracting
- Visionwood International LLC
- Oasis Coils and Coatings
- Al Shirawi US Chillers

In June 2017, Navin Valrani designed the region's first business curriculum at the primary school level for students attending Arcadia School in Dubai. He presently teaches the curriculum at the school, known as the "Jr MBA", to pupils from Year 1 upwards. His dedication to teaching and service led on to him being awarded the William B. Castetter Alumni Award of Merit by the University of Pennsylvania's Graduate School of Education in 2019.

== Philanthropy ==
Valrani created the Monica and Navin Valrani Scholarship fund to help female students complete a university education. He also became a campaign committee member at London Business School to successfully help the school raise over £100m by 2018.
