= Animal Enterprise Terrorism Act =

United States federal law

- Enacted by: the 109th United States Congress

Citations
- Public law: Pub. L. 109–374 (text) (PDF)
- Statutes at Large: 120 Stat. 2652

Codification
- Acts amended: Animal Enterprise Protection Act of 1992 (Pub. L. 102–346)
- Titles amended: Title 18
- U.S.C. sections amended: 18 U.S.C. § 43

Legislative history
- Introduced in the Senate as S.3880 by Jim Inhofe (R–OK) on September 8, 2006; Passed the Senate on September 30, 2006 (unanimous consent); Passed the House on November 13, 2006 (voice vote); Signed into law by President George W. Bush on November 27, 2006

The Animal Enterprise Terrorism Act (AETA) of 2006 is a United States federal law (Pub. L. 109–374 (text) (PDF); 18 U.S.C. § 43) that prohibits any person from engaging in certain conduct "for the purpose of damaging or interfering with the operations of an animal enterprise." The statute covers any act that either "damages or causes the loss of any real or personal property" or "places a person in reasonable fear" of injury.

== Background ==
The law amends the Animal Enterprise Protection Act of 1992 (Pub. L. 102–346) and gives the U.S. Department of Justice greater authority to target animal rights activists. The AETA does so by broadening the definition of "animal enterprise" to include academic and commercial enterprises that use or sell animals or animal products. It also increases the existing penalties, includes penalties based on the amount of economic damage caused, and allows animal enterprises to seek restitution.

The law was originally introduced in the 109th Congress by Thomas Petri (R-WI) and Senators Dianne Feinstein (D-CA) and Jim Inhofe (R-OK). The final version of the bill, S. 3880., was passed in the United States Senate on September 29, 2006, by unanimous consent, a Senate procedure that is used to expedite the passage of non-controversial bills without an actual vote. On November 13, 2006, the House passed the bill under suspension of the rules, a procedure generally used to quickly pass non-controversial bills. The lone dissenting statement was made by Representative Dennis Kucinich, who said that the bill was "written in such a way as to have a chilling effect on the exercise of the constitutional rights of protest." Neither Rep. Kucinich nor any other members of the House of Representatives called for a recorded vote; the bill passed with a voice vote. The bill was signed by President George W. Bush on November 27, 2006. Earlier versions of the bill were known as S. 1926 and H.R. 4239. The bill is described by the author as being intended to "provide the Department of Justice the necessary authority to apprehend, prosecute, and convict individuals committing animal enterprise terror."

== Savings clause ==
The law contains a savings clause that indicates it should not be construed to "prohibit any expressive conduct (including peaceful picketing or other peaceful demonstration) protected from legal prohibition by the First Amendment to the Constitution." However, by its own terms, the statute criminalizes acts such as "intimidation." Furthermore, prosecutions under AETA require using evidence of otherwise lawful free speech in order to demonstrate a "course of conduct" as proof of purpose or possible conspiracy.

== Reaction ==
The Animal Enterprise Terrorism Act was overwhelmingly embraced by the pharmaceutical industry. The National Association for Biomedical Research (NABR) lauded the passage of the bill stating: "Today, the AETA provides greater protection for the biomedical research community and their families against intimidation and harassment, and addresses for the first time in federal law, campaigns of secondary and tertiary targeting that cause economic damage to research enterprises."

Animal rights and civil liberties groups, however, largely opposed the passage of the legislation. Camille Hankins, a representative of Win Animal Rights, asserted that the legislation infringed upon the First Amendment rights of free speech and assembly: "It's overly broad, overly vague and restricts freedom of speech and freedom of assembly." She added: "I think this legislation was bought and paid for, by the pharmaceutical industry primarily." However, Jerry Vlasak, spokesman for the North American Animal Liberation Press Office, suggested the bill would have little impact on the movement because underground activists "don't really care about those laws" and law enforcement agencies had already "gone after" effective above-ground activists. The American Kennel Club, a dog breeding organization, endorsed the bill, because it contains "explicit language" which protects the right of protesters to engage in "peaceful picketing or other peaceful demonstration."

The American Civil Liberties Union (ACLU) did not oppose the bill, but expressed concerns that "minor changes [were] necessary to make the bill less likely to chill or threaten freedom of speech." The ACLU requested that the bill be amended to define what was meant by "real or personal property," to narrow the definition of "animal enterprise," and to substantially reduce penalties for conspiracy convictions under the statute. The particular changes proposed by the ACLU are not present in the final version of the AETA.

In 2013, animal rights activists filed a lawsuit to challenge the AETA for criminalizing what they called protected First Amendment speech. Their lawsuit was dismissed by a federal judge who determined that the plaintiffs had no standing.

== Criminal prosecutions ==
The bill was passed in response to the then-ongoing prosecution of members of Stop Huntingdon Animal Cruelty (SHAC), an activist group that worked to close animal testing laboratories. Six members of the group were charged and put on trial for a "multi-faceted" and decentralized grassroots activist campaign against Huntingdon Life Sciences. While there was no proof that the actual defendants committed or had any knowledge of the overwhelming majority of the illegal acts at issue, they were convicted under the AETA's conspiracy provisions. On appeal, the Third Circuit upheld the convictions because the defendants’ membership in the group, participation in political protests, as well as unrelated speeches, interviews, publications, and internet postings constituted "sufficient circumstantial evidence" for a jury to infer a conspiracy. One defendant was convicted for providing "technical assistance" for the group's website because the website was then used by others to organize unlawful acts. At least one of the defendants was placed in an exceptionally restrictive Communication Management Unit, reserved for inmates the government considers terrorist threats.

In 2009, four individuals were indicted under the Animal Enterprise Terrorism Act for alleged harassment, intimidation, and violent acts at the homes of professors conducting research involving animal testing. While the charges were eventually dismissed, the defendants were placed under house arrest for almost a year. The FBI alleges that these individuals were part of groups engaged in trespassing, attempted forcible entry of a private residence, and distribution of leaflets that resulted in the firebombing of two residences.

In July 2014, two men were indicted for "animal enterprise terrorism" after releasing 2,000 foxes and mink from fur farms. Their lawyer announced plans to challenge the constitutionality of the law.

== Confessions ==
In July 2019, Charlotte Laws confessed in an article that she may have violated the Animal Enterprise Terrorism Act when she helped rescue pigeons out from under Torrance Police and animal control.

== See also ==
- Ag-gag
- Animal law
- Joseph Buddenberg, activist who pleaded guilty and was sentenced for violations of the AETA
