= Joseph Buddenberg =

American animal rights activist

- Born: 1984 (age 41–42)
- Status: Released
- Conviction: Conspiracy to violate the Animal Enterprise Terrorism Act
- Penalty: 24 months in prison, $423,477 in restitution

Joseph Buddenberg is an American animal rights activist.

In 2009 at age 25, Buddenberg was indicted along with three others on charges of Animal Enterprise Terrorism for protesting and attempting to forcefully enter the home of an animal researcher at the University of California. The AETA4 case was dismissed by U.S. District Judge Ronald M. Whyte in 2010 citing that the charges were not specific enough.

On July 24, 2015, Buddenberg, 31, and his co-conspirator Nicole Kissane were arrested and federally indicted by the FBI after releasing 5,740 mink from fur farms and sabotaging fur industry targets.

In 2016, both Buddenberg and Kissane pleaded guilty to the charge of Conspiracy to Violate the Animal Enterprise Terrorism Act —Title 18, U.S.C., Section 43 (a) (1), (2) (c) and (b) (3) (A). On May 2, Joseph was sentenced to 24 months in prison, two years of supervised release, and $423,477 in restitution. He served his sentence at USP Lompoc and was released on February 7, 2018.
