= Debakey forceps =

Surgical instrument

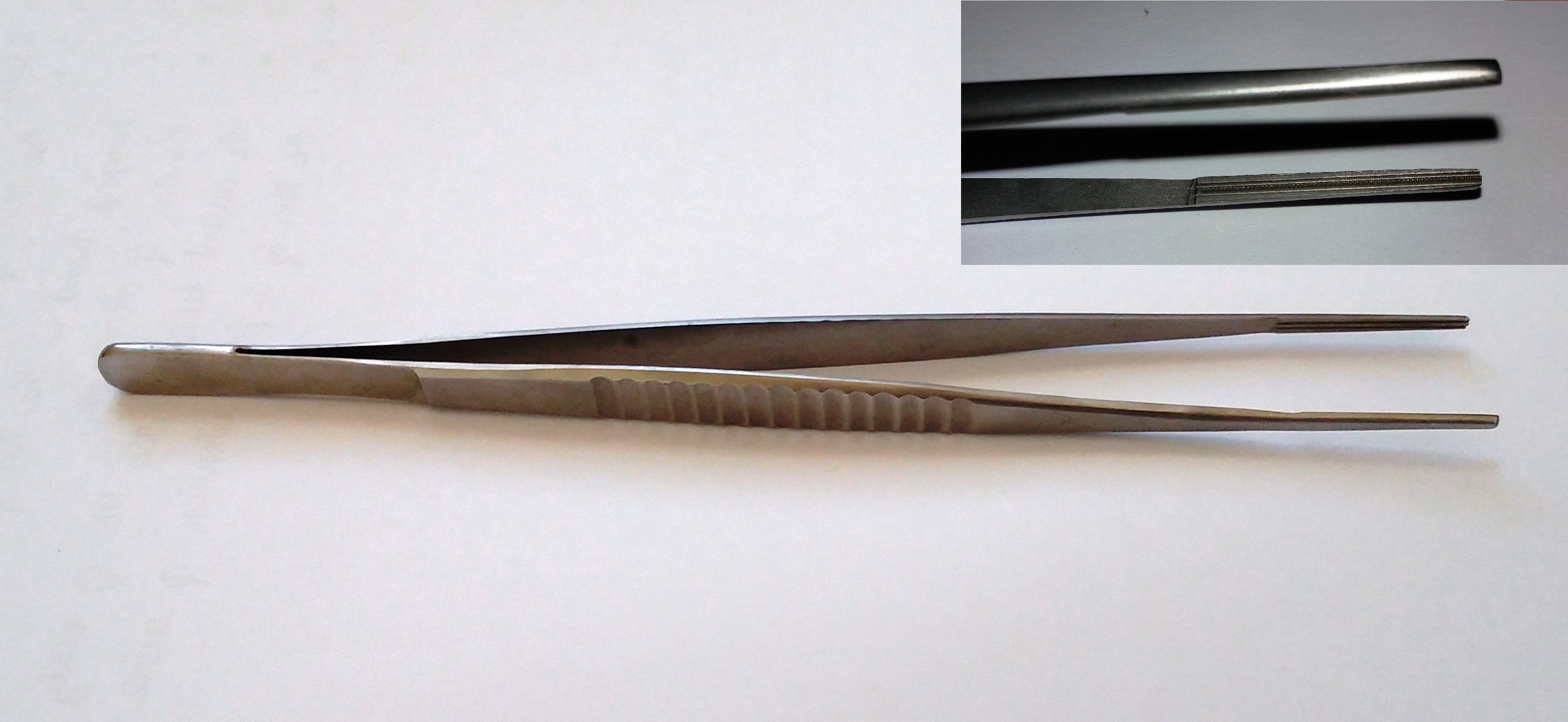
Debakey forceps

Debakey forceps are a type of atraumatic tissue forceps used in vascular procedures to avoid tissue damage during manipulation. They are typically large (some examples are upwards of 12 inches (36 cm) long), and have a distinct coarsely ribbed grip panel, as opposed to the finer ribbing on most other tissue forceps.

They were developed by Michael DeBakey, along with other innovations during his tenure at Baylor College of Medicine.

== See also ==
- Instruments used in general surgery
