= Andrew Trull =

British chemist

Andrew Kenneth Trull (1956–2004) was a noted chemist who put forward many important studies into immunology and other matters. He worked mainly at Papworth Hospital but also presented his work all over the world.

== Publications ==
A list of many of his publications is available at ResearchGate.

== Personal life ==
Andrew Kenneth Trull was born on 13 February 1956 in Lambeth, the second son of Kenneth J Tull and Cynthia Jill (née Tovey). He married Rosemary J Young in Cambridge in 1985. They had two sons and a daughter: Thomas Christopher in 1987, Nicholas John in 1991 and Alice Louise P in 1993. He died at home in Cheveley Park, Cheveley on 31 March 2004.
