= Foundation for Biomedical Research =

American animal welfare organization

- Formation: 1981; 45 years ago
- Headquarters: Washington, D.C.
- President: Matthew Baily
- Website: https://www.fbresearch.org/

The Foundation for Biomedical Research (FBR) is an American nonprofit organization, 501(c)(3), located in Washington, DC. Established in 1981, the organization is dedicated to informing the news media, teachers, and other groups about the need for lab animals in medical and scientific research. The organization, together with its partner, the National Association for Biomedical Research (NABR), argues that promoting animal research leads to improved health for both humans and animals.

Its founding president was Frankie Trull.

== Animal research ==
According to the U.S. Department of Agriculture (USDA), the total number of animals used in that country in 2005 was almost 1.2 million, excluding rats and mice. Some animal rights supporters believe that alternatives exist for animal models in research; however the vast majority of scientists believe there are no adequate alternatives which truly replace the roles which research animals play. In fact, recent research shows that 98% of the current drug pipeline relies on either dogs or non-human primates.

According to the Foundation for Biomedical Research, animal research has been responsible for every medical breakthrough over the past century, although this position has been disputed by some animal rights activists and organizations. It cites animal research as leading to advances in antibiotics, blood transfusions, dialysis, organ transplantation, vaccinations, chemotherapy, bypass surgery, joint replacement, and methods for prevention, treatment, cure and control of disease, pain and suffering.

=== Nonhuman primates ===
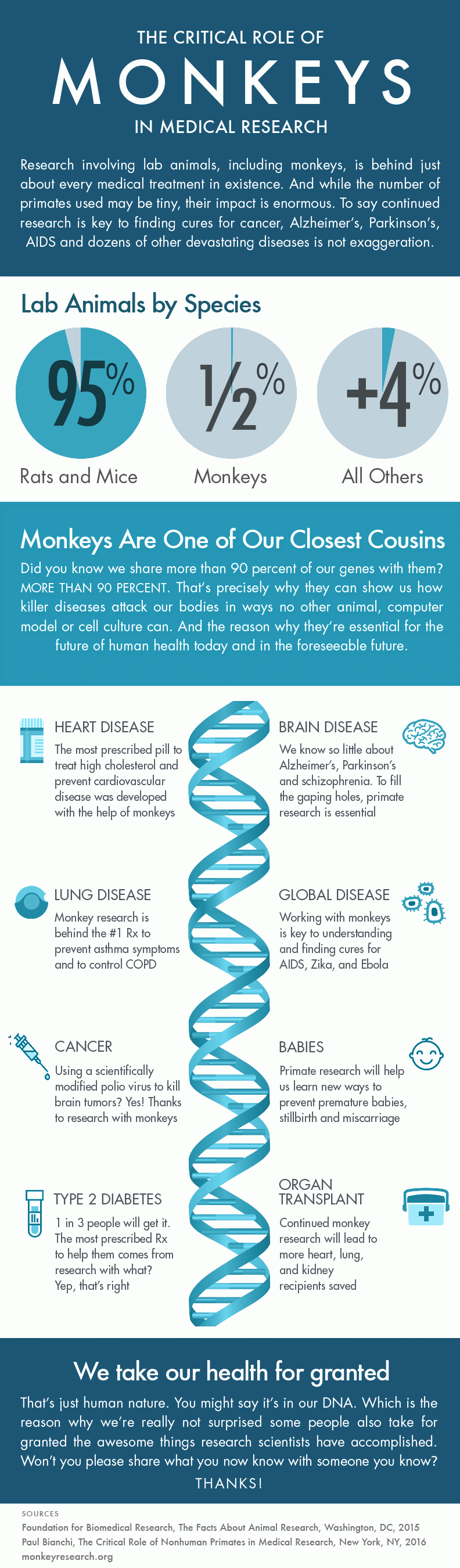
This graphic depicts several advances made with nonhuman primate research and a series of pie charts which show the percentages of total lab animals by species.

Nonhuman primates have been at the forefront of animal research controversy over the last several years even though they represent less than one percent of all animals models used. In August 2016, to counter criticism from animal rights' groups, a white paper coauthored by nine of the most premier scientific groups and titled The Critical Role of Nonhuman Primates in Medical Research was released. Because of their incredible similarity to humans, primates such as rhesus macaques and chimpanzees, up until the National Institutes of Health ended public funding for chimpanzee research, have greatly contributed to many areas of medicine. Some specific advances, according to the white paper, are: the development of the MMR vaccine, the treatment of leprosy, HIV medication, a vaccine for hepatitis B, and improvements in cancer treatment. One of the most recent advancements has been the development of a highly effective vaccine against the Zika virus, which should soon be protecting both the people and primates that are most at risk of infection.

=== Dogs ===
Dogs have been used in research for decades and have been invaluable for treating many human and canine illnesses. Dogs contract many of the diseases humans do, from heart disease to cancer and they are also exposed to the same environment as humans. Canine research has led to many significant breakthroughs such as hip replacements, development of cancer treatments, and research in stem cells, diabetes, and Alzheimer's disease. Treatments for heartworms, parasites, and vaccinations against parvovirus, rabies, and canine distemper have also come from canine models.

=== Cats ===
Cats, like dogs, have also proven to be extremely helpful for developing treatments for both human and feline diseases. Cats have been a mainstay in research studies of neurological, cardiovascular, and respiratory diseases and the immune system. In particular, they have been valuable models for understanding the function of the neuron, the chemical transmission of nerve impulses, and the functional organization of the brain. Neuroscientists studying cats have provided a map of the circuitry of the vertebral cortex revealing the major pathways that send signals from the eye to the brain. Cats have also been invaluable for research into the treatment of leukemia and of both feline and human breast cancer. Feline leukemia used to be one of the most common killers of cats and about 85% died within three years of their diagnosis. However, with their help, scientists have developed a vaccine for feline leukemia.

=== Rodents ===
In the U.S., the numbers of rats and mice used in animal research is estimated at 20 million a year, or 95% of the total number of lab animals. Other rodents commonly used are guinea pigs, hamsters, and gerbils. Mice are the most commonly used vertebrate species because of their size, low cost, ease of handling, and fast reproduction rate. Mice also have genomes that are very similar to the human genome. This similarity allows researchers to recreate human diseases, such as breast cancer, in mice in order to understand how genes affect the development of disease. The Foundation advocates the highest quality of animal care and treatment, stating that the use of animals in research is a privilege, and that animals deserve our respect and the best possible care.

== Activities ==
The Foundation for Biomedical Research conducts educational programs for the news media, teachers, students and parents, pet owners and other groups.

FBR publishes a subscriber-based daily news service called Total E-clips featuring biomedical research news, medical breakthroughs, political and legislative and activism news.

Since 1981, the FBR has monitored and analyzed the activities of animal rights organizations relating to researchers and institutions.

== See also ==
- Animal testing
- History of animal testing
