= Selma DeBakey =

American professor of scientific communication (1915–2003)

- Born: 3 December 1915; Lake Charles, Louisiana, U.S.
- Died: 6 March 2013 (aged 97)
- Education: Tulane University
- Relatives: Lois DeBakey (sister); Michael DeBakey (brother)
- Scientific career
- Workplaces: Baylor College of Medicine

Selma DeBakey (3 December 1915 – 6 March 2013) was an American professor of scientific communication at Baylor College of Medicine who improved the field of medical writing and editing by designing and teaching courses to help doctors improve their academic writing and provide clear and concise medical information to patients. Selma worked closely with two of her siblings at Baylor College of Medicine, sister Lois DeBakey, a professor of scientific communication, and brother Michael DeBakey, a cardiovascular surgeon.

== Early life and education ==
Raised in Lake Charles, Louisiana, by her parents Shaker and Raheeja DeBakey, DeBakey was one of five children with siblings Michael, Lois, Ernest, and Selena. The DeBakey children excelled educationally with both Michael and Ernest becoming surgeons and Selma and Lois earning advanced degrees and becoming college professors.

DeBakey attended Tulane's Sophie Newcomb College where she earned her bachelor's degree in English with honors in languages and took postgraduate courses in languages and philosophy. While taking graduate courses Selma started helping her brother Michael edit his medical research papers as he prepared them for publication, a foreshadowing to her career in medical communication.

== Career ==
In 1941 DeBakey headed the editorial department at the Alton Ochsner Foundation and in 1944 she became director of the Department of Medical Communication at the Ochsner Clinic Foundation, a hospital system in Louisiana. DeBakey served as a medical writer and guest editor for numerous medical journals and became the founding editor of the Cardiovascular Center Bulletin.

Along with her sister Lois, DeBakey created the first communication course approved for medical school curriculum in 1962. The DeBakey sisters were recruited in 1968 by Baylor College of Medicine and moved to Houston, Texas where they taught courses and symposiums on medical communication. The medical communication lectures focused on teaching doctors to avoid medical jargon and improve the quality of medical writing through things like avoiding passive voice.

Baylor College of Medicine has a DeBakey Scholarship Fund in Medical Humanities created in honor of Selma, Lois, and Michael DeBakey.
