= DeBakey High School for Health Professions =

Public magnet high school in Houston, Texas, United States

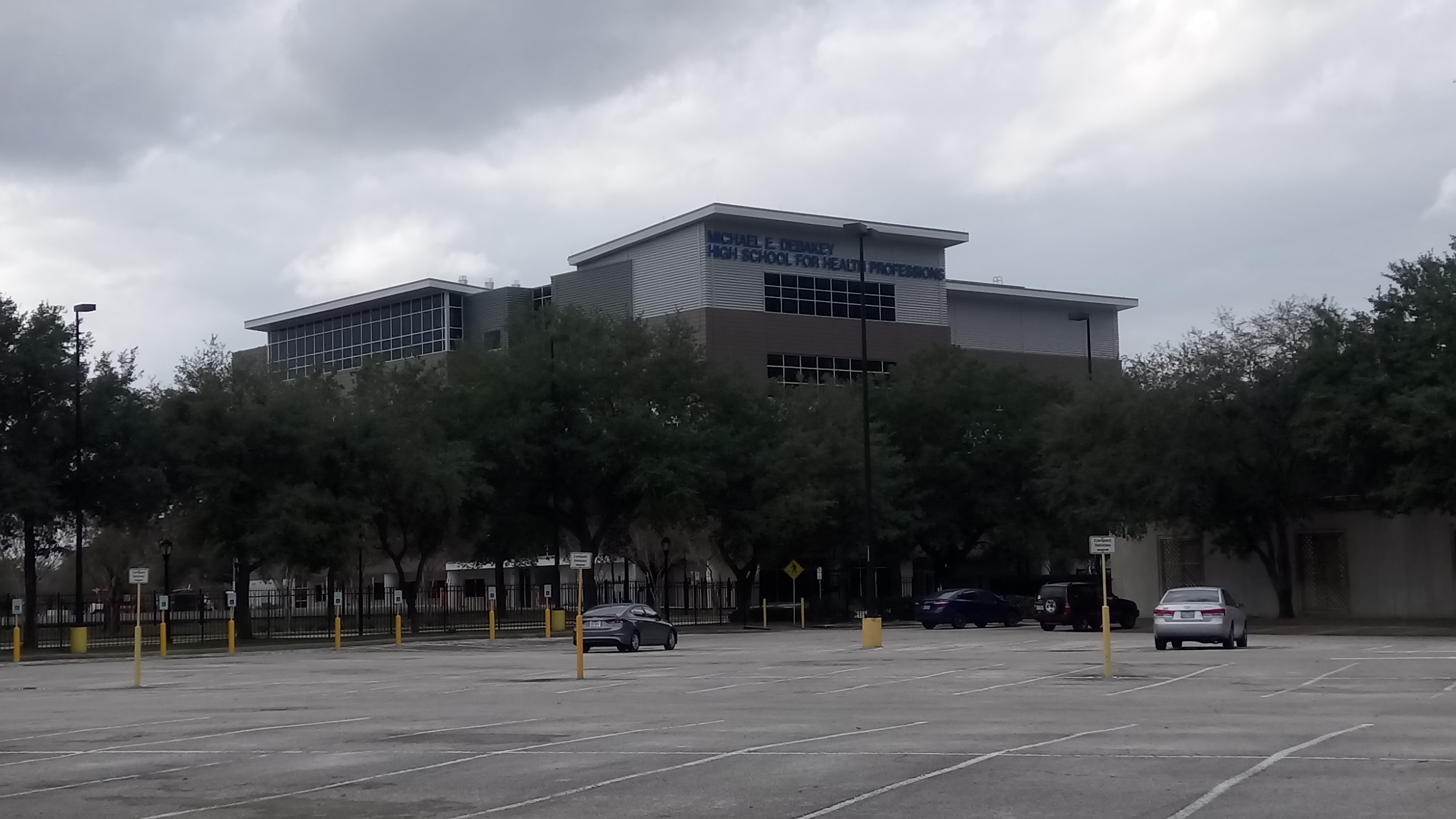

Location
- 2545 Pressler Street, Houston, Texas 29.705184°N 95.408327°W

Information
- Type: Public School (US)
- School district: Houston Independent School District
- Principal: Jesse Herrera
- Staff: 55.94 (FTE)
- Grades: 9–12
- Enrollment: 890 (2017-18)
- Student to teacher ratio: 15.91
- Mascot: Viper
- Texas Education Agency Rating: Exemplary (2010–2011)
- Magnet: Medical Professions
- Website: debakey.houstonisd.org

Michael E. DeBakey High School for Health Professions is a medical secondary school located in the Medical Center area of Houston, Texas, United States. It is a part of the Houston Independent School District.

It has been named the number one public high school in Houston by the Houston Chronicle, the Houston Press, and Children at Risk and number 26 in best high schools in the United States by US News in 2013. DeBakey High School, which serves grades 9 through 12, is a part of the Houston Independent School District and is west of the Texas Medical Center. It is the only Houston magnet high school for health professions. The school was named after Michael E. DeBakey, a famous heart surgeon. DeBakey does not automatically take in students from the surrounding neighborhood; the surrounding neighborhood is zoned to Lamar High School.

DeBakey was a 2018 recipient of the U.S. Department of Education's Blue Ribbon School of Excellence award.

The school has a campus in Qatar. It is located in Al Messila, Doha, Qatar. The school offers a U.S. curriculum with a focus on science, mathematics, and medical science, preparing students for careers in medicine and science.

== History ==
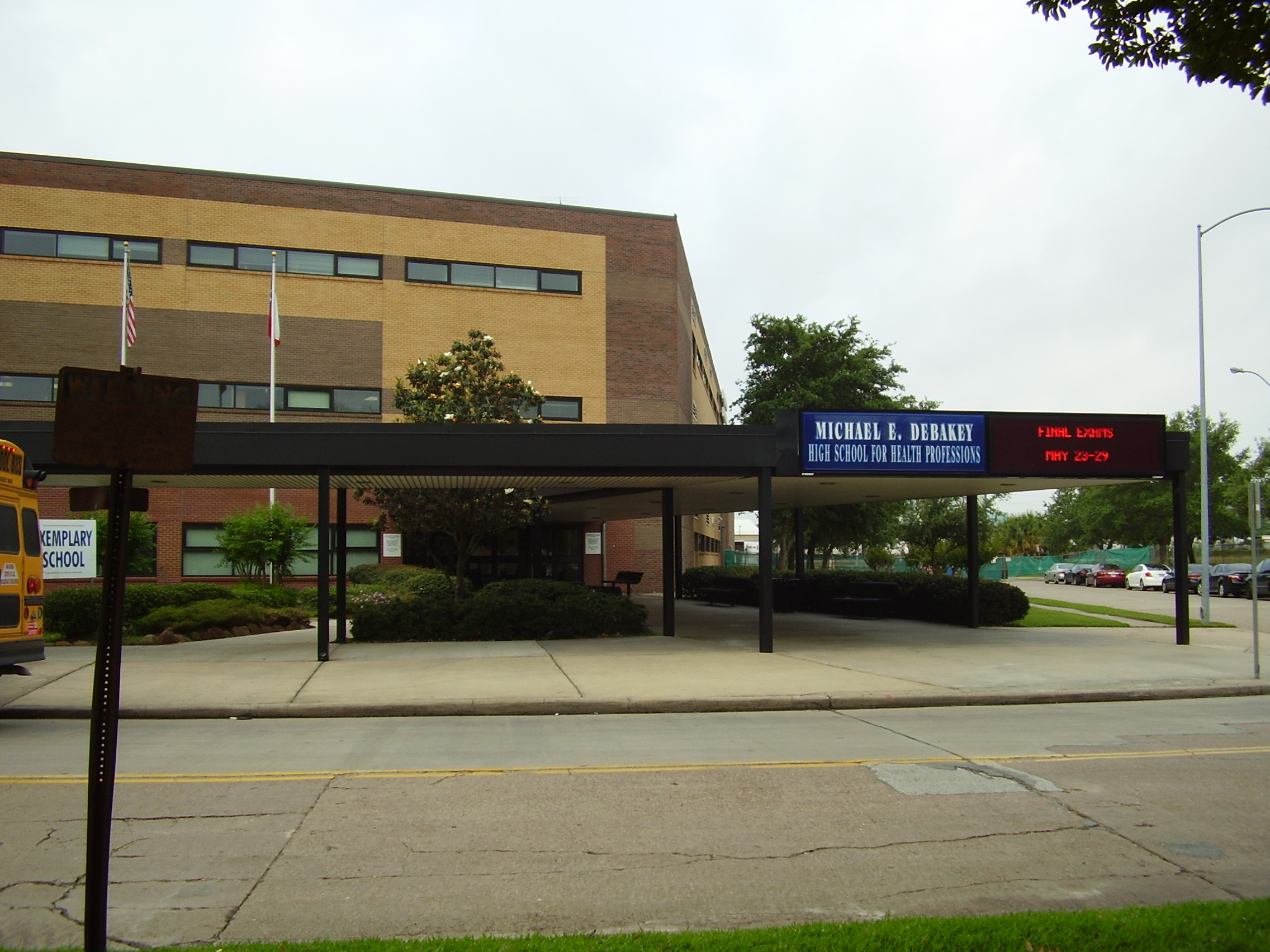
Former campus

With an initial student body of 45, the High School for Health Professions opened in 1972 as part of a partnership between the Houston Independent School District and the Baylor College of Medicine. The curriculum was shaped in its early years as DeBakey was the world's first high school to specialize in medical professions. Perry Weston was the first principal.

In the 1984–1985 school year, DeBakey had the lowest percentage of failing grades in the Houston Independent School District. In the fall semester, 7% of grades were failing, while in the spring semester, 6% of grades were failing.

The school was renamed after Michael E. DeBakey in 1996.

The school was a National Blue Ribbon School award winner in 1997–98 and 2003. In 1998 the U.S. Department of Education named DeBakey as one of ten "New American High Schools".

Plans for the school to be relocated within the Texas Medical Center were made but soon canceled because the Houston Independent School District decided to renovate instead. Renovations started August 2006 and ended in 2008.

In 2006 the Houston Independent School District board considered moving the Kay On-Going Education Center, a special school for pregnant girls, to an unused area within DeBakey High School. DeBakey had around 30 unused classrooms, and district administrators argued that the Texas Medical Center location would be of use to pregnant students. Jennifer Radcliffe of the Houston Chronicle said that the proposed plan yielded a "mixed" reaction in DeBakey parents and students. Some signed a petition asking the district not to merge Kay On-Going into DeBakey. The district did not go forward with the plan. Instead it moved into Kay On-Going into the Carter Career Center in the Fifth Ward.

The Supreme Education Council of Qatar opened a branch version of DeBakey, DeBakey High School for Health Professions at Qatar, in its country, with Charlesetta Deason, formerly principal of the Houston school, as the head of the Qatar school. Deason began her term as the Houston DeBakey principal in 1989.

In 2012, four DeBakey juniors qualified for the Intel International Science and Engineering Fair, two of them placed second in their respective categories detailing chitosan nanoparticles.

On December 15, 2014, groundbreaking for a new DeBakey campus occurred. This campus opened in 2017.

The former DeBakey campus on Shenandoah hosted students from Braeburn Elementary School after Hurricane Harvey occurred in 2017.

== Campus ==
The campus, with five stories and 198,000 square feet (18,400 m^{2}) of space, is located on the ex-Hornberger Conference Center site, in the western side of the Texas Medical Center, near Holcombe Boulevard (which turns into Bellaire Boulevard). The campus's land was donated to the school district.

It has a price tag of $65 million, and the planned capacity is about 900–1,000 students. In addition to science laboratories, the facility includes mock hospital rooms and patient care, dentistry, and rehabilitation laboratories. The current campus opened in June 2017.

There is also a campus located in Doha, Qatar.

== Admissions ==
Like many HISD magnet schools, DeBakey High School uses a lottery system for admission, though students must have a minimum matrix score of 80 to apply. Students rank their school choice before being either accepted, waitlisted, or denied. As of 2024, 1441 students applied for 250 seats.

== Academics ==
DeBakey offers pre-advanced placement classes in mathematics, science, social sciences, foreign languages, and English in 9th and 10th grade, as well as 25 Advanced Placement classes: AP English Literature and Composition, AP English Language and Composition, AP Spanish Language and Culture, AP World History: Modern, AP US History, AP Computer Science Principles, AP Calculus AB, AP Calculus BC, AP Statistics, AP Macroeconomics, AP US Government and Politics, AP Physics 1, AP Physics 2, AP Physics C: Mechanics, AP Physics C: Electricity and Magnetism, AP Seminar, AP Research, AP Statistics, AP Chemistry, AP Biology, AP Environmental Science, AP Psychology, AP Human Geography, AP Music Theory, and AP Studio Art, which includes 2-D Design and Drawing.

The school requires students to fulfill these class requirements to graduate as DeBakey scholars:

- 5 years of mathematics (culminating in AP Calculus or AP Statistics)
- 5 years of science (culminating in an AP-level course)
- 4 years of health sciences
- 4 years of social studies
- 3 years of a foreign language (same language for all 3 years)
- 1 year of fine arts or theater
- 1 year of physical education

William G. Ouchi, author of Making Schools Work: A Revolutionary Plan to Get Your Children the Education They Need, wrote that the large number of course requirements make it so that "virtually all of the courses are required, and every class is full." Its required coursework, as of 2008, includes four years each of health sciences, English, mathematics, science, and social studies.

DeBakey has been widely recognized for its performance in academics, particularly in math and science. The students score an average of a 3.7/5 on their AP examinations, which is higher than the typical average of 3.03. In 2011, DeBakey was ranked as the number 11 best school for math and science by the USNews Rankings, and it has been recognized each year for black student performance on the AP Calculus AB examination by the College Board.

== Academic performance and funding ==
Typically students score higher than average schools on the SAT and the ACT, scoring an average composite 1340 and 31 respectively, and perform exceptionally well on state tests. Almost all students attending DeBakey graduate from high school. As of 2011 DeBakey's per-pupil spending was $8,807 per student, $1,450 over the Greater Houston average, $7,355.

In 2000 $8 million in university scholarship funds, with a per-student average of $47,059, was distributed to 170 students in the DeBakey class of 2000.

As of 2008 98% of its students of each class matriculate to colleges and universities. Typically the University of Houston and Baylor College of Medicine give scholarships covering all tuition expenses to about ten students per class. About 4% of the graduates of DeBakey in the 1975–1988 period attended medical school while the national percentage is 0.6%.

According to the 2014 accountability rating by the Texas Education Agency, DeBakey high school met the standard, and had academic achievements in Reading/English Language Arts, Mathematics, Science, and Social Studies. DeBakey was also in the top 25 percent in closing performance gaps.

== Health science ==
Each year, students are required to complete a Health Science class, which serve as the principle magnet program for the school. The course selection includes:

- 9th grade- A full year course on medical terminology, moral action as a health practitioner, and medical jobs. This is intended to act as a primer for the future course work.
- 10th grade- A full year course on anatomy and physiology.
- 11th grade- 3 sets of 2 month programs rotating around dentistry, physical medicine and rehabilitation, and medical laboratory, through which students gain hands-on experience with activities such as performing reflex tests, making mouth molds through plaster, and performing urine and blood specimen exams. This class is 2 periods long.
- 12th grade- 3 sets of 2 month programs rotating around biomedical-engineering and world health, physiology, and preceptorship. The preceptorship program revolves around 3 sets of 6 day shadowing opportunities around the Texas Medical Center, with programs such as research at Rice University, neurology at the Veteran's Affair Hospital, nutritional research at the Children's Hospital, and a look into the Houston Veterinarian Society. This class is 2 periods long.

Students ultimately interact and are able to learn first-hand from physicians, surgeons and other professionals who work at various institutions of the Texas Medical Center. They frequently witness live surgery there and attend seminars, making the learning experience unlike courses offered at other public schools in Houston. During either their sophomore or junior year, students are required to complete a CPR certification, which can be obtained in class or outside school.

Students are also offered health science related electives, including medical Spanish, history of medicine, pharmacy, and medical microbiology.

== Sports ==
Although DeBakey does not have its own sports teams, the school has some athletic clubs such as Basketball Club or Volleyball Club, which compete with other local high schools. For example, the basketball club at DeBakey High School often competes against HAIS. Despite the lack of sports, many students thrive by practicing outside of school. Lynnsey Nguyen, a student who graduated from DeBakey in 2015, was recruited for the University of St. Thomas volleyball team.

== Orchestra ==
The DeBakey orchestra is composed of musicians from 9th through 12th grades selected after a rigorous audition process. The orchestra includes strings, woodwinds, brass, percussion and piano. The class is offered as part of the school's fine arts curricula, providing the students with the opportunity to earn fine arts and/or elective credits. As part of its partnership with Houston's Orchestra On Call, the DeBakey Orchestra presents concerts for patients, families and caregivers throughout the Texas Medical Center and other health care institutions, offering its students a purposeful way of sharing their musical talent with the community as well as providing them with an enriching outlet for artistic and emotional expression. Participation in these performances qualifies for community service hours. The DeBakey orchestra is led by the music director, Jordan Stewart.

== School uniforms ==
Students in the school are required to wear school uniforms. In 2010, the school announced that its new uniform code will require students to buy shirts from the parent teacher organization. The shirts must have a DeBakey logo. This led to protests from students and parents who were unwilling to spend additional money on school-mandated clothes; DeBakey's student body as of that year was 55% free lunch or reduced lunch. As of 2024, all students are required to wear medical scrubs in colors corresponding with their grade on days they have health science class.

== Student body ==
As of 2013–2014 school year, the school was made up of 59% female and 41% male students. Of these, 19% were African American, 42% were Asian, 27% were Hispanic, <1% were Native American, and 10% were White. 100% of DeBakey students passed the Texas Assessment of Knowledge and Skills. In addition, 45% of the students were on free or reduced lunch.

In 2008 Ouchi characterized the student body as "diverse". Deason stated in 1999 that the student body, smaller than that of comprehensive high schools, "creates a family atmosphere"; that year there were 730 students.

The school offers more than twenty-five clubs. Clubs include the newly added European Club, Writing Club, Health Occupation Students of America, BSU (Black Student Union), VISA (Vietnamese International Student Association), OLA (Organization for Latin Americans), DeBakey Music Club, the Filipino American club (Fil-Am), honor societies including chapters of the BETA club, The International Thespian Society, the National Honor Society, Chess Club, and the Hispanic Honor Society.

== Transportation ==
Houston ISD provides bus transportation to students who live more than two miles from DeBakey or students with major transportation obstacles. Many students choose to ride the bus, as many live more than eight to twenty miles away from the campus. The average time to reach the school by a school bus is one hour even for students who live relatively close to the school because some buses must make multiple stops; other students choose to carpool or drive themselves to school.

METRO routes that serve DeBakey High School include 10 (Willowbend), 2 (Bellaire), and 27 (Shepherd).

== Traditions ==
DeBakey's official mascot is the viper, and some important school traditions that it celebrates include:

- Scientific Symposium – A list of seminars being held at the school in which experienced professionals, mostly physicians and researchers, from the Houston area give information about their work.
- International Festival – A celebration emphasizing the cultures of the school, in which students dress up in their native culture and give cultural performances to the entire school.
- Talent Show – A talent show that the entire school attends.
- Rivalry with Carnegie - DeBakey High School traditionally has a rivalry with Carnegie Vanguard High School, especially in academics and sports.

== Feeder patterns ==
DeBakey has no feeder patterns since it is a magnet school, so no students are zoned to it. DeBakey accepts children from many Houston ISD middle schools.

Some students who are enrolled in private schools in the 8th grade choose to go to DeBakey for high school.

== UH-Baylor program ==
A unique program specifically for DeBakey graduates known as the UH-Baylor program allows up to 6 DeBakey students to be guaranteed admission to the Baylor College of Medicine after four years of classes at the University of Houston.

== See also ==
- Baylor College of Medicine Academy at Ryan
