= National Association for Biomedical Research =

American nonprofit organization

Coordinates: 38°54′10″N 77°2′39″W

The National Association for Biomedical Research (NABR) is an American nonprofit organization, 501(c)(6), located in Washington, DC. NABR was formed in 1985 when the Association of Biomedical Research merged with the National Society for Medical Research The NABR advocates for the continued use of animals in biomedical research albeit in as humane a manner as possible.

== About NABR ==
NABR reports to provide the unified voice for the scientific community on legislative and regulatory matters affecting laboratory animal research over its 30-year history. NABR has worked to ensure that biomedical research using animals remains possible, acting on behalf of approximately 300 public and private universities, medical and veterinary schools, teaching hospitals, voluntary health agencies, professional societies, pharmaceutical and biotech companies, and other animal research-related interests. These members are involved directly in the use of animals in biomedical research, committed to the responsible and humane use of these animals, and dependent upon innovations in medical research to advance the agenda of curing disease.

The association is the only national, nonprofit organization dedicated solely to advocating for a public policy that recognizes what has been described as the vital role that animals play in biomedical research. Its advocacy activities have included representing the views of its members to Congress through encouraging supportive legislation, providing comments on pending proposals, presenting testimony at Congressional hearings, and serving as an information source for Congressional staff and constituents.

The association has actively supported and promoted the humane care and treatment of laboratory animals in biomedical research, training, and education, and its members practice the “Three Rs” in these endeavors:

- that only as many animals as reasonably necessary be utilized (Reduce)
- that any pain or distress animals experience be minimized (Refine)
- that alternatives to the use of live animals be employed or developed wherever feasible (Replace)

The policy position by the biomedical research community that is represented by NABR, is that it is not now possible to completely replace the use of animals in biomedical research, and that the study of whole, living organisms is and will remain an indispensable element of biomedicine that is beneficial to both veterinary and human health. NABR's sister organization is the Foundation for Biomedical Research.

== History ==
In 1979, the proposed Health Research Modernization Act established a National Center for Alternative Research. The legislation would have mandated that 30-50 percent of federal dollars currently spent on animal research be diverted to study alternatives. This legislative initiative provided the impetus to establish an organization that would educate lawmakers about animal research. In 1979, the "Research Animal Alliance", a group of companies and individuals seeking to protect animal research, formed in Boston, MA and successfully guided legislation that would affect the future of biomedical research relying on animal models.

In 1981 the RAA changed its name to the Association for Biomedical Research (ABR). Greater than 80 percent of members responded the first time ABR mobilized its membership for comments to the United States Congress on the use of animals in research.

In 1981 ABR President Dr. Edward C. Melby testified before Congress on the important role of animals in medical research. saying that "the peer review system of the major granting agencies, including the NIH, the editorial review process for originality of thought by scientific journals and the cost-effectiveness of private industry prevent most so-called unnecessary animal experiments.” In September 1984, the ABR office relocated to Washington, D.C., in response to increasing congressional interest. In 1985, the ABR merged with the National Society for Medical Research to become the National Association for Biomedical Research (NABR). During debate on the 1985 reauthorization of the Farm bill, NABR successfully obtained modifications to the Animal Welfare Act amendments that aimed to provide a consistent and reasonable framework in which research facilities can operate.

In 1986, as an advocate of a strong national enforcement program of animal research facilities, the association joined with 100 scientific and animal welfare organizations to urge adequate funding for the U.S. Department of Agriculture’s Animal and Plant Health Inspection Service (APHIS).

The association lead a broad-based coalition to the passage of the Animal Enterprise Protection Act of 1992. NABR also helped defeat several policies, including the Information Dissemination and Research Accountability Act", that it considered would have put obstacles in the way of research.

During reauthorization of the 2002 Farm bill, the association was successful in obtaining a statutory exemption under the Animal Welfare Act of coverage of rats, mice and birds used for research. The association argued that these species are covered under other protective guidelines, policies and regulations.

In 2006, NABR was central in the effort that lead to the enactment of the Animal Enterprise Terrorism Act (AETA), which was signed into law on November 27, 2006, by President George W. Bush".

Since its inception, the association has represented the scientific community to policymakers. At times of increased animal activist campaigns against researchers by the animal rights movement, It worked to furnish legislators with facts from the biomedical research community, and educated them on the impact proposed changes would have on the progress of medical research. It led the biomedical community's participation in the legislative process, served as a resource for scientists targeted by the animal rights movement, and played a central role in assuring that federal laws met animal welfare and biomedical research needs.
