= American British Academy =

ABA Oman International School
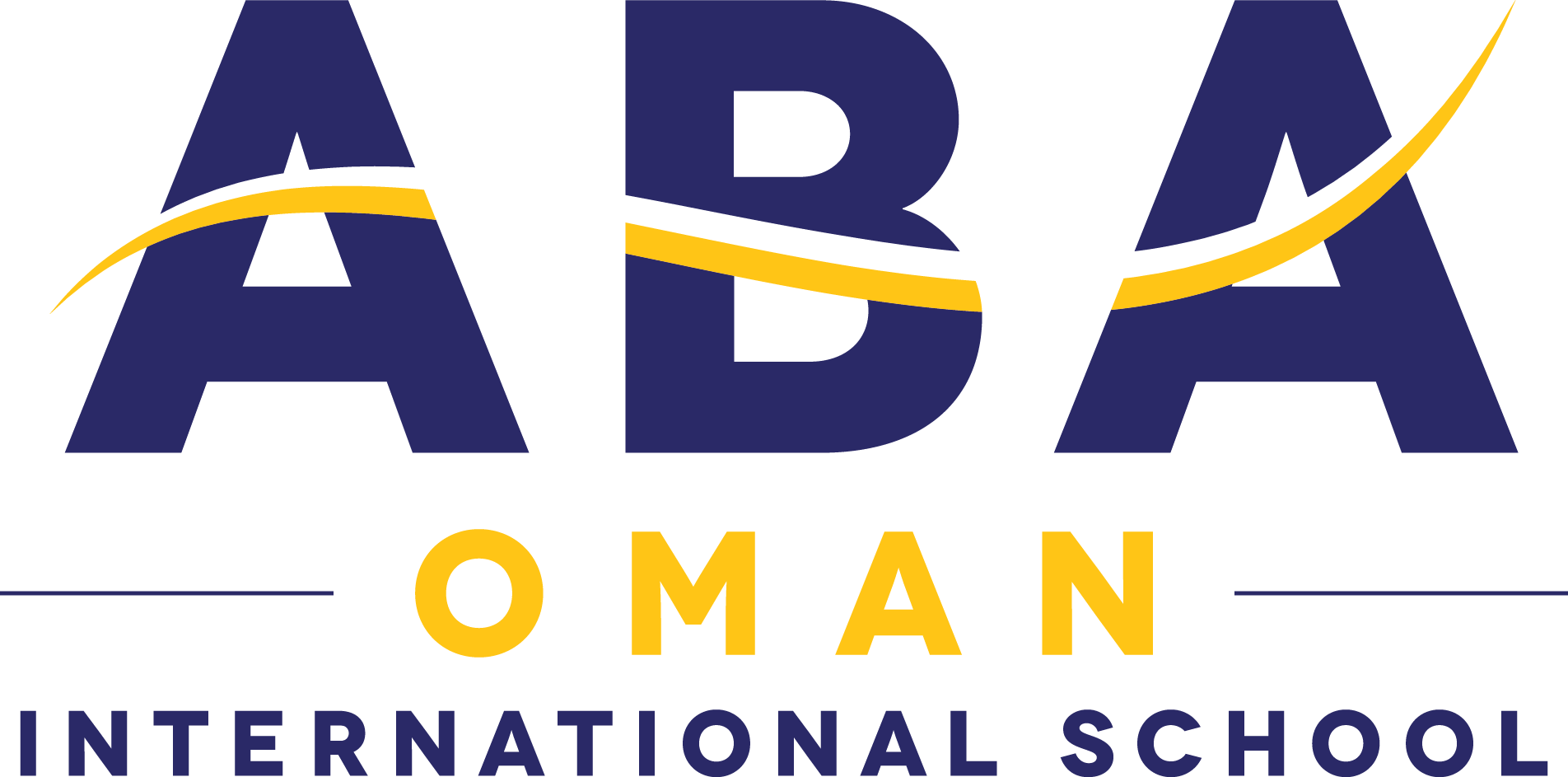

Location
- Muscat; Oman; 23°34′35.0832″N 58°18′20.2644″E

Information
- Type: Non-profit
- Opened: 1987
- School district: Muscat
- Head of school: Craig Williamson
- Grades: Pre K to Grade 12
- Enrollment: 940
- Campus size: Large
- Campus type: Modern
- Colors: Blue, white, gold
- Mascot: Viper
- Website: www.abaoman.org

The ABA Oman International School, earlier known as American British Academy is a private, non-profit, co-educational international school in Muscat, Oman established in September 1987. It offers a K-12 English-language curriculum to expatriate students. ABA is an International Baccalaureate World Continuum School, which enrolls 940 students from pre-kindergarten to grade 12 from more than 65 countries. ABA is the first school in the region to offer the IB programme — PYP, MYP and the IB DP.

== Notable alumni ==
- MyAnna Buring
