= Arcadia British School =

Coordinates: 25.0458°N 55.1826°E

- Dubai; United Arab Emirates

Information
- Type: School
- Motto: Nurturing Lifelong Learning Happiness First
- Established: August 2016
- Principal: Giles Pruett
- Website: arcadia.sch.ae

Arcadia British School is an educational institution in Jumeirah Village Triangle, Dubai, UAE, providing premium British education in the UAE. The school hosts the grades or year groups FS1 to Year 11. The Arcadia school curriculum aligns with the National Curriculum for England, which is for students from the Foundation Stage through A-Levels. The school has a KHDA rating of very good (2022–2023).

Mohan Valrani, director of the Al Shirawi Group founded the school and serves as chairman, with Giles Pruett, Executive Principal. Al Shirawi Group ranks as one of the largest privately owned industrial conglomerates in Dubai, United Arab Emirates.

== Founder ==
Mohan Valrani is an Indian industrialist. He is one of two co-founders, senior vice chairman and managing director of the Al Shirawi Group. He ranks 10th on the Forbes list of Top 100 Indian Leaders in the UAE.

He worked for his family's food business in Mumbai while pursuing his education and moved to Hong Kong after graduation, before relocating permanently to Dubai. In 1966 he began his partnership with the Emirati and present-day chairman Abdulla Al Shirawi.

He eventually formed the Al Shirawi Group in 1971, which ranks as one of the largest privately owned industrial conglomerates in Dubai, United Arab Emirates. The group has employment of 10,000 spread over 42 companies.

== Campus ==
Arcadia High School in Dubai's Jumeirah Village Triangle opened in 2016. The school hosts 1077 students, 98 teachers, 66 teaching assistants and 2 guidance counsellors. The school has two buildings separating the Primary and Secondary sections with teaching space, including classrooms, collaborative learning areas, and labs.

The primary classrooms are situated on the exterior of three sides of the building. The secondary school spans an area of 814,000 square feet.

The facilities include a library with various study areas, and an indoor sports hall. In the 2022–2023 academic year, the school received a "Very Good" rating from the Knowledge and Human Development Authority (KHDA).

== Curriculum ==
The school has British curriculum, with focus on reading, numeracy, and science. The curriculum incorporates foreign languages, information and communications technology (ICT).

== Awards ==
Award for Best New School in the UAE 2015–2021 by the Top Schools Awards 2021

== Accreditation and recognition ==
British Schools Overseas (BSO) Accredited. KHDA Rating: Very good, apple distinguished school
