= Michael DeBakey =

American surgeon and innovator (1908–2008)

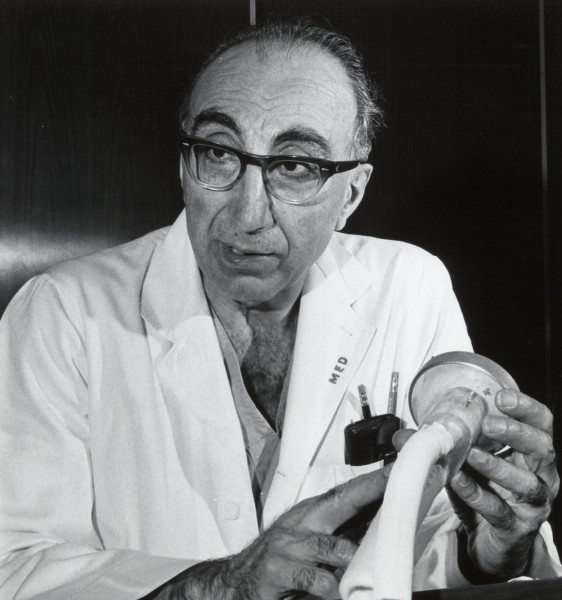
- Born: Michel Dabaghi; September 7, 1908; Lake Charles, Louisiana, U.S.
- Died: July 11, 2008 (aged 99); Houston, Texas, U.S.
- Education: Tulane University (BS, MD)
- Occupation: Cardiovascular surgeon
- Spouses: Diana Cooper (m. 1937; died 1972); Katrin Fehlhaber
- Children: 5
- Relatives: Lois DeBakey (sister); Selma DeBakey (sister)
- Medical career
- Profession: Surgeon
- Institutions: Tulane University
- Research: Vascular surgery; Cardiovascular surgery; Heart transplantation
- Awards: Presidential Medal of Freedom (1969); National Medal of Science (1987); Lomonosov Gold Medal (2003); Congressional Gold Medal (2008)

Michael Ellis DeBakey (September 7, 1908 – July 11, 2008) was an American Lebanese surgeon (general and cardiothoracic), scientist and medical educator who became Chairman of the Department of Surgery, President, and Chancellor of Baylor College of Medicine at the Texas Medical Center in Houston, Texas. His career spanned nearly eight decades.

Born to Lebanese immigrants, DeBakey was inspired to pursue a career in medicine by the physicians that he had met at his father's drug store, and he simultaneously learned sewing skills from his mother. He subsequently attended Tulane University for his premedical course and Tulane University School of Medicine to study medicine. At Tulane, he developed a version of the roller pump, which he initially used to transfuse blood directly from person to person and which later became a component of the heart–lung machine. Following early surgical training at Charity Hospital, DeBakey was encouraged to complete his surgical fellowships in Europe, before returning to Tulane University in 1937. During World War II, he worked in the Surgical Consultants Division of the Office of the Army Surgeon General, and later was involved in the establishment of the Veterans Administration.

DeBakey's surgical innovations included novel procedures to repair aortic aneurysms and dissections, the development of ventricular assist devices, and the introduction of prosthetic vascular substitutes. DeBakey received a number of awards, including the Albert Lasker Award, the Presidential Medal of Freedom, the National Medal of Science, and the Congressional Gold Medal. In addition, a number of institutions bear his name.

== Early life and education ==
Michael DeBakey was born Michel Dabaghi (Arabic: ميشيل دبغي) on September 7, 1908, in Lake Charles, Louisiana. His parents, Shiker and Raheeja Dabaghi (which was anglicized to DeBakey) were immigrants from Marjeyoun, Lebanon although they did not meet until both were living in the United States. Shiker, who had been a traveling salesman, settled in Lake Charles in the early 1900s and began to establish retail businesses, particularly general and drug stores. Both of them spoke French. Young Michael helped out with manual chores and keeping the books. DeBakey was the eldest of five children. His brother Ernest also became a physician, specializing in general and thoracic surgery. His sisters Lois and Selma were also scholarly, and eventually joined their eldest brother at Baylor College of Medicine as faculty members in medical communications. Another sister, Selena, died in 1952.

As a child, DeBakey learned to play the saxophone and was taught by his mother to sew, crochet, knit and tat. He could sew his own shirt by the age of 10. He also became intrigued with the Encyclopædia Britannica and is said by colleagues to have read it from beginning to end. He learned French and German and participated in a Boy Scout troop. He won awards for vegetables he had grown in his garden.

== Medical school ==
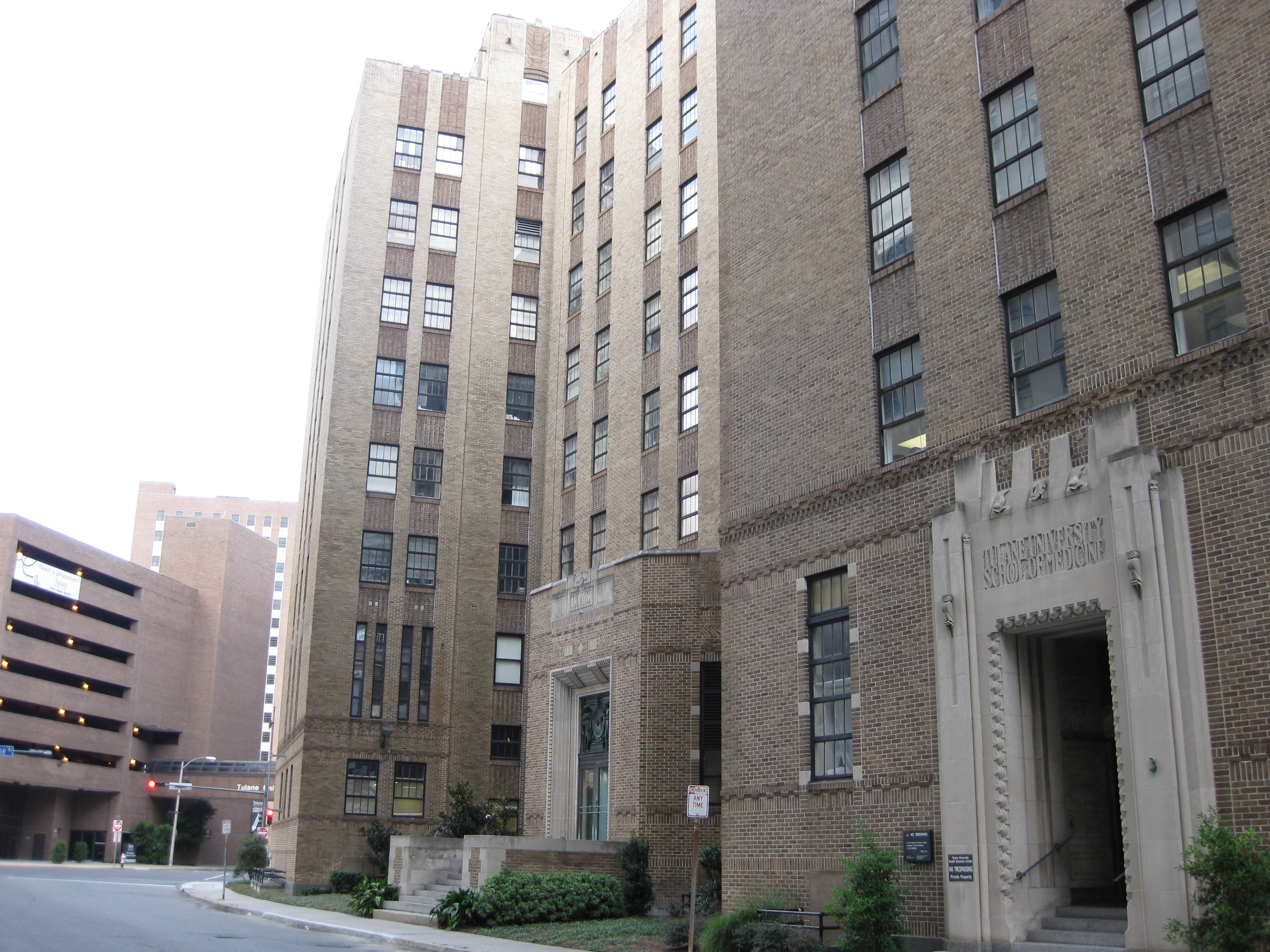
Tulane School of Medicine

DeBakey attended Tulane University, where he enrolled in a six-year program that combined undergraduate and medical school. He was awarded a Bachelor of Science degree in 1930 and a M.D. in 1932.

During his final year in medical school at Tulane University, and prior to the establishment of blood banks, DeBakey adapted old pumps and rubber tubing and developed a version of the roller pump. He used the pump to transfuse blood directly and continuously from person to person, and this later became a component of the heart–lung machine.

== Postgraduate surgical training ==
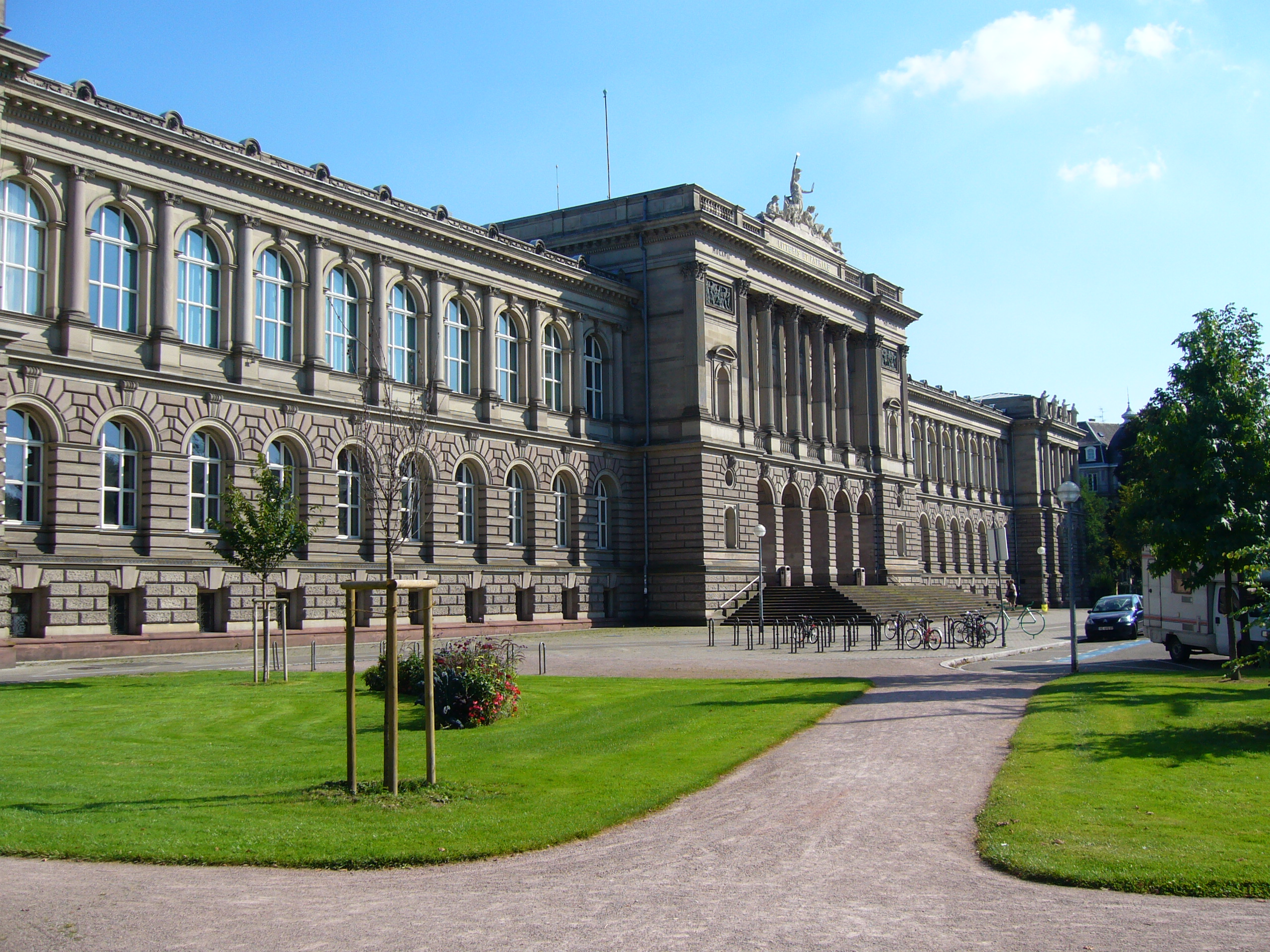
University of Strasbourg

Between 1933 and 1935, DeBakey remained in New Orleans to complete his internship and residency in surgery at Charity Hospital, and in 1935, he received a MS for his research on stomach ulcers. As was the trend for ambitious training surgeons at the time, and as his mentors Rudolph Matas and Alton Ochsner had done before him, DeBakey was encouraged to complete his surgical fellowships at the University of Strasbourg, France, under Professor René Leriche, and at the University of Heidelberg, Germany, under Professor Martin Kirschner.

Returning to Tulane Medical School, DeBakey served on the surgical faculty from 1937 to 1948.

With his mentor, Alton Ochsner, in 1939 DeBakey postulated a strong link between smoking and carcinoma of the lung, a hypothesis that other researchers supported as well.

== Second World War ==
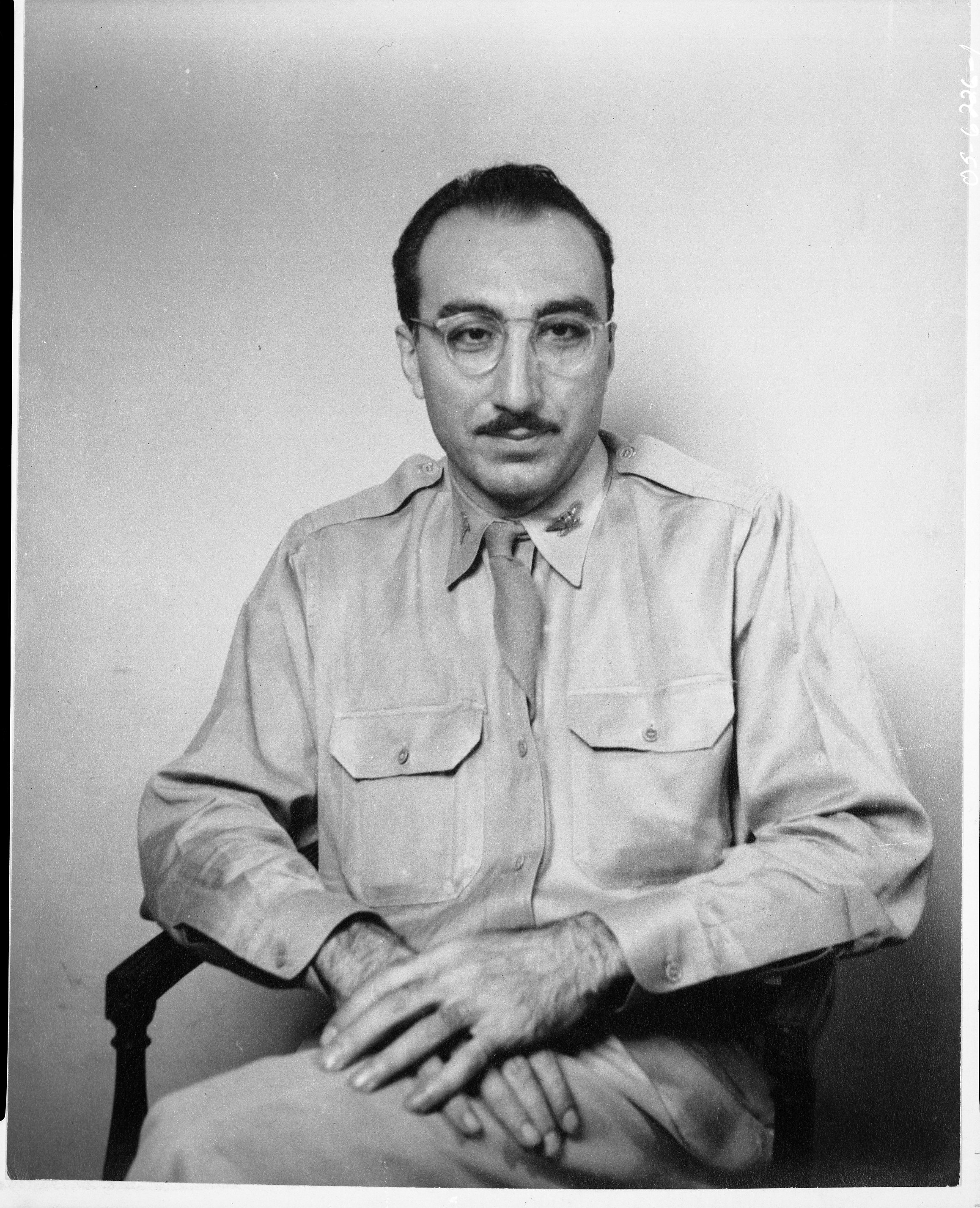
Colonel Michael DeBakey, Medical Corps, US Army, October 1945-February 1946

During the Second World War, DeBakey served in the US Army in the Surgical Consultants' Division in the Office of the Surgeon General of the Army. In 1945, he was given the Legion of Merit award.

Remaining in the U.S. Army for a year after the end of the war, he was instrumental in the ongoing care of wounded servicemen and helped establish the Veterans Administration and the Medical Follow-Up Agency. After the war, he returned to Tulane.

== Postwar surgical career ==
DeBakey joined the faculty of Baylor University College of Medicine (now known as the Baylor College of Medicine) in 1948, serving as chairman of the surgical department until 1993. DeBakey was president of the college from 1969 to 1979, and served as its chancellor from 1979 to January 1996, when he was named chancellor emeritus. He was Olga Keith Wiess and Distinguished Service Professor in the Michael E. DeBakey Department of Surgery at Baylor College of Medicine and director of the DeBakey Heart Center for research and public education at Baylor College of Medicine and Houston Methodist Hospital.

DeBakey was a member of the medical advisory committee of the Hoover Commission and was chairman of the President's Commission on Heart Disease, Cancer and Stroke during the Johnson Administration. He worked in numerous capacities to improve national and international standards of health care. Among his numerous consultative appointments, he served three terms on the National Heart, Lung, and Blood Advisory Council of the National Institutes of Health.

DeBakey hired surgeon Denton Cooley at Baylor College of Medicine in 1951. They collaborated until Cooley's resignation from his faculty position at the college in 1969.

=== Death of the Shah of Iran ===
In 1980 DeBakey was a consultant in the care of Mohammad Reza Pahlavi, the exiled Shah of Iran, who was in the terminal stages of lymphoma. Due to hypersplenism, the Shah underwent splenectomy in Cairo on March 28, 1980, with DeBakey supervising a team of surgeons. At operation, the Shah was found to be harboring widely metastatic disease. Several complications developed during the surgery such as an injury to the tail of the pancreas that led to complications in the postoperative period, including a subphrenic abscess and pneumonia. He died due to complications after surgery.

=== Vascular surgery ===
In the 1950s, DeBakey's observations and classification of atherosclerotic blood vessels permitted innovations in the treatments of vascular disease. His pursuit of the ideal material to make grafts led him to a department store that had run out of nylon, so he settled on polyethylene terephthalate (Dacron) and bought a yard of the material. Using his wife's sewing machine, DeBakey produced the first arterial Dacron grafts to replace or repair blood vessels. He subsequently collaborated with a research associate from the Philadelphia College of Textiles and Science to create a knitting machine for making grafts.

DeBakey performed the first successful carotid endarterectomy in 1953. A year later, he pioneered techniques in grafts for the various parts of the aorta.

DeBakey was among the earliest surgeons to perform coronary artery bypass surgery. A pioneer in the development of an artificial heart, he was among the first to use an external heart pump successfully in a patient – a left ventricular bypass pump.

In 1958, to counteract narrowing of an artery caused by an endarterectomy, DeBakey performed the first successful patch-graft angioplasty. This procedure involved patching the slit in the artery from an endarterectomy with a Dacron or vein graft. The patch widened the artery so that when it closed, the channel of the artery returned to normal size.

=== Film ===
In the 1960s, DeBakey and his team of surgeons performed some of the early instances of surgeries on film.

=== Views on animal research ===
DeBakey founded and chaired the Foundation for Biomedical Research (FBR), whose goal is to promote public understanding and support for animal research. DeBakey made wide use of animals in his research. He antagonized animal rights and animal welfare advocates who oppose the use of animals in the development of medical treatment for humans when he claimed that the "future of biomedical research; and ultimately human health" would be compromised if shelters stopped turning over surplus animals for medical research. Responding to the need for animal research, DeBakey stated that "These scientists, veterinarians, physicians, surgeons and others who do research in animal labs are as much concerned about the care of the animals as anyone can be. Their respect for the dignity of life and compassion for the sick and disabled, in fact, is what motivated them to search for ways of relieving the pain and suffering caused by diseases."

== Later surgical career ==
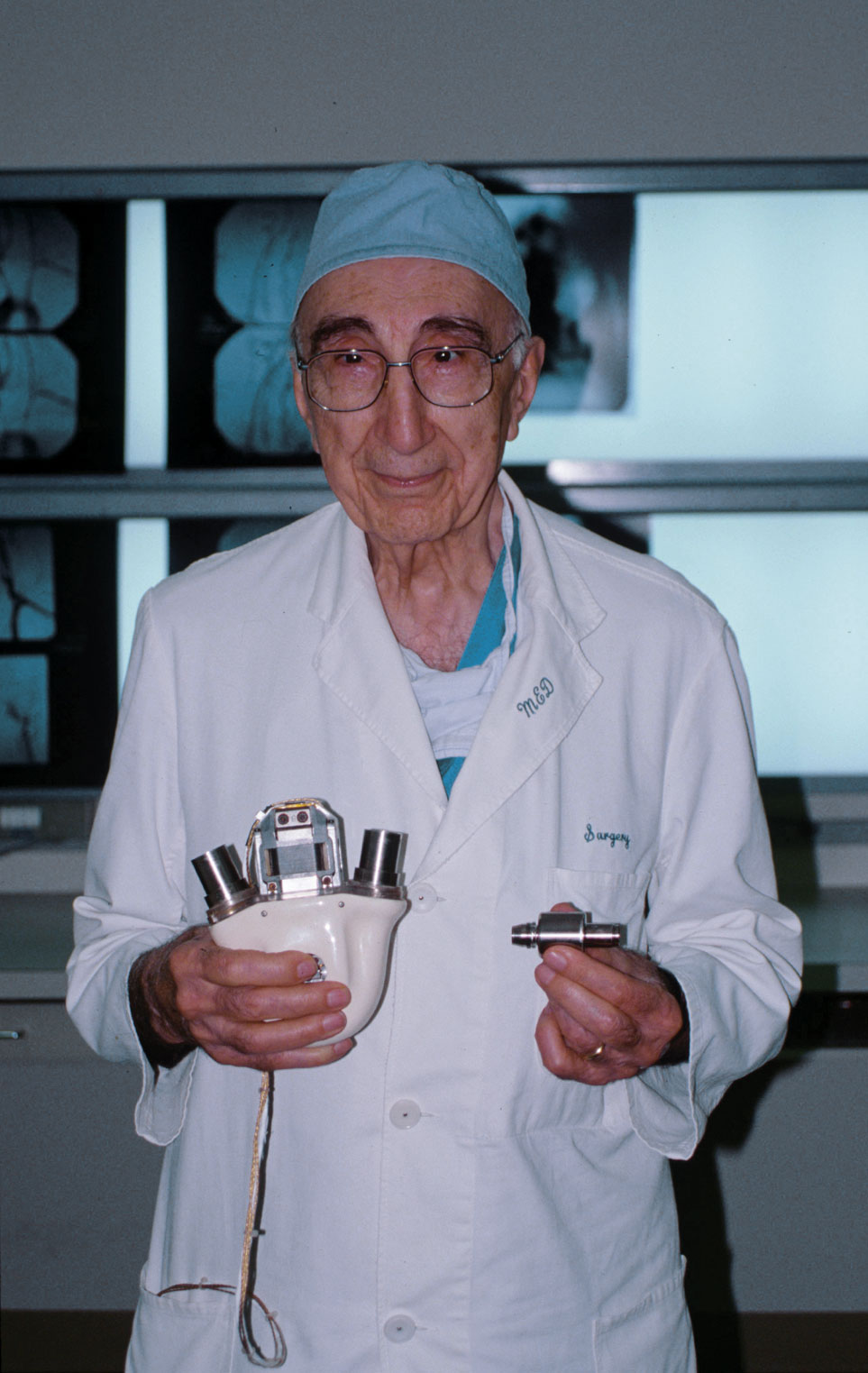
c. 2002

DeBakey continued to practice medicine until his death in 2008 at the age of 99. His contributions to the field of medicine spanned the better part of 75 years. DeBakey operated on more than 60,000 patients, including several heads of state. DeBakey and a team of American cardiothoracic surgeons, including George Noon, supervised quintuple-bypass surgery performed by Russian surgeons on Russian president Boris Yeltsin in 1996. On 29 April 1999, DeBakey oversaw an aorta-coronary bypass surgery of Azerbaijani president Heydar Aliyev in Cleveland, Ohio, during Aliyev's visit to the United States.

=== Health issues ===
In late 2005, DeBakey suffered an aortic dissection. Years earlier, DeBakey had pioneered the surgical treatment that now bears his name to treat this condition. A sharp chest pain sent him to Houston Methodist Hospital, where the diagnosis was confirmed by a CT scan. DeBakey initially resisted the surgical option, but as his health deteriorated and DeBakey became unresponsive, the surgical team opted to proceed with surgical intervention. In a controversial decision, Houston Methodist's ethics committee approved the operation; on February 9–10, 2006, DeBakey at age 97 became the oldest patient ever to undergo the surgery for which he was responsible. The operation by George Noon to repair his aorta with a Dacron graft, similar to one he had pioneered decades earlier, lasted seven hours. After a complicated post-operative course that required eight months in the hospital at a cost of over one million dollars, DeBakey was released in September 2006 and returned to good health.

== Selected honors and awards ==
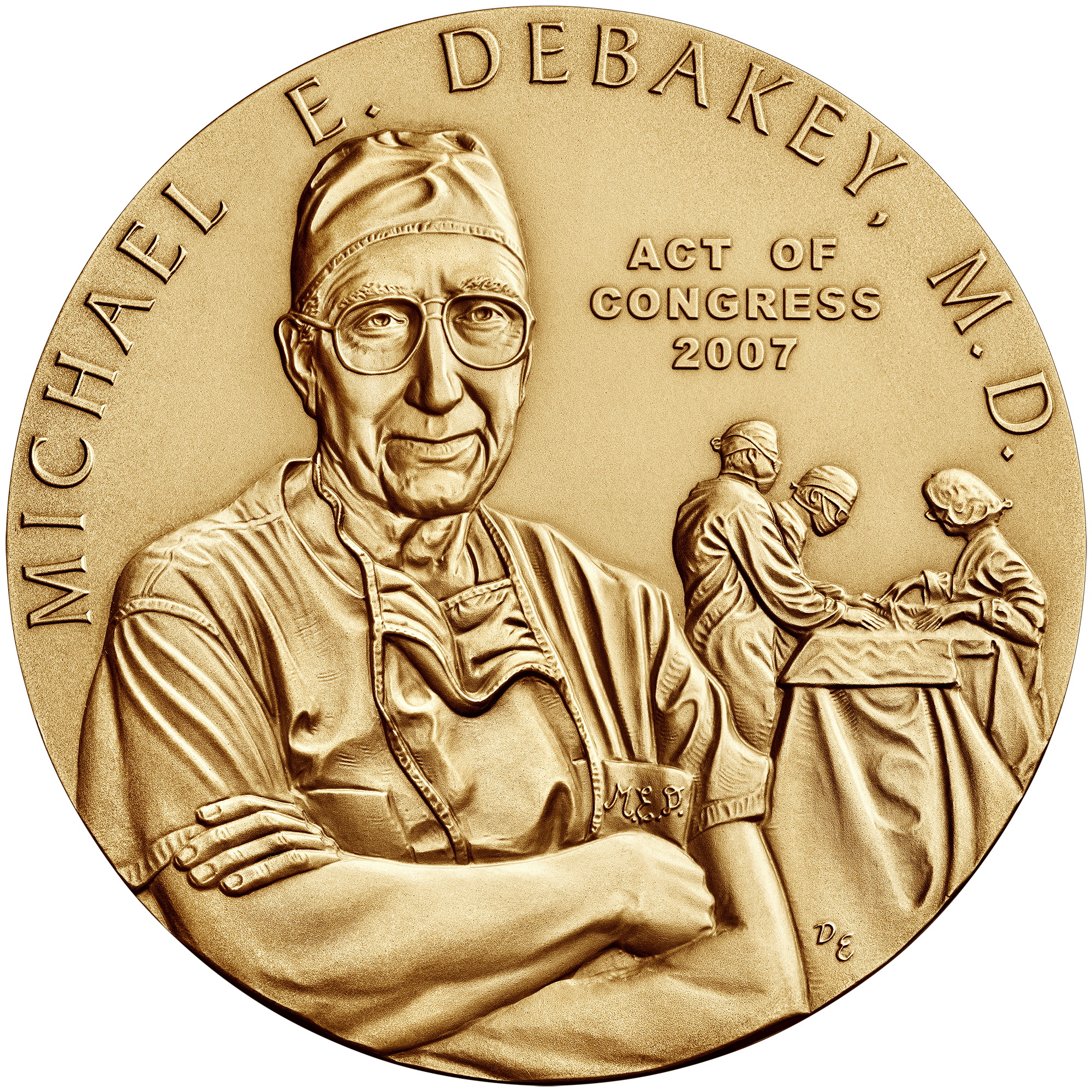
The Congressional Gold Medal awarded to DeBakey

DeBakey became a member of numerous learned societies, gained 36 honorary degrees and was the recipient of hundreds of awards.

He received the Presidential Medal of Freedom in 1969. In 1987, President Ronald Reagan awarded him the National Medal of Science. He was a Health Care Hall of Famer, a Lasker Luminary and a recipient of the United Nations Lifetime Achievement Award and the Presidential Medal of Freedom with Distinction. He was given the Lifetime Achievement Award of the Foundation for Biomedical Research and in 2000 was cited as a "Living Legend" by the Library of Congress. On April 23, 2008, he received the Congressional Gold Medal from President George W. Bush, Speaker of the House Nancy Pelosi and Senate Majority Leader Harry Reid. DeBakey's major awards include:

- US Army Legion of Merit (1945)
- American Medical Association Hektoen Gold Medal (1954 and 1970)
- Rudolph Matas Award in Vascular Surgery (1954)
- International Society of Surgery Distinguished Service Award (1958)
- René Leriche Prize from the International Surgical Society (1959)
- American Medical Association Distinguished Service Award (1959)
- Albert Lasker Award for Clinical Medical Research (1963)
- American Academy of Achievement's Golden Plate Award (1967)
- Prix International Dag Hammarskjold Great Collar with Golden Medal (1967)
- American Heart Association Gold Heart Award (1968)
- Medal of Freedom with Distinction (1969)
- Eleanor Roosevelt Humanitarian Award (1969)
- Yugoslavian Presidential Banner and Sash (1971)
- Union of Soviet Socialist Republics Academy of Sciences 50th Anniversary Jubilee Medal (1973)
- Independence of Jordan Medal (1980)
- American Surgical Association Distinguished Service Award (1981)
- National Medal of Science (1987)
- Merit Order of the Republic of Egypt (1980)
- International Society of Surgery Distinguished Service Award (1981)
- National Medal of Science (1987)
- Theodore E. Cummings Memorial Prize for Outstanding Contributions in Cardiovascular Disease (1987)
- International Platform Association George Crile Award as the Trailblazer in Open Heart Surgery (1988)
- Thomas Alva Edison Foundation Award (1988)

Others awards include:

- Honorary Doctorate of Science from Universidad Francisco Marroquín (1989)
- Special Award for Space Technology Utilization (1997)
- MUSC Lindbergh-Carrel Prize (2002)
- Lomonosov Large Gold Medal, Russian Academy of Sciences (2003)
- The Denton A. Cooley Leadership Award (January 21, 2009)

== Personal life and family ==
DeBakey married Diana Cooper after returning from Europe in 1937, and they had four sons: Michael, Denis, Ernest and Barry. After Diana died in 1972, he married German actress Katrin Fehlhaber, with whom he had a daughter, Olga-Katarina.

DeBakey has been described as a "tough taskmaster" by colleagues and trainees. Former trainee Jeremy R. Morton described how “he could be sweet as dripping honey when it came to patients and medical students, but could be brutal with surgical residents."

== Death and legacy ==
DeBakey died from natural causes at Houston Methodist Hospital on July 11, 2008, at the age of 99. After lying in repose in Houston's City Hall, the first ever to do so, DeBakey received a memorial service at the Co-Cathedral of the Sacred Heart on July 16, 2008. He was granted ground burial at Arlington National Cemetery by the Secretary of the Army. On January 21, 2009, DeBakey became the first posthumous recipient of the Denton A. Cooley Leadership Award.

=== Michael E. DeBakey International Surgical Society ===
In 1976, DeBakey's trainees students founded the Michael E. DeBakey International Cardiovascular Surgical Society, which later changed its name to the Michael E. DeBakey International Surgical Society. Every two years, the Michael E. DeBakey Surgical Award is given.

=== Lasker-DeBakey Clinical Medical Research Award ===
The Albert Lasker Award for Clinical Medical Research, given by the Lasker Foundation since 1946, was renamed the Lasker-DeBakey Clinical Medical Research Award in DeBakey's honor in 2008.

=== Michael E. DeBakey Library and Museum ===
In early 2008, DeBakey attended the groundbreaking for the new Michael E. DeBakey Library and Museum at Baylor College of Medicine in Houston, which honors his life, work and dedication to care and teaching. The museum officially opened on Friday, May 14, 2010.

=== DeBakey Medical Foundation ===
In honor of DeBakey, the DeBakey Medical Foundation, in conjunction with Baylor College of Medicine, annually selects recipients of the Michael E. DeBakey, M.D., Excellence in Research Awards. The awards recognize faculty who have published outstanding scientific research contributions to clinical or basic biomedical research. The awards are funded by the DeBakey Medical Foundation and have funded researchers from the Center for Cell and Gene Therapy at Texas Children's Cancer Center.

The foundation helped to establish the Michael E. DeBakey, Selma DeBakey and Lois DeBakey Endowed Scholarship Fund in Medical Humanities at Baylor University. The scholarship designates award recipients as "DeBakey Scholars" in recognition of the legacy of the DeBakey family.

=== Other DeBakey institutes ===
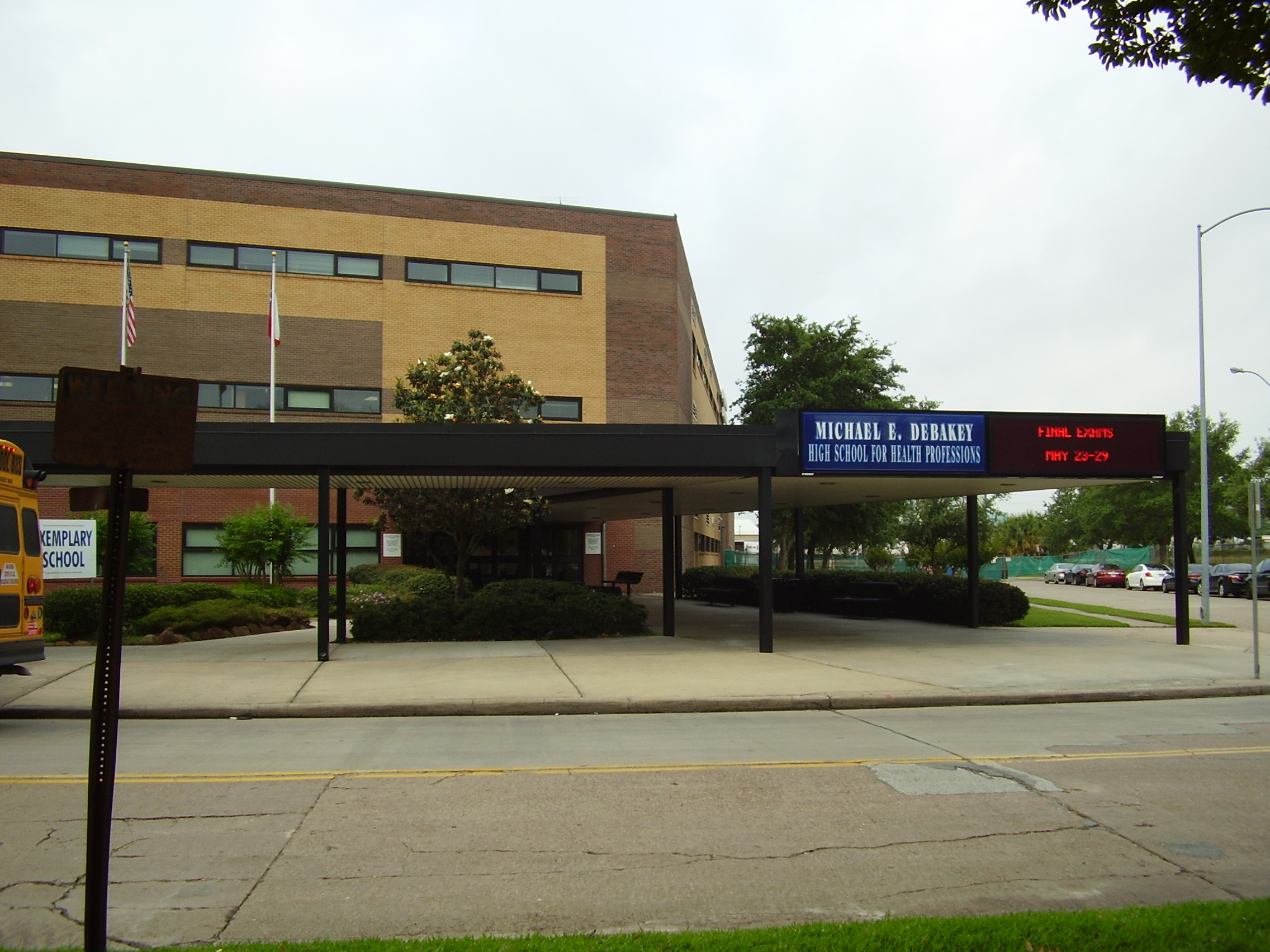
DeBakey High School for Health Professions

The DeBakey High School for Health Professions, Houston Methodist DeBakey Heart & Vascular Center, and the Michael E. DeBakey Veterans Affairs Medical Center in Houston at the Texas Medical Center in Houston are named after DeBakey. He had a role in establishing the Michael E. DeBakey Heart Institute at the Hays Medical Center in Kansas. Several atraumatic vascular surgical clamps and forceps that DeBakey introduced also bear his name. The Michael E. DeBakey Institute at Texas A&M College of Veterinary Medicine & Biomedical Sciences, founded as a collaboration between Texas A&M, the Baylor College of Medicine and the UT Health Science Center at Houston for cardiovascular research, was named after DeBakey.

== Selected publications ==
DeBakey's writings are reflected in his authorship or co-authorship in more than 1,300 published medical articles, chapters, and books on various aspects of surgery, medicine, health, medical research, and medical education, as well as ethical, socio-economic and philosophic discussion in those fields. In addition to his scholarly writings, DeBakey co-authored popular works including The Living Heart, The Living Heart Shopper's Guide and The Living Heart Guide to Eating Out. His publications include:

- "A Simple Continuous Flow Blood Transfusion Instrument", New Orleans Medical and Surgical Journal (1934)
- Cold Injury, Ground Type; Whayne, Tom F.; Michael E. DeBakey; and John Boyd Coates. Medical Department, United States Army in World War II. Washington, D.C.: Office of the Surgeon General, 1958.
- The living heart. Co-authored with Antonio M Gotto and Mediziner Italien, Charter Books (1977), ISBN 9780441485505
- The Living heart diet, New York: Raven Press (1984), ISBN 9780890046722
- New living heart. Co-authored with Antonio M Gotto, Holbrook (1997), ISBN 9781558507227
- The Living Heart in the 21st Century. Co-authored with Antonio Gotto and George P. Noon, Prometheus (2012), ISBN 9781616145644

DeBakey worked on his first book with Gilbert Wheeler Beebe after World War II:

- Battle Casualties Incidence, Mortality, and Logistic Considerations, co-authored with G. W. Beebe, Springfield, Ill. : Charles C. Thomas (1952)
