= Dubai American Academy =

Private international school in Dubai, UAE

GEMS Dubai American Academy

Location
- Al Barsha, Dubai; United Arab Emirates; 25.1142°N 55.2075°E

Information
- Type: Private international school
- Established: 1998
- Superintendent: Helen Pereira-Raso
- Principal: Ashley Szar (high school)
- Principal: Justin Reynolds (middle school)
- Principal: Mike Gilmore (elementary school)
- Campus Director: Benjamin Tung
- Faculty: 235+
- Enrollment: c. 3,000
- Colors: Blue, red, and navy
- Mascot: Diego the Leopard
- Rival: American School of Dubai
- Accreditation: New England Association of Schools and Colleges (NEASC); Council of International Schools (CIS); International Baccalaureate Organization (IBO)
- Website: www.gemsaa-dubai.com

GEMS Dubai American Academy (DAA) is a private international school located in Al Barsha, Dubai, United Arab Emirates. It is operated by GEMS Education and offers an American curriculum along with Advanced Placement and International Baccalaureate programs. Since 2011, it has been consistently rated “Outstanding” by the Knowledge and Human Development Authority (KHDA).

== History ==
Founded in 1998, the school initially operated from a smaller campus before relocating in 2017 following its merger with GEMS Nations Academy. The relocation to a purpose-built 70,000 m² facility in Al Barsha South marked a significant expansion.

== Accreditation and curriculum ==
DAA is accredited by the NEASC, CIS, and authorized by the IBO. Its curriculum is aligned with the Common Core and includes:

- Early Years Foundation Stage (EYFS)
- American curriculum (Grades 1–10)
- International Baccalaureate Diploma Programme (Grades 11–12)
- Advanced Placement (AP) courses

== Campus ==
The Al Barsha South campus includes:

- Olympic-size and training pools
- 400-meter athletics track and FIFA-standard pitch
- Indoor gyms, shaded playgrounds
- 600-seat performing arts theatre
- Arts, dance, music studios
- Science labs, innovation hubs, and maker spaces
- Cafeterias and central library

The facility emphasizes flexible learning spaces and environmental sustainability.

== Academic performance ==
DAA students perform above global averages in IB exams, with a recent average score of 35.4, compared to the global average of ~30.

== Extracurricular activities ==
DAA offers extensive programs in:

- Sports (DISA and ESSF leagues)
- Performing and visual arts
- Academic clubs (MUN, robotics, debate, coding)

== Notable alumni ==
- Andrew de Burgh - Actor, director, writer, film producer
- Dina Shihabi – Actress known for Jack Ryan and Altered Carbon.
- Johnny Boufarhat – Founder and former CEO of Hopin.
- Alia Al Mansoori – Emirati student scientist whose project was sent to the International Space Station.
- Omar Al Busaidy – Emirati entrepreneur and author.
- Keyaan Nanjwani – Canadian entrepreneur and visionary.

== Awards and recognition ==
- Rated “Outstanding” by KHDA (multiple years)
- Recognized as an Apple Distinguished School for technology integration
- Recognized by MEED Project Awards (2019) as the UAE's first thermal energy storage school, recipient of Education Project of the Year and GCC Best Innovation category.

== See also ==
- GEMS Education
- American School of Dubai
- International Baccalaureate
