= American School of Dubai =

Coordinates: 25°13′6″N 55°15′35″E

The American School of Dubai
- Dubai; United Arab Emirates

Information
- Type: Non-profit, private
- Motto: Every Student. Future Ready.
- Established: 1966
- Locale: Dubai, United Arab Emirates
- Superintendent: Jennifer Sparrow
- Faculty: 300
- Enrollment: 2000
- Colors: red and white
- Athletics: Volleyball, Basketball, Soccer, Badminton, Track and Field, Cross Country, Swimming, Softball, Baseball, Golf, Cheerleading, Wrestling, Tennis, and additional competition in Academic Games, and Speech and Debate. Other intramural sports are also present.
- Mascot: Falcon
- Website: www.asdubai.org

The American School of Dubai (ASD) is an independent, not-for-profit, U.S. curriculum, Early Learning through Grade 12 international school offering an American education. The school was founded in 1966 and was previously known as the Jumeirah American School (JAS), is now located in the Al-Barsha community of Dubai, United Arab Emirates.

In 2018-2019 ASD won awards for sustainability efforts. Most notably the Zayed Sustainability Prize (ZPS), Global High School Category (MENA Region) Award 2019 and 2020 Expo, 2018 Sustainability Champions Competition. Additional awards include Knowledge Review Magazine's, 10 Best International Schools in Dubai 2019; Winner of the SchoolsCompared.com, Best American Curriculum School of the Year 2019.

Around 2008, the school was reviewed by the Good Schools Guide International as "One of the best thought-of and long established schools in Dubai". It was also rated by UAE based schools review web site, WhichSchoolAdvisor.com as one of the best schools in Dubai in 2012.

The Knowledge and Human Development Authority (KHDA) rated the school as "Good" for the academic years 2008 through to the 2019 report.

== Academics ==
ASD offers a variety of courses, including Advanced Placement classes, offering the most AP classes in the Emirate of Dubai. It currently offers:

- AP 2-D Art and Design
- AP 3-D Art and Design
- AP Biology
- AP Calculus AB
- AP Calculus BC
- AP Chemistry
- AP Computer Science A
- AP Computer Science Principles
- AP Drawing
- AP English Language
- AP English Literature
- AP European History
- AP French Language and Culture
- AP Human Geography
- AP Macroeconomics
- AP Microeconomics
- AP Physics 2
- AP Physics C: Electricity and Magnetism
- AP Physics C: Mechanics
- AP Precalculus
- AP Psychology
- AP Research
- AP Seminar
- AP Spanish Language and Culture
- AP Spanish Literature and Culture
- AP Statistics
- AP United States History
- AP World History

== Demographics ==
As of 2022, there are about 2,010 students. Suburbs housing ASD students include: Al Barsha, Arabian Ranches, Dubai Marina, Jebel Ali, Jumeirah, Meadows, Motor City, Palm Jumeirah, and Umm Suqeim. In addition some ASD students live in Sharjah. 82 countries were represented in the student body.

== See also ==
- Dubai American Academy
- Dubai International Academy
- Dubai International School
- Arcadia British School
