= Campaign against Highgate Rabbit Farm =

British animal rights campaign

The campaign against Highgate Rabbit Farm, also known as the Close Highgate Farm campaign, is a series of direct actions by anti-vivisection activists. Highgate Rabbit Farm in Market Rasen, Lincolnshire in England is licensed by the Home Office to breed rabbits and ferrets for animal-testing facilities, including Huntingdon Life Sciences. Actions have included a raid by the Animal Liberation Front (ALF) and an arson claimed by the Militant Forces Against HLS. The ALF raid in 2008 saw 129 rabbits removed and £100,000-worth of damage to property. The campaign has been linked to activists involved in Stop Huntingdon Animal Cruelty (SHAC).

== Background ==
Highgate Farm, based in the village of Normanby by Spital, Market Rasen, is one of a number of animal-testing facilities in the UK that have been targeted, and in several cases closed, by anti-vivisection campaigners since 1997.

Consort Kennels, which bred beagles for animal research, was closed that year after a ten-month campaign. Shortly afterwards, Save the Hill Grove Cats—run by the same group of campaigners—was set up in opposition to Hill Grove farm in Oxfordshire, which bred cats for laboratories, successfully closing the farm in 1999. The Hill Grove campaign then set up Stop Huntingdon Animal Cruelty to close Huntingdon Life Sciences, a contract animal-testing facility, a controversial campaign that continues. In parallel, Shamrock Farm in Sussex, Britain's only non-human primate importation and quarantine centre, was targeted; it closed in 2000 after a 15-month campaign by "Save the Shamrock Monkeys," and an investigation by the British Union for the Abolition of Vivisection. Regal Rabbits in Surrey, which bred rabbits for animal laboratories, closed in 2000, and Save the Newchurch Guinea Pigs was set up in Staffordshire against Darley Oaks Farm, which supplied guinea pigs for animal research, ending in May 2006 after a controversial grave desecration claimed by the Animal Rights Militia.

== Incidents ==
On 6 January 2008, the Animal Liberation Front raided Highgate farm and removed 129 rabbits. A quad bike, lawnmower, van and a sports car were also reported to have been paint stripped and glued, causing £100,000 worth of damage. The ALF said they carried out the raid to stop the rabbits being sold to laboratories such as Huntingdon Life Sciences and other universities in the UK. Following the raid, in April 2009, the farm installed a £60,000 security system to deter potential intruders.

On 27 July 2009, half a dozen SHAC activists set up at protest camp for a few days 100 yards from the farm. In September that year, as part of a Global Week of Action Against Laboratory Animal Breeders, 400 campaigners from SHAC gathered outside the farm. Over 100 police officers were deployed from over five forces, although the day passed peacefully with no arrests. The protest was hailed by campaigners as a success, bringing the farm to local attention.

On 19 July 2010 a Mercedes-Benz Sprinter van left at the farm was set on fire, destroying the vehicle. Eight rabbits inside the van died during the attack. Two men were later arrested on suspicion of arson and blackmail. A group called the Militant Forces Against HLS said they had gathered information to use against the farm in the future. In response, the owner, Geoff Douglas, said he runs a legitimate business, that most of the animals go to test vaccines for both humans and animals, and he believes he is saving tens of thousands of lives.

On 5 July 2011, members of the "Provisional RSPCA" went to Highgate Farm, broke into the conservatory and set fire to the inside of the owner home, using a incendiary device setting fire in the building and a transport van in other part of the farm. The group claimed the attack in a statement published in BiteBack website.

== Court cases ==
In July 2008, a 22-year-old man, Lewis Pogson, was arrested in Worthing as part of an investigation into the ALF raid, which included searching the Friend Animal Sanctuary at East Peckham, near Paddock Wood, Kent. He pleaded not guilty but was later found guilty of taking part in the raid and awaits sentencing. Pogson subsequently published an account of his experiences.

In October four more activists were arrested and accused of conspiracy to cause damage at Highgate Farm, including further charges of interfering with a contractual relationship so as to harm an animal research establishment and conspiracy. None of those accused were connected to the earlier ALF raid, but had links with SHAC. The prosecution claimed the activists were carrying out a “reconnaissance” to plan further criminal damage, designed to interfere with HLS' contract with the farm.

== See also ==
- List of animal rights groups
