= Camp Beagle =

Animal rights protest camp in England

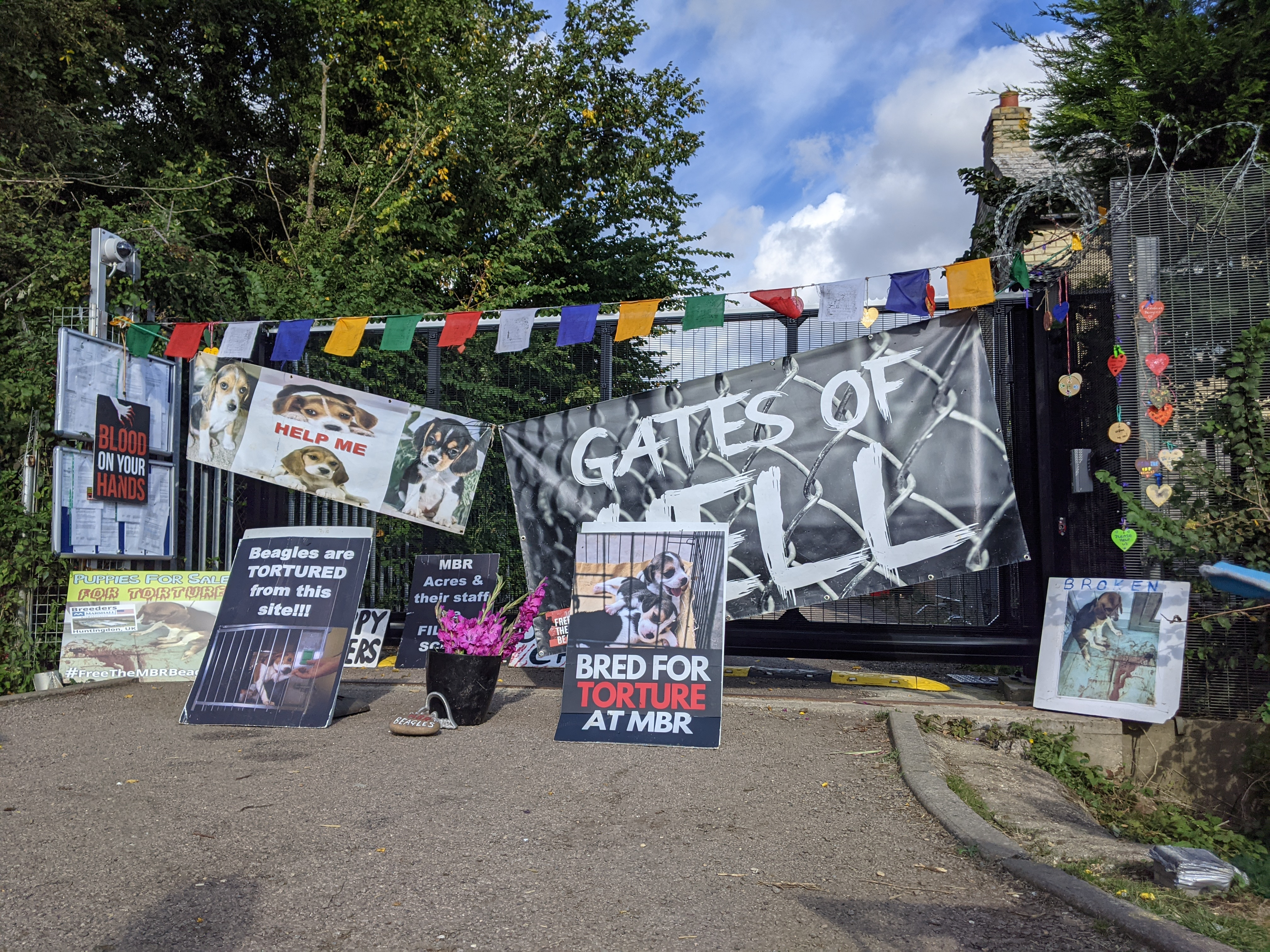
- Front gates of MBR Acres, covered in protester signs
- Date: June 2021 – present
- Location: MBR Acres, Wyton, Cambridgeshire, England; 52.3611334°N 0.1382937°W
- Caused by: Animal rights activists opposing the breeding of beagles for research
- Goals: Closure of the facility and end of the use of beagles in research
- Methods: Protest camp, civil disobedience
- Status: Ongoing

Casualties
- Arrested: At least 15

Camp Beagle is an ongoing protest camp set up in June 2021 by animal rights activists outside of MBR Acres, a Marshall BioResources breeding facility for beagles used in laboratory research, in Wyton, Cambridgeshire. As of May 2024, It is the longest-lasting protest camp of its kind, where protesters have maintained a permanent presence with the demand to shutdown the facility and end the use of beagles for research purposes.

== Background ==
MBR Acres is owned by the American company Marshall BioResources (MBR). It is a breeding facility for beagles used in laboratory research, in Wyton, Cambridgeshire. Up to 2,000 beagles are bred at the facility each year. They are sold at the age of around 16 weeks to be used for drugs and chemical testing. Since 2020, protests have been held around the facility by animal rights activists. The protest camp was set up in June 2021 by animal rights activists outside of MBR Acres. As of May 2024, It is the longest-lasting protest camp of its kind, where protesters have maintained a permanent presence with the demand to shutdown the facility and end the use of beagles for research purposes.

== History ==
=== 2021 ===
The camp was first set up in June 2021. Footage of dogs from the facility published by the Daily Mirror led to increased support of the campaign. The protesters argue that the facility is factory farming beagles. MBR issued a statement saying that the protesters are misinformed and that breeding of animals is essential for medical research. The statement also stated that the facility is both regulated and frequently inspected by the Home Office which enforces strict laws around animal welfare in research facilities.

Actors Ricky Gervais and Peter Egan have voiced their support for the facility to be closed down. In August, The Times published a letter signed by in support of MBR Acres and its contribution to medical research to nineteen scientific societies and organizations.

On 28 August, Camp Beagle coordinated a protest with Animal Rebellion at Smithfield Market in London. 15 activists were arrested on 31 August for "suspected obstruction of the highway or of criminal damage." Following a High Court injunction hearing instigated by MBR Acres, it was ruled, on 5 October, that the camp was allowed to remain, with the provision that activists must remain at least 10 metres from the gates.

In October, a Freedom of Information Request revealed that Cambridgeshire Constabulary spent £165,166 from 27 June to 14 September 2021 on policing the camp. According to protesters, "more than 40 officers and 10 police vans" were used during a day of transportation in October. The following month, the singer Will Young handcuffed himself to the gates of the facility, describing the facility as a "puppy farm".

=== 2022 ===
In December 2022, activists from Animal Rebellion freed 18 beagles from the facility. Two beagles known as Libby and Love – that were recovered by police – were later returned to the facility, and 14 people were arrested as part of an investigation into burglary and aggravated trespass at the site.

=== 2023 ===
In July 2023, nine campaigners were found guilty of aggravated trespass, and were given conditional discharges or fines. The Crown Prosecution Service otherwise dropped charges of burglary against 12 people, stating that "the legal test for going ahead [with the criminal prosecutions] had not been met".

=== 2024 ===
On 25 May 2024, an estimated 400–500 protesters descended upon the camp, as part of a protest billed as "Operation 1,000", in an attempt to attract 1,000 protesters to the camp. Cambridgeshire Police closed the nearby road due to the number of demonstrators in attendance.

=== 2025 ===
In February 2025, restrictions on one of the protesters - a long-standing anti vivisection campaigner and long-term semi-permanent resident of the camp - were lifted in a high court ruling. He welcomed the result of this hearing but repeated his determination to see MBR Acres close.

=== 2026 ===
Camp Beagle and Animal Rising activists decried the Labour government's January 2026 change in rules over protests and its likely effect on the camp. In February 2026, two protesters were arrested outside the facility. They were bailed until May. In March 2026, there were renewed calls for the closure of the facility.

== See also ==
- Brown Dog affair
- Consort beagles campaign
- Save the Hill Grove Cats
- Save the Newchurch Guinea Pigs
- Shamrock Farm
- Stop Huntingdon Animal Cruelty
