= Heather Nicholson =

British animal rights activist

- Known for: Consort beagles campaign Save the Hill Grove Cats; Stop Huntingdon Animal Cruelty

Heather Nicholson is a British animal rights activist.

Nicholson set up Stop Huntingdon Animal Cruelty (SHAC) to close Huntingdon Life Sciences, a contract animal-testing company. That campaign was unsuccessful and closed in 2014.

In 2009 Nicholson was sentenced to 11 years imprisonment for conspiracy to blackmail in connection with the SHAC campaign. Six other senior SHAC activists, including Avery and Dellemagne, were jailed for the same offences. All were alleged by police to be key figures within the Animal Liberation Front.

== Activism ==
=== Consort, Hill Grove ===
Nicholson became involved in the animal rights movement when she was 26, after attending a demonstration at Swansea airport to protest against live animal exports. During a similar demonstration at Coventry airport, she met her husband, Greg Avery, also an animal rights activist. She joined Avery to found Consort beagles, a campaign against Consort, a company in Ross-on-Wye that bred beagles for laboratories, which closed 10 months later. Nicholson and Avery co-founded a subsequent campaign, Save the Hill Grove Cats, which saw the closure two years later of Hill Grove Farm near Oxford, which bred laboratory cats.

=== SHAC ===
Nicholson and Avery set up SHAC in 1999, along with Natasha Dellemagne, to close Huntingdon Life Sciences (HLS). The company was saved when the British government provided it with banking facilities, after the UK's major banks severed ties with it as a result of the campaign. HLS is Europe's largest contract animal-testing company, testing everything from pesticides to drugs, on behalf of commercial clients, on around 75,000 animals a year, including rats, rabbits, pigs, dogs, and primates. HLS was the subject of an undercover investigation by the British Union for the Abolition of Vivisection in 1989, which alleged that workers routinely mishandled the animals. Nicholson, Avery, and Dellemagne set up SHAC in November 1999, after People for the Ethical Treatment of Animals obtained undercover footage showed HLS staff punching and shaking beagles in the company's laboratory in Cambridge, England.

The SHAC campaign targeted anyone who worked for or did business with HLS. This could entail protesters standing outside homes, blowing whistles and letting off fireworks throughout the night, spraying graffiti on property, breaking windows, spreading rumours to neighbours that the target was a paedophile, and sending hoax bombs and obscene mail. Threats of violence were signed on behalf of the Animal Liberation Front or Animal Rights Militia. The police and courts regarded the SHAC campaign as an example of "urban terrorism". Nicholson described it as "a straightforward battle between good and evil, mercy and money, compassion and cruelty."

Nicholson and Avery divorced in or around 2002, but continued to live and work together. In 2002 Avery married Natasha Dellemagne and the three of them lived for a time together in a rent-free cottage in Woking, Surrey. The cottage was owned by Virginia Jane Steele, also known as Alexander, a wealthy supporter of the animal rights movement.

== Injunctions, convictions ==
Nicholson said she had received 50 injunctions in connection with her activism. In 2005 she was given a five-year Anti-Social Behaviour Order (ASBO) instructing her to stay away from animal research laboratories or anyone associated with HLS. In 2006 she was jailed for affray for assaulting a family, including a 75-year-old woman, whose car displayed a sticker supporting fox hunting.

In January 2009, after pleading not guilty at Winchester Crown Court, Nicholson was jailed for 11 years for conspiracy to blackmail during the SHAC campaign. Police obtained evidence to secure the conviction by bugging a 2007 meeting in a cottage in Moorcote, near Hook, Hampshire, attended by Nicholson and six other SHAC activists, as well as hired cars they had used. The bugging was part of Operation Achilles, a police operation against animal rights activists that led to 32 arrests in May 2007, carried out by 700 officers in England, Amsterdam and Belgium. Nicholson gave herself up to police when she heard about the raids; she was arrested and denied bail.

The court heard that Nicholson was among seven people who had made false paedophile accusations, caused criminal damage and used bomb hoaxes to intimidate companies associated with HLS. Two hundred and seventy companies severed ties to HLS as a result of the campaign. Avery and Dellemagne were jailed for nine years, and four other activists received sentences of between four and eight years. Nicholson was also served with an ASBO, restricting future contact with companies targeted in the campaign.

== See also ==
- List of animal rights advocates
