= Barry Horne (activist) =

English animal rights activist (1952–2001)

- Born: 17 March 1952; Northampton, England
- Died: 5 November 2001 (aged 49); Worcester, England
- Cause of death: Organ failure, hunger strikes
- Resting place: Northampton, England
- Occupation(s): Activist, Refuse collector
- Years active: 1987-2001
- Known for: Animal rights activism
- Children: 2

Barry Horne (17 March 1952 – 5 November 2001) was an English animal rights activist. He became known around the world in December 1998 when he engaged in a 68-day hunger strike in an effort to persuade the government to hold a public inquiry into animal testing, something the Labour Party had said it would do before it came to power in 1997. The hunger strike took place while Horne was serving an 18-year sentence for planting incendiary devices in stores that sold fur coats and leather products, the longest sentence handed down to any animal rights activist by a British court.

The hunger strike left Horne with kidney damage and failing eyesight, but it was neither the first nor the last he embarked upon, and when he died of liver failure three years later, he had not eaten for 15 days. Media reaction to his death in the UK was hostile, where he was widely described as a terrorist by journalists and politicians. He is viewed as a martyr within the more radical wing of the animal rights movement.

== Early life ==
Horne was born in Northampton, the son of a postman. He left school at 15 and took a series of jobs as a road sweeper and dustman.

== Activism ==
=== Northampton Animal Concern ===
Horne became interested in animal rights at the age of 35, when his second wife, Aileen, persuaded him to attend an animal liberation meeting. After watching videos of animal testing, he decided to become a vegetarian and hunt saboteur. He became active with Northampton Animal Concern in the spring of 1987, which organised a raid of a Unilever laboratory, and picketed Beatties, a department store that sold fur coats.

=== Rocky the dolphin ===
Horne first came to public attention in 1988 when he tried to rescue Rocky, a bottlenose dolphin captured in 1971 off the Florida Panhandle then kept for 20 years, most of the time alone, in a small concrete pool at Marineland in Morecambe, Lancashire. Horne and four other activists planned to move Rocky, who weighed 650 lb (290 kg), 200 yards from the pool to the sea, using a ladder, a net, a home-made stretcher, and a hired Austin-Rover Mini Metro.

Horne and his friends had already been visiting the dolphinarium secretly at night, getting into the pool with the dolphin in an effort to get to know him. On the night of the action, after arriving at the poolside with their equipment, they realised the logistics of the operation were beyond them, and they left without Rocky. A police car stopped them on the way back to their car, which contained a large dolphin stretcher for which, as one of the activists put it, "we had no legitimate explanation." After a five-day trial, they were convicted of conspiracy to steal the animal. Horne, Jim O'Donnell, Mel Broughton, and Jim Buckner were fined £500, and Horne and Broughton were given an additional six-month suspended sentence.

Horne and the others continued with their mission to free Rocky, and in 1989 launched the Morecambe Dolphinarium Campaign, picketing the dolphinarium, handing out leaflets to tourists, organising rallies, and lobbying the local council. Losing ticket sales, the management of Marineland eventually agreed to sell the dolphin for £120,000, money that was raised with the help of a number of animal charities, including the Born Free Foundation, and supported by the Mail on Sunday, which launched the "Into the Blue" campaign to free Britain's captive dolphins. In 1991, Rocky was transferred to an 80-acre (320,000 m^{2}) lagoon reserve in the Turks and Caicos Islands, then released, and within days was seen swimming with a pod of wild dolphins. Peter Hughes of the University of Sunderland cites Horne's campaign as an example of how promoting an animal rights perspective created a cultural shift in the UK toward seeing dolphins as "individual actors" who should be viewed in the wild if tourists want to interact with them. As a result, Hughes writes, there are now no captive dolphins in the UK.

=== Harlan Interfauna raid ===
Together with Keith Mann and Danny Attwood, Horne was part of a small Animal Liberation Front cell that raided Harlan Interfauna, a British company in Cambridge that supplies laboratory animals and organs, on 17 March 1990, Horne's 38th birthday. The activists entered Interfauna's animal units through holes they punched in the roof, removing 82 beagle puppies and 26 rabbits. They also removed documents listing Interfauna's customers, which included Boots, Glaxo, Beechams, and Huntingdon Research Centre, as well as a number of universities. A vet who was an ALF supporter removed the tattoos from the dogs' ears, and they were dispersed to new homes across the UK. As a result of evidence found at the scene and in one of the activists' homes, Mann and Attwood were convicted of conspiracy to burgle and were sentenced to nine months and 18 months respectively.

=== Exeter College raid ===
Early 1990s, Horne was one of a number of protesters who attacked an animal research conference at Exeter College, Oxford. They overturned tables and smashed 50 bottles of vintage claret, after fighting with police to enter the conference hall. Horne and five others were charged with violent disorder.

=== 1991: Imprisonment ===
In 1991, Horne was sentenced to three years for possession of explosive substances. His attitude appeared to harden while in jail. In June 1993, he wrote in the Support Animal Rights Prisoners Newsletter: "The animals continue to die and the torture goes on in greater and greater measure. Peoples' answer to this? More vegeburgers, more Special Brew and more apathy. There is no longer any Animal Liberation Movement. That died long ago. All that is left is a very few activists who care, who understand and who act ... If you don't act then you condone. If you don't fight then you don't win. And if you don't win then you are responsible for the death and suffering that will go on and on."

=== Firebombing and arrest ===
After his release in 1994, Horne reportedly began to operate alone. Keith Mann noted that the nature of police interest in animal rights activists was such that working alone was safer, and Horne was anyway a reserved man, happy to go out alone and "do stuff," as he put it.

A number of night-time firebomb attacks, using home-made incendiary devices, took place over the next two years in Oxford, Cambridge, York, Harrogate, London, Bristol, as well as Newport and Ryde on the Isle of Wight. The attacks targeted Boots stores, Halfords, stores selling leather goods, and stores run by cancer research charities. Some of the attacks were claimed by the Animal Rights Militia, a name used by activists unwilling to abide by the Animal Liberation Front's policy of non-violence. Mann writes that it "wasn't rocket science" to deduce that Horne had something to do with the attacks, because very few activists were willing to plant incendiary devices, and Horne was known to be one of the hard core who would. The police were therefore watching him closely. According to Mann, Horne knew he would be caught, but he saw animal rights activism as a war, and he was willing to become a casualty.

Police raided Horne's home in Swindon, Wiltshire, after the bombing campaign on the Isle of Wight, and reportedly found material advocating such attacks, but he was not charged. Police kept him under surveillance, and he was arrested in July 1996 and charged with planting two incendiary devices in the Broadmead shopping centre in Bristol — one in a charity shop and the second in British Home Stores, set to explode at midnight, when he assumed they would be empty. Police found a further four devices in his pockets.

=== 1997: 18-year sentence ===
Horne's trial for arson began on 12 November 1997, six weeks after the end of the second hunger strike, at Bristol Crown Court. He pleaded guilty to attempted arson in Bristol, but denied involvement in the Isle of Wight attacks. Although there was no direct evidence to link Horne to the Isle of Wight incidents, the prosecution argued successfully that the devices used in Bristol and the Isle of Wight were so similar that Horne should be regarded as responsible for both. He was put through 14 ID parades but was picked out in none of them.

Judge Simon Darwall-Smith described him as an "urban terrorist," though he also said, "I do accept that you did not intend an attack on human life." On 5 December 1997, the judge handed down an 18-year sentence, the longest given to any animal-rights protester. Because of the similarity between the Bristol devices and others used on the Isle of Wight, Horne was also accused of having caused damage estimated at £3 million in 1994 by destroying a branch of Boots in Newport, because the company tests its products on animals. He was further accused of having set fire to department stores on the island that sold fur coats. At his trial, he admitted the Bristol charges, but denied involvement in the Isle of Wight attacks, which had been claimed by the Animal Rights Militia. Robin Webb of the Animal Liberation Press Office writes that he himself narrowly escaped a conspiracy charge over the same incidents.

== Hunger strikes ==
=== January 1997: 35 days ===
On 6 January 1997, six months after being jailed on remand for the firebombings, as a Category A prisoner, Horne announced that he would refuse all food unless John Major's Conservative government pledged to withdraw its support for animal testing within five years. Because Labour was regarded as likely to win the next general election, due to be held in May 1997, Horne ended his action on 9 February after 35 days without food, when Elliot Morley, then Labour animal welfare spokesperson, wrote that "Labour is committed to a reduction and an eventual end to vivisection."

The hunger strike sparked an increase in animal rights activism, including the removal of cats from Hill Grove farm in Oxfordshire, which bred cats for laboratories; damage to Harlan breeding centre and the removal of beagles from Consort Kennels; the destruction of seven lorries at Buxted poultry plant in Northamptonshire; a blockade of the port of Dover and heavy damage to a McDonald's in the town; and the removal of rabbits being bred for vivisection in Homestead Farm.

=== August 1997: 46 days ===
The second hunger strike began on 11 August 1997. Horne's aim was that the new Labour government withdraw all animal testing licences within an agreed timeframe. There was another increase in animal-rights activism in his support. On 12 September 1997, protests were held in London and Southampton in the UK, in The Hague, in Cleveland, US and at Umeå University in Sweden, where activists tried to storm the university's laboratories. Four hundred people marched on Shamrock Farm, a primate-holding facility near Brighton, 300 on Wickham Laboratories, a contract testing facility, and Labour Party offices were picketed, as was the home of Jack Straw, the Home Secretary. Activists set up a camp opposite Huntingdon Life Sciences on the A1 in Cambridgeshire, digging tunnels to make eviction harder. Newchurch guinea pig farm was raided in September and 600 guinea pigs removed.

Horne ended the hunger strike on 26 September, after 46 days without food, when Lord Williams of Mostyn, then a Home Office minister and later Attorney-General, contacted Horne's supporters with an offer of talks between them and the government. This was the first time a member of the government had agreed formally to talk to the animal liberation movement, and it was seen by Horne and his supporters as an important step forward.

=== October 1998: 68 days ===
Horne's longest hunger strike began on 6 October 1998 and ended 68 days later on 13 December. It brought the issue of animal experimentation to the forefront of British politics, while his deteriorating condition made headlines around the world, as activists threatened further disruption should he die, with some issuing death threats against several scientists.

This time, Horne's demands were extensive and specific. He asked for an end to issuing licences for animal experiments, and that no current licences be renewed; a ban on all vivisection conducted for non-medical purposes; a commitment to end all vivisection by 6 January 2002; an immediate end to all animal experimentation at the Porton Down defence establishment; and the closure of the Animal Procedures Committee, a government advisory body that Horne regarded as a "Government sponsored front for the vivisection industry." He issued a statement, now quoted by the movement as a rallying cry:

The fight is not for us, not for our personal wants and needs. It is for every animal that has ever suffered and died in the vivisection labs, and for every animal that will suffer and die in those same labs unless we end this evil business now. The souls of the tortured dead cry out for justice, the cry of the living is for freedom. We can create that justice and we can deliver that freedom. The animals have no one but us. We will not fail them.

Keith Mann writes that, this time, Horne found the hunger strike tougher going, perhaps because of the physical damage from the first two. He was in D Wing in Full Sutton prison to begin with, then was moved to the hospital wing on day 10 without food, where he was reportedly placed in the "hunger strike cell" with no toilet or sink and with just a cardboard chair and cardboard table. He was moved to a regular cell after pressure from supporters. He was read the Last Rites on day 43, having lost 25 per cent of his body fat.

The Labour government publicly refused to give in to what it called blackmail, and said it would not negotiate with Horne or his supporters, but privately, it held talks with them. Horne's MP, Tony Clarke, visited Horne in prison on 12 November to negotiate another meeting between Horne's supporters and the Home Office, which took place on 19 November, 44 days into the strike. After the meeting, Horne released a statement saying there was nothing new on offer, and that his hunger strike would continue. He then reduced his demands to asking for a Royal Commission on animal testing, which the Labour Party had indicated that it would hold if elected.

On day 46, he was moved to York Hospital, suffering from dehydration after having spent the week vomiting. By day 52, he was reportedly in severe pain, was finding it hard to see, and was danger of falling into a coma. According to Mann, his supporters were bringing him tape recordings of the talks with the government, which he was having difficulty concentrating on. Mann writes that Horne decided to take some orange juice and sweet tea for three days, in order to stave off the coma so that he could understand the negotiations. This later caused the media to refer to the hunger strike as a fraud.

==== Activism in support of Horne ====
There was an international response by activists in support of Horne. In York and London, protesters kept vigil outside the hospital, and opposite the Houses of Parliament in Westminster, holding candles, placards, and photographs of Horne, joined at one point by Alan Clark, the Conservative Member of Parliament, who despite his support for the cause referred to the protesters in his diary as "dysfunctional."

On 24 November, at the State Opening of Parliament, activists dropped a banner in support of Horne in front of the Queen's official car as it drove towards the Houses of Parliament. Shortly after this, two activists parked a car at the end of Downing Street, slashed its tyres, and used D-Locks to attach themselves by the neck to the steering wheel, while protesters demonstrated nearby. Activists marched on BIBRA labs in south-west London and at Windmill mink farm in Dorset. In Finland, 400 foxes and 200 racoons were released from a fur farm. The offices of the Research Defence Society in London were raided. Demonstrations were held outside British embassies and consulates around the world, laboratories were raided, and government buildings picketed.

==== Death threats ====
When it appeared that Horne might die, the Animal Rights Militia (ARM) issued a statement through Robin Webb of the Animal Liberation Press Office, threatening to assassinate four named individuals and six unnamed scientists, should Horne die. The named targets were Colin Blakemore, a British scientist who studies vision; Clive Page of King's College, London, a professor of pulmonary pharmacology and chair of the animal science group of the British Biosciences Federation; Mark Matfield of the Research Defence Society; and Christopher Brown, owner of Hill Grove Farm in Oxfordshire, who was breeding cats for laboratories.

Those on the ARM's list were given immediate police protection, which in some cases lasted years, and Special Branch increased its surveillance of activists, in particular of Robin Webb. Clive Page told the BBC that he was in Italy when he heard his name was on the list. He had to return home to explain the situation to his family. "It's difficult to tell your children, 'Daddy's going to be murdered'," he said. The police wired his home up directly to Special Branch, he was advised to take different routes each day to work, and he had to speak to his children's schools about the possibility of abduction.

==== Moved back to prison ====
By day 63, Horne was deaf in one ear, blind in one eye, his liver was failing, and he was in considerable pain. A meeting was arranged for day 66 at noon with his supporters to show him the documents that were being faxed through by the Home Office regarding offers the government might be willing to make. It was agreed that, if there was any substance to them, Horne would call off the strike. Early on the morning of 10 December 1998, the 66th day of his hunger strike, Horne was moved out of hospital and back to Full Sutton Prison. The Home Office said that, because he was refusing treatment, there was no need for him to be in hospital. By now, Horne was hallucinating and could no longer remember why he was on hunger strike.

==== End of the hunger strike ====
There are two versions of why Horne ended the hunger strike. Mann wrote that Horne called it off without explanation two days after being moved back to prison, and was promptly returned to the hospital. The media reported that a Labour MP had arranged for Michael Banner, the chair of the Animal Procedures Committee, to agree to attend a meeting with Ian Cawsey, head of the All-Party Parliamentary Group on Animal Welfare, to discuss animal testing practices in the UK. This was interpreted by Horne as a concession on the part of the government, and he agreed to start eating again on 13 December 1998. His friends suspect that something happened to him during the two days he was back in Full Sutton out of contact with them. Mann writes: "Whatever happened to him between leaving the hospital and returning to prison may never be known, but all those close to him suspect something did and he was never the same again."

The British media response to the end of the hunger strike was hostile. Newspapers focused on the period Horne had been drinking orange juice and sweet tea, writing that the hunger strike had been a fraud throughout. Mann wrote that the media turned three days of trying to stabilise his condition with sips of sweet liquid into "68 days of feasting."

=== October 2001: 15 days ===
Horne did not recover his physical health. Mann wrote that he continued to go on countless hunger strikes in prison without any cohesive strategy and with little support. It got to the point where no one apart from the guards knew whether he was eating or not. He embarked on his final hunger strike on 21 October 2001, and died 15 days later of liver failure. He had signed a directive refusing medical treatment, and was regarded by psychiatrists as of sound mind, which caused the prison authorities not to intervene.

The hostile media response continued after his death. Kevin Toolis wrote in The Guardian:

In life he was a nobody, a failed dustman turned firebomber. But in death Barry Horne will rise up as the first true martyr of the most successful terrorist group Britain has ever known, the animal rights movement.

He was buried in his home town of Northampton under an oak tree in a woodland cemetery, wearing a Northampton Town football shirt. Seven hundred people attended the pagan funeral service and accompanied the coffin through the town, carrying a banner that read: "Labour lied, Barry died".

== See also ==
- List of animal rights advocates
