= Marshall Farms =

Animal breeder in New York, U.S.

Marshall BioResources
- Founded: 1939
- Website: marshallbio.com

Marshall BioResources (also known as Marshall Farms), based in North Rose, New York, is a commercial breeder of dogs and ferrets for pets and scientific research. Marshall Pet Products, a division of Marshall Farms founded in 1993, sells a wide range of food, toys, and other accessories for ferrets and rabbits.

The United States Department of Agriculture (USDA) has cited Marshall for more than 20 violations of the Animal Welfare Act since 2007. Animal rights groups such as PETA have attacked Marshall in the past for breeding animals for scientific and medical research. The company's facilities have been subject to protests and theft.

== History ==
Marshall BioResources is a commercial breeder of dogs, ferrets, and other animals for pets and scientific research. It is also known as Marshall Farms and Marshall Farms Group Ltd. Founded in 1939 by Gilman Marshall and based in North Rose, New York, the company is currently the largest ferret breeder in the United States. Marshall determined that ferrets could be used as a model to develop vaccines for canine distemper.

Ferrets from Marshall are sold in pet shops across the United States, Canada, Japan, and other countries. Ferrets, beagles, and other animals are also used in biomedicine laboratories, particularly in the fields of viral and parasitic diseases, cardiovascular and behavioral research, and reproductive endocrinology.

In 1993, Marshall Farms founded Marshall Pet Products, a division that sells a wide range of food, toys, and other accessories for ferrets and rabbits.

== Animal welfare ==
Marshall has been cited by the United States Department of Agriculture (USDA) for more than 20 violations of the Animal Welfare Act since 2007.

Animal rights groups such as PETA have attacked Marshall in the past for breeding animals for scientific and medical research. Whistleblowers have shown videos of the conditions of the company's facilities, which have drawn protestors. The firm was the subject of an Animal Liberation Front raid in 2001, in which it was claimed that 10 ferrets and 30 beagles were removed from the complex. Animal Rising removed 20 beagle puppies from a Cambridgeshire site in 2022.
