= Jake Conroy =

American animal rights activist

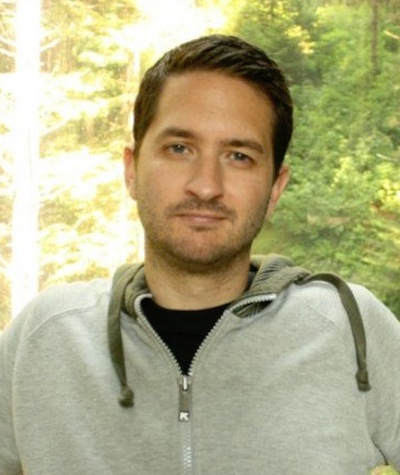
- Born: 1976 (age 49–50); Connecticut, United States
- Occupations: Design coordinator, Animal rights activist
- Era: 1995-present
- Known for: Sea Defence Alliance; Stop Huntingdon Animal Cruelty; SHAC 7 The Cranky Vegan
- Website: jakeconroy.com

Jake Conroy is an American animal rights activist and vegan who was involved with Stop Huntingdon Animal Cruelty (SHAC), an international campaign to force the closure of Huntingdon Life Sciences (HLS), an animal-testing company based in the UK and US, for which he designed and maintained the SHAC websites. Conroy had previously been a co-founder and activist for an anti-whaling group Ocean Defense International, formally called Sea Defence Alliance, and director of Northwest Animal Rights Network.

He was recognized among the top 100 most influential vegans by Plant Based News.

== Background ==
Conroy joined the animal rights movement in 1995 following an attack by the Animal Liberation Front on a restaurant near his home in Bellevue, Washington. He has been involved in a wide range of activism since graduating from art school, volunteering with and organizing various campaigns on local, regional, national and international levels.

He was influenced by his mother's involvement with Anti-Vietnam War Protests and his early interests in Hip Hop, Hardcore and Punk rock.

Conroy works for Rainforest Action Network, an environmental organization that pressures corporations to reduce involvement with international livestock trading, deforestation, mining, and other activities they deem harmful to animals or ecosystems. He was featured in Joaquin Phoenix's 'The Animal People' documentary about the SHAC7, and 'What the Health', a follow-up to the award-winning documentary Cowspiracy.

He also co-founded Bite Back, a magazine that promotes the causes of the animal liberation movement and the Animal Liberation Front. He created the popular food blog "Plant Based on a Budget" and has worked on campaigns for people with HIV/AIDS as well as anti-death penalty movements.

In January 2018, Conroy created his "The Cranky Vegan" YouTube channel, focusing on rethinking the strategies and tactics of the grassroots animal rights movement, with popular series like "3 Minute Thursday" and "Are We Winning".

== Ocean Defense International ==
Aged 22 years old, campaigning against the Makah whale hunt, as co-founder and Vice President of Sea Defence Alliance/Ocean Defense International, Conroy was arrested by U.S. Coast Guard for obstructing it while piloting a 19 foot RHIB. It was the first ever disruption of a whale hunt in US coastal waters.

By directly putting themselves between the hunted and hunter in various vessels, Jake and ODI reduced the anticipated kill of 20 Pacific Gray whales down to one.

== SHAC campaign ==
On May 26, 2004, fifteen armed FBI agents broke small home in Pinole, California with Federal Air Marshals circling in helicopters. Described as "target[ing] thousands of individuals and hundreds of companies in attacks designed to shut down Huntingdon Life Sciences (HLS)", of East Millstone near Princeton, Conroy was among seven animal rights advocates who were arrested in May 2004 (dubbed the SHAC7) and charged with trying to disrupt the work of the New Jersey pharmaceutical company. In its drug testing, HLS, a British firm, used dogs, primates and rats in vivisection experiments. "The group liken[ed] its activities to the Underground Railroad and the Boston Tea Party, and advocat[ing] protests, letter-writing, and what it call[ed] publicity stunts to disrupt Huntingdon Life Sciences".

In 2006, branded as a "domestic terrorist", Conroy was sentenced to 4 years in prison for his involvement in the campaign against Huntingdon Life Sciences as a member of SHAC USA, one of the most successful animal rights campaigns in history leading to HLS's market value falling by 90%. It was the first use of the 1992 Animal Enterprise Protection Act. Their appeal was denied.

SHAC introduced targeted strategy to direct action, including a knowledge of modern business organization which understood that businesses are sustained by a wide selection of secondary and tertiary businesses including insurers, investors, even cafeteria suppliers, and targeted its actions at them as well. Conroy's use of the internet was key to its success.

The Animal Enterprise Protection Act had been signed into law by President George W. Bush to provide animal research facilities with federal protection against violent acts by "animal rights extremists", defining “Animal Enterprise Terrorism" as "physical disruption to the functioning of an animal enterprise by intentionally stealing, damaging, or causing the loss of any property (including animals or records)."

== See also ==
- List of animal rights advocates
