= Mel Broughton =

British landscape gardener

Mel Brown (born Mel Broughton; 5 July 1960) is a British landscape gardener and animal rights activist who rose to public prominence due to a planned bombing campaign aimed at preventing the construction of a new research laboratory at Oxford University. He was the co-founder in 2004, with Robert Cogswell, of SPEAK, The Voice for the Animals, a campaign to stop animal testing in Britain, which is focused on opposition to a new animal laboratory at Oxford University.

Broughton was sentenced to four years in 1998 after police found a firebomb in his car. He was arrested again and remanded in custody in December 2007 after the Animal Liberation Front planted incendiary devices in Oxford University colleges. A jury cleared him of possessing explosive substances, but failed to reach a verdict on other charges. Following his retrial in 2009 he was convicted and sentenced to 10 years in prison for conspiracy to commit arson. However, in March 2010 Mel Broughton had his conviction overturned, arguing that the DNA evidence in the case had been unreliable. He was later granted bail with "stringent conditions" and was re-tried in June/July 2010. On 13 July 2010 Broughton was once again found guilty and returned to prison to complete the balance of his sentence.

On his release, he continued his campaigns, and in September 2020 was seriously injured when trampled by a horse while protesting a Northamptonshire hunt.

== Early life ==
Broughton's father is a former painter and decorator and his mother, Pauline, a care assistant in an old people's home. Both are committed animal rights advocates who work alongside Broughton on the SPEAK campaign. His mother, 70 years old at the time, was injured in September 2004 when a construction worker at Oxford University threw a white burning substance at her during an animal rights demonstration.

== Activism ==
Broughton has been involved in animal rights for over 30 years. He worked on Operation Osprey in Scotland when he was 15, living in a tent to guard osprey nests. He later worked in animal sanctuaries, and campaigned against zoos, circuses, factory farming, and live animal exports.

He lives in Northampton with Bella, a rescue dog, devoting most of his time to SPEAK. He told The Independent on Sunday:

This was always my life, but now it takes up so much of my life that it's very difficult. In fact survival is very, very hard. My flat's nothing special – two rooms – and I live as frugally as I possibly can to make sure I can campaign. I'm not trying to make myself out to be a martyr because this is my choice.

=== Rocky the dolphin ===
Broughton was first arrested in 1988, when he and three other activists, including Barry Horne – who died in 2001 during an animal-rights hunger strike – tried to remove Rocky, a bottlenose dolphin, from a small concrete pool inside Marineland, in Morecambe, Lancashire. Rocky had been in the pool, mostly alone, for 17 years, after being captured off the coast of Florida in 1971.

Broughton and the others intended to move the dolphin, who weighed 650 lbs, 200 yards from the pool to the sea, using a ladder, a net, a home-made dolphin stretcher, and a hired Mini Metro. On the night of the action, they realised the logistics of the operation were beyond them, and decided to abandon their plans, but were arrested when the police found them with the dolphin stretcher in the back of the car. Broughton, Horne, Jim O'Donnell, and Jim Buckner were fined £500, while Broughton and Horne were also given six-month suspended sentences.

The management of Marineland eventually agreed to give Rocky to campaigners in response to Broughton and others picketing the facility. In 1991, Rocky was transferred to a lagoon reserve in the Turks and Caicos Islands, then released. Peter Hughes of the University of Sunderland cites the campaign as an example of how promoting an animal rights perspective created a paradigm shift toward seeing dolphins as individuals, as a result of which, he wrote, there are now no captive dolphins in the UK.

=== 1999 possession and conspiracy charges ===
Broughton was first jailed in 1999 after police found a bomb in the boot of his car. He was convicted of conspiracy to cause an explosion likely to endanger life. He was sentenced to four years, and released in June 2002 after serving two years and eight months.

Broughton told The Independent on Sunday that he took the chance to educate himself while in prison, studying philosophy and social sciences with the Open University. "I found a lot of sympathy inside," he told the newspaper, "but a lot of the general prisoners found it very difficult to understand that I was inside for something I'd done for no personal gain."

=== SPEAC and SPEAK campaigns ===
In July 2003, Broughton and Robert Cogswell set up a campaign to halt construction of a new non-human primate research facility at Cambridge University, the plans for which suggested it would be Europe's largest primate vivisection centre. The Stop Primate Experiments at Cambridge (SPEAC) campaign succeeded in persuading the university to abandon its plans in January 2004.

Shortly thereafter, SPEAC learned that Oxford University planned to build a new animal research laboratory, including a non-human primate lab, in the university's science area. The activists said that talks between Oxford and Cambridge had resulted in Oxford agreeing to conduct the brain experiments that were lost with the abandonment of Cambridge's plans. SPEAC became SPEAK, The Voice for the Animals, relaunching itself as a campaign to halt all animal testing in the UK, with its second target the new Oxford lab, which opened in November 2008.

=== 2009 conviction for conspiracy to commit arson ===
In connection with his role in the SPEAK campaign, Broughton was charged in December 2007 with conspiracy to blackmail and possession of incendiary devices after fire broke out inside a sports pavilion belonging to Queen's College, Oxford in November 2006, and two petrol bombs were found inside the university's Templeton College in February 2007. The Animal Liberation Front claimed responsibility for the attacks.

Police arrested Broughton after finding a university employee's security pass and a notebook containing a list of targets for "direct action" under a carpet, and sparklers and a battery connector in an unused water tank at his house. The prosecution alleged that Broughton's DNA matched a sample found on the fuse on one of the petrol bombs.

Transcripts were submitted to the court during Broughton's trial of a recording in which Oxford police discussed a "dirty war" against Broughton, and how they were going to "get him." Broughton told the court that he was under constant police surveillance.

The jury was discharged in November 2008 after clearing Broughton of keeping an explosive substance with intent, but failing to reach verdicts on the other charges. Broughton was remanded in custody until his retrial in February 2009, whereupon he was found guilty of conspiracy to commit arson and sentenced to ten years by Oxford Crown Court. Judge Patrick Eccles QC accused Broughton of being part of a "ruthless conspiracy" against the Oxford Biomedical Facility.

In March 2010, Mel Broughton had his conviction overturned due to the 'unsafe' way in which the trial judge summed up the conviction, with Broughton arguing the DNA evidence in the case had been unreliable. He was later granted bail on "stringent conditions" that he does not engage in animal rights activities and enter Oxfordshire. He was re-tried in June 2010. On 13 July 2010 he was found guilty at the retrial, and sentenced to 10 years imprisonment.

== See also ==
- List of animal rights advocates
