= Brian Cass =

Business executive

Brian Cass is a former managing director of Huntingdon Life Sciences, a contract research organisation company that was based in Huntingdon in the United Kingdom and New Jersey in the United States. Before moving to Huntingdon Life Sciences, Cass was the managing director of Covance (now Fortrea). He was appointed a CBE in 2002.

== Career ==
He was appointed to the Board of Huntingdon as Managing Director/Chief Operating Officer in 1998. He became a Director and Managing Director/President of LSR Inc in 2002. He has held directorships with North Yorkshire Training & Enterprise Council Ltd and Business Link North Yorkshire Ltd. He was elected to be a Vice President of the Institute of Animal Technology in 2009. In the time Cass has been managing director at Huntingdon Life Sciences, he has doubled the company's revenues from $93m in 1999 to $191m in 2009.

== Honours and awards ==
- Cass was appointed a CBE in 2002 for services to medical research.
- Cass was awarded the Pharmaceutical Times' Industry Award in 2002 for the Outstanding Achievement of the Year.
- The Pharma Award was presented to Cass at the Pharmaceutical Times’ Great Oxford Debate in Oxford University's Union. In a vote comprising 81 directors from 50 UK pharmaceutical companies, 80% gave their backing to Cass, beating Secretary of State for Health, Alan Milburn, Chairman of NICE, Sir Michael Rawlins, and the Director-General of The Association of the British Pharmaceutical Industry, Dr Trevor Jones.
- In 2006 Cass was presented with the Award of the Central Veterinary Society Victory Medal.

== Victim of intimidation ==
Huntingdon Life Sciences has been the target Stop Huntingdon Animal Cruelty since 1999, a campaign run by British and American animal-rights activists, who seek to close the company down for its treatment of, and experimentation upon, live animals.

The campaign has included acts of intimidation and violence, including against Cass, who sustained head injuries when he was attacked outside his home on 22 February 2001 by three people armed with pickaxe handles and CS gas. A neighbour who tried to help him was sprayed with the gas. Detective Chief Inspector Tom Hobbs of Cambridgeshire police told reporters: "It's only by sheer luck that we are not beginning a murder inquiry." David Blenkinsop, who had previously engaged in actions using the name of the Animal Liberation Front, was jailed for three years for the attack.
