= His Majesty King Charles III (portrait) =

Painting by Jonathan Yeo

His Majesty King Charles III (2021-2023) by Jonathan Yeo

His Majesty King Charles III is a portrait of King Charles III by Jonathan Yeo. It was painted between June 2021 and November 2023, a period encompassing Charles's accession to the throne, and was the first official portrait of the King since his coronation. It was commissioned by the Worshipful Company of Drapers.

== History and description ==
Measuring about 8 feet 6 inches (2.59 m) by 6 feet 6 inches (1.98 m), the work is in a vivid red and shows Charles in the uniform of the Welsh Guards.

Yeo explained his abundant deployment of the colour red in stating ..."The colour was an early experiment and then I sketched it out and worked on the face, and the face and background worked so well," and then went on to say ...."I just then worked on making sure nothing else interfered with the balance. It was a nice mix of the traditional and the contemporary."

Above his right shoulder is a butterfly, symbolising his accession. Katie Razzall, writing for the BBC, described it as "a vibrant painting". Yeo explains, "Primarily a symbol of the beauty and precariousness of nature, it highlights the environmental causes the King has championed most of his life and certainly long before they became a mainstream conversation, but it also serves a compositional purpose, providing a visual contrast to the military steeliness of the uniform and sword. In the context of art history, a butterfly often the symbol of metamorphosis and rebirth, and thus also parallels the King's transition from Prince to monarch during the period the portrait was created".

Queen Camilla reportedly told Yeo approvingly: "Yes, you've got him." It was displayed at the Philip Mould Gallery in London from 16 May to 14 June 2024. Since the end of August 2024 it has been displayed at Drapers Hall.

== Virality ==
The portrait has received many mixed and meme reactions on social media sites such as Twitter for its red colour scheme, which has been compared to "flames, blood, and horror films". This was brought to Yeo's attention by his daughter; he expressed flattery over the reaction.

The work has been compared to Francis Bacon's 1949 painting Head VI.

== Vandalism ==
Protestors from the Animal Rising collective attached posters depicting Wallace, of Wallace and Gromit, with a caption, to the glass case of the portrait, in June 2024, in protest against the conditions in "assured farms" accredited by the RSPCA, of which the King is a patron.
