= Animal Rising =

Activist group

- Formation: June 2019; 7 years ago
- Founded at: London
- Headquarters: London
- Location: United Kingdom
- Volunteers: 100 organisers
- Website: www.animalrising.org
- Formerly called: Animal Rebellion

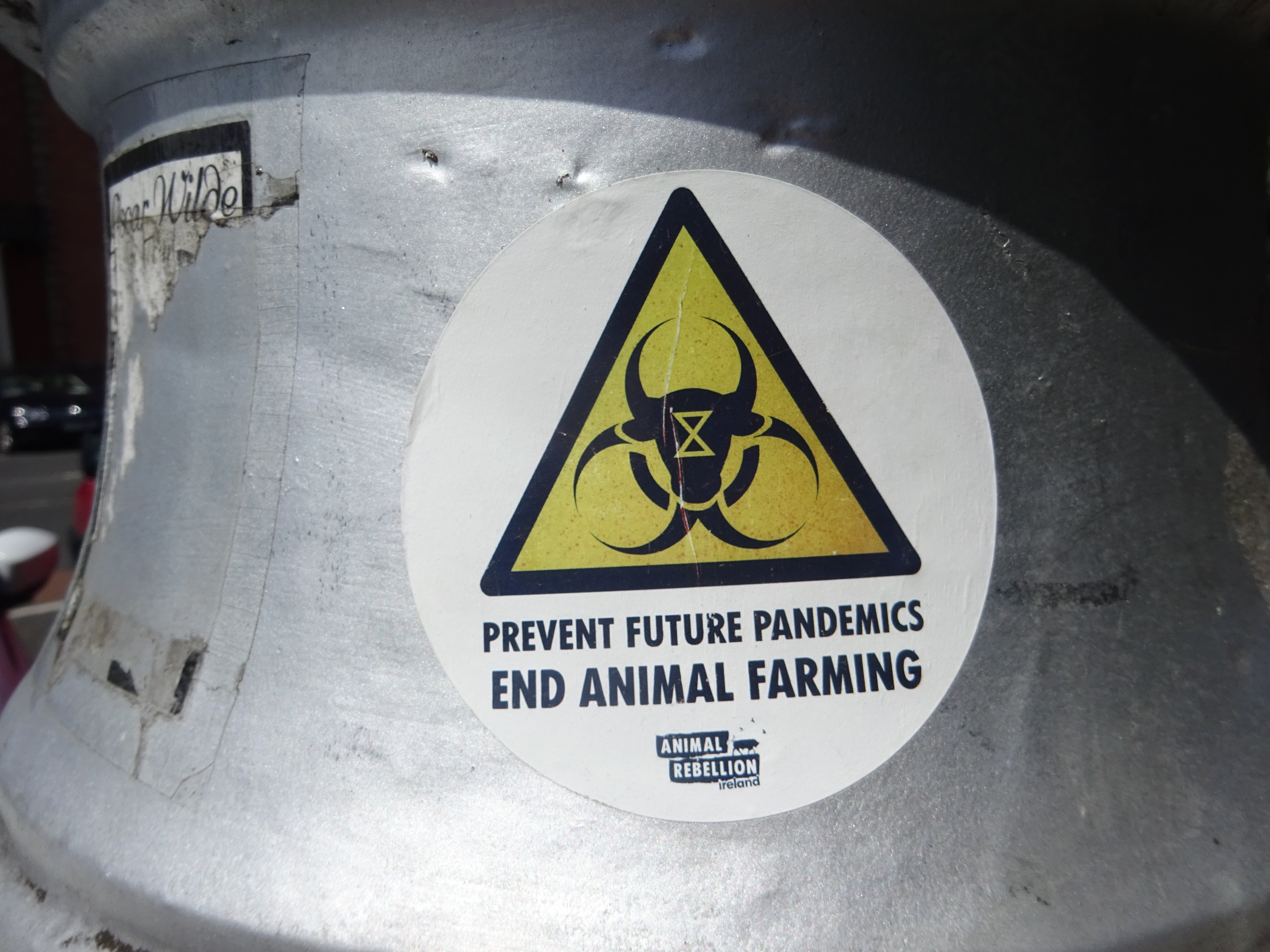
Animal Rebellion sticker referencing zoonotic disease, Ireland.

Animal Rising (formerly Animal Rebellion) is a British animal activist movement with the stated aim of compelling social change towards animal rights and a plant-based food system. They justify their actions with the impact of animal agriculture on climate change, species extinction and ecosystem breakdown.

Animal Rising use civil disobedience methods that have frequently resulted in its members being arrested. Their methods include graffiti, destruction of property, blockading and preventing food distribution, trespassing onto livestock industry premises, and blockading streets. The movement states on its website that it is nonviolent and focuses its actions on systems, not individuals.

The targets of their actions have included dairy and other livestock companies, horse racing courses, the British royal family, government offices, supermarkets, and restaurants.

The organisation was founded in June 2019 as Animal Rebellion, as a sister organisation to Extinction Rebellion, an emerging and headline-making movement at the time. It had 12 founding members, including Daniel Kidby and Alex Lockwood, and by autumn 2019 grew to a size of 100 organisers.

In April 2023, Animal Rebellion changed its name to Animal Rising to take a "firm" step away from the Extinction Rebellion movement and prioritize animal rights issues. Animal Rising pledged to "take direct action to see an end to animal suffering in all its forms".

== Demands ==
As of early 2023, Animal Rebellion made two demands of the United Kingdom government:

- The UK Government supports farmers and fishing communities to move away from animal farming and fishing as part of an urgent and immediate transition to a plant-based food system
- The UK Government commits to rewild the freed-up land and ocean as part of a broader programme of wildlife restoration and carbon drawdown

== Protests ==
Logo of Animal Rebellion, in use from 2019 to 2023

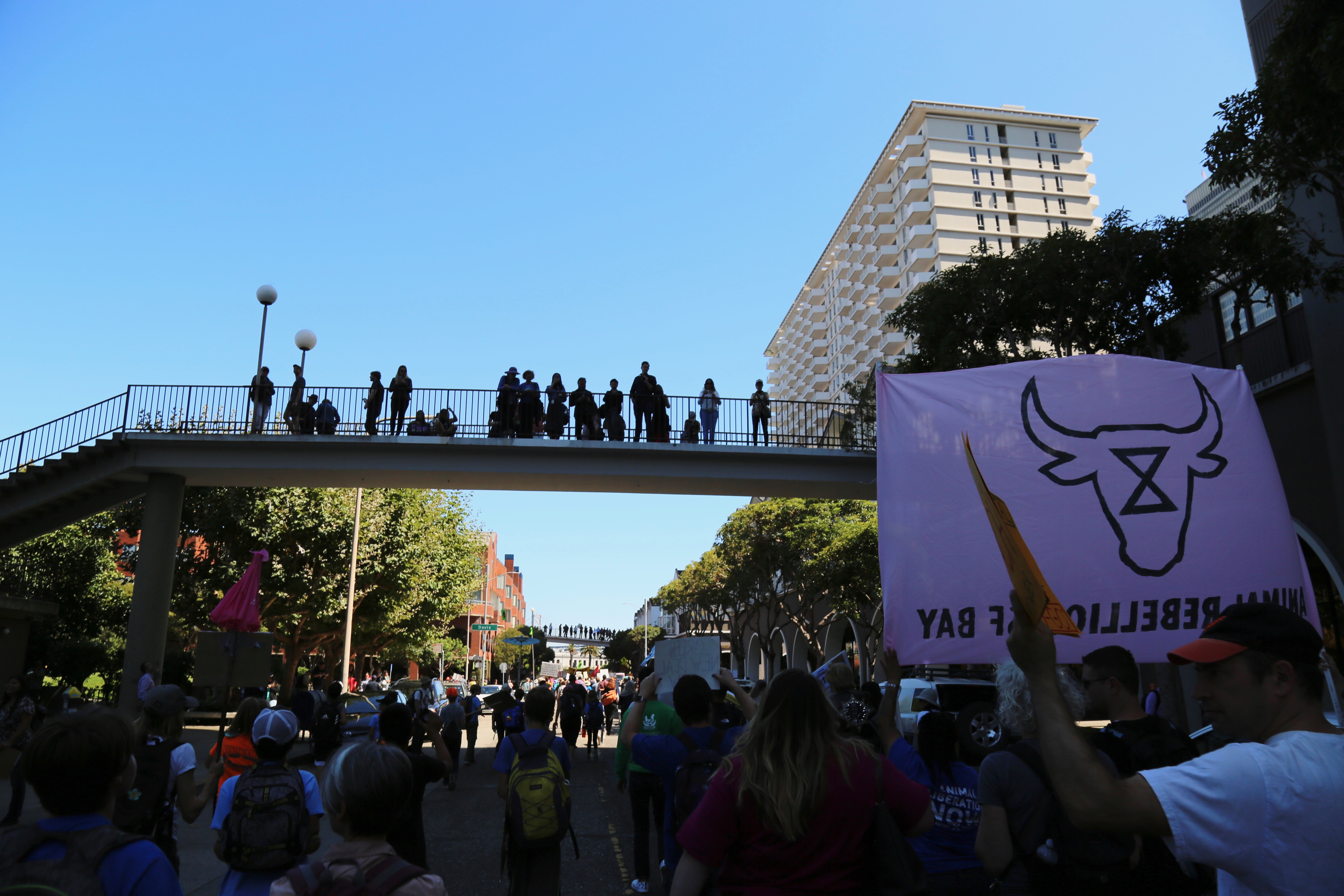
Animal Rebellion protesters at the September 2019 climate strikes in San Francisco.

=== 2019-20: Extinction Rebellion protests and abattoir blockades ===
From 7 October to 19 October 2019, Animal Rebellion organised a wave of civil disobedience in London and Berlin, in parallel to Extinction Rebellion protests. Animal Rebellion protested in front of the UK Department for Environment, Food and Rural Affairs (Defra) and the German Ministry of Food and Agriculture, at Smithfield meat market, the largest UK meat market, and Billingsgate Fish Market, and at an abattoir in Farnborough, Hampshire, leading to several dozen arrests for obstruction of traffic and "obstruction or disruption of a person engaged in lawful activity". They reported that the abattoir protest was to highlight the role the farming industry plays in the climate crisis, as well as animal welfare issues and the conditions for abattoir workers.

In 2020, Animal Rebellion staged protests in the UK, Ireland and the Czech Republic in September. This included the blockade of a pig slaughterhouse near Manchester, England.

In London, they vandalised the Trafalgar Square fountain by dying the water red, resulting in two arrests and a bill for the council to clean the water. This was to protest the use of crown lands for hunting and animal agriculture, as well as the Queen's attempts to have her land exempted from an initiative to cut carbon emissions.

In October, Animal Rebellion protested in Berlin (Germany) and Auckland (New Zealand).

=== 2021: Meat and dairy factory blockades ===
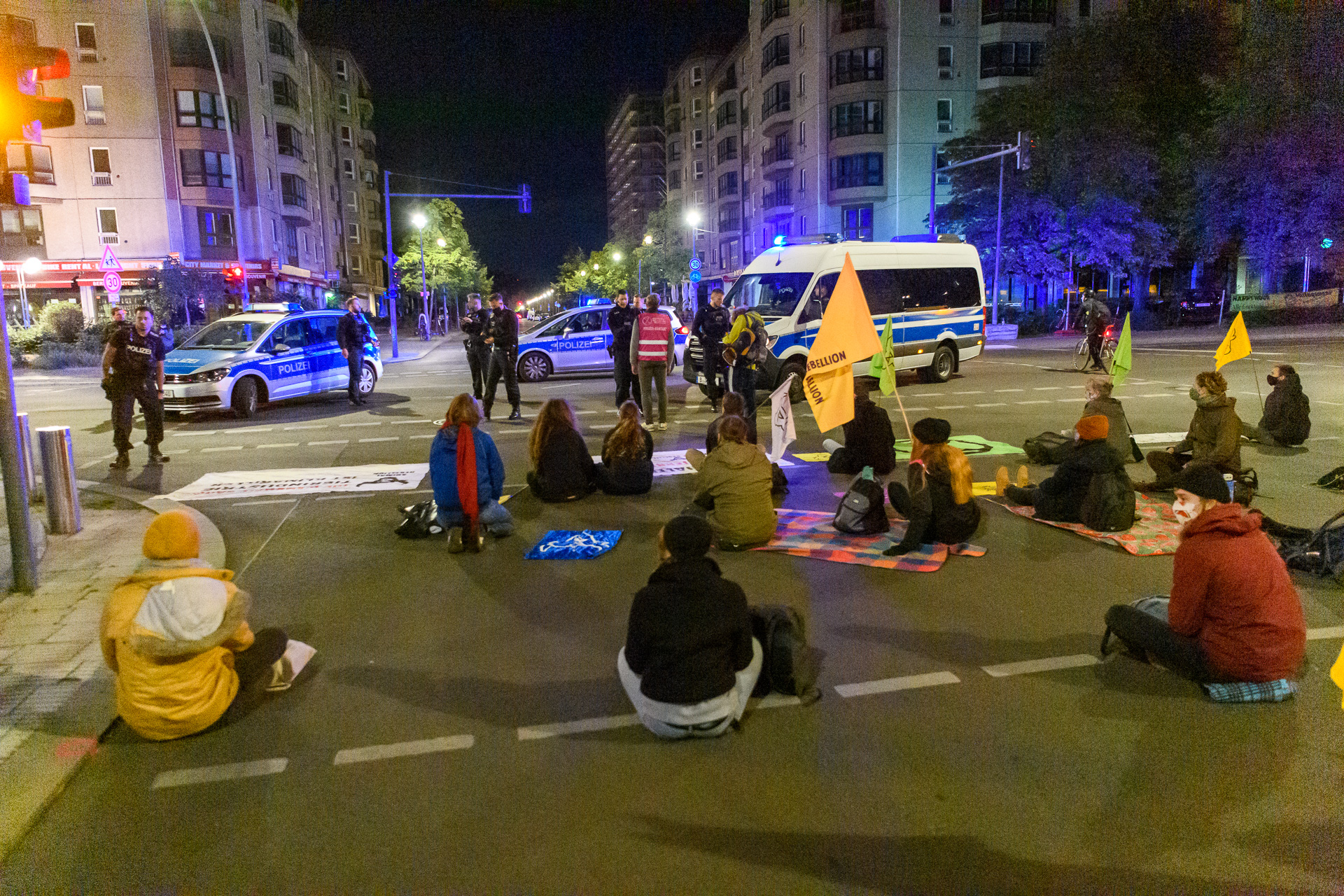
Animal Rebellion blocking the agriculture ministry in Berlin, Germany in 2020.

Animal Rebellion protesters blocked the entrance of a Tnuva dairy logistics centre in Petah Tikva, Israel, in February 2021. Similarly, Animal Rebellion blocked the entrances of four McDonald's UK distribution centres in May 2021, demanding the fast-food chain go entirely plant-based by 2025. An Animal Rebellion spokesperson said that what others call sustainable meat is insufficient to mitigate the climate crisis.

Continuing their attack on McDonald's, the group blocked the entrance to the OSI Food Solutions factory in Scunthorpe, England in July 2021. The factory is the "only UK factory that makes McDonald's burgers", Animal Rebellion stated. Like the protest in May, they demanded the chain change their menu to entirely plant-based food by 2025.

On 28 August 2021, they coordinated a protest with Camp Beagle at Smithfield Market in London. During that month, they also held a "McSitin" at Leicester Square, dyed the fountain in front of Buckingham Palace red and blocked the trucks of Arla's biggest UK dairy processing plant which is in Aylesbury.

During the annual UN Climate Change conference COP26 in October 2021, Animal Rebellion protesters climbed the Home Office building.

=== 2022: Dairy dumping ===
On 2 June 2022, Animal Rebellion in London disrupted the trooping the colour parade, running into the Mall and throwing themselves in front of the procession, in a renewed protest against the royal family's support of animal agriculture. Two days later, six female protesters ran onto the course of the Epsom Derby horse race before its start. The action was on the anniversary of Emily Davison's famous suffragette protest at the same derby 109 years earlier. In both cases, the activists were removed by police officers and were arrested.

On 8 August 2022, the protesters stormed the Royal Society for the Prevention of Cruelty to Animals (RSPCA), and occupied the national headquarters. They refused to leave the building, blocking the front doors and hosting impromptu workshops until the RSPCA agreed to declare its support for transitioning to a fully plant-based food system.

In June 2022, a group of protesters stormed Harrods and another store in London. They took cartons of milk and emptied them in the stores. In early September 2022, Animal Rebellion declared it would disrupt dairy supplies during September. On 3 September, activists blocked access to milk at supermarkets in four cities. On 4 September, activists disrupted fresh milk supplies at four Müller and Arla distribution centres. In mid-October 2022, activists from Animal Rebellion held protests by pouring milk on the floor in various stores and supermarkets across Britain, including Harrods, Marks & Spencer, Waitrose and Fortnum & Mason.

In November 2022, Animal Rebellion members joined Just Stop Oil in a protest on the M25 motorway in the UK.

Also in November 2022, they occupied Gordon Ramsay's three-star Michelin restaurant in Chelsea, London.

=== 2023-24: Attempted horse race blockades and halt on direct action ===
On 14 February 2023, Animal Rebellion blocked London's Westminster Bridge in a Valentine's Day protest. This led to the arrest of five Animal Rebellion protesters. One additional person was arrested for bodily assaulting the protesters.

In early April 2023, it was revealed that Animal Rebellion planned to disrupt the 2023 Grand National horse race at Aintree Racecourse. Animal Rebellion then renamed itself Animal Rising. On April 15, Animal Rising blocked the Grand National at Aintree. They delayed the race by 15 minutes, leading to the arrest of 118 activists for delaying the race and for public order offences. A spokesman for Aintree Racecourse stated that "their actions could endanger the horses they purport to protect, as well as jockeys, officials and themselves".

The next day, trainer Sandy Thomson told the BBC that the 14-minute delay caused by protesters was to blame for the death of racehorse Hill Sixteen. However, the British Horseracing Authority, which condemned the protests, could not find a "direct parallel" between the delay caused by the protests and Hill Sixteen's death. Animal Rising spokesman Ben Newman argued that the protests were meant to stop the race to prevent the deaths of horses, and to start a dialogue about our broken relationship with animals. He also stated that the public does not blame the group for the horse's death. Following Hill Sixteen's death, the RSPCA called for reforming the size of the field, noting that only 17 of the 39 horses completed the race that day.

Animal Rising stated they planned to target other major horse racing events. The group attempted to disrupt that year's Epsom Derby but failed, with only a single individual making it onto the track before being removed without impacting the races. Plans to disrupt the Royal Ascot were abandoned by the group.

In April 2024, the group stated it wouldn't attempt to disrupt the 2024 Grand National, and that it would be indefinitely suspending similar actions.

In June 2024, protestors attached posters depicting Wallace, of Wallace and Gromit, with a caption, to the glass case of a recently unveiled portrait of King Charles III in protest against the conditions in "assured farms" accredited by the RSPCA, of which the King is a patron.
