= Shamrock Farm =

Primate importation centre in England

Shamrock Farm was the United Kingdom's only non-human primate importation and quarantine centre, located in Small Dole, near Henfield in West Sussex. The centre, owned by Bausch and Lomb and run by Charles River Laboratories, Inc. for Shamrock (GB) Ltd, provided animals to various laboratories and universities for use in animal testing. It was Europe's largest supplier of primates to laboratories, and held up to 350 monkeys at a time.

It closed in 2000 after a 15-month protest by British animal rights activists, who campaigned under the name "Save the Shamrock Monkeys".

== Background ==
The company was set up in 1954, trading in wild-caught primates until 1993 and captive-bred ones thereafter. The animals were held in windowless cabins in the company's 40,000 sq ft (3,700 m^{2}) facility, surrounded by 16 ft-high fences, razor wire, and cameras. A touch-sensitive wire ran along the base of the perimeter, with CCTV cameras zooming in on any spot that was touched.

Primates captured from the wild, or purchased from breeding facilities, were held there for two months for tests, until they were ready to be sold to animal testing laboratories across Europe. It was Europe's largest supplier of primates to laboratories, and held up to 350 monkeys at a time, processing 2,500 a year on average, and selling them for around £1,600 each. The company bought and sold baboons, macaques, grivet, patas, and squirrel monkeys; almost all of the 2,467 macaques used in British laboratories in 1998 came through Shamrock. Its customers included Huntingdon Life Sciences, SmithKline Beecham, GlaxoWellcome, the Porton Down military science park, and the Universities of Oxford, Cambridge, London, Glasgow, and Manchester, according to Animal Aid.

According to Keith Mann, Shamrock also took primates from British zoos and theme parks, including 83 macaques from Longleat, 32 from Woburn Abbey, and several different species from Ravensden and Robin Hill on the Isle of Wight.

The company's main customer was Huntingdon Life Sciences, which in one year purchased 373 cage-bred macaques, 440 wild-caught monkeys, eight squirrel monkeys, and 37 baboons, according to documents obtained by activists. Keith Mann writes that Shamrock delivered nearly 50,000 monkeys to laboratories in Britain during the 1990s.

== BUAV investigation ==
In 1992, an undercover investigation by the British Union for the Abolition of Vivisection (BUAV) found high mortality rates among the monkeys from enteritis and pneumonia, while other monkeys were being killed if they were underweight or suffered from deformities. The primates were allegedly denied socialization, stimulation, or environmental enrichment, and engaged in stereotypical behaviours, such as continuous rocking, twisting, self-mutilation, and wailing. BUAV also witnessed rough handling by staff, who were alleged to have been inadequately trained. The campaign garnered national recognition when footage secretly filmed within the facility by a protester posing as an employee was broadcast on the investigative current affairs programme World in Action.

Following the BUAV investigation, the company announced in 1993 that it would stop buying wild primates. It started trading instead in primates from breeding centres in China, Mauritius, and the Philippines, although no laws exist in these countries to prevent stocks of primates being brought in from the wild.

== Closure ==
The primate operation shut down in 2000 and the farm was closed. In 2003 the facility re-opened as a business park, the anti-protester infrastructure re-purposed to provide a high security environment. In 2014 it was reported that the commercial enterprise had closed and there were plans to demolish the buildings and replace them with residential property.

== See also ==
- Animal testing on non-human primates
- International trade in primates
- Camp Beagle
- Consort beagles
- Stop Huntingdon Animal Cruelty
- Save the Newchurch Guinea Pigs
- Save the Hill Grove Cats
- List of animal rights groups
