= Consort beagles campaign =

British animal rights campaign

The Consort beagles campaign was founded in 1996 by British animal rights activists Greg Avery and Heather James, with a view to closing Consort Kennels in Hereford, a commercial breeder of beagles for animal testing laboratories.

== Background ==
The company closed in September 1997 after a ten-month campaign consisting of daily protests and raids carried out by the Animal Liberation Front, including the removal in May 1997 of 26 beagles.

Following the company's closure, the same group of activists set up Save the Hill Grove Cats, Stop Huntingdon Animal Cruelty, and other campaigns that have jointly altered the nature of the animal rights movement in the UK.

== Protest ==
The campaign came to public attention on 24 April 1997, World Day for Laboratory Animals, when an estimated five hundred protesters turned up for a national demonstration at the kennels located in a field off the A49 road between Ross-on-Wye and Hereford.

Activists breached the fence causing it to come down, and a handful of protesters crossed the security area and climbed over the compound wall. The area was then secured by three hundred police officers in riot gear, until two masked men appeared on the single storey building holding a beagle they had removed from the kennels. Following an hour of rioting, the pregnant beagle was lowered to a group of around forty people. The dog was later returned to the kennels by police.

== See also ==
- Animal Liberation Front
- Camp Beagle
- Save the Hillgrove Cats
- Stop Huntingdon Animal Cruelty
- Save the Newchurch Guinea Pigs
- Shamrock Farm
- Leaderless resistance
