= Tilt fuze =

Device to detonate explosives after a sudden movement

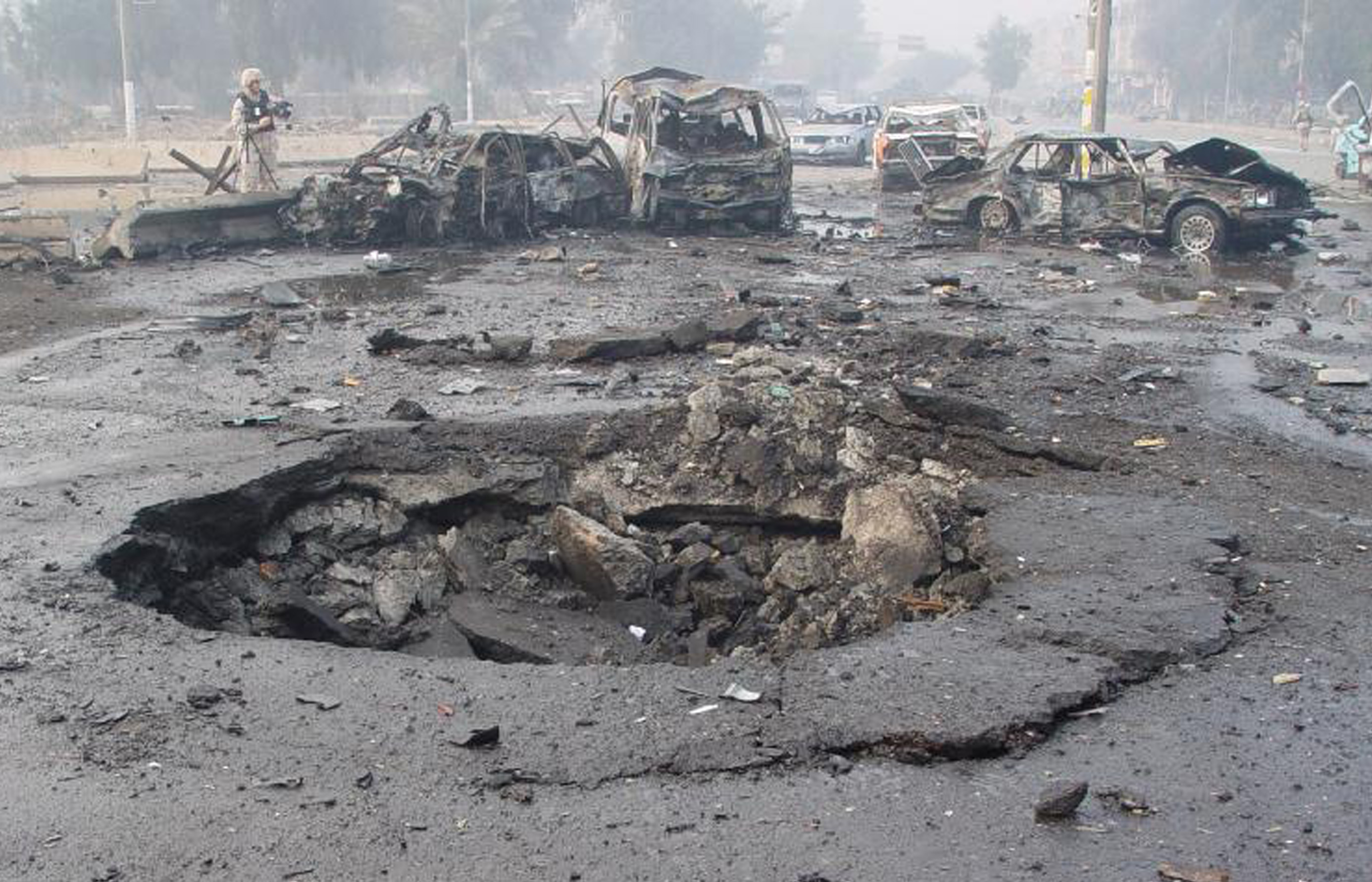
The result of a car bombing in Baghdad, Iraq

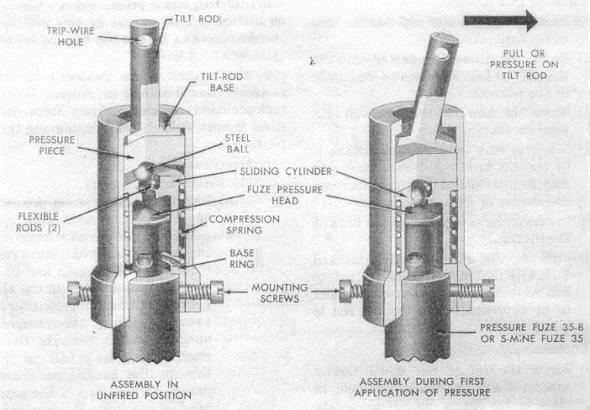
Diagram of a tilt fuze

A tilt fuze or fuse is a device usually used in the operation of car bombs and other such detonators, relying on the force of a jerk or similar movement for the triggering of the desired explosion.

The tilt fuze is typically a home-made mercury switch. It consists of a small tube no larger than a medical tablet bottle, made from plastic, glass or some other such material. At the bottom end of the tube, a certain volume of mercury is placed, while at the cap end are wired two live electrical contacts linked to a battery and bomb. This apparatus is then fixed lengthwise to the target vehicle; most usually, the tube is attached to the underside, below the driver or passenger's seat (depending on the desired target and the strength and quantity of the detonators) or within the mudguards.

The function of the fuze is such that when it is tilted or moved, the mercury – a liquid metal – will slide down the tube and close the electrical circuit wired to the bomb. Once the circuit is closed, the electric current will then be able to bridge the previously open gap and activate the bomb presumably concealed in another part of the vehicle. Such a tilting of the tilt fuze will likely occur over the regular bumps and jerks of the vehicle driving, ascension up the slope of a hill, or the depression of the brake or acceleration pedals, depending on the placement of the tube.

Due to the volatility in the conduction of the operation, bombers often take precautionary measures to prevent accidental tilting of the fuze while they are setting up. These often include a timer incorporated with the electric current; the bomber may set a certain time period before the contacts become live, therefore ensuring that the bomb cannot be activated until the bomber is well clear of the area.

Tilt fuzes sometimes meet use with the anti-handling devices incorporated into munitions such as the VS-50 mine. The Luftwaffe in World War II are known to have made use of variants of the tilt fuze in their bomb fuzes. Tilt fuzes have been used extensively by the Irish Republican Army and Irish National Liberation Army since 1979.
