= Greg Avery =

British animal rights activist

- Died: October 12, 2026
- Occupation: Animal Activist

Greg Avery was a British animal rights activist, convicted for offenses relating to his activism. He was involved with Stop Huntingdon Animal Cruelty (SHAC), an international campaign to force the closure of Huntingdon Life Sciences (HLS), an animal testing company based in the UK and US. Avery had several prison sentences and served time for assaulting a policeman.

== Early life ==
Avery was born and raised near Buxton in Derbyshire, one of six brothers. He joined the animal rights movement at the age of 15, and has devoted himself to it full-time ever since.

=== Arrests and convictions ===
On 1 May 2007, after a series of raids involving 700 police officers in England, Amsterdam, and Belgium, 32 people linked to SHAC were arrested, including Avery and Dellemagne, who were charged with conspiracy to blackmail in connection with the SHAC campaign.

He was also served with an indefinite ASBO, restricting his future contact with companies targeted in the campaign.

== See also ==
- Veganism
- List of animal rights advocates
