= Save the Newchurch Guinea Pigs =

Animal rights campaign in England

- Location: Newchurch, Staffordshire, England
- Caused by: Animal Welfare
- Goals: Closure of Darley Oaks Farm.
- Methods: Protest; Intimidation; Body snatching; Trespass
- Status: Ended
- Result: Darley Oaks Farm ceases the breeding of Guinea Pigs for medical research. Four activists jailed for conspiracy to blackmail.

Save the Newchurch Guinea Pigs (SNGP) was a six-year campaign by British animal rights activists to close a farm in Newchurch, Staffordshire that bred guinea pigs for animal research. The owners, three brothers trading as David Hall and Partners, announced in August 2005 that they were closing the business as a result of the pressure from activists, which included harassment, damage to property, and threats of physical violence.

Set up in 1999, the campaign became notorious in October 2004 when the remains of Christopher Hall's mother-in-law were removed from her grave in St Peter's churchyard, Yoxall, an act condemned by several animal rights groups, including Save the Newchurch Guinea Pigs itself. The BBC and Burton Mail newspaper received correspondence in April 2005 signed the Animal Rights Militia claiming responsibility.

The remains were recovered in May 2006 when police searched woodland after receiving information from an activist they had arrested. Prosecutors were unable to prove that the disturbance of the grave was linked to the campaign, but four activists were jailed for conspiracy to blackmail, after admitting using the removal of the remains to put pressure on the Halls.

== Background ==
Save the Newchurch Guinea Pigs (SNGP) was started in 1999 after an Animal Liberation Front raid on the farm, during which 600 guinea pigs were removed. Video footage of the farm showed dirty, barren, crowded conditions inside the breeding sheds, as well as unhealthy and dying guinea pigs.

== The campaign ==
Regular demonstrations took place on the roadside near the farm. The campaign published the contact details of people connected to the farm, from the owners and their family to the businesses that traded with them, and the local public houses that the Hall family frequented. Campaigners were urged to contact anyone associated with the farm, however loosely, and pressure them to end the relationship, a tactic known as secondary and tertiary targeting.

The targets received thousands of profane, threatening and insulting telephone calls, emails and letters, including false allegations of rape. Their dustbins were knocked, fireworks were let off near the house in the middle of the night, and graffiti was sprayed on their property and around the village. Police logged over 450 separate criminal acts over a two-year period.

=== Removal of remains ===
In October 2004, the remains of Christopher Hall's mother-in-law, Gladys Hammond, were taken from her grave in St Peter's churchyard, Yoxall. Several animal liberation groups, including SPEAK and the Newchurch campaign itself, publicly condemned the desecration. Six months later, in April 2005, the BBC and a local newspaper, the Burton Mail, received anonymous correspondence claiming responsibility, signed by the Animal Rights Militia, a banner used by activists willing to carry out acts of physical violence. In March 2005, on the BBC's Crimewatch programme, Staffordshire police asked the authors of anonymous letters sent to the Halls to prove they had the body. As soon as the programme ended, Smith drove Ablewhite and Whitburn to Brakenhurst Wood, close to Darley Oaks farm. Police were tailing them. They stopped them early in the morning and found a collapsible spade, head torch, balaclava and camouflage clothing in the car. On a mobile phone at Smith's home, they found a text message sent that morning. It read: "Flies hoverin [sic], cld be a while". Police raided the homes of Ablewhite, 36, Smith, 39, Whitburn, 36, and Mayo, 38, in the West Midlands and Manchester. They found mobile phone and computer records which proved their part in the campaign.

In August 2005, the Hall family announced the farm would close and expressed hope that "the decision would prompt the return of [Hammond's] body."

=== Criminal convictions ===
==== Conspiracy to blackmail ====
Kerry Whitburn of Edgbaston, John Smith of Wolverhampton, John Ablewhite of Manchester, and Josephine Mayo of Staffordshire, members of the Save the Newchurch Guinea Pigs campaign group, pleaded guilty at Nottingham Crown Court to charges of conspiracy to blackmail. A Crown Prosecution Service spokesman said the prosecution could not prove the four had taken Gladys Hammond's remains, but they had admitted using the desecration to put pressure on the family.

On 2 May 2006, Staffordshire police, acting on information provided by Smith, searched woodland near a German war cemetery at Cannock Chase, near Hednesford, and recovered Hammond's remains. The four were sentenced on 11 May 2006, Ablewhite, Whitburn, and Smith to 12 years each, and Mayo to four years. While sentencing them, the judge said that they had also threatened to desecrate the grave of the husband of the Hall family's cleaner.

==== Intimidation ====
On 22 September 2006, John Smith's girlfriend, Madeline Buckler, was sentenced to two years in jail for "intimidation of people connected with an animal research organisation," a charge introduced under the Serious and Organised Crime Act 2005. Buckler was found to have sent the Halls menacing letters in November 2005.

== See also ==
- Stop Huntingdon Animal Cruelty
- SPEAK
- Consort beagles
- Save the Hill Grove Cats
- Shamrock Farm
- Leaderless resistance
