= Animal Liberation Front =

Animal rights direct action organization

- Logo of the ALF formed around a circle-A, a symbol of the anarchist movement
- Abbreviation: ALF
- Formation: June 1976; 50 years ago
- Founded at: United Kingdom
- Purpose: Animal rights Reducing or making animal cruelty and exploitation disappear Fighting against the interests of companies, groups or people that would engage in those practices Spread of anarchism
- Location: Active in at least 40 countries+ (with a presence in the USA, UK, Sweden, Israel, etc)
- Origins: United Kingdom
- Method: Direct action Propaganda of the deed Creating support networks for people and animals Political propaganda under various forms
- Members: Unknown
- Affiliations: Anarchism

The Animal Liberation Front (ALF) is an anarchist international, leaderless, decentralized movement that emerged in Britain in the 1970s, evolving from the Bands of Mercy. It operates without a formal leadership structure and engages in direct actions aimed at opposing animal cruelty and exploitation.

These actions include removing animals from laboratories and farms, damaging facilities, providing veterinary care, and establishing sanctuaries for those animals. Participants describe their efforts as non-violent and compare their activities to a modern-day Underground Railroad. However, the ALF has also been criticized and labeled as an eco-terrorist organization by some groups and individuals.

Active in over 40 countries, the ALF operates through clandestine cells, often consisting of small groups or individuals. This decentralized and covert structure makes it challenging for authorities to monitor or infiltrate the organization. According to Robin Webb of the Animal Liberation Press Office, this structure is a key reason for the ALF's resistance, stating "That is why the ALF cannot be smashed; it cannot be effectively infiltrated, it cannot be stopped. You, each and every one of you: you are the ALF."

Activists associated with the ALF describe the movement as non-violent. According to the ALF's guidelines, actions that promote animal liberation and take all reasonable precautions to avoid harm to both human and nonhuman life can be attributed to the ALF, including acts of vandalism that may cause economic damage. In 2006, American activist Rod Coronado stated, "One thing that I know that separates us from the people we are constantly accused of being—that is, terrorists, violent criminals—is the fact that we have harmed no one."

There has nevertheless been widespread criticism for its alleged involvement in acts of violence and for the failure of some spokespersons and activists to condemn such actions. This criticism has led to dissent within the animal rights movement regarding the use of violence and has attracted increased attention from law enforcement and intelligence agencies. In 2002, the Southern Poverty Law Center (SPLC), an organization that monitors extremism in the United States, highlighted ALF's involvement in the Stop Huntingdon Animal Cruelty campaign, which the SPLC identified as employing terrorist tactics, although the SPLC later noted that the ALF had not caused any fatalities. In 2005, the ALF was listed in a United States Department of Homeland Security planning document as a domestic terrorist threat, prompting the allocation of resources to monitor the group. That same year, FBI deputy assistant director John Lewis described "ecoterrorism" and the "animal rights movement" as the number one domestic terrorism threat. In the United Kingdom, ALF activities are classified as examples of domestic extremism and were monitored by the National Extremism Tactical Coordination Unit, which was established in 2004 to oversee illegal animal rights activity.

== Origins ==
=== Band of Mercy ===
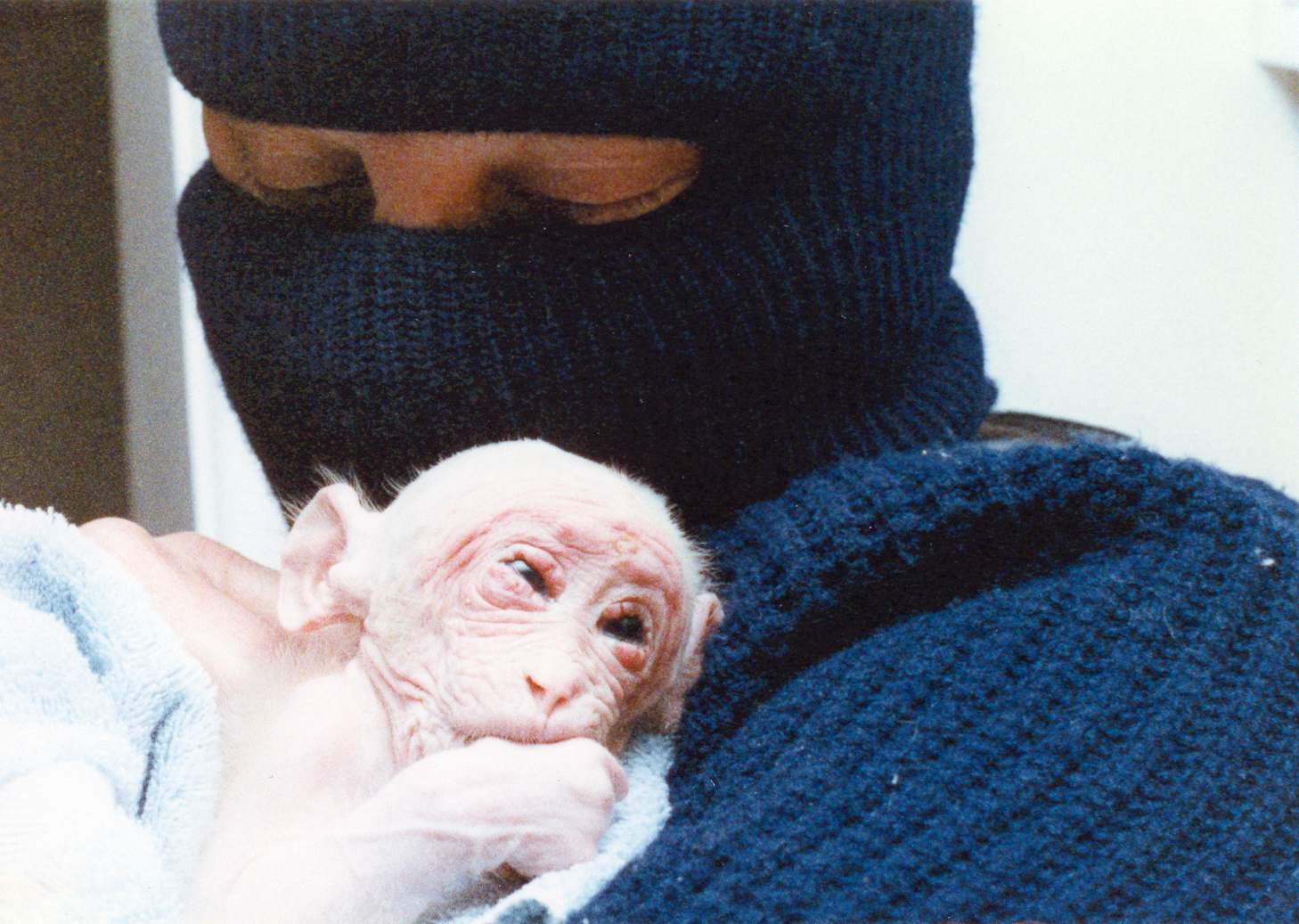
"Britches", a baby monkey removed from the University of California in March 1985 by the Animal Liberation Front

The origins of the ALF can be traced back to December 1963 when British journalist John Prestige attended a Devon and Somerset Staghounds event. During the event, Prestige witnessed the hunting and killing of a pregnant deer, an experience that prompted him to form the Hunt Saboteurs Association (HSA) in protest. The HSA initially consisted of volunteers who were trained to disrupt hunts by blowing horns and laying false scents to mislead the hounds.

According to animal rights writer Noel Molland, one of the groups within the HSA was established in 1971 by Ronnie Lee, a law student from Luton. In 1972, Lee, along with fellow activist Cliff Goodman, concluded that more militant tactics were necessary to further their cause. They decided to revive the name of a 19th-century RSPCA youth group, The Bands of Mercy, and formed a small group of about half a dozen activists known as the Band of Mercy. This group began targeting hunters' vehicles by slashing tires and breaking windows, aiming to prevent hunts from starting rather than disrupting them once underway.

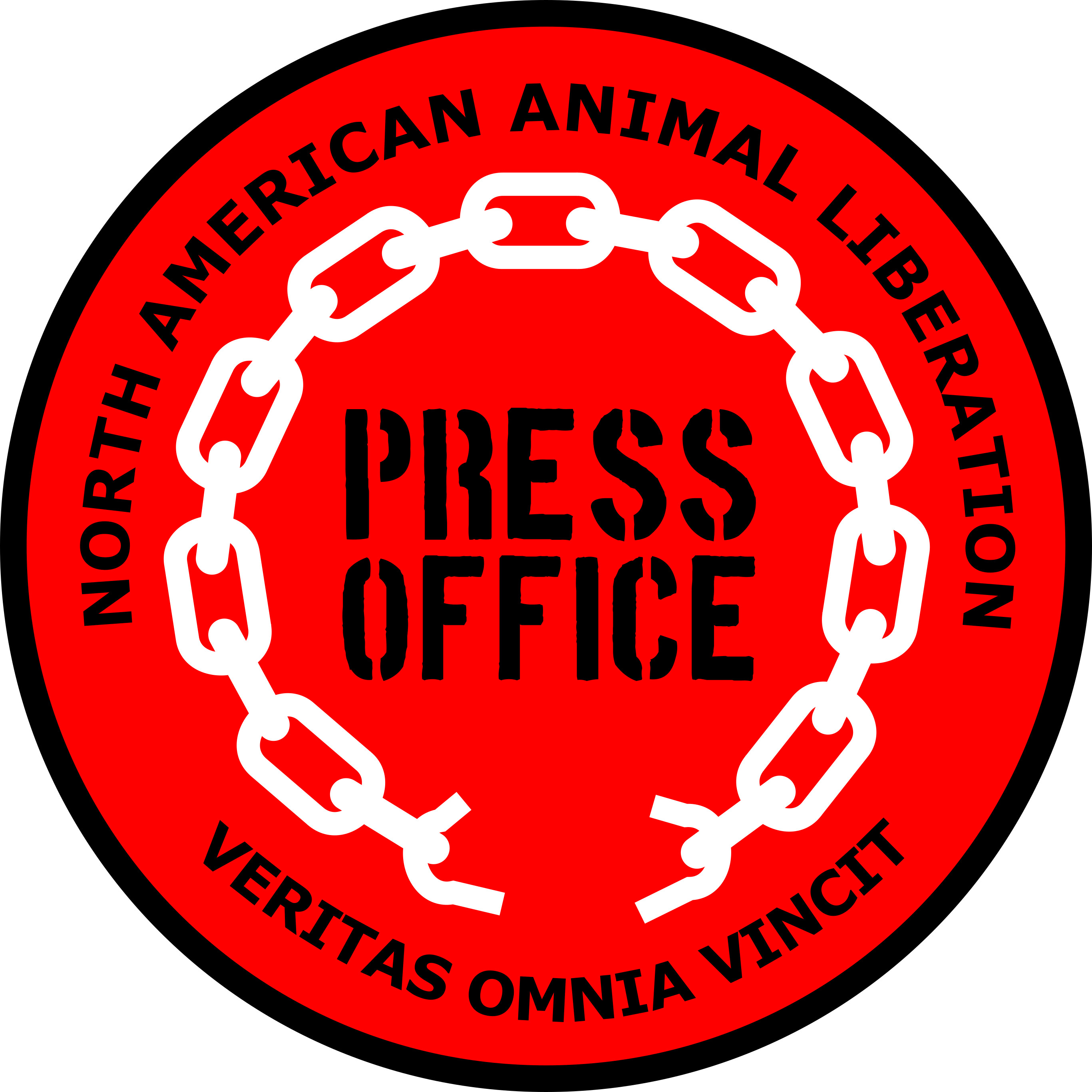
Official logo of the North American Animal Liberation Press Office, one of the groups of the ALF serving as a press office for several other groups or cells. The Latin script means "Truth always wins."

In 1973, the Band of Mercy became aware that Hoechst Pharmaceuticals was constructing a research laboratory in Milton Keynes. On 10 November 1973, two members of the group set fire to the building, resulting in £26,000 worth of damage. The activists returned six days later to ignite the remains of the structure. This incident marked the first known act of arson within the animal liberation movement. In June 1974, two members of the Band set fire to boats involved in the annual seal cull off the coast of Norfolk; according to Molland, this incident contributed to the cessation of the cull. Between June and August 1974, the Band carried out eight raids targeting animal-testing laboratories, as well as other actions against chicken breeders and gun shops, causing damage to buildings and vehicles. The group's first recorded act of "animal liberation" occurred during this period when activists removed half a dozen guinea pigs from a guinea pig farm in Wiltshire, leading the owner to close the business out of concern for further incidents.

The use of property damage as a tactic created a rift within the emerging animal rights movement. In July 1974, the Hunt Saboteurs Association publicly distanced itself from the Band of Mercy, offering a £250 reward for information leading to the identification of its members. The Association stated, "We approve of their ideals but are opposed to their methods," signaling disapproval of the Band's approach.

=== ALF formed ===
In August 1974, Ronnie Lee and Cliff Goodman were arrested for their involvement in a raid on the Oxford Laboratory Animal Colonies in Bicester, a case that earned them the moniker "Bicester Two". During their trial, daily demonstrations took place outside the court, with supporters including Lee's local Labour MP, Ivor Clemitson. Both Lee and Goodman were sentenced to three years in prison. While incarcerated, Lee initiated the movement's first hunger strike to secure access to vegan food and clothing. After serving 12 months, Lee was released on parole in the spring of 1976, emerging more militant than ever. He regrouped with the remaining Band of Mercy activists and recruited around two dozen new members, forming a group of approximately 30 individuals.

According to Molland, Lee felt that the name "Band of Mercy" no longer accurately reflected what he envisioned as a revolutionary movement. Seeking a name that would instill fear in those who exploited animals, Lee founded the Animal Liberation Front.

== Structure and aims ==
=== Links to the broader anarchist movement ===
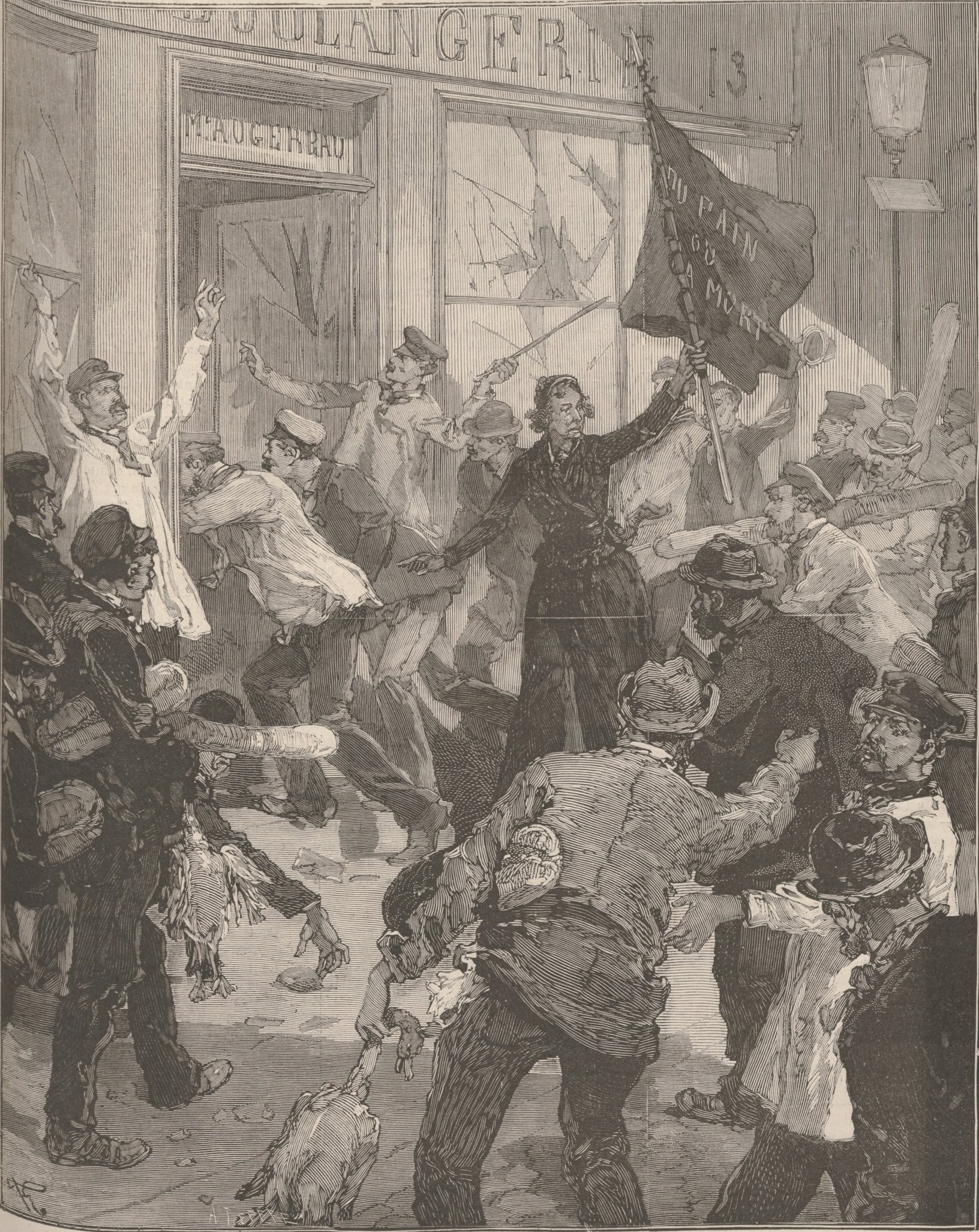
Louise Michel, a famous anarchist shocked and moved by the exploitation of animals, leading the protest where she used the anarchist black flag for the first time

The ALF is ideologically part of the Animal Liberation Movement (ALM), an ideological movement derived from the anarchist movement in the sense that it believes it is necessary to wage an anti-capitalist, anti-imperialist struggle and that the State is a fundamentally oppressive organism, incapable of carrying out reforms that would truly improve the situation of animals and of life, given that its very existence would significantly support animal exploitation.

The methods used by the ALF and the ideology it develops are thus part of the broader trajectory of the anarchist movement between the later half of the 20th and the first half of the 21st century. The professor of philosophy and ALF sympathizer, Steven Best, thus believes that the ALF can be fully described as an anarchist organization, both with respect to the methods used, the autonomous and leaderless organizational form chosen, the ideology defended but also by the symbols and legacy retaken by the ALF. Like other anarchists, they are also criminalized as terrorists, in their case as eco-terrorists.

=== Underground and above-ground ===
The Animal Liberation Front operates with both underground and above-ground components and is entirely decentralized with no formal hierarchy. This decentralized nature helps limit legal responsibility. Volunteers are expected to adhere to the ALF's stated objectives:

- To inflict economic damage on those who profit from the misery and exploitation of animals.
- To liberate animals from places of abuse, i.e. laboratories, factory farms, fur farms etc., and place them in good homes where they may live out their natural lives, free from suffering.
- To reveal the horror and atrocities committed against animals behind locked doors, by performing nonviolent direct actions and liberations
- To take all necessary precautions against harming any animal, human and non-human.
- Any group of people who are vegetarians or vegans and who carry out actions according to ALF guidelines have the right to regard themselves as part of the ALF.

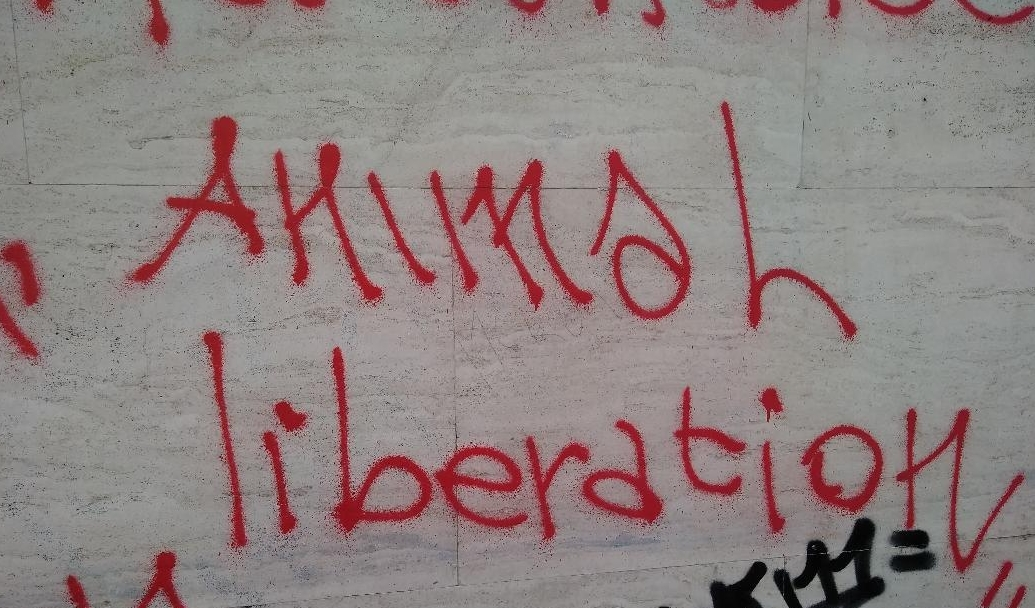
Animal liberationì, graffiti in Turin

Several above-ground organizations support the movement's covert activities. The Animal Liberation Front Supporters Group (ALF SG) provides support to activists in prison, who are recognized as prisoners of conscience, and allows membership through a monthly fee. The Vegan Prisoners Support Group, established in 1994, works with UK prison authorities to ensure that ALD prisoners have access to vegan supplies. The Animal Liberation Press Office collects and disseminates anonymous communiqués from volunteers; it operates as an ostensibly independent group funded by public donations, though the High Court in London ruled in 2006 that its press officer in the UK, Robin Webb, was a pivotal figure in the ALF.

There are three publications associated with the ALF. Arkangel was a British bi-annual magazine founded by Ronnie Lee. Bite Back is a website where activists leave claims of responsibility; it published a "Direct Action Report" in 2005 stating that, in 2004 alone, ALF activists had removed 17,262 animals from facilities and had claimed 554 acts of vandalism and arson. No Compromise is a US-based website that also reports on ALF actions.

=== Philosophy of direct action ===
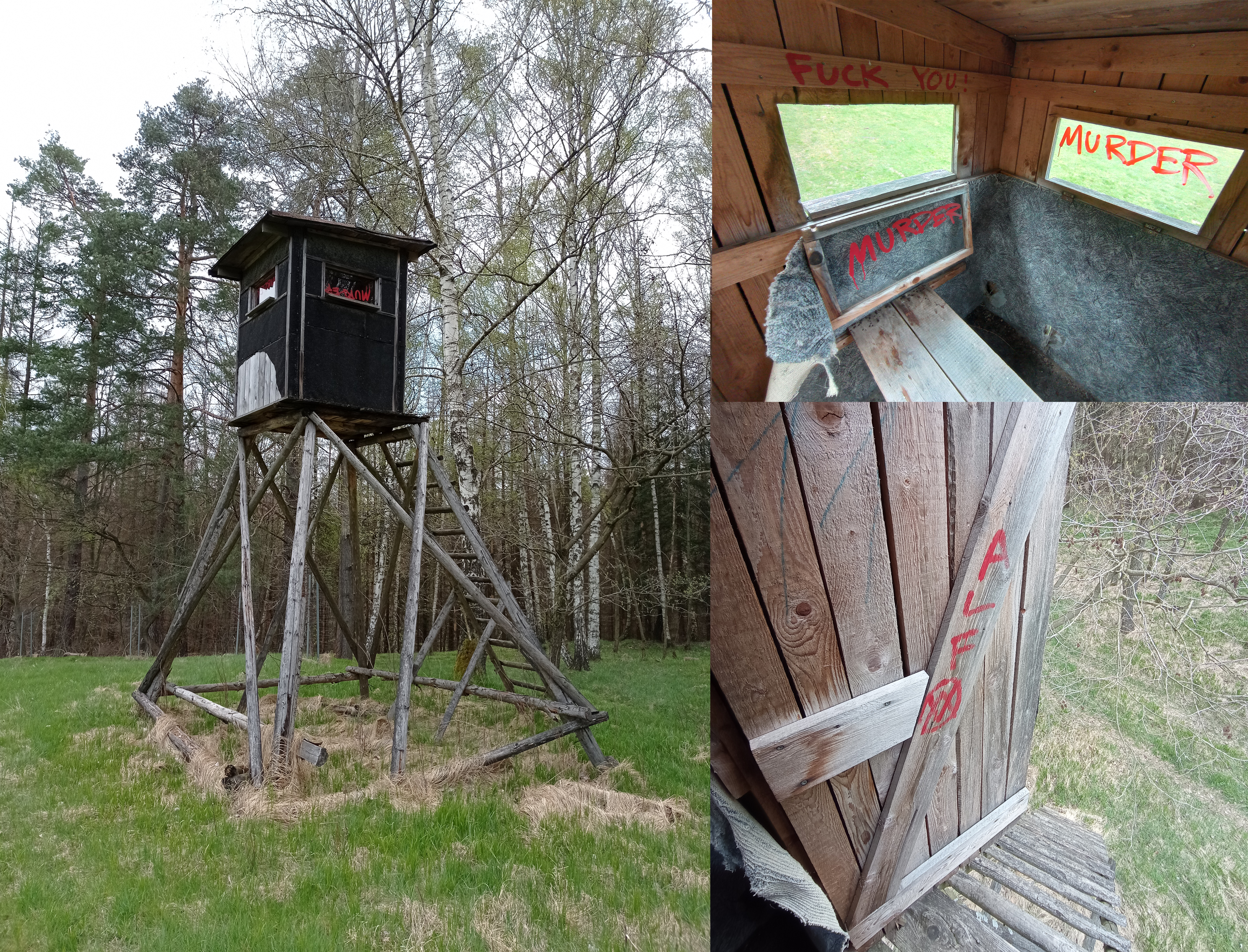
Deer blind vandalized by activists from ALF (Czech Republic, 2020)

ALF activists argue that animals should not be viewed as property and that scientists and industry have no right to assume ownership of living beings who are the "subjects-of-a-life," in the words of philosopher Tom Regan. In the view of the ALF, failing to recognize this is an example of speciesism—the ascription of different values to beings on the basis of their species membership alone, which they argue is as ethically flawed as racism or sexism. They reject the animal welfare position that more humane treatment is needed for animals; they say their aim is empty cages, not bigger ones. Activists argue that the animals they remove from laboratories or farms are "liberated", not "stolen", because they were never rightfully owned in the first place.

"Labs raided, locks glued, products spiked, depots ransacked, windows smashed, construction halted, mink set free, fences torn down, cabs burnt out, offices in flames, car tyres es slashed, cages emptied, phone lines severed, slogans daubed, muck spread, damage done, electrics cut, site flooded, hunt dogs stolen, fur coats slashed, buildings destroyed, foxes freed, kennels attacked, businesses burgled, uproar, anger, outrage, balaclava clad thugs. It's an ALF thing!" — Keith Mann

Although the ALF members reject violence against people, many activists support property crime, comparing the destruction of animal laboratories and other facilities to resistance fighters blowing up gas chambers in Nazi Germany. Their argument for sabotage is that the removal of animals from a laboratory simply means they will be quickly replaced, but if the laboratory itself is destroyed, it not only slows down the restocking process but increases costs, possibly to the point of making animal research prohibitively expensive; this, they argue, will encourage the search for alternatives. An ALF activist involved in an arson attack on the University of Arizona told No Compromise in 1996: "[I]t is much the same thing as the abolitionists who fought against slavery going in and burning down the quarters or tearing down the auction block ... Sometimes when you just take animals and do nothing else, perhaps that is not as strong a message."

Congressional hearing about the ALF in the USA (2005)

The provision against violence in the ALF code has triggered divisions within the movement and allegations of hypocrisy from the ALF's critics. In 1998, terrorism expert Paul Wilkinson called the ALF and its splinter groups "the most serious domestic terrorist threat within the United Kingdom." In 1993, ALF was listed as an organization that has "claimed to have perpetrated acts of extremism in the United States" in the Report to Congress on the Extent and Effects of Domestic and International Terrorism on Animal Enterprises. It was named as a terrorist threat by the U.S. Department of Homeland Security in January 2005. In March 2005, a speech from the Counterterrorism Division of the FBI stated that: "The eco-terrorist movement has given rise and notoriety to groups such as the Animal Liberation Front, or ALF, and the Earth Liberation Front (ELF). These groups exist to commit serious acts of vandalism, and to harass and intimidate owners and employees of the business sector." In hearings held on 18 May 2005, before a Senate panel, officials of the FBI and the Bureau of Alcohol, Tobacco, Firearms, and Explosives (ATF) stated that "violent animal rights extremists and eco-terrorists now pose one of the most serious terrorism threats to the nation." The use of the terrorist label has been criticized, however; the Southern Poverty Law Center, which tracks U.S. domestic extremism, writes that "for all the property damage they have wreaked, eco-radicals have killed no one." Philosopher and animal rights activist Steven Best writes that "given the enormity and magnitude of animal suffering ... one should notice that the ALF has demonstrated remarkable restraint in their war of liberation."

Best and trauma surgeon Jerry Vlasak, both of whom have volunteered for the North American press office, were banned from entering the UK in 2004 and 2005 after making statements that appeared to support violence against people. Vlasak told an animal rights conferences in 2003: "I don't think you'd have to kill—assassinate—too many vivisectors before you would see a marked decrease in the amount of vivisection going on. And I think for five lives, 10 lives, 15 human lives, we could save a million, two million, 10 million non-human animals." Best coined the term "extensional self-defence" to describe actions carried out in defense of animals by human beings acting as proxies. He argues that activists have the moral right to engage in acts of sabotage or even violence because animals are unable to fight back themselves. Best argues that the principle of extensional self-defense mirrors the penal code statues known as the necessity defense, which can be invoked when a defendant believes the illegal act was necessary to avoid imminent and great harm. Best argues that "extensional self defense" is not just a theory, but put into practice in some African countries, where hired armed soldiers occasionally use lethal force against poachers who would kill rhinos, elephants and other endangered animals for their body parts to be sold in international markets.

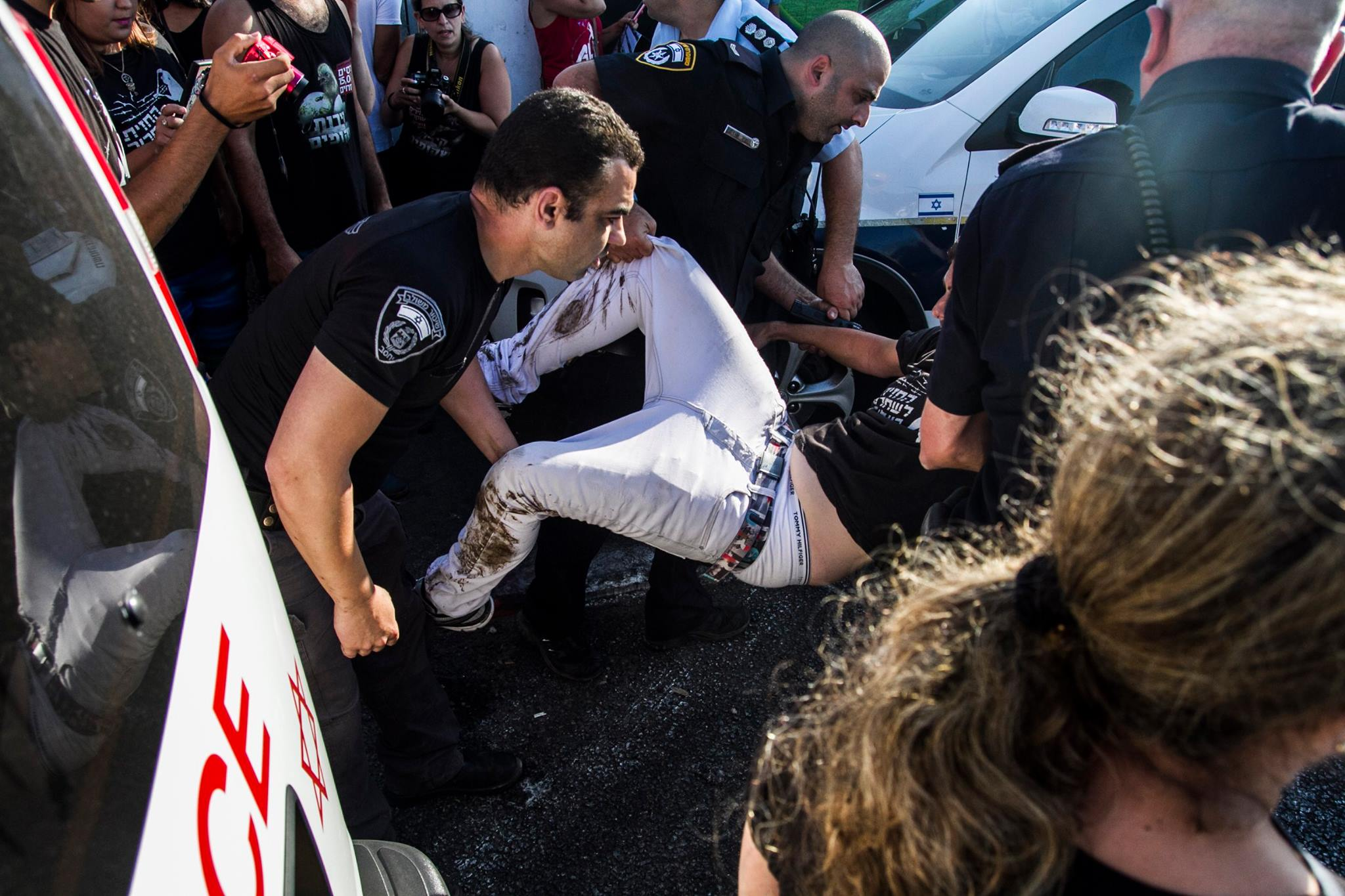
Israeli police confronting ALF militants (2016)

The nature of the ALF as a leaderless resistance means support for Vlasak and Best is hard to measure. An anonymous volunteer interviewed in 2005 for CBS's 60 Minutes said of Vlasak: "[H]e doesn't operate with our endorsement or our support or our appreciation, the support of the ALF. We have a strict code of non-violence ... I don't know who put Dr. Vlasak in the position he's in. It wasn't us, the ALF."

Philosopher Peter Singer of Princeton University has argued that ALF direct action can only be regarded as a just cause if it is non-violent, and that the ALF is at its most effective when uncovering evidence of animal abuse that other tactics could not expose. He cites 1984's "Unnecessary Fuss" campaign, when ALF raided the University of Pennsylvania's head-injury research clinic and removed footage showing researchers laughing at the brain damage of conscious baboons, as an example. The university responded that the treatment of the animals conformed to National Institutes of Health (NIH) guidelines, but as a result of the publicity, the lab was closed down, the chief veterinarian fired, and the university placed on probation. Barbara Orlans, a former animal researcher with the NIH, now with the Kennedy Institute of Ethics, writes that the case stunned the biomedical community, and is today considered one of the most significant cases in the ethics of using animals in research. Singer argues that if the ALF would focus on this kind of direct action, instead of sabotage, it would appeal to the minds of reasonable people. Against this, Steven Best writes that industries and governments have too much institutional and financial bias for reason to prevail.

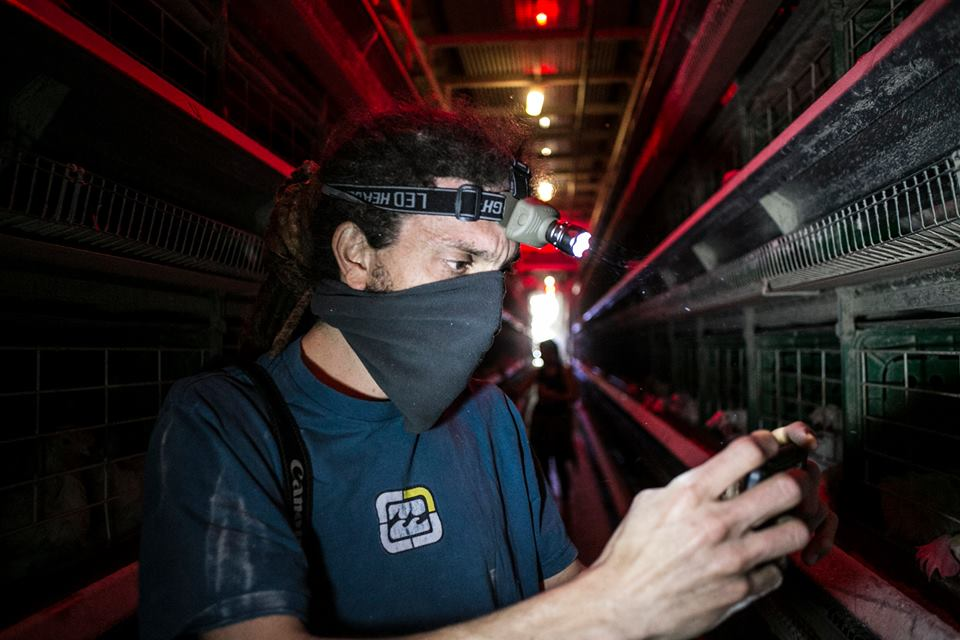
ALF member taking pictures of a chicken coop in Israel (2016)

Peter Hughes of the University of Sunderland cites a 1988 raid in the UK led by ALF activist Barry Horne as an example of positive ALF direct action. Horne and four other activists decided to free Rocky, a dolphin who had lived in a small concrete pool in Marineland in Morecambe for 20 years, by moving him 180 metres (590 ft) from his pool to the sea. The police spotted them carrying a homemade dolphin stretcher, and they were convicted of conspiracy to steal, but they continued to campaign for Rocky's release. Marineland eventually agreed to sell him for £120,000, money that was raised with the help of the Born Free Foundation and the Mail on Sunday, and in 1991 Rocky was transferred to an 80-acre (320,000 m^{2}) lagoon reserve in the Turks and Caicos Islands, then released. Hughes writes that the ALF action helped to create a paradigm shift in the UK toward seeing dolphins as "individual actors", as a result of which, he writes, there are now no captive dolphins in the UK.

== Early tactics and ideology ==
Rachel Monaghan of the University of Ulster writes that, in their first year of operation alone, ALF actions accounted for £250,000 worth of damage, targeting butcher shops, furriers, circuses, slaughterhouses, breeders, and fast-food restaurants. She writes that the ALF philosophy was that violence can only take place against sentient life forms, and therefore focusing on property destruction and the removal of animals from laboratories and farms was consistent with a philosophy of non-violence, despite the damage they were causing. In 1974, Ronnie Lee insisted that direct action be "limited only by reverence of life and hatred of violence", and in 1979, he wrote that many ALF raids had been called off because of the risk to life.

Kim Stallwood, a national organiser for the British Union for the Abolition of Vivisection (BUAV) in the 1980s, writes that the public's response to early ALF raids that removed animals was very positive, in large measure because of the non-violence policy. When Mike Huskisson removed three beagles from a tobacco study at ICI in June 1975, the media portrayed him as a hero. Robin Webb writes that ALF volunteers were viewed as the "Robin Hoods of the animal welfare world".

Stallwood writes that they saw ALF activism as part of their opposition to the state, rather than as an end-in-itself, and did not want to adhere to non-violence. In the early 1980s, the BUAV, an anti-vivisection group founded by Frances Power Cobbe in 1898, was among the ALF's supporters. Stallwood writes that it donated part of its office space rent-free to the ALF Supporters Group, and gave ALF actions uncritical support in its newspaper, The Liberator. In 1982, a group of ALF activists, including Roger Yates, now a sociologist at University College, Dublin, and Dave McColl, a director of Sea Shepherd Conservation Society, became members of the BUAV's executive committee, and used their position to radicalize the organization. Stallwood writes that the new executive believed all political action to be a waste of time and wanted the BUAV to devote its resources exclusively to direct action. Whereas the earliest activists had been committed to rescuing animals and destroyed property only where it contributed to the former, by the mid-1980s, Stallwood believed the ALF had lost its ethical foundation, and had become an opportunity "for misfits and misanthropes to seek personal revenge for some perceived social injustice". He writes: "Where was the intelligent debate about tactics and strategies that went beyond the mindless rhetoric and emotional elitism pervading much of the self-produced direct action literature? In short, what had happened to the animals' interests?" In 1984, the BUAV board reluctantly voted to expel the ALF SG from its premises and withdraw its political support, after which, Stallwood writes, the ALF became increasingly isolated.

=== Development of the ALF in the U.S. ===
There are conflicting accounts of when the ALF first emerged in the United States. The FBI writes that animal rights activists had a history of committing low-level criminal activity in the U.S. dating back to the 1970s. Freeman Wicklund and Kim Stallwood say that the first ALF action in the U.S. was on 29 May 1977, when researchers Ken LeVasseur and Steve Sipman released two dolphins, Puka and Kea, into the ocean from the University of Hawaii's Marine Mammal Laboratory. The North American Animal Liberation Press Office attributes the dolphin release to a group called Undersea Railroad, and says the first ALF action in the U.S. was, in fact, a raid on the New York University Medical Center on 14 March 1979, when activists removed one cat, two dogs, and two guinea pigs.

Kathy Snow Guillermo writes in Monkey Business that the first U.S. ALF action was the removal, on 22 September 1981, of the Silver Spring monkeys, 17 lab monkeys in the legal custody of People for the Ethical Treatment of Animals (PETA), after a researcher who had been experimenting on them was arrested for alleged violations of cruelty legislation. When the court ruled that the monkeys be returned to the researcher, they mysteriously disappeared, only to reappear five days later when PETA learned that legal action against the researcher could not proceed without the monkeys as evidence. Ingrid Newkirk, the president of PETA, writes that the first ALF cell was set up in late 1982, after a police officer she calls "Valerie" responded to the publicity triggered by the Silver Spring monkeys case, and flew to England to be trained by the ALF. Posing as a reporter, Valerie was put in touch with Ronnie Lee by Kim Stallwood, who at the time was working for the BUAV. Lee directed her to a training camp, where she was taught how to break into laboratories. Newkirk writes that Valerie returned to Maryland and set up an ALF cell, with the first raid taking place on 24 December 1982 against Howard University, where 24 cats were removed, some of whose back legs had been crippled. Jo Shoesmith, an American attorney and animal rights activist, says Newkirk's account of "Valerie" is not only fictionalized, as Newkirk acknowledges, but totally fictitious.

Two early ALF raids led to the closure of several university studies. A 28 May 1984 raid on the University of Pennsylvania's head injury clinic caused $60,000 worth of damage and saw the removal of 60 hours of tapes, which showed the researchers laughing as they used a hydraulic device to cause brain damage to baboons. The tapes were turned over to PETA, who produced a 26-minute video called Unnecessary Fuss. The head injury clinic was closed, the university's chief veterinarian was fired, and the university was put on probation.

On 20 April 1985, acting on a tip-off from a student, the ALF raided a laboratory in the University of California, Riverside, causing $700,000 in damages and removing 468 animals. These included Britches, a five-week-old macaque, who had been separated from his mother at birth and left alone with his eyes sewn shut and a sonar device on his head as part of a study into blindness. The raid, which was taped by the ALF, caused eight of the laboratory's seventeen active research projects to be shut down, and the university said years of medical research were lost. The raid prompted National Institutes of Health director James Wyngaarden to argue that the raids should be regarded as acts of terrorism.

=== Animal Rights Militia and Justice Department ===
Monaghan writes that, around 1982, there was a noticeable shift in the non-violent position, and not one approved by everyone in the movement. Some activists began to make personal threats against individuals, followed by letter bombs and threats to contaminate food, the latter representing yet another shift to threatening the general public, rather than specific targets.

In 1982, letter bombs were sent to all four major party leaders in the UK, including Prime Minister Margaret Thatcher. The first major food scare happened in November 1984, with the ALF claiming to the media that it had contaminated Mars Bars as part of a campaign to force the Mars company to stop conducting tooth decay tests on monkeys. On 17 November, the Sunday Mirror received a call from the ALF saying it had injected Mars Bars in stores throughout the country with rat poison. The call was followed by a letter containing a Mars Bar, presumed to be contaminated, and the claim that these were on sale in London, Leeds, York, Southampton, and Coventry. Millions of bars were removed from shelves and Mars halted production, at a cost to the company of $4.5 million. The ALF admitted the claims had been a hoax. Similar contamination claims were later made against L'Oréal and Lucozade.

The letter bombs were claimed by the Animal Rights Militia (ARM), although the initial statement in November 1984 by David Mellor, then a Home Office minister, stated that it was the Animal Liberation Front who had claimed responsibility. This is an early example of the shifting of responsibility from one banner to another depending on the nature of the act, with the ARM and another nom de guerre, the Justice Department—the latter first used in 1993—emerging as names for direct action that violated the ALF's "no harm to living beings" principle. Ronnie Lee, who had earlier insisted on the importance of the ALF's non-violence policy, seemed to support the idea. An article signed by RL—presumed to be Ronnie Lee—in the October 1984 ALF Supporters Group newsletter, suggested that activists set up "fresh groups ... under new names whose policies do not preclude the use of violence toward animal abusers".

No activist is known to have conducted operations under both the ALF and ARM banners, but overlap is assumed. Terrorism expert Paul Wilkinson has written that the ALF, the Justice Department, and the ARM are essentially the same thing, and Robert Garner of the University of Leicester writes that it would be pointless to argue otherwise, given the nature of the movement as a leaderless resistance. Robin Webb of the British Animal Liberation Press Office has acknowledged that the activists may be the same people: "If someone wishes to act as the Animal Rights Militia or the Justice Department, simply put, the ... policy of the Animal Liberation Front, to take all reasonable precautions not to endanger life, no longer applies."

From 1983 onwards, a series of fire bombs exploded in department stores that sold fur, with the intention of triggering the sprinkler systems in order to cause damage, although several stores were partly or completely destroyed. In September 1985, incendiary devices were placed under the cars of Sharat Gangoli and Stuart Walker, both animal researchers with the British Industrial Biological Research Association (BIBRA), wrecking both vehicles but with no injuries, and the ARM claimed responsibility. In January 1986, the ARM said it had placed devices under the cars of four employees of Huntingdon Life Sciences, timed to explode an hour apart from each other. A further device was placed under the car of Andor Sebesteny, a researcher for the Imperial Cancer Research Fund, which he spotted before it exploded. The next major attacks on individual researchers took place in 1990, when the cars of two veterinary researchers were destroyed by sophisticated explosive devices in two separate explosions. In February 1989, an explosion damaged the Senate House bar in Bristol University, an attack claimed by the unknown "Animal Abused Society". In June 1990, two days apart, bombs exploded in the cars of Margaret Baskerville, a veterinary surgeon working at Porton Down, a chemical research defence establishment, and Patrick Max Headley, a physiologist at Bristol University. Baskerville escaped without injury by jumping through the window of her mini-jeep when a bomb using a mercury-tilt device exploded next to the fuel tank. During the attack on Headley—which New Scientist writes involved the use of plastic explosives—a 13-month-old baby in a push-chair suffered flash burns, shrapnel wounds, and a partially severed finger. A wave of letter bombs followed in 1993, one of which was opened by the head of the Hereford site of GlaxoSmithKline, causing burns to his hands and face. Eleven similar devices were intercepted in postal sorting offices.

=== False flags and plausible deniability ===
The nature of the ALF exposes its name to the risk of being used by activists who reject its non-violence platform, or by opponents conducting so-called "false-flag" operations, designed to make the ALF appear violent. That same uncertainty provides genuine ALF activists with plausible deniability should an operation go wrong, by denying that the act was "authentically ALF".

Several of the incidents in 1989 and 1990 were described by the movement as false flag operations. No known entity claimed responsibility for the attacks, which were condemned within the animal rights movement and by ALF activists. Keith Mann writes that it did not seem plausible that activists known for making simple incendiary devices from household components would suddenly switch to mercury-tilt switches and plastic explosives, then never be heard from again. A few days after the bombings, the unknown "British Animal Rights Society" claimed responsibility for attaching a nail bomb to a Huntsman's Land Rover in Somerset. Forensic evidence led police to arrest the owner of the vehicle, who admitted he had bombed his own car to discredit the animal rights movement and asked for two similar offences to be taken into consideration. He was jailed for nine months. The Baskerville and Headley bombers were never apprehended.

In 2018 the London Metropolitan Police apologised for the activities of one of their undercover agents who had infiltrated the group. A police officer using the name "Christine Green" had been involved in the illegal release of a large number of mink from a farm in Ringwood in 1998. The mission had been approved by senior officers in the police.

== 1996–present ==
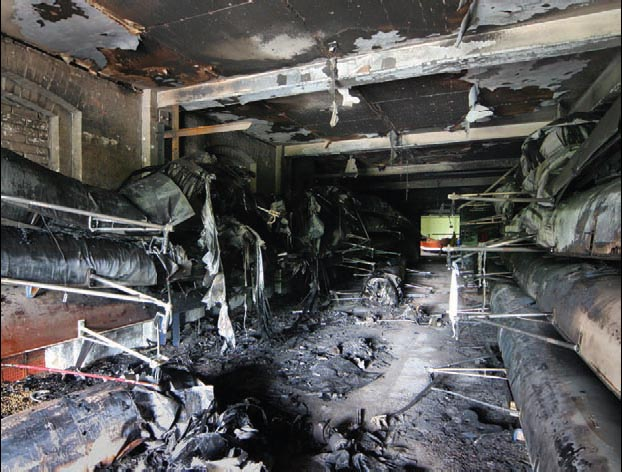
View of the devastation from the fire that caused £500,000 damage to Londbridges boathouse, Oxfordshire on 4 July 2005

Property destruction began to increase substantially after several high-profile campaigns closed down facilities perceived to be abusive to animals. Consort Kennels, a facility breeding beagles for animal testing; Hillgrove Farm, which bred cats; and Newchurch Farm, which bred guinea pigs, were all closed after being targeted by animal rights campaigns that appeared to involve the ALF. In the UK, the financial year 1991–1992 saw around 100 refrigerated meat trucks destroyed by incendiary devices at a cost of around £5 million. Butchers' locks were superglued, shrink-wrapped meats were pierced in supermarkets, slaughterhouses and refrigerated meat trucks were set on fire.

In 1999, ALF activists became involved in the international Stop Huntingdon Animal Cruelty (SHAC) campaign to close Huntingdon Life Sciences (HLS), Europe's largest animal-testing laboratory. The Southern Poverty Law Center, which monitors U.S. domestic extremism, has described SHAC's modus operandi as "frankly terroristic tactics similar to those of anti-abortion extremists". ALF activist Donald Currie was jailed for 12 years and placed on probation for life in December 2006 after being found guilty of planting homemade bombs on the doorsteps of businessmen with links to HLS. HLS director Brian Cass was attacked by men wielding pick-axe handles in February 2001. David Blenkinsop was one of those convicted of the attack, someone who in the past had conducted actions in the name of the ALF.

Also in 1999, a freelance reporter, Graham Hall, said he had been attacked after producing a documentary critical of the ALF, which was aired on Channel 4. The documentary showed ALF press officer Robin Webb appearing to give Hall—who was filming undercover while purporting to be an activist—advice about how to make an improvised explosive device, though Webb said his comments had been used out of context. Hall said that, as a result of the documentary, he was abducted, tied to a chair, and had the letters "ALF" branded on his back, before being released 12 hours later with a warning not to tell the police.

In June 2006, members of the ALF claimed responsibility for a firebomb attack on UCLA researcher Lynn Fairbanks, after a firebomb was placed on the doorstep of a house occupied by her 70-year-old tenant; according to the FBI, it was powerful enough to have killed the occupants, but failed to ignite. The attack was credited by the acting chancellor of UCLA as helping to shape the Animal Enterprise Terrorism Act. Animal liberation press officer Jerry Vlasak said of the attack: "force is a poor second choice, but if that's the only thing that will work ... there's certainly moral justification for that." As of 2008, activists were increasingly taking protests to the homes of researchers, staging "home demonstrations", which can involve making noise during the night, writing slogans on the researchers' property, smashing windows and spreading rumours to neighbours.

=== Operation Backfire ===
On 20 January 2006, as part of Operation Backfire, the U.S. Department of Justice announced charges against nine Americans and two Canadian activists calling themselves the "family". At least 9 of the 11 pleaded guilty to conspiracy and arson for their parts in a string of 20 arsons from 1996 through 2001, damage totalled $40 million. The Department of Justice called the acts examples of domestic terrorism. The incidents included arson attacks against meat-processing plants, lumber companies, a high-tension power line, and a ski centre, in Oregon, Wyoming, Washington, California and Colorado between 1996 and 2001.

== See also ==
- Animal rights and punk subculture
- Critical animal studies
- Deep ecology
- Direct Action Everywhere
- Earth Liberation Front
- GANDALF trial
- Green anarchism
- Informal Anarchist Federation
- Open rescue
- PETA
- Revolutionary Cells – Animal Liberation Brigade
- Total liberationism
