= Save the Hill Grove Cats =

British animal rights campaign

Save the Hill Grove Cats was a British animal rights campaign set up in 1997 with the aim of closing Hill Grove Farm near Witney in Oxfordshire. The farm, owned by Christopher Brown, was the last commercial breeder of cats for laboratories in the United Kingdom. Eight hundred cats were removed by the RSPCA on August 10, 1999, when Brown announced his decision to retire after a controversial two-year campaign.

== Background ==
Hill Grove was one of 3,326 designated establishments for breeding and animal experimentation in the UK; 1,124 cats were used in experiments in the UK in 1998.

At least 350 people were arrested and 21 jailed for public order offences over the course of the campaign. Policing costs rose to £2.8m and a five-mile exclusion zone was put in place around the farm.

The closure of the farm was regarded as highly significant in the UK, as an example of what is viewed — both by animal rights activists and by the British government — as the increasing influence and determination of the animal rights movement. The same group of activists chose as its next target Huntingdon Life Sciences, a contract animal-testing company in Cambridge, England, and New Jersey in the U.S., forming Stop Huntingdon Animal Cruelty, a campaign that has since become international.

== Controversy ==
The campaign was controversial, and included acts and threats of violence against Christopher Brown. In 1993, he suffered burns to his face and stomach when a letter bomb exploded. In 1998, he was sent a hoax bomb by the "Provisional ALF," together with a warning that a real one would follow. The threats were condemned by the Save the Hill Grove Cats campaign. A spokesperson, Heather James, told reporters: "We can't condone this. We are against violence towards animals and people."

In December 1998, Christopher Brown was added to a list of people involved in animal testing who would be assassinated by the Animal Rights Militia if Barry Horne, an animal rights activist on hunger strike, should die.

There were also allegations of violence against the activists. Protesters alleged that farm workers had poisoned them with an organophosphate pesticide spray. Environmental health officers confirmed that they found "substantial amounts" of dimethoate, described by the Independent as a potentially lethal pesticide, on a roadside verge where protesters often stood. Sixteen activists complained of nausea, sore throats, headaches, and difficulty breathing. Christopher Brown said that he had not sprayed the verge and that his farm did not use dimethoate.

== See also ==
- Camp Beagle
- Consort beagles campaign
- Save the Newchurch Guinea Pigs
- Stop Huntingdon Animal Cruelty
- Shamrock Farm
- Leaderless resistance
