= Stop Huntingdon Animal Cruelty =

Animal rights campaign

- Purpose: Animal-rights campaign to close Huntingdon Life Sciences. Opposition to animal testing.
- Location(s): UK and US
- Origins: England

Stop Huntingdon Animal Cruelty (SHAC) was an international animal rights campaign to close down Huntingdon Life Sciences (HLS), Europe's largest contract animal-testing laboratory. HLS tested medical and non-medical substances on around 75,000 animals every year, from rats to primates. It had been the subject of several major leaks or undercover investigations by activists and reporters since 1989.

SHAC was started by three British animal rights activists—Greg Avery, Heather James, and Natasha Dellemagne—after video footage supposed to have been shot covertly inside HLS in 1997 by People for the Ethical Treatment of Animals (PETA) showed HLS staff shaking, punching, and shouting at beagles in their care. The footage was broadcast by Channel 4 in the UK, the employees were dismissed and prosecuted, and HLS's licence to perform animal experiments was revoked for six months. PETA stopped its protests against the company after HLS threatened it with legal action, and SHAC took over as a leaderless resistance.

The campaign used tactics ranging from protests and civil disobedience to the firebombing of private property connected with HLS' clients and investors. The Southern Poverty Law Center (SPLC), which monitors US domestic extremism, has described SHAC's modus operandi as "frankly terroristic tactics similar to those of anti-abortion extremists," and in 2005 an official with the FBI's counter-terrorism division referred to SHAC's activities in the United States as domestic terrorist threats.

In 2009 and 2010, 13 members of SHAC, including Avery, James, and Dellemagne, were jailed for between 15 months and eleven years on charges of conspiracy to blackmail or harm HLS and its suppliers.

== Background ==
HLS tests household cleaners, pesticides, weedkillers, food additives, chemicals for use in industry, and drugs for use against Alzheimer's, Parkinson's, diabetes, multiple sclerosis, and cancer. It kills around 75,000 animals every year, including rats, rabbits, pigs, dogs, and primates (marmosets and macaques).

The company has been the subject of several undercover investigations since 1989. Sarah Kite of the British Union for the Abolition of Vivisection (BUAV) secured a job and filmed inside HLS in 1989. Zoe Broughton did the same for Channel 4 in 1996, as Michelle Rokke claimed to have done for PETA in 1997. Lucy Johnston for The Daily Express gained access in 2000. A diary kept by Kite, who worked undercover there for eight months, alleged that HLS workers routinely mishandled the animals, shouting at them, throwing them into their cages, and mocking them for having fits in response to toxicity tests. In 1997, Zoe Broughton came out with footage showing puppies being hit and shaken. A year later, Michelle Rokke allegedly obtained footage of the vivisection of a monkey in HLS in New Jersey, in which a technician expresses concern that the animal is inadequately anaesthetized. Between 2006 and 2008, an Animal Defenders International employee filmed undercover inside HLS after securing a position inside its primate toxicology unit in Cambridgeshire.

According to Mark Matfield of the Research Defence Society, a pro-animal testing lobby group in the UK, HLS lost a great deal of business after these investigations, primarily among the pharmaceutical industry. "There was an ingrained feeling among scientists and business people that this company had transgressed in a very serious way," he said.

== Structure ==
=== SHAC UK ===
SHAC was founded in November 1999 by Greg Avery; his second wife, Natasha Avery (née Dellemagne); and his first wife, Heather Nicholson (née James). Avery and Nicholson had been involved in previous high-profile campaigns against facilities in the UK that bred animals for laboratories. In 1997, after a ten-month campaign, they caused the closure of Consort Kennels, which bred beagles for animal research. Later that year, they started Save the Hill Grove Cats against Hill Grove farm in Oxfordshire, which bred cats for laboratories. The farm closed after two years.

They would meet every three months to receive updates from colleagues in the United States and Europe. Sarah Whitehead, an experienced campaigner known in the group as "Mumsy", would lead younger members and carry out up to five attacks in a night, according to the judge.

=== Methods ===
==== Secondary and tertiary targeting ====
SHAC's modus operandi is known as secondary and tertiary targeting. Activists engage in direct action—ranging from lawful protests to intimidation, harassment, and violent attacks—not only against HLS, its employees, and its employees' families, but also against secondary and tertiary targets such as HLS's business partners, and their business partners, insurers, caterers, cleaners, children's nursery schools, and office suppliers. A New York yacht club, for example, was covered in red paint because members of the club worked for Carr Securities, which traded in HLS shares. The campaign drove down HLS's profits, suppressed its share price, and made it difficult to find business and financial partners.

In 2001, HLS managing director in the UK, Brian Cass, was beaten outside his home by three masked men – animal rights activist David Blenkinsop was sentenced to three years in prison for the attack – and HLS marketing director Andrew Gay was attacked on his doorstep with a chemical spray to his eyes that left him temporarily blinded.

==== Shareholders ====
On 21 December 2000, HLS was dropped from the New York Stock Exchange because its market capitalization had fallen below NYSE limits, and on 29 March 2001, HLS lost both of its market makers and its place on the London Stock Exchange. Shortly after this, HLS moved its headquarters to the United States, incorporating as Life Sciences Research (LSR), and secured a $15m loan from investment bank Stephens, Inc, its largest shareholder. In September 2005, after the firebombing of the homes of a Canadian brokerage employee and a British pharmaceutical executive, the New York Stock Exchange asked LSR to delay moving its listing from the OTC Bulletin Board to the main exchange. LSR has since transferred its listing to the NYSE Arca electronic exchange. HLS is no longer a publicly traded company after being bought by CEO Andrew Baker.

In June 2005, Vancouver-based brokerage Canaccord Capital announced that it had dropped a client, Phytopharm PLC, in response to the May 2005 Animal Liberation Front (ALF) firebombing of a car belonging to Canaccord executive Michael Kendall. The ALF stated on its website that activists placed an incendiary device under the car, which was in Kendall's garage at home when it caught fire during the night. Kendall and his family went into hiding. Phytopharm was targeted, as were those doing business with it, because it had business links with HLS.

In May 2006, an anonymous group said it would be writing to every one of GlaxoSmithKline's 170,000 small investors warning them to sell their shares. The letters began arriving at investors' home addresses on 7 May 2006, asking that shares be sold within 14 days, and that the group be informed of the sale by e-mail via a Hotmail address. The number of letters sent was smaller than claimed; the BBC said at least 50 shareholders received the warning. Writing in The Sunday Telegraph the following week, British Prime Minister Tony Blair expressed support for animal experimentation in the face of an "appalling ... campaign of intimidation."

=== Ties to the ALF ===
Kevin Kjonaas – who took charge of SHAC UK while the Averys and James were jailed for six months in 2002 – declared his support for the ALF, and Robin Webb, spokesman for the ALF in the UK, attended and addressed SHAC conferences in the United States.

In 2006 the ALF warned that it was targeting HLS suppliers, and that year firebombed a car belonging to the finance director of Canaccord Capital, a brokerage firm. Members of SHAC said the company had acted as brokers for Phytopharm, which had used HLS for contract testing.

The FBI linked SHAC with attacks claimed by the militant animal rights group, the Animal Liberation Brigade. They issued an arrest warrant for Daniel Andreas San Diego, who they described as being "involved with the Stop Huntington Animal Cruelty campaign", in connection with bomb attacks against two of HLS's clients in California. San Diego was added to the FBI Most Wanted Terrorists List in 2009.

== Convictions and legislation ==
SHAC's campaign prompted the introduction of sections 145–149 of the British Serious Organised Crime and Police Act 2005, which created new offences intended to protect animal-testing facilities, including prohibiting acts or threats intended to cause someone to terminate or not enter into a contract with such a facility. The first person to be convicted under the Act was Joseph Harris, a doctor of molecular biology, who attacked property owned by companies supplying materials to HLS; he received a three-year sentence. In February 2007, a number of SHAC supporters were charged with illegal street collecting without a licence. According to the Metropolitan Police, two stalls in London's Oxford Street collected over £80,000 a year. In March 2007, three activists were jailed under the Act for intimidating HLS suppliers; one supplier dropped its contract with HLS after being invaded by demonstrators wearing skull masks.

=== 2006: SHAC 7 (U.S.) ===
Logo of the SHAC 7 Support Group

In March 2006, a federal jury in Trenton, New Jersey, found six members of SHAC guilty of using their website to incite attacks on those who did business with HLS. Originally, seven individuals (the SHAC 7) were charged: Kevin Kjonaas (also known as Kevin Jonas, former president of Stop Huntingdon Animal Cruelty USA), Lauren Gazzola, Jacob Conroy, Joshua Harper, Andrew Stepanian, Darius Fullmer, and John McGee. McGee was later dropped from the case. They were charged with conspiracy to violate the Animal Enterprise Terrorism Act, in the first application of the 1992 statute. Jonas, Gazzola, Conroy, and Harper were charged with conspiracy to harass using a telecommunications device (discussing black faxes), while Jonas, Gazzola, Conroy, and SHAC USA were charged with stalking via the internet. The defence of the SHAC 7 rested largely on the 1969 case Brandenburg v. Ohio, in which the Supreme Court of the United States ruled that political speech is legal unless it can be shown that a defendant incited others to commit imminent unlawful acts of violence. During the trial, the defendants were prohibited from providing evidence of animal cruelty taking place at Huntingdon Life Sciences testing laboratories.

In 2011, NPR reported that Andrew Stepanian of the SHAC 7—since released—had been imprisoned in the highly restrictive Communication Management Unit of the U.S. federal prison system.

In 2019 Joaquin Phoenix produced 'The Animal People'; a documentary about the SHAC 7 defendants.

=== 2007: Operation Achilles (UK) ===
On 1 May 2007, a series of raids—Operation Achilles—took place against SHAC in Europe, involving 700 police officers in England, Amsterdam, and Belgium. Thirty-two people were arrested, including Greg and Natasha Avery, and Heather Nicholson, who were charged with blackmail, along with nine others. Prosecutors told jurors that a 2007 meeting between the defendants had been bugged by police, and revealed that SHAC supported illegal acts that were traced to attacks on people across Great Britain. The prosecution also alleged there was evidence of direct email links between SHAC, the Animal Liberation Front, and Animal Rights Militia. Der Spiegel wrote that as a result of the police operation the number of attacks on HLS and associated businesses declined drastically, although the day after the convictions new posts on SHAC's website indicated that the campaign would continue.

== See also ==
- Animal rights and punk subculture
- List of animal rights groups
