= Tipu Aziz =

Bangladeshi-born British professor of neurosurgery (1956–2024)

Tipu Aziz FMedSci
- টিপু আজিজ জাহেদ
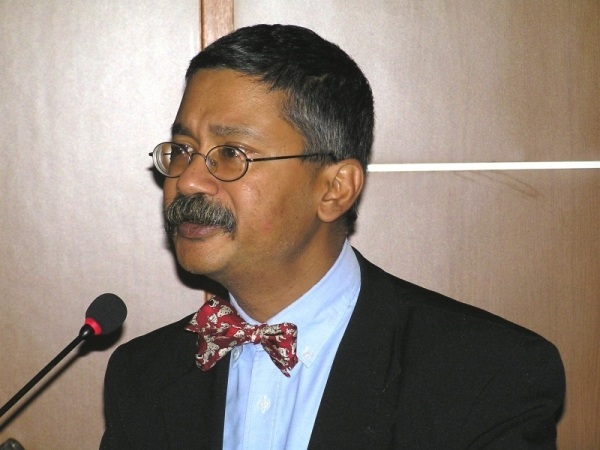
- Aziz in 2004
- Born: Tipu Zahed Aziz; 9 November 1956; Bangladesh
- Died: 25 October 2024 (aged 67)
- Citizenship: British
- Education: University College London; Manchester University
- Occupation: Professor of neurosurgery
- Years active: 1970s–2024
- Employer: John Radcliffe Hospital

Tipu Zahed Aziz (Bengali: টিপু আজিজ জাহেদ; 9 November 1956 – 25 October 2024) was a Bangladeshi-born British professor of neurosurgery at the John Radcliffe Hospital in Oxford, Aarhus Denmark and Porto, Portugal. He specialised in the study and treatment of Parkinson's disease, multiple sclerosis, dystonia, spasmodic torticollis, fixed abnormal posture of the neck, tremor, and intractable neuropathic pain. Besides his medical work, he was also notable as a public commentator in support of animal experimentation.

== Early life and education ==
Aziz was born in Bangladesh into what The Guardian called a "medical dynasty". He arrived in Britain at the age of 17 with just three O-levels, but after passing A-levels, he studied Neurophysiology at University College London, where he became interested in deep brain stimulation. He went on to study for a doctorate at Manchester University, where he began his research on animals.

== Career ==
In February 2006, Aziz came to public prominence in the UK when he spoke out in favour of the use of animals in medical research to several hundred demonstrators during a rally held by Pro-Test, a new British group set up to promote the construction by Oxford University of a new biomedical centre in which research on animals, including primates, will be conducted. Aziz was one of two Oxford neurosurgeons who sat on the Pro-Test committee. Pro-Test was formed to counter SPEAK, an animal rights organisation aiming to end vivisection in the UK.

In March 2006, he came to public attention again when he defended the use of animals in cosmetics testing, which is banned in Britain. His comments were described as "perhaps unfortunate" by one colleague.

=== Research interests ===
Aziz's work involved inducing Parkinsonian symptoms in monkeys, either surgically or using drugs, then switching off the symptoms using electrodes he has implanted in their brains.

During development of his techniques he used around 30 monkeys in tests over 20 years, and many believe that as many as 40,000 people around the world have benefitted from the techniques.

The Guardian writes that some patients have described the surgery as "miraculous". In a 2006 BBC Two documentary Monkeys, Rats and Me: Animal Testing, animal rights philosopher Peter Singer described Aziz's research as "justifiable" on utilitarian grounds. Singer later clarified his statement saying that it would only be justified, in his opinion, if Aziz were willing to do the same experiments on humans of a similar mental capacity.

Aziz said that the emphasis of his future research would be upon viral, gene, and stem cell therapy to treat Parkinson's and similar movement disorders.

=== Research criticism ===
According to The Oxford Student, Malcolm Macleod, a clinical neuroscientist, was asked by Animal Aid to conduct a systemic review into Aziz's research. Macleod accidentally sent an email intended for a colleague to the animal rights group. The e-mail stated he felt that deep brain stimulation was an "area of weakness often trumpeted as a success, but which in reality is probably a failure." He asked for "advice" and suggested he would "avoid, play a straight bat or price [himself] out of the market" for the review requested.

Animal Aid said about the e-mail "He [Dr Macleod] feared that an objective investigation of the associated animal research would expose the treatment's shortcomings. He was determined to avoid being drawn into the front line of the vivisection debate."

Dr Macleod claimed that he stood by his choice not to do the review "I was not comfortable taking part in a study which was motivated by a desire to undermine Aziz."

=== Animal testing controversy ===
Aziz was vocal in support of animal testing and his criticism of the animal liberation movement, calling them "misinformed and sometimes illiterate anti-vivisectionists who adopt terrorist tactics" and who "[undermine] the process of democracy" through "intimidation". Britain has "probably the most violent and absurd animal rights movement in the world." He told The Guardian, "The problem with British society is it has a humanoid perception of animals that’s almost cartoon-like."

=== Defence of cosmetics testing ===
In an interview published on 4 March 2005, Aziz condoned testing cosmetics on animals, a practice banned in the UK since 1998 and fully across the European Union by 2013. He said that to argue cosmetics testing is wrong is "a very strange argument", and that "[p]eople talk about cosmetics being the ultimate evil. But beautifying oneself has been going on since we were cavemen. If it's proven to reduce suffering through animal tests, it’s not wrong to use them. To say cosmetics is an absolute evil is absurd."

Other scientists who use animals in research have "distanced themselves" from Aziz's remarks. Clive Page, a researcher at the University of London, said: "I don't think we can justify using animals for cosmetics research. [Prof Aziz], like myself and a few others who talk out about this have worked very hard to try and explain to the public why we do medical research on animals and why it's still necessary. To muddy the waters by bringing back an issue of using animals for something that’s not actually approved in the UK is perhaps unfortunate."

Simon Festing, director of the pro-animal experimentation lobby group Research Defence Society said of Aziz: "He's not involved in cosmetic testing himself, [Britain's] not involved in cosmetic testing, it's been banned here. There's no movement from the scientific community or the cosmetics industry to have it brought back in. I can't see it being particularly relevant apart from being his personal view."

=== Felix ===
An animal rights campaign has formed around a seven-year-old macaque monkey that Aziz has used in his research. Named Felix by Aziz himself, he is one of 100 purpose-bred monkeys used in animal experiments by Oxford University. Felix was featured in a November 2006 BBC documentary about Aziz's work, "Monkeys, Rats and Me". The monkey was shown being "shaped", that is, being encouraged to perform certain tasks by having food and water withheld, in advance of having the symptoms of Parkinson's disease induced. Electrodes were implanted in his brain to test the effects of deep brain stimulation on the Parkinsonian symptoms and on his ability to perform the tasks. He will be destroyed at the end of the experiment, which could continue for several years.

Since the BBC documentary aired, SPEAK, a British animal rights campaign formed in 2002, has used the "Fight for Felix" as a public focus of their efforts to halt the construction of a new £20 million animal-testing facility in South Park Road, Oxford.

== Death ==
Aziz died of oesophageal cancer in Oxford, UK, on 25 October 2024, at the age of 67. Earlier that year he had been honoured by the British Society for Stereotactic and Functional Neurosurgery for his contributions to world neurosurgery. He is survived by his wife Jocelyn, and daughter Laila from a previous marriage.

== Awards and nominations ==
Aziz was elected a Fellow of the Academy of Medical Sciences in 2012. In January 2013, he was nominated for the Service to Medicine award at the British Muslim Awards.

== See also ==
- British Bangladeshi
- List of British Bangladeshis
- John Stein (Professor of Physiology)
- Kevin Warwick
