= Concordat on Openness on Animal Research =

UK science initiative

The Concordat on Openness on Animal Research is a UK initiative of scientific organizations, funders and providers who directly carry out, or whose members or beneficiaries carry out animal research. It is a pledge by signatory organizations to offer the public greater information about research that involves animals.

The Concordat on Openness on Animal Research in the UK was established in 2014 to provide "measurable steps" for researchers that use animals in the UK, to talk openly about their work. It is part of the UK biomedical community's "openness agenda", which encourages researchers and technical staff who work in animal testing or research to talk openly about why their work is important to them.

At its launch, the Concordat on Openness' authors said that signatory organizations should "provide accurate descriptions of the benefits, harms and limitations of research, be realistic about the potential outputs of such research and be open about its impact on animal welfare and the ethical considerations involved". Signatories are strongly encouraged to offer access to their animal research facilities to journalists, MPs, and local school, patient and community groups and are required to have public-facing webpages that describe their relationship to the use of animals in scientific research, and state why they feel their practices are justified. Ideally, if they use animals in research within their own organization the webpages will state how many they use in a year and how they ensure that their animals are well-cared for. Many also explain UK regulations and practices that govern how animals in science are protected as well as highlighting their own areas of research.

== Background ==
In 2012 a UK opinion poll showed that two thirds of people did not trust the regulations that protected the animals used in science, and half did not feel sufficiently informed on the subject. A concerned group of UK research organizations including universities, medical research charities and government research institutes that use animals in scientific research they would address the lack of public communication about the use of animals in bio-medical research. The group developed a "concordat" to outline measurable steps that organizations could take to be more open with the public about how and why animals are used in scientific research.

It is one of several UK higher education research related Concordats, supported by UK Research and Innovation (UKRI), alongside the Concordat for Career Development of Researchers, the Concordat to Support Research Integrity, the Concordat on Open Research Data and the Concordat on Engaging the Public with Research.

The wording of the Concordat on Openness and accompanying guidance was developed by governance groups chaired by Geoff Watts and Wendy Jarrett. In drafting the Concordat these groups looked to the public, the scientific community and journalists to find out what steps needed to be taken an what openness meant to them. The Concordat on Openness on Animal Research in the UK was signed by 72 signatory organizations when it launched in 2014, and contains four commitments:

1. We will be clear about when, how and why we use animals in research
2. We will enhance our communications with the media and the public about our research using animals
3. We will be proactive in providing opportunities for the public to find out about research using animals
4. We will report on progress annually and share our experiences

Adherence to the four commitments is voluntary and self-reported by signatories annually. The information they provide is compiled into annual reports. Since 2016 it has been mandatory for all signatories are required to have publicly accessible information about how, when and why they use animals in research on their websites.

The UK's change in approach to communicating about animals in research, and the information available to the public about how animals are used in research has been noted around the world, with calls to develop similar initiatives in the USA and in Australia and New Zealand. Critics say that the "openness" championed by the concordat on openness is too selective to make a real difference, champions the status quo, and does not do enough to challenge the practices of organizations that use animals in research or hold them to account.

== Signatories ==
=== Universities ===
Organisation	Link to 'Concordat' policy on animals in research
Aberystwyth University	https://www.aber.ac.uk/en/media/departmental/rbi/staff-students/ethics/Experimental-work-involving-animals-at-Aberystwyth-University-En-v-2.pdfkwork
Aston University	https://www2.aston.ac.uk/research/research-strategy-and-policy/arrive-guidelines-for-use-of-animals-in-medical-research
Brunel University	https://www.brunel.ac.uk/about/administration/governance-and-university-committees/Animal-Research-at-Brunel
Cardiff University	http://www.cardiff.ac.uk/research/our-research-environment/integrity-and-ethics/animal-research
Durham University	https://www.dur.ac.uk/research.office/research.governance/research.ethics/involving.animals/statement/
Imperial College London	http://www.imperial.ac.uk/research-and-innovation/about-imperial-research/research-integrity/animal-research/
King's College London	https://www.kcl.ac.uk/innovation/research/corefacilities/bsu/index.aspx
London School of Hygiene and Tropical Medicine	http://www.lshtm.ac.uk/research/animalresearch/
Newcastle University	https://www.ncl.ac.uk/research/researchgovernance/animal/
Open University	http://www.open.ac.uk/research/ethics/animal-research
Plymouth University	https://www.plymouth.ac.uk/research/animals
Queen Mary University of London	http://www.qmul.ac.uk/research/statements/#
Queens University Belfast	http://www.qub.ac.uk/sites/AnimalResearch/
Robert Gordon University	https://www.rgu.ac.uk/research/university-research-policies/research-involving-animals
Royal Veterinary College	http://www.rvc.ac.uk/research/about/animals-in-research
St Georges University of London	http://www.sgul.ac.uk/research/openness-in%20animal-research/1638-openness-in-animal-research#how-many-animals-do-you-use
Swansea University	https://www.swansea.ac.uk/research/research-integrity-ethics-governance/research-ethics/
Ulster University	http://biomed.science.ulster.ac.uk/research-institute/animals-in-research/university-principles/
University College London	http://www.ucl.ac.uk/animal-research
University of Central Lancashire	https://www.uclan.ac.uk/research/environment/integrity.php
University of Aberdeen	https://www.abdn.ac.uk/staffnet/documents/policy-zone-research-and-knowledge-exchange/University_of_Aberdeen_-_Statement_on_Use_of_Animals_in_Research.pdf
University of Bath	http://www.bath.ac.uk/research/pdf/ethics/animalresearchwebamendedmay07.pdf
University of Birmingham	http://www.birmingham.ac.uk/facilities/bmsu/index.aspx
University of Bradford	https://www.bradford.ac.uk/governance/policies-and-statements/
University of Brighton	https://www.brighton.ac.uk/foi/publication-scheme/university-information/index.aspx
University of Bristol	http://www.bristol.ac.uk/animal-research/
University of Cambridge	https://www.cam.ac.uk/research/research-at-cambridge/animal-research
University of Dundee	https://www.dundee.ac.uk/governance/policies/
University of East Anglia	https://www.uea.ac.uk/research/about-uea-research/our-research-integrity/concordat/
University of Edinburgh	https://www.ed.ac.uk/research/animal-research?mc_cid=e95c650b6b&mc_eid=342c43481d
University of Exeter	http://www.exeter.ac.uk/research/inspiring/strategy/animals/
University of Glasgow	https://www.gla.ac.uk/research/strategy/ourpolicies/opennessinanimalresearch/
University of Hertfordshire	https://www.herts.ac.uk/research/research-management/governance/animal-research-at-the-university-of-hertfordshire/policy-statement-on-research-involving-the-use-of-animals
University of Leeds	http://www.leeds.ac.uk/info/5000/about/520/animal_research
University of Leicester	https://www2.le.ac.uk/institution/dbs
University of Liverpool	https://www.liv.ac.uk/research-integrity/biomedical-research/
University of Manchester	https://www.manchester.ac.uk/research/environment/governance/ethics/animals/
University of Nottingham	http://www.nottingham.ac.uk/animalresearch/index.aspx
University of Oxford	http://www.ox.ac.uk/news-and-events/animal-research/
University of Portsmouth	http://www.port.ac.uk/research/using-animals-in-research/
University of Reading	http://www.reading.ac.uk/research/animal-research
University of Sheffield	https://www.sheffield.ac.uk/ris/ethicsandintegrity/animal-research
University of Southampton	https://www.southampton.ac.uk/awerb/index.page
University of St Andrews	https://www.st-andrews.ac.uk/research/integrity-ethics/animals/
University of Stirling	https://www.stir.ac.uk/research/research-ethics-and-integrity/animal-research-at-the-university-of-stirling/
University of Strathclyde	https://www.strath.ac.uk/science/biomedicalresearchatstrathclyde/
University of Surrey	https://www.surrey.ac.uk/school-biosciences-medicine/biomedical-research-facility/animals
University of Sussex	https://www.sussex.ac.uk/research/about/standards/research-procedures-involving-animals
University of York	https://www.york.ac.uk/research/animal-research/

=== Learned Societies ===
Organization	Link to 'Concordat' policy on animals in research
Academy of Medical Sciences	https://acmedsci.ac.uk/policy/uk-policy/animals-in-research
Anatomical Society	https://www.anatsoc.org.uk/research/animals-in-research-policy-statement
Biochemical Society	https://www.biochemistry.org/science-policy/policy-position-statements/
British Association of Psychopharmacology	https://www.bap.org.uk/position_statement.php
British Neuroscience Association	https://www.bna.org.uk/about/policies/#animal-research-policy
British Pharmacological Society	https://www.bps.ac.uk/education-engagement/research-animals
British Society for Immunology	https://www.immunology.org/sites/default/files/the-use-of-animals-in-immunological-research-positiion-statement.pdf
British Toxicological Society	https://www.thebts.org/news/animal-research-the-british-toxicology-societys-position/
Microbiology Society	https://microbiologysociety.org/publication/position-statement/2015-use-of-animals-in-research.html
The Physiological Society	https://www.physoc.org/policy/animal-research/
Royal Society of Biology	https://www.rsb.org.uk/policy/policy-issues/biomedical-sciences/animal-research
The Royal Society	https://royalsociety.org/topics-policy/ethics-conduct/animal-testing/
Society of Endocrinology	
Society for Experimental Biology	http://www.sebiology.org/animal-biology/animal-welfare-code

=== Commercial Organizations ===
Organization	Link to 'Concordat' policy on animals in research
Agenda Life Sciences	https://www.agendalifesciences.com/animal-research-position/
AstraZeneca	https://www.astrazeneca.com/sustainability/ethics-and-transparency/animals-in-research.html
Charles River	https://www.criver.com/about-us/about-us-overview/animals-research?region=3696
Fortrea	https://www.fortrea.com/
Eurogentec	https://secure.eurogentec.com/animal-facilities.html
GlaxoSmithKline	https://www.gsk.com/en-gb/research-and-development/our-use-of-animals/frequently-asked-questions/
Inotiv	https://www.inotiv.com/concordat-on-openness
Lilly	https://www.lilly.co.uk/en/responsibility/transparency/animals-in-research.aspx
Pfizer	https://www.pfizer.co.uk/animal-welfare
Porton Biopharma	https://www.portonbiopharma.com/concordat-on-openness-on-animal-research/
S3	https://s3science.com/about/animal-research-why/
Sequani	https://www.sequani.com/Detail.aspx?page=Animal-Welfare
UCB	https://www.ucb.com/our-company/Animal-welfare

=== Trade Associations and Advocacy Groups ===
Organization	Link to 'Concordat' policy on animals in research
Association of Medical Research Charities (AMRC)	https://www.amrc.org.uk/use-of-animals-in-research
Association of British Pharmaceutical Industry (ABPI)	https://www.abpi.org.uk/medicine-discovery/new-medicines-data/research-using-animals/
British Horseracing Authority	https://www.britishhorseracing.com/regulation/veterinary-welfare/veterinary-info/
Institute of Animal Technology (IAT)	https://www.iat.org.uk/#!animaltechnology/cob6
Laboratory Animal Breeders Association (LABA)	http://laba-uk.com/site/?page_id=95
Laboratory Animal Science Association (LASA)	https://www.lasa.co.uk/PDF/Concordat_on_Openness.pdf
Laboratory Animals Veterinary Association (LAVA)	http://www.lava.uk.net/viewtopic.php?f=3&t=11
Medical Schools Council	https://www.medschools.ac.uk/our-work/research
Bioindustry Association (BIA)	https://www.bioindustry.org/policy/pre-clinical-and-clinical-research/animal-research.html
Understanding Animal Research	https://www.understandinganimalresearch.org.uk/about-us/uar-position-on-the-use-of-animals-in-research/
Universities UK	https://www.universitiesuk.ac.uk/policy-and-analysis/research-policy/Pages/research-policy.aspx
Veterinary Schools Council	https://www.vetschoolscouncil.ac.uk/news/position-statement-on-animal-research/

=== Charities ===
Organization	Link to 'Concordat' policy on animals in research
Alzheimer's Research UK	https://www.alzheimersresearchuk.org/about-us/our-influence/policy-work/position-statements/animal-research/
Animal Health Trust	https://www.aht.org.uk/research/animal-research
Asthma UK	https://www.asthma.org.uk/research/funding/research-ethics/
Bloodcancer UK	https://bloodcancer.org.uk/research/animals/
British Heart Foundation	https://www.bhf.org.uk/what-we-do/our-policies/animals-in-research
Cancer Research UK	https://www.cancerresearchuk.org/about-us/we-develop-policy/our-policy-on-supporting-science/the-use-of-animals-in-cancer-research
Cystic Fibrosis Trust	https://www.cysticfibrosis.org.uk/the-work-we-do/research/animal-testing
Humanimal Trust	https://www.humanimaltrust.org.uk/what-we-do/research/our-stance-animal-testing
Leukaemia UK	https://www.leukaemiauk.org.uk/Pages/Category/research-strategy
Motor Neurone Disease Association	https://www.mndassociation.org/get-involved/volunteering/volunteer-zone/volunteer-resources/information-for-you/research-involving-animals/
MS Society	https://www.mssociety.org.uk/research/latest-research/animal-research
Ovarian Cancer Action	https://ovarian.org.uk/our-research/animals-research/
Parkinson's UK	https://www.parkinsons.org.uk/about-us/animal-research-and-parkinsons
PTEN Research	https://www.ptenresearch.org/our-research/use-of-animals-in-research/
Versus Arthritis	https://www.versusarthritis.org/research/research-funding-and-policy/our-research-policies/
Wellcome	https://wellcome.ac.uk/what-we-do/our-work/our-policy-work-animal-research

=== Research Institutes ===
Organization	Link to 'Concordat' policy on animals in research
Babraham Institute	https://www.babraham.ac.uk/our-research/animal-research
Francis Crick Institute	https://www.crick.ac.uk/research/platforms-and-facilities/biological-research-facility/animal-research
Institute of Cancer Research	https://www.icr.ac.uk/our-research/about-our-research/animal-research/animal-research-at-the-icr
Moredun Research Institute	https://www.moredun.org.uk/research/about-moredun-research-institute
Pirbright Institute	https://www.pirbright.ac.uk/animals-in-research
Rothamsted Research	https://www.rothamsted.ac.uk/sustainable-agriculture-sciences
Wellcome Trust Sanger Institute	https://www.sanger.ac.uk/about/who-we-are/research-policies/animals-research

=== Government departments and agencies ===
Organizations	Link to 'Concordat' policy on animals in research
Animal Plant and Health Agency (APHA)	https://www.gov.uk/government/organisations/animal-and-plant-health-agency/about/research
BBSRC	https://bbsrc.ukri.org/research/briefings/animals-in-bioscience-research/
CEFAS	https://www.cefas.co.uk/about-us/policies-and-plans/
Engineering and Physical Sciences Research Council (EPSRC)	https://www.epsrc.ac.uk/about/standards/animalresearchpolicy/
Food and Environment Research Agency (FERA Science)	https://www.fera.co.uk/about-us/standards-and-accreditation
Medical Research Council (MRC)	https://mrc.ukri.org/research/research-involving-animals/
Medicines and Healthcare Products Regulatory Agency (MHRA)	https://www.gov.uk/government/publications/animal-use-in-medicines-and-medical-devices-regulation/animal-use-in-medicines-and-medical-devices-regulation
National Centre for the Replacement, Refinement and Reduction of Animals in Research (NC3Rs)	https://www.nc3rs.org.uk/news/importance-transparency-research-using-animals
Natural Environment Research Council (NERC)	https://nerc.ukri.org/about/policy/animals-in-research/?changesetid=EA34E605-95B3-4ACA-84F0A2ECAEA25F00
Public Health England (PHE)	https://www.gov.uk/government/publications/public-health-england-phe-research-involving-animals/public-health-england-research-involving-animals

== Administration and activities ==
The Concordat on Openness on Animal Research in the UK is run and administered by Understanding Animal Research. Awards to celebrate innovation and best practices around openness are held annually in December, coinciding with release of the annual report. In 2018 signatories of the Concordat on Openness on Animal Research publicly announced the top ten UK universities for animal research, stating that these universities, all of which appear in the QS 2018 World University Ranking Top 200, carried out over a third of all animal research conducted in the UK in 2017.
