= Americans for Medical Progress =

U.S. nonprofit organization

Americans for Medical Progress (AMP) is a nonprofit advocacy group that supports the use of animal testing in biomedical research. Although in favor of moderate animal welfare measures, the AMP aligns against animal rights groups such as PETA and the similarly named Americans For Medical Advancement.

AMP issues the Albert. B. Sabin Hero of Science Award to honor leading medical scientists and advocates of biomedical research. Past recipients have included Dr. Sabin himself, Nobel laureate Joseph E. Murray, vaccine designer Maurice Hilleman, and herceptin developer Dennis Slamon, as well as opera legend Beverly Sills, actress Barbara Barrie, and former U. S. Representatives John E. Porter and Patricia Schroeder for their support and advocacy of medical research.

In Spring 2008 the organization awarded Tom Holder, the spokesman for Pro-Test, the Michael D. Hayre fellowship in public outreach. This allowed Holder to move to the United States, and with the support of AMP, set up Speaking of Research a campus-oriented group supporting animal research with similar tactics to Pro-Test. In July 2009 AMP announced three new Hayre Fellows to work on local and national advocacy efforts.

In April 2009 Americans for Medical Progress launched the Pro-Test Petition in conjunction with Speaking of Research and UCLA Pro-Test. According to Holder the petition offered the public "[an] opportunity to show [their] support for the scientists and [their] opposition to the use of threats and violence". This petition, to defend animal research, is similar to The People's Petition which gained over 20,000 signatures in the United Kingdom. The Pro-Test Petition has accumulated over 10,000 signatures to date.

== See also ==
- Speaking of Research
