= Pro-Test =

British group promoting animal testing

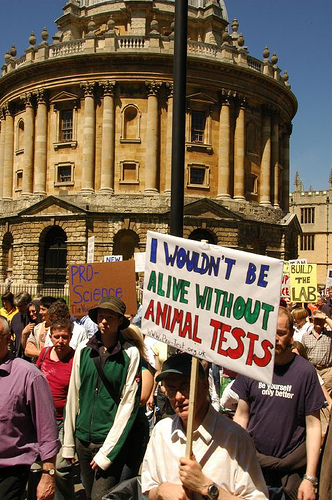
A Pro-Test march on 3 June 2006, Oxford, UK

Pro-Test was a British group that promoted and supported animal testing in medical research. It was founded on 29 January 2006 to counter SPEAK, an animal-rights campaign opposing the construction by Oxford University of a biomedical and animal-research facility, which SPEAK believes may include a primate-testing centre. Pro-Test held its first rally on 25 February 2006, attracting hundreds in support of the research facility and opposed by a smaller number of anti-lab demonstrators.

The group was founded by Laurie Pycroft from Swindon when he was 16. After forming the group, British newspapers described Pycroft as a "sixth form drop-out", "bedroom blogger", and "campaigning hero." It is now run by a committee of ten: academics (Tipu Aziz, John Stein, and David Priestman), five Oxford graduate and undergraduate students, medical writer Alison Eden, and Pycroft.

Pro-Test says that it stands for "science, reasoned debate and, above all, the welfare of mankind. … We support only non-violent protest and we condemn those using violence or intimidation to further their goals. We strongly support animal testing as crucially necessary to further medical science."

In February 2011, five years after its first rally, Pro-Test wound up its activities, saying it had "successfully met its goals of defending the construction of the Oxford Lab, increasing awareness of the importance of animal research, and bringing the public on-side in support of life-saving medical research." Its US-based spin-off, Speaking of Research, remained active in the UK and US.

== Background ==
The construction site of the Oxford research centre is located on South Parks Road behind a five-metre (15 ft) barrier. Construction work is carried out by workmen wearing balaclavas and using unmarked vehicles, after the first contractor, Walter Lilly, owned by Montpellier plc, pulled out in the face of threats. The facility is intended to become the "centre for all animal research at Oxford", according to Mark Matfield, former director of the Research Defence Society, resulting in "the closure of a number of existing animal facilities".

The formation of Pro-Test coincided with threats made by the Animal Liberation Front, against Oxford staff and students, on the Bite Back website. ALF spokesman, Robin Webb confirmed that "high-level student groups working against SPEAK protesters may be targeted."

Pycroft describes in his blog, hosted at the LiveJournal website, how he set up Pro-Test after visiting his girlfriend in Oxford on 28 January 2006 and watching a SPEAK demonstration from the window of a coffee shop. Pycroft, his girlfriend, and one other, staged a personal counter-demonstration.

After writing about the experience on his blog, Pycroft has said he was receiving 300 hits an hour within days, and after attracting interest from the media, Oxford students, and the pro-animal-testing movement, he decided to schedule a second demonstration to coincide with a SPEAK protest on 25 February 2006. According to The Times, "Pro-Test’s tactics mirror those of animal rights activists, with about 150 students using websites and chat forums to organise protests."

== February 2006 rally ==
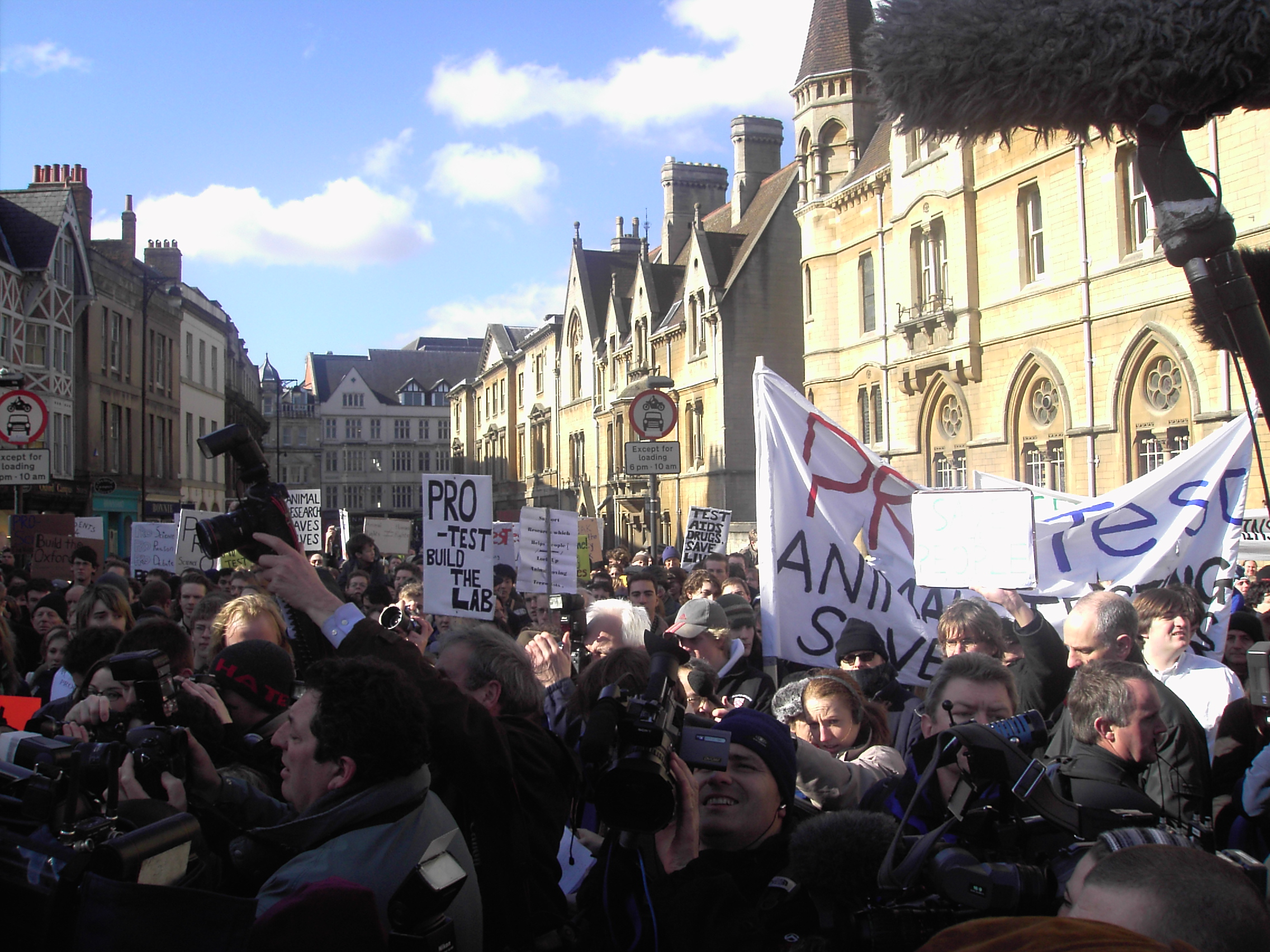
The first Pro-Test march on 25 February 2006, in Broad Street, Oxford, UK

According to the Daily Telegraph, over 800 students, academics and members of the public took part in the 25 February 2006 protest in the centre of Oxford which passed without violent incident, marching at the same time as more than 150 SPEAK protesters demonstrated in various locations across the city.

A number of politicians and scientists addressed the Pro-Test demonstrators. These included Evan Harris, the Liberal Democrat science spokesperson and MP for Oxford West and Abingdon; the Radcliffe Hospital's neurosurgeon and Pro-Test committee member Professor Tipu Aziz, whose research into Parkinson's disease "involves the use of primates", and who recently spoke out in support of testing cosmetics on animals; Simon Festing of the Research Defence Society, a lobby group funded by the pharmaceutical industry and universities; and Pro-Test committee member Professor John Stein, an Oxford neurophysiologist who "induces Parkinson's disease in monkeys and then attaches electrodes to their brains to test therapies which may help human sufferers", according to The Guardian. In his speech to the crowd, Stein declared, "This is a historic day; we are drawing a line in the sand."

== June 2006 rally ==
Supporters of Pro-Test marched through Oxford on Saturday, 3 June 2006. Their route led them through Radcliffe Square, the High Street and ended nearby the laboratory in the university's science area. Speakers included Colin Blakemore (then chief executive of the Medical Research Council), Evan Harris MP and Alan Duncan MP (the Shadow Cabinet Trade and Industry Secretary). David Priestman, a researcher of genetic disorders in children at Oxford University, told the Oxford Mail his reasons for joining the rally:

I have worked in animal research for nearly 30 years and at last I can speak out about what I do. I'm exceptionally proud of my work. What right have animal rights activists to say my work is not scientific?

== February 2008 rally ==
Pro-Test held a third rally in Oxford on 9 February 2008. According to the BBC, around 200 people marched in protest at "fear and intimidation" from animal rights groups. Towards the start of the event, a lone animal rights protester started to shout in counter protest, but was escorted away by the police.

Speakers at the rally included Robin Lovell-Badge, a stem cell researcher at the National Institute for Medical Research, Evan Harris and Laurie Pycroft. Peter Hollins, chief executive of the British Heart Foundation and chair of the Coalition for Medical Progress, was also scheduled to attend but was unable due to illness.

== Pro-Test in the United States ==
In Spring 2008, Pro-Test Spokesman, Tom Holder, set up Speaking of Research, a group based in the US with similar goals to that of Pro-Test

On 22 April 2009 more than 700 staff, students and Los Angeles residents led by the neuroscientist Professor David Jentsch held a rally to launch the UCLA chapter of Pro-Test, and to stand up to the animal rights extremists who has targeted Prof. Jentsch and other scientists in a campaign of harassment and arson. At the event, Tom Holder announced the launch of The Pro-Test Petition which aims to give people in the US the "opportunity to show [their] support for the scientists and [their] opposition to the use of threats and violence". This petition, to defend animal research, is similar to The People's Petition which gained over 20,000 signatures in the United Kingdom.

== Other activities ==
An unnamed Oxford academic told the BBC that "a war is looming over 'scientific freedom' and the 'future of progress'", and suggests that the Pro-Test campaign is part of a wider reaction against animal-rights activism.

Pro-Test have taken the case for animal research to Parliament, participating in a debate at The Associate Parliamentary Group for Animal Welfare (APGAW). The debate focused specifically upon whether the Oxford biomedical research lab should be built and involved both MPs and members of the public. The principal speakers were Iain Simpson, press officer for Pro-Test, and Dr. Jarrod Bailey of Europeans for Medical Progress.

Pro-Test handed out doughnuts and cakes to workers on the South Parks Road site on 31 March 2006 to show their support for their work.

Pro-Test fielded Pycroft for a debate at the Oxford Union on the motion "This house would not test on animals". Supporting the motion were Dr Gill Langley, Dr Andrew Knight, Uri Geller and Alistair Currie. On the opposing side were Pycroft, Professor Colin Blakemore, Professor John Stein and Professor Lord Robert Winston. The motion was defeated, 273 to 48 of the Union members voting with the opposing side.

A cross-college student referendum proposed by Pro-Test was held on 16 November 2006. It proposed support for the Oxford lab's construction and animal testing in general, and found support from approximately 90% of voters.

On 9 May 2006, the BBC reported that Pro-Test had bought ten shares in GlaxoSmithKline (GSK), as a "gesture of solidarity" with the company and its investors. An animal rights group had earlier sent letters to individual shareholders threatening to reveal personal details unless their shares were sold. The letters explained GSK's investors were targeted because of the company's association with Huntingdon Life Sciences. Pro-Test announced that their share purchase was to demonstrate that "intimidation has no place in the UK".

British Prime Minister Tony Blair gave his support to Pro-Test and The People's Petition in an article for the Sunday Telegraph, citing "the Pro-Test demonstration in Oxford, which... deserves support" as an example of the change in public attitudes in the UK.

The BBC programme Newsnight hosted a debate on animal testing on 24 July 2006. Tipu Aziz, John Stein and Iain Simpson of Pro-Test featured in the debate, as did members of SPEAK and Europeans for Medical Progress.

== Closure ==
In February 2011, five years after its first rally, Pro-Test announced that it had wound up its activities after it claimed to have "successfully met its goals of defending the construction of the Oxford Lab, increasing awareness of the importance of animal research, and bringing the public on-side in support of life-saving medical research." However, its initially US-based spin-off, Speaking of Research, "continues to be active in the UK and US."

== Pro-Test Italia ==
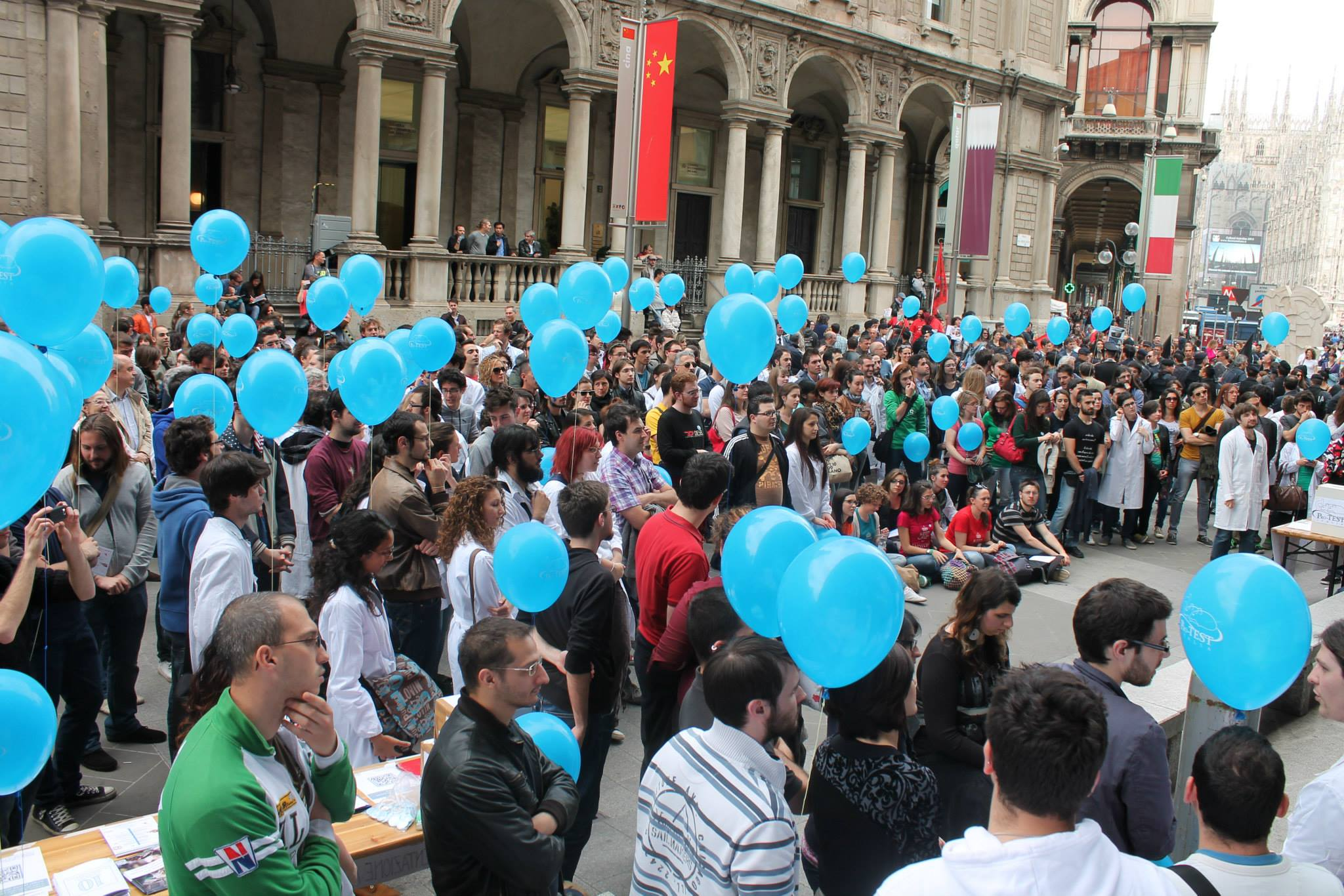
A Pro-Test Italia demonstration in Milan

In September 2012, an Italian spin-off of Pro-Test was created and named "Pro-Test Italia". It has been founded by a group of scientists and students concerned about the spiralling of violence and pressure over government and public opinion against animal testing; these circumstances led to the closure of "Green Hill", a beagle-breeding facility in Northern Italy in July 2012, after several raids during the previous months by animal-rights activists, one of which including the stealing of some dogs from the facility on 28 April 2012.

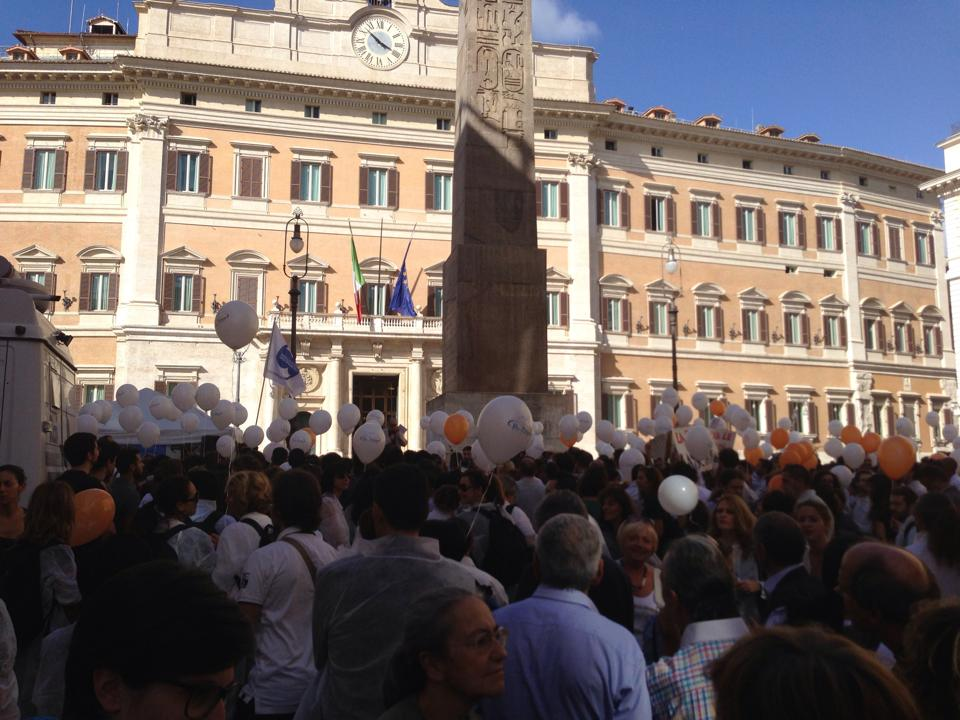
A Pro-Test Italia demonstration in Rome

On 20 April 2013, another foray to an animal testing facility took place at the University of Milan, which led to the release of mice and rabbits and consistent damage to researches carried out for years). It was made by the same group of activists, united under the banner of "Stop Green Hill".
Following this event, Pro-Test Italia called for a rally in defense of animal testing on 1 June in Milan. It was meant to condemn the animal-rights activists' actions and to raise awareness about the importance of animal testing in medical research. The protest also had positive press coverage in international scientific journals such as Nature and The Scientist. Some animal-rights activists tried to interfere but the Police prevented any escalation.

On 8 June 2013 Pro-Test Italia organized in various Italian cities the event "Italia unita per la corretta informazione scientifica" (Italy united for scientific information).

On 19 September 2013 a second demonstration took place, this time in Rome, to persuade the Italian government to revise the national amendments to the European Directive 2013/63/EU which could put at risk biomedical research in Italy.

== Pro-Test Deutschland ==
In May 2015, a group of students and scientists in Germany decided to follow the example of their colleagues in the UK and Italy and founded "Pro-Test Deutschland". Pro-Test Deutschland is a non-profit organization that first began as a reaction to the decision made by Nikos Logothetis, director of the Max Planck Institute for Biological Cybernetics in Tübingen to discontinue his research with nonhuman primates. Logothetis's decision came after an undercover animal rights activist had filmed in the monkey facility of the Tübingen institute. The film was broadcast on national television in September 2014, leading to protests and hostility against the institute and against animal research in general.

After these events there was a lack of response by the scientific community to come out publicly in support of basic animal research like that conducted at the Tübingen institute. Many officials seemed quite unprepared for such a situation. Pro-Test Deutschland therefore decided to promote the education of its members and the public about how to speak and communicate about animal research effectively.

Pro-Test Deutschland issued a mission statement in which they point out that scientists do not lack moral fibre but rather a voice to speak about science. Pro-Test Deutschland intends to lend its voice so the public and scientists can engage in an informed and fair debate. Unlike Pro-Test UK and Pro-Test Italia, who take a very vocal position for animal research, and raise support through public actions and demonstrations, Pro-Test Deutschland is more interested in sharing information and engendering an open, educated and unbiased debate.

To date Pro-Test Deutschland mostly focuses its activities on maintaining an informative and well-balanced website containing FAQs and fact checking sections as well as on community outreach and media communication. Additionally, Pro-Test Deutschland is engaging with the Tübingen public more directly by means such as information booths in the Market Square. Since journalists in Germany wishing to report on animal research had heretofore been lacking reliable information in German, Pro-Test Deutschland quickly received a lot of attention, with national newspapers printing interviews. and national radio inviting one of their speakers to panel discussions. Pro-Test Deutschland, being initially based in Tübingen, has by now grown to include students and scientists in other German towns and cities such as Frankfurt, Bonn, Münster, Göttingen, Leipzig and Berlin.

== See also ==
- The People's Petition
- Speaking of Research
