= Huntingdon Life Sciences =

Contract research organisation

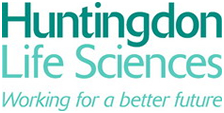
- Industry: Pharmaceutical industry
- Founded: 1951; 75 years ago in Cambridgeshire, England
- Fate: Merged into Envigo (now Inotiv)
- Successor: Inotiv
- Headquarters: East Millstone, New Jersey, YS
- Area served: Global
- Key people: Brian Cass, Former Managing Director
- Services: Contract research organization
- Revenue: $242 million
- Operating income: $35 million
- Net income: $10 million
- Total assets: $171 million
- Total equity: -$15 million
- Number of employees: >1,600

Huntingdon Life Sciences (HLS) was a contract research organisation (CRO) organized in Maryland and headquartered in East Millstone, New Jersey, US. It was founded in 1951 in Cambridgeshire, England. It had two laboratories in the United Kingdom and one in the United States. With over 1,600 employees, it was the largest non-clinical CRO in Europe and the third-largest non-clinical CRO in the world. In September 2015, Huntingdon Life Sciences, Harlan Laboratories, GFA, NDA Analytics and LSR associates merged into Envigo (now Inotiv).

HLS provided contract research organization services in pre-clinical and non-clinical biological safety evaluation research. As with other major CROs operating in this business area, its major business is serving the pharmaceutical industry. However, more than a third of its business came from non-pharmaceutical sources, such as the crop protection industry which accounts for around 60% of its non-pharmaceutical business.

HLS had two facilities in the UK (Huntingdon, Cambridgeshire and Eye, Suffolk), one in the USA (East Millstone, New Jersey) and an office in Japan (Tokyo).

The company was one of the largest participants in the international primate trade and has been criticized for its animal testing practices, most specifically animal testing on non-human primates as well as on beagles. The Stop Huntingdon Animal Cruelty campaign was formed with the goal of shutting down the company due to animal rights violations.

== History ==
Huntingdon Life Sciences was founded in the UK in 1951 as Nutrition Research Co. Ltd., a commercial organisation that initially focused on nutrition, veterinary, and biochemical research. The original facilities were split over two locations; the main offices were within Cromwell House in the town of Huntingdon; and the main laboratories were at the Hartford Field Station, just over a mile away. It then became involved with pharmaceuticals, food additives, and industrial and consumer chemicals. In 1959 it changed its name to Nutritional Research Unit Ltd. The company benefited in the early 1960s from increased government regulatory testing requirements, especially in the pharmaceutical industry. In 1964, it was acquired by Becton Dickinson.

In April 1983, Becton Dickinson created Huntingdon Research Centre PLC. It then offered four million American depositary receipts (ADRs) for sale at $15 each, representing the company's entire interest in Huntingdon. In 1985, as it began to expand its operations, the company changed its name to Huntingdon International Holdings plc. That year, it established Huntingdon Analytical Services Inc. to conduct business in the United States.

To augment its CRO business, Huntingdon acquired Minnesota's Twin City Testing Laboratory and affiliated companies in 1985, followed by the acquisition of Nebraska Testing Corporation in 1986; Travis Laboratories and Kansas City Test Laboratory Inc. in 1989; and Southwestern Laboratories, Inc. in 1990. Huntingdon also diversified its operations, primarily in the United States, becoming involved in engineering and environmental services.

In 1987, HLS acquired Northern Engineering and Testing. In 1988, it acquired Empire Soils Investigations, Chen Associates, and Asteco Inc. In 1988, HLS was floated on the London Stock Exchange and in 1989 obtained a listing on the New York Stock Exchange. In 1990, Huntingdon acquired the St. Louis branch of Envirodyne Engineers and Whiteley Holdings. In 1991, it acquired Austin Research Engineers, followed by Travers Morgan.

By the early 1990s, Huntingdon was organised into three business groups: the Life Sciences Group, the Engineering/Environmental Group, and the Travers Morgan Group, which offered engineering and environmental consulting services outside of the United States. However, only the Life Sciences Group showed long-term promise. Travers Morgan was allowed to lapse into insolvency, control passed into other hands, and Huntingdon wrote off the investment. In 1995, the engineering and environmental businesses were sold to Maxim Engineers of Dallas, Texas.

To bolster its CRO business and reinforce its U.S. presence, in 1995, Huntingdon acquired the toxicology business of Applied Biosciences International for $32.5 million in cash, plus the Leicester Clinical Research Centre. The deal included a U.S. laboratory located near Princeton, New Jersey, as well as two British facilities. In 1997, Huntingdon International Holdings changed its name to Huntingdon Life Sciences Group. The U.K. subsidiary, Huntingdon Research Centre, changed its name to Huntingdon Life Sciences, while the U.S. business operated as Huntingdon Life Sciences Inc.

In 2002, HLS moved its financial centre to the United States and incorporated in Maryland as Life Sciences Research.

In 2009, HLS was acquired.

In September 2015, Huntingdon Life Sciences, Harlan Laboratories, GFA, NDA Analytics and LSR associates merged into Envigo (now Inotiv).

== Staff numbers ==
The latest available public figures from 2008 show that HLS employs more than 1,600 staff across all of its facilities. They break down as:

	2008	2007
UK	1,303	1,313
US	333	309
Japan	12	12
Total	1,648	1,634

== Trade bodies and associations ==
- Association of the British Pharmaceutical Industry (ABPI)
- Bioindustry Association (BIA)
- Association for Assessment and Accreditation of Laboratory Animal Care (AAALAC)
- Society of Environmental Toxicology and Chemistry (SETAC)
- Fund for the Replacement of Animals in Medical Experiments (FRAME)
- Institute of Animal Technology (IAT)
- Understanding Animal Research (UAR)

== Honours and awards ==
- Agrow Awards Best Supporting Role 2007
- Queens Award for Export Achievement 1982.

== Use of animals ==
HLS uses animals in the biomedical research it conducts for its customers. The most recent numbers released state that in the UK around 60,000 animals are used annually. This number is broken down by species:

Animal	Usage
Mouse	19.25%
Fish	3.45%
Rat	71.05%
Bird	0.92%
Other mammals	5.31%

== Controversies ==
Huntingdon is criticised by animal rights and animal welfare groups for using animals in research, for instances of animal abuse and for the wide range of substances it tests on animals, particularly non-medical products. It is claimed by SHAC that 500 animals died every day at HLS (182,500 a year), a figure at odds with HLS' published numbers.

Huntingdon's labs were infiltrated by undercover animal rights activists in 1997 in the UK and in 1998 in the US.

In 1997, film secretly recorded inside HLS in the UK by BUAV and subsequently broadcast on Channel 4 television as "It's a Dog's Life", showed serious breaches of animal-protection laws, including a beagle puppy being held up by the scruff of the neck and repeatedly punched in the face, and animals being taunted.

The laboratory technicians responsible were suspended from HLS the day after the broadcast. All three were later dismissed. Two of the men seen hitting and shaking dogs were found guilty under the Protection of Animals Act 1911 of "cruelly terrifying dogs." It was the first time laboratory technicians had been prosecuted for animal cruelty in the UK. HLS admitted that the technicians' behaviour was deplorable and a new management team was introduced the following year which, according to The Daily Telegraph, "introduced greater openness and new training methods."

In 1998, an undercover investigator for People for the Ethical Treatment of Animals (PETA) used a camera hidden in her glasses to make 50 hours of videotape of the HLS laboratories in Princeton, New Jersey. She also made four 90-minute audiotapes, photocopied 8,000 company documents, and copied the company's client list. According to PETA some of the film she shot showed a monkey being dissected while still alive and conscious. The president of HLS in New Jersey, Alan Staple, said the monkey was alive but sedated during the dissection.

A 2001 article from The Resurgence Trust stated that HLS obtained a "gagging order" in the US that prevents PETA from publicising or talking about any of the information that they discovered. The order also prevented PETA from communicating with the American Department of Agriculture, which had been going to investigate the evidence.

=== Protests and intimidation ===
The Stop Huntingdon Animal Cruelty (SHAC) campaign is based in the UK and US, and has aimed to close the company down since 1999. According to its website, the campaign's methods are restricted to non-violent direct action, as well as lobbying and demonstrations. It targets not only HLS itself, but any company, institution, or person allegedly doing business with the laboratory, whether as clients, suppliers, or even disposal and cleaning services, and the employees of those companies.

Despite its stated non-violent position, SHAC members have been convicted of crimes of violence against HLS employees. On 25 October 2010 five SHAC members received prison sentences for threatening HLS staff. SHAC has also been accused of encouraging arson and violent assault. An HLS director was assaulted in front of his child. HLS managing director Brian Cass was sent a mousetrap primed with razor blades, and in February 2001 was attacked by three men armed with pickaxe handles and CS gas. Another businessman with links to HLS was attacked and knocked unconscious adjacent to a barn his assailants had set alight.

Both SHAC and Animal Liberation Front activists have been alleged to have been engaged in harassment and intimidation, including issuing hoax bomb threats and death threats. In 2003, Daniel Andreas San Diego was accused by the American FBI of "ecoterrorism" in support of SHAC in the San Francisco Area; however, there is some question whether his "terrorist plot" was an entrapment operation by the American FBI. In 2008 seven of SHAC's senior members were described by prosecutors as "some of the key figures in the Animal Liberation Front" and found guilty of conspiracy to blackmail HLS.

=== Effect of campaign ===
The campaign against HLS led to its share price crashing, the Royal Bank of Scotland closing its bank account, and the British government arranging for the Bank of England to give them an account. In 2000, HLS was dropped from the New York Stock Exchange because of its market capitalization had fallen below NYSE limits.

=== Government response ===
From 2006, The Daily Telegraph reports, the British Government took the decision to tackle "the problem of animal rights extremism." On 1 May 2007, a police campaign called Operation Achilles was enacted against SHAC, a series of raids involving 700 police officers in England, Amsterdam, and Belgium. In total, 32 people linked to the group were arrested, and seven leading members of SHAC, including Greg Avery, were found guilty of blackmail. Police estimated in 2007 that, as a consequence of the operation, "up to three quarters of the most violent activists" were jailed. Der Spiegel writes that the number of attacks on HLS and their business declined drastically but "the movement is by no means dead."
