= Michael Festing =

British research scientist

Michael Festing is a British research scientist best known for his interest in animal testing.

He is one of 19 members of the UK's Animal Procedures Committee, which advises the Home Secretary on matters related to animal testing. He was previously a trustee of the Fund for the Replacement of Animals in Medical Experiments (FRAME ), which funds and promotes research into the use of animal alternatives. He is also a council member of the Institute of Laboratory Animals Research USA.

Most of Festing's career has been involved in promoting reduction of the numbers of animals used in research. Nonetheless, Festing has been criticized by the animal rights movement for his investment in companies that engage in animal testing, which according to the Animal Procedures Committee register of members' interests, includes AstraZeneca, GlaxoSmithKline, Alizyme, Akambis, Cambridge Antibody, Shire Pharmaceuticals, and Celltech.

He is also a consultant geneticist to Harlan UK, which supplies animals to laboratories.

== Life and education ==
Festing is a chartered statistician, has a Ph.D in quantitative genetics from Iowa State University, and a D.Sc. from the University of London.

He is the father of Simon Festing, the former executive director of the Research Defence Society, which focuses on supplying information about, and defending, the use of animals in medical experiments in the UK.

== Research ==
Festing is the author of over 200 scientific papers on laboratory animal genetics and related issues. He has a particular interest in improving the design of animal experiments, particularly in the area of toxicology testing. He has written books cataloguing laboratory animals, including International Index of Laboratory Animals and Inbred Strains in Biomedical Research.

== Award ==
He was the winner in 1996 of the GlaxoSmithKline Laboratory Animal Welfare Prize for his work while at the University of Leicester on "improved experimental design leading to reductions in the use of laboratory animals."
