= Festing =

Festing is a surname. Notable people with the surname include:

- Andrew Festing (born 1941), English portrait painter
- Edward Robert Festing (1839–1912), English major-general, chemist, and first Director of the Science Museum in London
- Sir Francis Festing (1902–1976), British field marshal
- Sir Francis Worgan Festing (1833–1886), British Royal Marines major-general
- John Festing (1837–1902), English clergyman who became Bishop of St Albans
- Matthew Festing (1949–2021), English Grand Master of the Sovereign Military Order of Malta
- Michael Festing, British research scientist
- Michael Christian Festing (1705–1752), English violinist and composer
- Sally Festing (born 1938), British biographer and poet
- Simon Festing, British activist and executive director of the Research Defence Society

== See also ==
- Festing penny
