= Niall Shanks =

English philosopher and intelligent design critic

Niall Shanks (18 January 1959 – 13 July 2011) was an English philosopher and critic of intelligent design.

== Career ==
Shanks was born in Cheshire, England, was educated at Rossall School, and later at the University of Leeds and the University of Liverpool. Shanks left England for Canada in 1981 and earned his PhD at the University of Alberta, Canada in 1987. Shanks moved to the United States in 1987. For a number of years Shanks was a member of the Department of Philosophy at East Tennessee State University, where he also held positions in the Department of Biological Sciences and the Department of Physics and Astronomy. He then moved to Wichita State University where he was the Curtis D. Gridley Professor in the History and Philosophy of Science.

Shanks served a term as President (2008–09) of the Southwest and Rocky Mountain Division of the American Association for the Advancement of Science; He was vice-president and board member of Americans For Medical Advancement for ten years; and an honorary board member of Internet Infidels. In 1993 he served a term as President of the Tennessee Philosophical Association. He died on 13 July 2011.

Shanks' early research interests were focused on issues in the philosophical foundations of quantum mechanics. He later wrote about the case against Intelligent Design and actively defended evolution. Beginning in the 1990s he explored the implications of evolutionary biology for biomedical research and was actively involved in this until his death. Shanks was also interested in the history of medicine and the role played by medicine in the scientific revolutions of the sixteenth and seventeenth centuries.

== Research ==
=== Quantum theory ===
Shanks early work was focused on so-called hidden-variables theory of non-relativistic elementary quantum mechanics, and the problem of the construction of classical models (models exhibiting the properties of determinateness and determinism) for quantum measurement statistics. Shanks argued that the various no-hidden-variables proofs rested on questionable assumptions which a classical modeller could plausibly deny. Shanks would later argue that local deterministic models were indeed possible for the puzzling quantum spin correlation statistics that were used to characterise Bell's Theorem (a modern incarnation of the Einstein-Podolsky-Rosen paradox EPR paradox). Shanks' essay, "Quantum Mechanics and Determinism" (Philosophical Quarterly, 1993, vol. 43, 170:20–37) summarises his arguments in an accessible manner. At this point in time, working with W. David Sharp, Shanks examined some puzzles concerning counterfactual interpretations of quantum mechanics. This work culminated in the Sharp and Shanks proof that counterfactual interpretations of quantum spin measurements could not be reconciled with the validated predictions of quantum mechanics.

=== Animals, science and animal science ===
Shanks has explored the role played by animal experimentation in the contexts of anatomy and physiology during the renaissance. He has argued that animal experimentation provided a crucial driving force behind the method of analysis and synthesis that would come to play a central role in the emergence of the physico-chemical sciences in the 17th and 18th centuries. According to Shanks, the development of modern science flows from physik (i.e., medicine) to physics, and not the reverse as is commonly supposed. Physics would ultimately come to have profound implications for physiology, and these matters are explored by Shanks in his work on the writings of the great 19th century French physiologist, Claude Bernard. In the course of his explorations of the implications of the study of animals for the modern scientific view of the world, Shanks has explored the issue of animal consciousness and the question as to what, if anything, science can teach us about the mental lives of animals. Shanks has argued that there is no straightforward fact of the matter to settle disputes between those who have a very generous view of the mental lives of animals (for example, in some versions of cognitive ethology derived from the work of Donald Griffin), and those who favour minimalistic cognitive estimates (for example, some species of behaviorism). Shanks has argued that disputes about these matters hinge not on appeals to the facts, but rather on disputes about what the relevant facts are, and where these disputes do not themselves admit of a straightforward factual resolution.

=== Creationism ===
Shanks was a staunch defender of evolutionary biology and a vehement opponent of creationism (and its recent incarnation in the form of intelligent design theology). Shanks argued that the intelligent design movement is rooted in bad science, bad theology and a radical right-wing social agenda. His views may be found in his book, God, The Devil and Darwin. Shanks conducted numerous public debates with creationists and advocates of intelligent design, including Duane Gish, William Dembski, Paul Nelson (creationist) and Michael Behe. Shanks is an advocate of methodological naturalism and has argued against drawing supernatural conclusions on the basis of either biological complexity or puzzles in cosmology concerning the fine-tuned universe. In addition to evolution, Shanks emphasised the role played by self-organization in a purely naturalistic account of biological and cosmological phenomena.

=== Evolution and medicine ===
Shanks made contributions to debates on topics in what may be broadly characterised as evolutionary medicine. It is now generally recognised that the implications evolutionary biology for medicine must be taken into account if modern medical inquiry is to be placed on a sound theoretical foundation. The great population geneticist Theodosius Dobzhansky once remarked that "nothing in biology makes sense except in the light of evolution." This is especially true of modern medicine. Shanks has argued that evolutionary biology is highly important when considering the so-called prediction problem in biomedical research. It has become common scientific practice in research in toxicology, drug development, pathology and therapeutics to explore human biomedical phenomena by performing experiments on nonhuman animals and then extrapolating the results to humans (animals play many roles in biomedical research, but one important role is as predictors of human biomedical phenomena). Shanks claims that a prediction problem exists due to the fact that humans and their nonhuman models have taken divergent evolutionary trajectories, and are thus not qualitatively identical systems (once compensation has been made for purely quantitative differences in body weight, for example). Put bluntly, the prediction problem boils down to this: if mice are not men writ small, under what conditions do we expect experimental results on mice to have informational value for human biomedical phenomena? Two of Shanks' essays have generated some interest in this puzzle.

== Publications ==
- Brute Science: Dilemmas of Animal Experimentation, co-authored with Hugh LaFollette. London: Routledge, 1996.
- Idealization in Contemporary Physics, N. Shanks (Ed.). Amsterdam: Rodopi, 1998.
- Logic, Probability and Science, N. Shanks and R.B. Gardner (Eds.). Amsterdam: Rodopi, 2000.
- Animals and Science: A Guide to the Debates. Santa Barbara, CA: ABC-CLIO, 2002.
- God, the Devil, and Darwin: A Critique of Intelligent Design Theory. New York: Oxford University Press, 2004.
- Animal Models in the Light of Evolution, co-authored with C. Ray Greek. Boca Raton, FL: Brown Walker 2009.

In addition, Shanks has written over fifty scholarly articles and is also the author of numerous book reviews.
