= Gill Langley =

British scientist and writer (born 1952)

- Born: 10 August 1952 (age 73)
- Education: MA (physiology, cell biology, and zoology), PhD (neurochemistry)
- Alma mater: University of Cambridge
- Occupations: Animal rights scientist & writer
- Known for: Alternatives to animal testing, animal rights

Gillian Rose Langley (born 10 August 1952) is a British scientist and writer who specialises in alternatives to animal testing and animal rights. She was, from 1981 until 2009, the science director of the Dr Hadwen Trust for Humane Research, a medical research charity developing non-animal research techniques. She was an anti-vivisection member of the British government's Animal Procedures Committee for eight years, and has worked as a consultant on non-animal techniques for the European Commission, and for animal protection organizations in Europe and the United States. Between 2010 and 2016 she was a consultant for Humane Society International.

Langley is the author of Vegan Nutrition (1988), and editor of Animal Experimentation: The Consensus Changes (1990). She has written a number of reports for the British Union for the Abolition of Vivisection and the European Coalition to End Animal Experiments, including Faith, Hope & Charity? An Enquiry into Charity-Funded Research (1988), and Next of Kin (2006), an examination of primate experimentation. She has also published articles and reviews in scientific journals about human species-specific research approaches.

== Education ==
Langley obtained an MA in physiology, cell biology, and zoology at the University of Cambridge, then earned her PhD in neurochemistry, also from Cambridge. She took up a position as a research fellow at the University of Nottingham, specialising in neurochemistry using human cell cultures.

== Involvement in animal protection ==
Langley was trained as an animal researcher but after reading Peter Singer's Animal Liberation she became a vegan and an animal rights activist, and campaigned professionally against animal experiments. She was a member of the Animal Procedures Committee for eight years, which advises the British Home Office on issues related to animal testing, and has acted as an advisor to the government on the introduction of the new European Union chemicals legislation, REACH. She has served as a specialist consultant for the European Commission and the Organisation for Economic Co-operation and Development (OECD). She was called as an expert witness in 2001 by the House of Lords Select Committee on Animals in Scientific Procedures during its inquiry into animal experimentation in the UK.

In April 2006, she was a member of the panel at the Oxford Union that debated whether "This house would not test on animals." Opposing the motion were Laurie Pycroft—who founded Pro-Test, which organised the debate—Sir Colin Blakemore, Professor John Stein, and Professor Lord Robert Winston. Supporting the motion, along with Langley, were Dr Andrew Knight, Uri Geller and BUAV campaigns director Alistair Currie. The motion was defeated by 273 to 48.

=== Position on animal research ===
Langley is an anti-vivisectionist and vegan. She told The Guardian that she "would never claim that all animal experiments are without scientific value. " She argues that the ethical case against animal research is absolute and that medical progress will benefit from 21st-century, human-relevant tools being used in place of animal experiments. This transition urgently requires funding and policy changes. She told the BBC: "When you know that other animals can feel pain and distress in the same ways that humans do, it is unethical to experiment on them."

She has campaigned against the use of non-human primates in xenotransplantation, where pig organs were grafted onto the necks of primates to test anti-rejection drugs. She told medical journalists Jenny Bryan and John Clare that the primates used in xenotransplantation research are subjected to major surgery; internal haemorrhages; isolation in small cages; repeated blood sampling; wound infections; nausea, vomiting and diarrhoea because of immunosuppressant drugs; kidney or heart failure, and eventually death. She said:

"It's not just the suffering they endure in the laboratories and research establishments. Just getting there can be torture. Studies of primates show them to have complex mental abilities which may increase their capacity to suffer. Supplying the laboratories in the UK imposes huge suffering on the animals... They're then contained in small, single cages, and transported for very long distances causing deaths, distress and suffering."

=== Next of Kin ===
Langley's report against primate experimentation, Next of Kin (2006), was published simultaneously with the publication by the Medical Research Council and the Wellcome Trust in favor of primate experimentation. The New Scientist wrote that her report cited studies suggesting that macaques and other small monkeys are more conscious of themselves and others than was previously believed, giving them a moral status equivalent to that of great apes, who are currently not used in experiments in the UK. David Morton, professor of Biomedical Science & Ethics at the University of Birmingham, said the report was "a wake-up call to scientists to raise their game in their justification and ways they use non-human primates in research."

== Publications ==
- Next of Kin: A Report on the Use of Primates in Experiments, British Union for the Abolition of Vivisection and European Coalition to End Animal Experiments (ECEAE), 2006.
- Vegan Nutrition. The Vegan Society, 1988. ISBN 0-907337-18-X
- Animal Experimentation: The Consensus Changes. MacMillan, 1989. ISBN 0-412-02411-X
- "Plea for a Sensitive Science" in Animal Experimentation: The Consensus Changes. MacMillan, 1989
- Acute Toxicity Testing Without Animals, ECEAE, 2005.
- Endocrine Disrupting Chemicals – A Non-animal Testing Approach, Green Party, 2004.
- "Chemical Safety & Animal Testing: A Regulatory Smokescreen?", ECEAE, 2004.
- The Way Forward: Strategy for a Future Chemicals Policy, (Part 1), Part 2, ECEAE, 2004.
- Towards a 21st-century roadmap for biomedical research and drug discovery: consensus report and recommendations, Drug Discovery Today, (2016). DOI: 10.1016/j.drudis.2016.10.011

== See also ==
- List of animal rights advocates
