= AFMA =

AFMA may refer to:

- AdSense for Mobile Applications
- Air Force Manpower Agency
- American Film Marketing Association, now called the Independent Film and Television Alliance
- Americans For Medical Advancement
- Australian Financial Markets Association
- Australian Fisheries Management Authority
- Australian Football Media Association
- Autofocus Micro-Adjustment, a focus calibration feature of some Canon cameras
- Arizona Fire and Medical Authority
