= The People's Petition =

Online campaign supporting medical animal testing

The People's Petition was an online campaign to express support for medical experimentation using animals in the United Kingdom. Within a year of launch the number of signatures exceeded 21,850 and included Tony Blair, the then-serving Prime Minister.

== Purpose ==
Launched on 20 April 2006 by the Coalition for Medical Progress, a broad alliance that includes pharmaceutical companies and research agencies, the petition was proposed by a member of the public to represent the "silent majority who accept the need for animal studies". David Taylor stated that, as neither a scientist nor doctor, he wanted a way "to show people who carry out medical research that I value and support their work."

The petition offered the opportunity for individuals of any age or place of residence to express support for three assertions:

- Medical research is essential for developing safe and effective medical and veterinary treatments, requiring some studies using animals.
- Where there is no alternative available, medical research using animals should continue in the UK.
- People involved in medical research using animals have a right to work and live without fear of intimidation or attack.

== Response ==
By 13 May, the petition had recorded 13,000 signatures. The following day, in the wake of publicity around a number of acts of intimidation by animal rights activists, then British Prime Minister Tony Blair announced in the Sunday Telegraph, that he intended to add his name to the petition. As an unusual move for a serving politician, Blair described his intention as "a sign of just how important I believe it is that as many people as possible stand up against the tiny group of extremists threatening medical research and advances in [the UK]."

Animal rights groups criticised Blair's actions; the National Anti-Vivisection Society calling it "hugely irresponsible". The British Union for the Abolition of Vivisection praised Blair's stance in tackling extremists, but expressed concern that he was "blindly backing the animal experimenters" practising "outmoded science."

Blair's announcement also drew praise, however. Jean-Pierre Garnier, chief executive of GlaxoSmithKline, stated he was encouraged by Blair's "personal commitment" and Colin Blakemore, chief executive of the Medical Research Council, thanked Blair "on behalf of medical researchers, who live in fear of such intimidation."

Other notable signatories include Caroline Flint and Tom Brake, both MPs, and Polly Toynbee. As of the end of 2006, the number of signatures exceeded 21,850.

== See also ==
- Animal liberation movement
- Animal rights
- Animal testing
- Medical research
- Pro-Test
- Stop Huntingdon Animal Cruelty
- Vivisection
