= John Porter (Illinois politician) =

American politician (1935–2022)

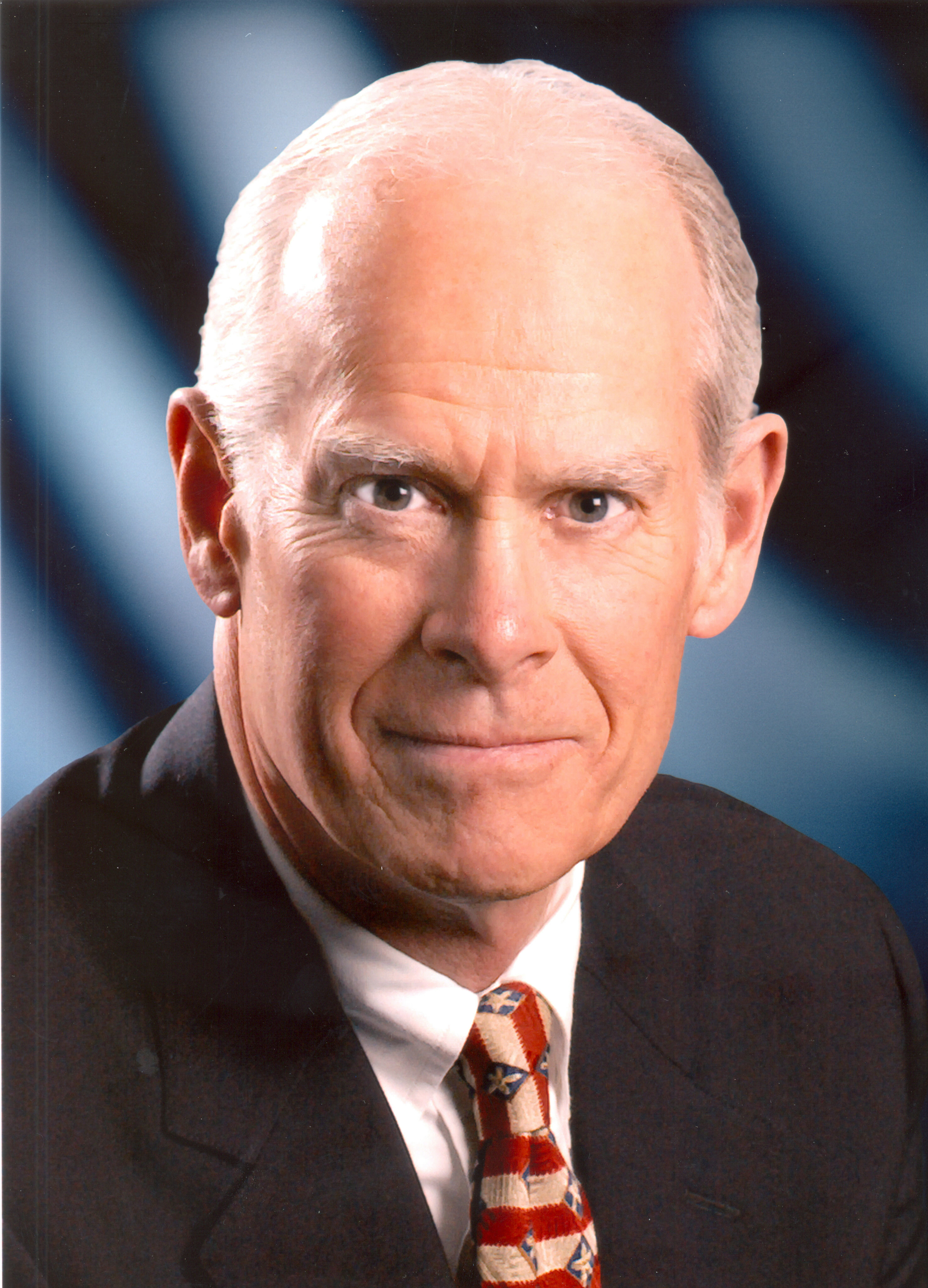

Member of the U.S. House of Representatives from Illinois's 10th district
- In office January 22, 1980 – January 3, 2001
- Preceded by: Abner Mikva
- Succeeded by: Mark Kirk

Member of the Illinois House of Representatives from the 1st district
- In office January 1973 – January 1979
- Preceded by: multi-member district
- Succeeded by: multi-member district

Personal details
- Born: John Edward Porter; June 1, 1935 Evanston, Illinois, U.S.
- Died: June 3, 2022 (aged 87) Fairfax County, Virginia, U.S.
- Party: Republican
- Education: Massachusetts Institute of Technology; Northwestern University (BA); University of Michigan, Ann Arbor (JD)

Military service
- Branch/service: United States Army Reserve
- Years of service: 1958–1964

John Edward Porter (June 1, 1935 – June 3, 2022) was an American lawyer and politician who served as a U.S. representative for Illinois's 10th congressional district from 1980 to 2001.

== Career before Congress ==
Before his election to Congress, Porter served in the Illinois House of Representatives and prior to that as an Honor Law Graduate Attorney with the U.S. Department of Justice in the Kennedy Administration. He attended Massachusetts Institute of Technology and was a graduate of Northwestern University and, with distinction of the University of Michigan Law School. Porter had ten honorary degrees.

== Tenure ==
During his tenure, Porter served on the United States House Committee on Appropriations and as chair of the Appropriations Subcommittee on Labor, Health and Human Services, Education, and Related Agencies. Under his subcommittee’s jurisdiction were all the health programs and agencies, including National Institutes of Health (NIH) and Centers for Disease Control and Prevention (CDC), except U.S. Food and Drug Administration (FDA) and all of the education programs and agencies of the federal government. During his chairmanship he led efforts resulting in doubling funding for the NIH.

He was founder and Co-Chairman of the Congressional Human Rights Caucus, a voluntary association of more than 250 Members of Congress working to identify, monitor, and end human rights violations worldwide. He co-authored legislation creating Radio Free Asia and served as chair of the Global Legislators Organized for a Balanced Environment (GLOBE USA).

== Later life ==
He was a partner and served as Senior Advisor to the international lawfirm Hogan Lovells. He served as Research!America Chair Emeritus and was Vice-Chair of the Foundation for the National Institutes of Health. He was member of the National Academy of Medicine and for 32 years, was a member of the Council on Foreign Relations. Porter was also a member of the Inter-American Dialogue. He was Chairman of PBS, a trustee of the Brookings Institution and served on the boards of the RAND Corporation, the American Heart Association, the PBS Foundation, and the John F. Kennedy Center for the Performing Arts. Among over 275 awards for his service in Congress is the Mary Wood Lasker Award for Public Service. In 2014, he was awarded the Public Welfare Medal from the National Academy of Sciences.

Porter was a resident of Alexandria, Virginia.

=== Death ===
He died from pneumonia at a hospital in Fairfax County, Virginia, on June 3, 2022, two days after his 87th birthday.

== Legacy ==
The 84,500 square foot John Edward Porter Neuroscience Research Center on the campus of the National Institutes of Health is named in his honor. It was dedicated on March 31, 2014. Porter is the 2014 recipient of the National Academy of Sciences Public Welfare Medal, the Academy’s highest honor.

== Involvement in science ==
In 2000, he was awarded The Mary Woodard Lasker Public Service Award "for wise and perceptive leadership on behalf of medical research funding and a deep commitment to strengthening the science enterprise." He has also received the Albert Sabin Hero of Science Award from Americans for Medical Progress for his consistent advocacy for medical research.

U.S. House of Representatives
Preceded by Abner Mikva	Member of the U.S. House of Representatives from Illinois's 10th congressional district 1980–2001	Succeeded by Mark Kirk
New office	Ranking Member of the House Human Rights Commission; 1983–1995	Succeeded by Tom Lantos
Preceded by Tom Lantos	Chair of the House Human Rights Commission; 1995–2001	Succeeded by Frank Wolf
