= SPEAK campaign =

British animal rights campaign

SPEAK
- Founded: 2003; 23 years ago
- Founder: Mel Broughton
- Type: Leaderless resistance
- Purpose: Opposition to animal testing
- Region served: University of Oxford, England
- Website: speakcampaigns.org

SPEAK (formerly known as SPEAK campaign) is a British animal rights group working to end animal testing in the UK.

== History ==
In the early 2000s, SPEAC (Stop Primate Experiments at Cambridge) was formed by a coalition of animal rights groups to fight the construction of proposed laboratories by the University of Cambridge. In 2004, the university announced they would abandon building their proposed Primate Research Facility due to unacceptable financial risks resulting, in part, from the activities of protestors. The SPEAK campaign was a continuation and expansion of anti-vivisection efforts after the victory against Cambridge. "Migrating from Cambridge, the SPEAK campaign is to continue its role in the animal rights debate within the public and political arena through pro-active campaigning."

== Allegations of violence ==
SPEAK campaigns have been accompanied by acts of intimidation, incitement, and violence, usually claimed by the Animal Liberation Front (ALF). Robert Cogswell, co-founder of SPEAK, has said the campaign neither condones nor condemns the actions of the ALF.

Incidents have included an arson attack on Hertford College boathouse; an attack on Corpus Christi College sports pavilion (which was, apparently, confused with Christ Church property); sending threatening letters to building firms connected with the construction project, the vandalism of other firms connected with the university, and threatening violence against Oxford University staff and students.

In December 2007, SPEAK spokesman Mel Broughton was charged with conspiracy to blackmail, two counts of possessing an explosive substance, and two counts of having an article with intent to damage, in connection with arson attempts at Oxford's Queen's College and Templeton College. At his 2008 trial he was cleared of possessing an explosive substance with intent, but the court was unable to reach a decision on the other charges. In 2009 he was convicted of conspiracy to commit arson and sentenced to 10 years by the Crown Court. After Broughton's conviction it was reported that police had infiltrated the ALF. According to The Times, the documents obtained by the infiltrator showed the "ALF drew funding from - and often had the same leaders as - ostensibly peaceful groups such as Shac and Speak, an animal rights body in Oxford led by Broughton."

== Injunctions ==
In November 2004, Oxford University obtained an injunction against the groups SPEAK Campaigns, SHAC (Stop Huntingdon Animal Cruelty) and ALF (Animal Liberation Front). The injunction limited the size of protests and prohibited protesting or loitering within a certain distance from the university's grounds and the property of any of the contractors, university members, employees and their families, its shareholders, its contractor employees, shareholders and their families, and anyone who visits the research laboratory. It prohibited taking photographs of such people or their vehicles or speaking to them. The injunction followed mounting complaints from students, researchers and workers about the hours-long use of sirens and megaphones by SPEAK on an almost daily basis.

In May 2006, Oxford appealed to the High Court to extend the injunction after threats were made against the university by the ALF. The court ordered that the injunction be widened to extend the exclusion zone, ban the use of megaphones and afford greater protection to individuals supplying goods or service to the university. A request by Oxford to further restrict the number of protesters from 50 to 12 was denied.

In June 2006, Mel Broughton, Robin Webb, and Amanda King were among several animal rights activists who were awarded legal aid to challenge the injunction.

In October 2006, High Court judge Mr. Justice Irwin denied a request by ALF press officer Robin Webb to remove his name from the injunction citing he was not an ALF member but merely a supporter of the group. The judge said Webb was a " pivotal figure" in ALF and should be subject to an injunction, and that Webb was not a journalist but a propagandist who "echoed the threat from the ALF to the university", going "far beyond legitimate self expression".

In October 2006, after allegations were made on the SPEAK website, Oxford University won a further injunction, prohibiting SPEAK from publishing allegations about the identity of contractors.

== Advertising ruling against SPEAK ==
In 2006, SPEAK produced a brochure claiming that Sir Michael Rawlins, chairman of the National Institute for Clinical Excellence said "The animal testing regime ... is utterly futile." NICE objected that the statement was quoted out of context and misleading. In June, the UK Advertising Standards Authority investigated. SPEAK did not respond, but later told ASA by phone that they planned on distributing the remainder of the brochures. ASA upheld the complaint by NICE and ruled that the testimonial was misleading and that brochure breached CAP Code clauses for non-response, honesty, truthfulness, protection of privacy, testimonials and endorsements.

== Rival group: Pro-Test ==
In January 2006, a student group called Pro-Test was formed with the aim of countering SPEAK and defending the use of animals in biomedical research. Both groups called demonstrations in Oxford on February 25, 2006, resulting in about 700 Pro-Test supporters opposed by 200-300 from SPEAK.

== See also ==
- List of animal rights groups
