= Inotiv =

Contract research organization and laboratory animal sourcer

Inotiv, Inc.
- Type: Public company
- Traded as: Nasdaq: NOTV
- Industry: Pharmaceutical industry
- Founded: 1974; 52 years ago as Bioanalytical Systems
- Founder: Peter Kissinger
- Headquarters: Lafayette, Indiana, United States
- Key people: Robert W. Leasure, Jr., President & CEO Beth A. Taylor, CFO
- Services: Contract research organization
- Revenue: ▲US$513 million (2025)
- Operating income: ▲ -US$30 million (2025)
- Net income: ▲ -US$68 million (2025)
- Total assets: ▼US$771 million (2025)
- Total equity: ▼US$136 million (2025)
- Number of employees: 2,046 (2025)
- Website: www.inotiv.com

Inotiv, Inc. is a contract research organization headquartered in Lafayette, Indiana. The company operates two core business units: Discovery and Safety Assessment (DSA) and Research Models and Services (RMS). The CRS business unit offers drug development and environmental sciences services, including safety assessment, analytical, metabolism, CMC and regulatory consultancy for small molecule drug candidates, biotherapeutics, and biomedical devices. The RMS business unit provides research models (live animals), lab animal diets and bedding and support services.

The company has been criticized for its animal testing practices, most specifically animal testing on non-human primates, as well as on beagles. It has also been criticized for its laboratory animal sources. In 2022, the United States Department of Agriculture found multiple violations of the Animal Welfare Act of 1966 at the company's dog-breeding facility in Cumberland, Virginia, to which the company pleaded guilty, resulting in $35 million in fines. The company is accredited by AAALAC International.

== History ==
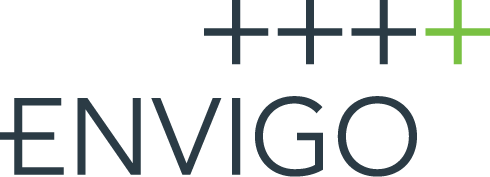
Envigo logo

Bioanalytical Systems, founded in 1974 by Purdue University chemistry professor Peter Kissinger, and Seventh Wave Laboratories merged in July 2018.

In March 2021, the company changed its name to Inotiv. The Inotiv brand had been launched in November 2019 for the company's contract research organization division.

In November 2021, Inotiv acquired Envigo. Envigo was formed in September 2015 by the merger of Huntingdon Life Sciences, Harlan Laboratories and three subsidiaries - GFA, NDA Analytics and LSR Associates. It became a public company via a merger with a special-purpose acquisition company in August 2017. In June 2019, it acquired the research products business of Fortrea, which acquired the nonclinical contract research services business of the company. In December 2019, it acquired the unit of Horizon Discovery that provides animals with clinically relevant gene deletions, insertions and other modifications for testing.

In January 2022, the company acquired Integrated Laboratory Systems for $56 million.

In February 2022, the company acquired Orient BioResource Center, a preclinical contract research organization and animal model supplier for $51 million.

In August 2023, the company sold its Israeli business to Harlan Holdings for $3.7 million.

In August 2025, the company was the victim of a ransomware attack by Russian cybercrime syndicate Qilin.

In June 2026, Inotiv filed for Chapter 11 bankruptcy protection.

== Criticism ==
=== Animal welfare issues ===
==== Treatment of beagles at facility in Cumberland, Virginia ====
The company owned and operated a research and breeding facility in Cumberland, Virginia that housed over 5,000 beagles, bred and sold for medical research. In 2019, PETA conducted an undercover investigation at the facility. After a routine inspection in July 2021, USDA inspectors cited the company for 26 violations of the Animal Welfare Act of 1966. After an inspection in October 2021, inspectors cited the company for 13 violations, including 11 repeat violations. Inspectors noted in their reports that the dogs had inadequate food and water and veterinary care, more than 500 dogs were experiencing pain and discomfort, being left in 85-degree heat without air conditioning for up to five hours, and infrequent cleaning left kennels and feeders hounded by insects. A dog was found with a mammary tumor the size of an orange. More than a dozen dogs were found to have paw and eye injuries, as well as some with "severe dental disease". Over a seven-month period, more than 300 puppies died from "unknown causes", and the facility had kept unfinished records regarding their deaths. Nursing beagles were denied adequate food, and puppies were euthanized without anesthesia. "Investigators observed "widespread fighting" between beagles sharing food sources ... [and] beagles fighting between adjacent cages ... In multiple enclosures, puppies were unable to access the spigots to get water on their own, and when the investigator 'held down the spigot to release water,' the puppies 'immediately rushed to the spigot to get water and drank heavily and quickly.'" Investigators also found numerous beagles trapped in cage floors, one whose jaw was stuck in the cage bars, and unhygienic conditions including insects, mold and a buildup of old food.

As a result of these reports and undercover investigations by local news WRIC-TV and PETA, three bills were introduced in Virginia to tighten regulation and subject employees to criminal liability in January 2022; one of such bills passed in April 2022.

After an inspection on March 8, 2022, found five repeat violations, including unsafe conditions, animal injuries, and mold and feces in the food supply, Virginia Senators Mark Warner and Tim Kaine sent a letter to the USDA requesting that the facility's license be temporarily revoked.

The United States Department of Justice filed a complaint against the company in federal district court on May 19, 2022, seeking an injunction to stop the company from breeding, selling, or otherwise dealing in beagles at the facility. U.S. District Court Judge Norman K. Moon granted the injunction. The government also seized nearly 150 beagles from the site that were in desperate need of medical treatment denied by the company.

In a settlement reached in July 2022, the company agreed to no longer engage in activities at the Cumberland site that require an Animal Welfare Act license and to relinquish the nearly 4,000 beagles at the facility to the Humane Society of the United States. The company was also ordered to pay a portion of the adoption costs. The remainder of the costs were covered by dog rescue charities. This represented the largest animal welfare seizure in the history of the Humane Society. The Humane Society transported the dogs to a network of shelters across the United States and by September 1, 2022, all of the dogs had been adopted. One of the beagles was adopted by Meghan, Duchess of Sussex and Prince Harry, Duke of Sussex. Another rescued puppy was adopted by New Jersey Governor Phil Murphy and is now the First Dog of New Jersey.

In June 2024, the company pleaded guilty to conspiring to violate the Animal Welfare Act of 1966 and conspiring to violate the Clean Water Act, agreeing to pay $22 million in fines, including the largest-ever fine imposed by the Department of Justice in an animal welfare case, as well as agreeing to pay an additional $13.5 million toward animal welfare and environmental projects, law enforcement expenses, and improvements to facilities.

=== Alleged illegal importation of monkeys ===
In August 2023, the U.S. Securities and Exchange Commission investigated the company for possible violations of the Foreign Corrupt Practices Act for knowingly using monkeys that were illegally captured in national parks and protected wild habitats.
