= Laboratory animal suppliers in the United Kingdom =

Laboratory animal suppliers in the United Kingdom breed animals such as rodents, rabbits, dogs, cats and primates which they sell to licensed establishments for scientific experimentation. Many have found themselves at the centre of animal rights protests against animal testing.

Campaign methods have included leafleting, demonstrations, verbal and physical intimidation, false accusations of criminal activity such as paedophilia, destruction of property, arson, the use of explosive devices and a grave-robbing.

Many smaller breeders have gone out of business, concentrating the market around larger international companies, such as Charles River Laboratories.

After Shamrock Farm closed in 2000, there were no commercial importers of laboratory primates left in the UK. To address this shortage, Cambridge University planned to build Europe's largest primate facility. However, they withdrew their plans following a concerted campaign by animal rights activists.

In 2004, the trend was for companies that experiment on animals to threaten to pull out of the UK.
