= Vivisection =

Experimental surgery

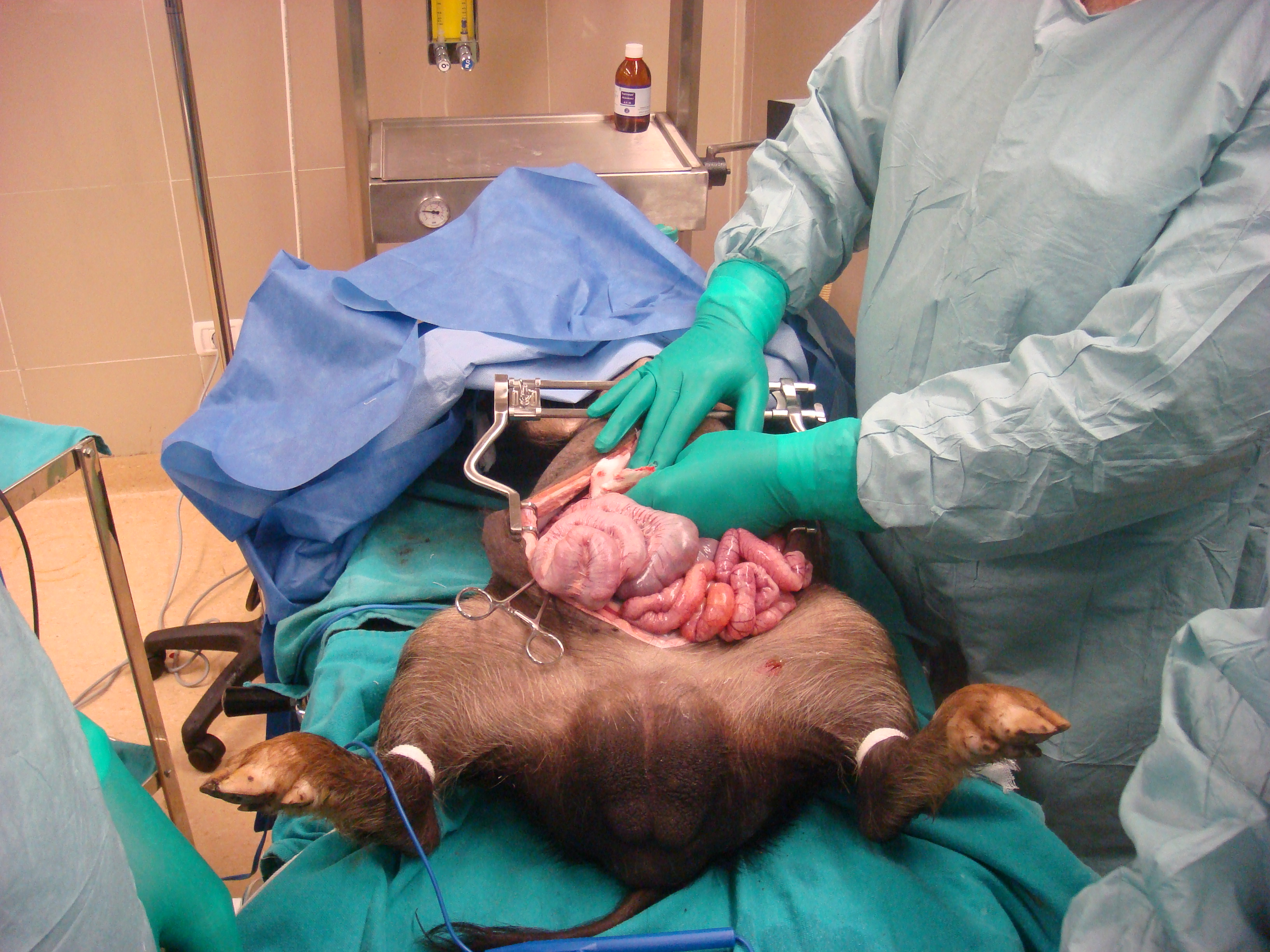
An anesthetized pig used for training a surgeon

Vivisection (from Latin vivus 'alive' and sectio 'cutting') is surgery conducted for experimental purposes on a living organism, typically animals with a central nervous system, to view living internal structure. The word is, more broadly, used as a pejorative catch-all term for experimentation on live animals by organizations opposed to animal experimentation, but the term is rarely used by practicing scientists. Human vivisection, such as live organ harvesting, has been perpetrated as a form of torture.

== Animal vivisection ==
=== Regulations and laws ===
Research requiring vivisection techniques that cannot be met through other means is often subject to an external ethics review in conception and implementation, and in many jurisdictions use of anesthesia is legally mandated for any surgery likely to cause pain to any vertebrate.

In the United States, the Animal Welfare Act explicitly requires that any procedure that may cause pain use "tranquilizers, analgesics, and anesthetics" with exceptions when "scientifically necessary". The act does not define "scientific necessity" or regulate specific scientific procedures, but approval or rejection of individual techniques in each federally funded lab is determined on a case-by-case basis by the Institutional Animal Care and Use Committee, which contains at least one veterinarian, one scientist, one non-scientist, and one other individual from outside the university.

In the United Kingdom, any experiment involving vivisection must be licensed by the Home Secretary. The Animals (Scientific Procedures) Act 1986 "expressly directs that, in determining whether to grant a licence for an experimental project, 'the Secretary of State shall weigh the likely adverse effects on the animals concerned against the benefit likely to accrue.'"

In Australia, the Code of Practice "requires that all experiments must be approved by an Animal Experimentation Ethics Committee" that includes a "person with an interest in animal welfare who is not employed by the institution conducting the experiment, and an additional independent person not involved in animal experimentation."

=== Anti-vivisection movement ===
Anti-vivisectionists have played roles in the emergence of the animal welfare and animal rights movements, arguing that animals and humans have the same natural rights as living creatures, and that it is inherently immoral to inflict pain or injury on another living creature, regardless of the purpose or potential benefit to mankind.

==== 19th century ====
At the turn of the 19th century, medicine was undergoing a transformation, which was visible through the emergence of hospitals and the development of more advanced medical tools such as the stethoscope. There was also an increased recognition that medical practices needed to be improved, as many of the current therapeutics were based on unproven, traditional theories that may or may not have helped the patient recover. The demand for more effective treatment shifted emphasis to research with the goal of understanding disease mechanisms and anatomy. This shift had a few effects, one of which was the rise in patient experimentation, leading to some moral questions about what was acceptable in clinical trials and what was not. An easy solution to the moral problem was to use animals in vivisection experiments, so as not to endanger human patients. This, however, had its own set of moral obstacles, leading to the anti-vivisection movement.

===== François Magendie (1783–1855) =====
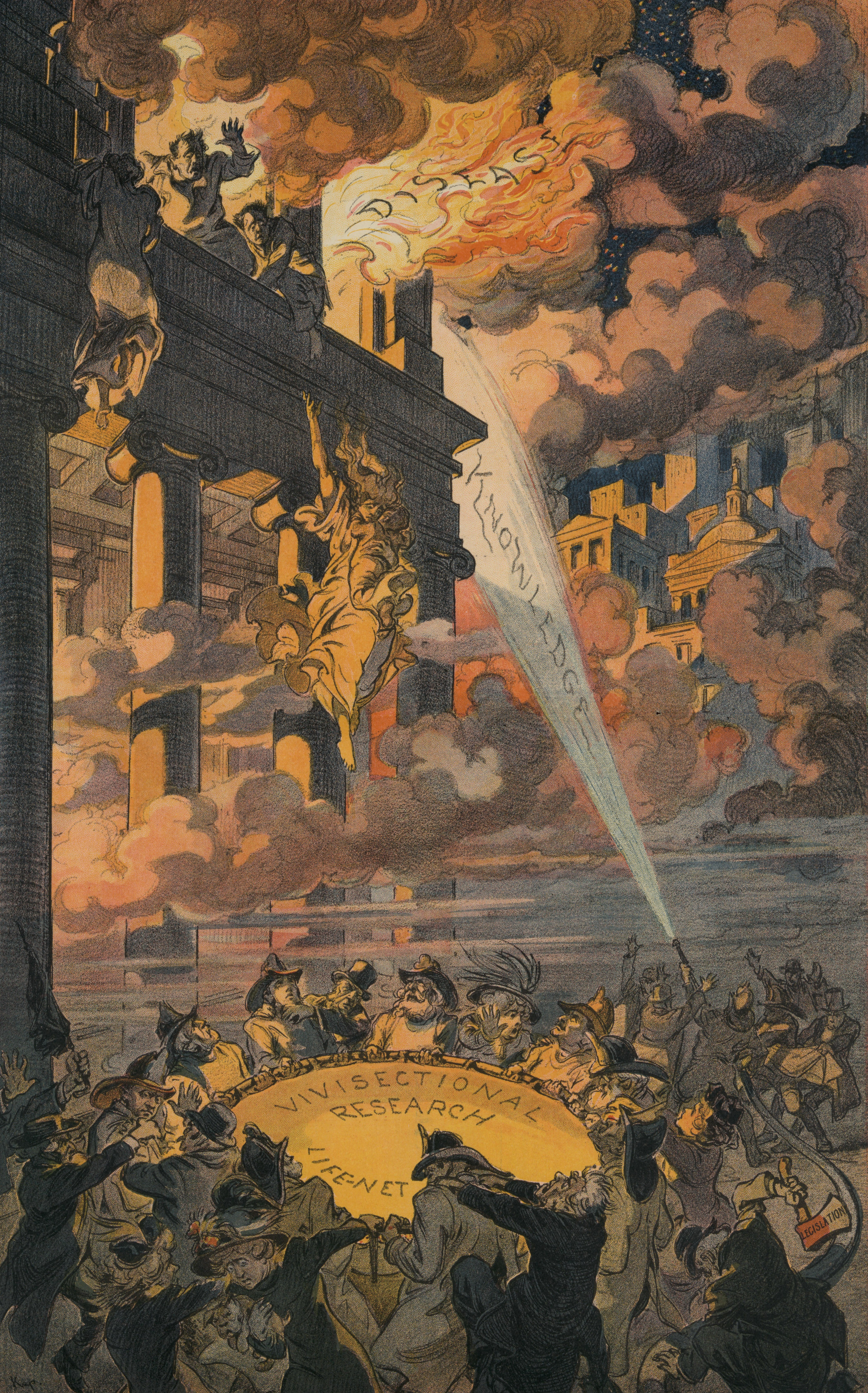
Pro-vivisection cartoon in 1911

One polarizing figure in the anti-vivisection movement was François Magendie. Magendie was a physiologist at the Académie Royale de Médecine in France, established in the first half of the 19th century. Magendie made several groundbreaking medical discoveries, but was far more aggressive than some of his contemporaries in the use of animal experimentation. For example, the discovery of the different functionalities of dorsal and ventral spinal nerve roots was achieved by both Magendie, as well as a Scottish anatomist named Charles Bell. Bell used an unconscious rabbit because of "the protracted cruelty of the dissection", which caused him to miss that the dorsal roots were also responsible for sensory information. Magendie, on the other hand, used conscious, six-week-old puppies for his own experiments. While Magendie's approach would today be considered an abuse of animal rights, both Bell and Magendie used the same rationalization for vivisection: the cost of animal experimentation being worth it for the benefit of humanity.

Many viewed Magendie's work as cruel and unnecessarily torturous. One note is that Magendie carried out many of his experiments before the advent of anesthesia, but even after ether was discovered it was not used in any of his experiments or classes. Even during the period before anesthesia, other physiologists expressed their disgust with how he conducted his work. One such visiting American physiologist describes the animals as "victims" and the apparent sadism that Magendie displayed when teaching his classes. Magendie's experiments were cited in the drafting of the British Cruelty to Animals Act 1876 and Cruel Treatment of Cattle Act 1822, otherwise known as Martin's Act. The latter bill's namesake, Irish MP and well known anti-cruelty campaigner Richard Martin, called Magendie a "disgrace to Society" and his public vivisections "anatomical theatres" following a prolonged dissection of a greyhound which attracted wide public comment. Magendie faced widespread opposition in British society, among the general public but also his contemporaries, including William Sharpey who described his experiments aside from cruel as "purposeless" and "without sufficient object", a feeling he claimed was shared among other physiologists.

===== David Ferrier and the Cruelty to Animals Act 1876 =====
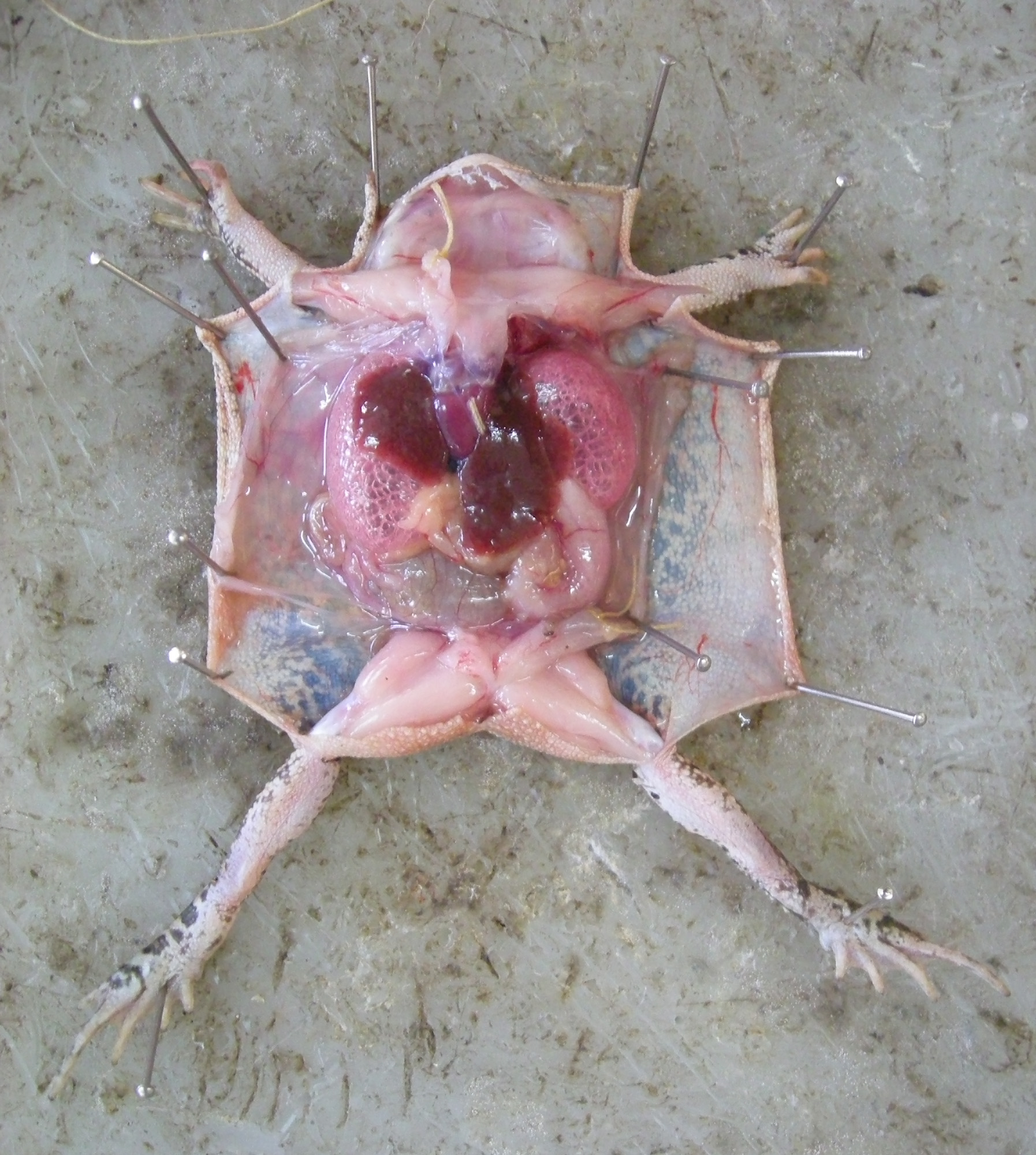
Prior to vivisection for educational purposes, chloroform was administered as an anesthetic to this common sand frog.

The Cruelty to Animals Act, 1876 in Britain determined that one could only conduct vivisection on animals with the appropriate license from the state, and that the work the physiologist was doing had to be original and absolutely necessary. The stage was set for such legislation by physiologist David Ferrier. Ferrier was a pioneer in understanding the brain and used animals to show that certain locales of the brain corresponded to bodily movement elsewhere in the body in 1873. He put these animals to sleep, and caused them to move unconsciously with a probe. Ferrier was successful, but many decried his use of animals in his experiments. Some of these arguments came from a religious standpoint. Some were concerned that Ferrier's experiments would separate God from the mind of man in the name of science. Some of the anti-vivisection movement in England had its roots in Evangelicalism and Quakerism. These religions already had a distrust for science, only intensified by the recent publishing of Darwin's Theory of Evolution in 1859.

Neither side was pleased with how the Cruelty to Animals Act 1876 was passed. The scientific community felt as though the government was restricting their ability to compete with the quickly advancing France and Germany with new regulations. The anti-vivisection movement was also unhappy, but because they believed that it was a concession to scientists for allowing vivisection to continue at all. Ferrier would continue to vex the anti-vivisection movement in Britain with his experiments when he had a debate with his German opponent, Friedrich Goltz. They would effectively enter the vivisection arena, with Ferrier presenting a monkey, and Goltz presenting a dog, both of which had already been operated on. Ferrier won the debate, but did not have a license, leading the anti-vivisection movement to sue him in 1881. Ferrier was not found guilty, as his assistant was the one operating, and his assistant did have a license. Ferrier and his practices gained public support, leaving the anti-vivisection movement scrambling. They made the moral argument that given recent developments, scientists would venture into more extreme practices to operating on "the cripple, the mute, the idiot, the convict, the pauper, to enhance the 'interest' of [the physiologist's] experiments".

==== 20th century ====
In the early 20th century the anti-vivisection movement attracted many female supporters associated with women's suffrage. The American Anti-Vivisection Society advocated total abolition of vivisection whilst others such as the American Society for the Regulation of Vivisection wanted better regulation subjected to surveillance, not full prohibition. The Research Defence Society made up of a group of physiologists was founded in 1908 to defend vivisection. In the 1920s, anti-vivisectionists exerted significant influence over the editorial decisions of medical journals.

== Human vivisection ==
It is possible that human vivisection was practised by some Greek anatomists in Alexandria in the 3rd century BCE. Celsus in De Medicina states that Herophilos of Alexandria vivisected some criminals sent by the king. The early Christian writer Tertullian states that Herophilos vivisected at least 600 live prisoners, although the accuracy of this claim is disputed by many historians.

In the 12th century CE, Andalusian Arab Ibn Tufail elaborated on human vivisection in his treatise called Hayy ibn Yaqzan. In an extensive article on the subject, Iranian academic Nadia Maftouni believes him to be among the early supporters of autopsy and vivisection.

Unit 731, a biological and chemical warfare research and development unit of the Imperial Japanese Army, undertook lethal human experimentation during the period that comprised both the Second Sino-Japanese War and the Second World War (1937–1945). In the Filipino island of Mindanao, Moro Muslim prisoners of war were subjected to various forms of vivisection by the Japanese, in many cases without anesthesia.

Nazi human experimentation involved many medical experiments on live subjects, such as vivisections by Josef Mengele, usually without anesthesia.

== See also ==
- Alternatives to animal testing
- American Anti-Vivisection Society
- Animal testing regulations
- Bionics
- Cruelty to animals
- Dissection
- Experimentation on prisoners, including vivisection
- History of animal testing
- Human subject research
- Intrinsic value (animal ethics)
- Lingchi, an execution method in Imperial China
- New England Anti-Vivisection Society
- Pro-Test
- Speaking of Research
