= AAALAC International =

U.S. nonprofit organization

AAALAC International is a private, nonprofit organization headquartered in Frederick, Maryland, that promotes the humane treatment of animals in science through voluntary accreditation and assessment programs. The accreditation program started in 1965, when some veterinarians and researchers organized the American Association for Accreditation of Laboratory Animal Care, or AAALAC. In 1996, AAALAC changed its name to the Association for Assessment and Accreditation of Laboratory Animal Care International (AAALAC International). The organization said the name change reflected the organization's growth in other countries and its commitment to enhancing life sciences and quality animal care around the world. Since 2016, the organization is officially known only by its acronym, AAALAC International. There are currently about 1,000 organizations worldwide accredited through its program.

Along with meeting all applicable local and national regulations, AAALAC accredited institutions must also demonstrate that they are achieving the standards outlined in the Guide for the Care and Use of Laboratory Animals, a document published since 1996 by the National Research Council of the U.S. National Academy of Sciences. The Guide includes standards go beyond what is required by law.

== See also ==
- Animal welfare
- Animal testing
- American Association for Laboratory Animal Science, a U.S. nonprofit organization
- Animal Welfare Act of 1966, a U.S. law
- Food Security Act of 1985, a U.S. law
- In vivo
