= Speaking of Research =

Group avocating for animal research when necessary in science

- Founded: March 2008
- Founder: Tom Holder
- Type: Advocacy group
- Purpose: Support for animal research
- Website: speakingofresearch.com

Speaking of Research (SR) is an international group which "aims to provide accurate information about the importance of animal research in medical and veterinary science". It was founded in March 2008 by Tom Holder, an "energetic young British activist who played an active role in the Pro-Test movement at the University of Oxford," who moved to the US for the purpose of setting up such a group. Holder had previously been a spokesman for Pro-Test, as well as acting as emcee for their three demonstrations.

Speaking of Research state their aims are to "change the tide of the controversial animal rights debate by encouraging students and scientists to speak out in favor of the lifesaving research developed with animals." Their launch came during a period of increased direct action in the US. Since 2007, a number of researchers from the University of California system have had their homes attacked by animal rights activists, including one University of California, Santa Cruz(UCSC) researcher whose residence was invaded by six masked activists on February 24, 2008. According to the journal Science, the group also aims to "[work] with public schools to counter information from groups such as People for the Ethical Treatment of Animals."

Speaking of Research's launch was jointly supported by both Pro-Test in the UK, and Americans for Medical Progress in the US. In 2014/15, its running costs were approximately $150 and paid by small donations from supporters. Its committee is made up primarily of researchers and veterinary technicians, including members of UCLA Pro-Test such as Dr. David Jentsch.

During "World Week for Animals in Laboratories (2008)," Holder traveled to West Coast universities including UCLA, Berkeley, Oregon Health & Sciences University, and the University of Washington to speak about the role of animals in biomedical research. Speaking of Research have supported pro-animal research movements around the world including "Pro-Test for Science" (in the US) and "Pro-Test Italia" (in Italy). Their committee includes individuals from the US, Canada, UK, Portugal and Italy.

Speaking of Research have long been a proponent of greater transparency and openness in animal research. In February 2016 they analyzed the position statements of over 200 research institutions in Europe and North America, concluding that most did not meet the highest standards of openness. To be included on the list, an organization must "at minimum maintain a public web page with a position statement on animal research". As of April 2018, the organization had analyzed 378 position statements, awarding only 27 of them with full marks. Speaking of Research were among the first organisations to criticise the USDA for removing animal welfare reports and documents from the website in February 2017. The USDA has subsequently begun to return many of these documents to the website.

In 2018, Speaking of Research launched a Rapid Response Network with the aim to "engage scientists by prompting them to send letters or sign petitions in support of animal research". The first action was a letter to USA Today signed by almost 600 scientists, veterinarians, animal technicians and other members of the American scientific community, including four Nobel Prize Winners, calling on the "country’s research institutions — large and small — to embrace openness [and] proudly explain how animals are used for the advancement of science and medicine, in the interest of the wellbeing of humans and animals."

In August 2018, Holder stood down as Director and from the committee; currently all committee members are now active researchers.

== Pro-Test for Science ==
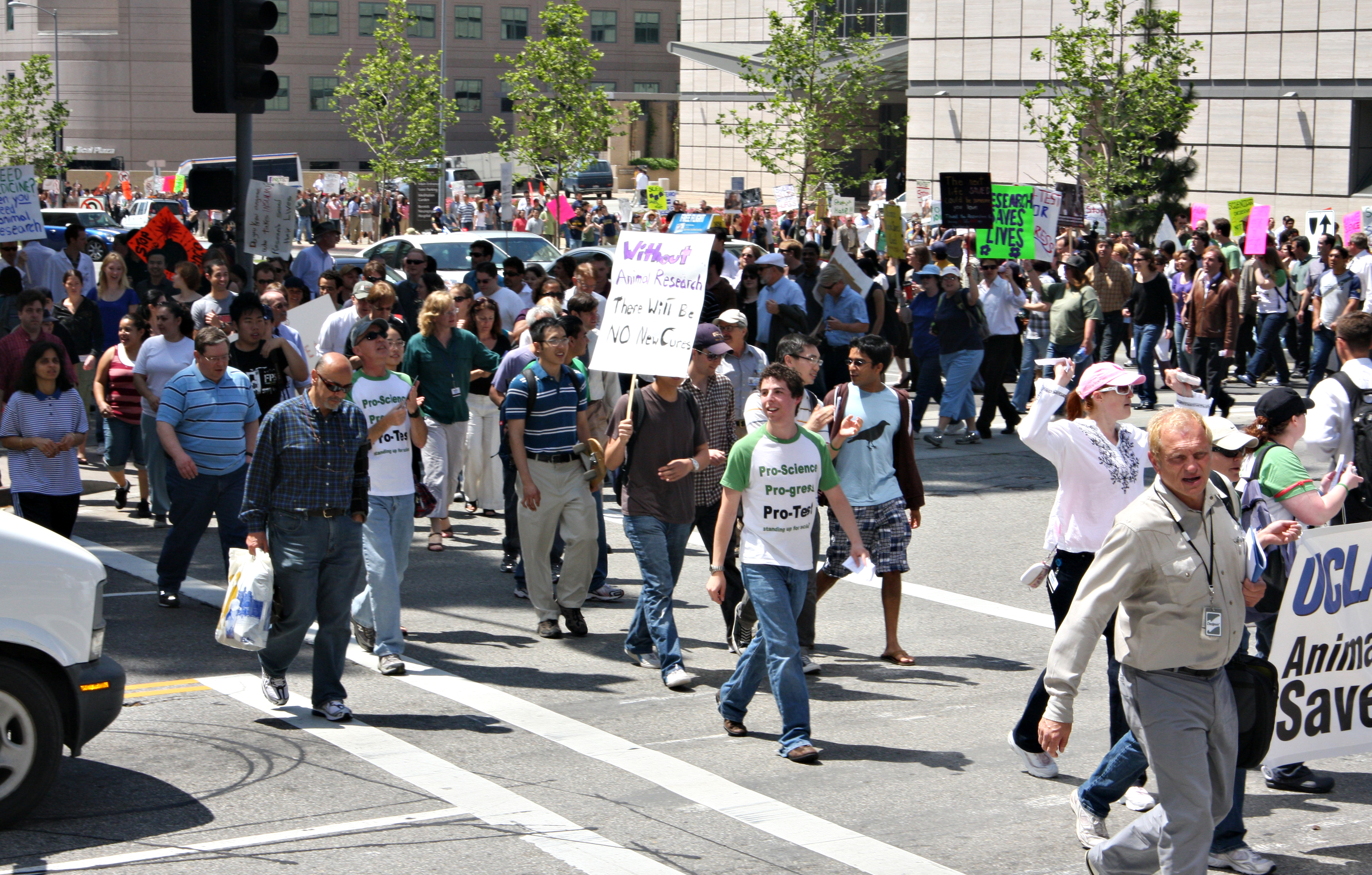
The UCLA Pro-Test rally on 22 July 2009, with Speaking of Research members participating

Speaking of Research offered its support to the UCLA Pro-Test movement (later renamed Pro-Test for Science), which was founded in March 2009, on the UCLA campus, with Holder playing a leadership role on the organizing committee. On 22 April 2009 more than 700 staff, students and Los Angeles residents, led by the neuroscientist David Jentsch, held a rally to launch the UCLA chapter of Pro-Test, and to stand up to the animal rights activists who had targeted Prof. Jentsch and other scientists in a campaign of harassment and arson. At the event, Tom Holder announced the launch of the Pro-Test Petition, which aimed to give people in the US the "opportunity to show [their] support for the scientists and [their] opposition to the use of threats and violence.

The Pro-Test Petition accumulated 11,600 signatures over 12 months, after gaining backing from a number of science organizations including the Society for Neuroscience. and American Physiological Society. The petition was signed by every chancellor in the University of California system and several Nobel Prize winners. At a second UCLA Pro-Test rally – by then, renamed Pro-Test for Science – the petition was handed to representatives from the National Institutes of Health.

In February 2012, two members of Speaking of Research and Pro-Test for Science, Prof. David Jentsch and Prof. Dario Ringach, won the 2011 AAAS Scientific Freedom and Responsibility Award for "their rare courage, their strong defense of the importance of the use of animals in research, and their refusal to remain silent in the face of intimidation by animal rights extremists."
