= Harlan (company) =

Laboratory supplier

Harlan Laboratories
- Company type: Private
- Industry: Biotechnology
- Founded: 1931
- Headquarters: Indianapolis, Indiana, United States
- Products: Research Models, Teklad Lab Animal Diets, Bedding and Enrichment Products, Surgical Services, Genetic Testing Services, Research Model Support Services, Biological Products and Antibody Production Services, Flexible Film Isolators, Transportation Services
- Services: Discovery services, Toxicology services, Genetic Toxicology services, Ecotoxicology services, Drug Metabolism and Pharmacokinetics, Regulatory Affairs, Consulting, Program Management, Analytical Chemistry, Chemical and Agrochemical Registration, Environmental Fate and Modeling, In Vitro Alternative Testing
- Website: Not online anymore

Harlan Sprague Dawley Inc. was a supplier of animals and other services to laboratories for the purpose of animal testing. It provided pre-clinical research tools and services for the pharmaceutical, biotechnology, agrochemicals, industrial chemical, and food industries.

Harlan offered products and services for the discovery and safety of new medicines and compounds, including research models and services, health monitoring reports, genetic monitoring reports, Teklad lab animal diets, bedding and enrichment products, surgical services, genetic testing services, research model support services, biological products and antibody production services, flexible film isolators, transportation services, and stock and strain elimination. It also provided contract research services, which comprised toxicology, environmental science, and regulatory services.

In 2013, Harlan expanded the availability of its contract breeding services from the United Kingdom and Southern Europe into Northern Europe through a partnership with BioXpert, an animal science and services company. In 2015 Harlan became part of Envigo.

== Harlan UK ==
Harlan UK Ltd. is the British arm of Harlan Sprague Dawley Inc. It has an annual turnover of £6.6 million, according to the British Union for the Abolition of Vivisection (BUAV). The company supplies marmosets, beagles, cats, rabbits, guinea pigs, rats, mice, gerbils, and hamsters, as well as hybrid, mutant, and transgenic animals. Its brochure says it supplies more stocks and strains of lab animals than any other commercial supplier in the world. BUAV writes that the company breeds around 450 baby marmoset monkeys a year, selling them to laboratories around Europe for £1,000 each.

== Animal welfare ==
Harlan Laboratories says it is "dedicated to the humane care and use of research animals". The IACUC and the company's veterinary staff manage policies and procedures to ensure that all animal use is performed in accordance with government and industry standards.

In the UK, The Sunday Times reported that beagles kept on a large farm were permitted only 20 minutes out of their cages per week because the company, "is exempt from the main animal welfare legislation which requires dogs to have daily exercise", and instead "adheres to a code of practice enforced by the Home Office". An ex-employee of Harlan told the Times that he was shown how to separate fighting dogs by "kicking and punching them". The company said they investigated the charge and found that "there were some inconsistencies between sites in the way the dogs were being separated during fighting".

Harlan has been a target of animal rights activists, and the group Animal Liberation Front has raided Harlan Interfauna removing animals and documents. For one raid in 1990, during which 82 beagles and 26 rabbits were taken, John Curtin and Danny Attwood were convicted and sentenced to nine months and 18 months in prison respectively.

In 2006, over 1,000 animals, including 25 macaque monkeys were removed from Harlan in Correzzana, Italy, with computers and equipment smashed, by the Animal Liberation Front in Italy.

== See also ==
- Laboratory animal suppliers in the United Kingdom
- Model organism
