= Humanimal Trust =

British veterinarian charity

The Humanimal Trust is a charity based in Godalming focused on One Medicine - driving collaboration between vets, doctors and researchers so that all humans and animals benefit from sustainable and equal medical progress but not at the expense of the life of an animal.

Professor Roberto La Ragione is the Chair of Trustees. Joe Bailey, former Head of Farming, Welfare, and Wellbeing for the Royal Society for the Prevention of Cruelty to Animals was appointed as the new chief executive in November 2022.

The trust argues that Healthcare can and should advance hand in hand and that a two-way street between human and veterinary medicine is both possible and necessary for humans and animals to benefit equitably from cutting edge advances. The Trust is focussed on 5 key areas:

- Infection and antibiotic resistance
- Cancer
- Spinal disease
- Musculoskeletal disease
- Regenerative medicine

The trust believes that advances in both human and animal medicine can be achieved more quickly, if there is closer collaboration and mutual learning, leading to progressively fewer laboratory animal tests until one day they become obsolete. Technological advances in the diagnosis and analysis of naturally occurring disease mean that for the first time in history the end point of the study of disease does not need to be death.

The Humanimal Trust believes that we all share responsibility for creating a fairer society, with better opportunities to benefit equitably from medical progress for humans and animals. If we miss this opportunity we will all pay the price in wasted time, wasted money and the wasted lives of both humans and animals. .

Noel Fitzpatrick, the founder, says the trust can help the cross-pollination of ideas between veterinary and human medicine and ensure that all humans and animals benefit from sustainable and equal medical progress. He says animals get better prosthetic limbs than humans and that vets are using new materials that the human field will adopt in due course. He gives lectures at human medical conferences and is doing a tour of the UK, including the Manchester Arena in the autumn of 2018 to raise money for the trust which is funding a PhD student in Scotland to study early biomarkers for prostate cancers as well as other ongoing research projects.

The trust funded a study published in the British Journal of Nursing of the use of therapy dogs in Southampton Children’s Hospital which showed that the dogs helped reduce anxiety among young patients awaiting medical tests, investigations and examinations. On the basis of this study the hospital called for a nationwide roll-out of the use of therapy dogs, and this call was supported by the Royal College of Nursing which has worked with the trust to develop protocols which would make it easier to bring therapy animals into hospitals.

At DogFest 2017 (also founded by Fitzpatrick and described as the canine Glastonbury) in Arley Hall Fitzpatrick organised a Great Dog Walk, where thousands of people, and their dogs, did a sponsored walk in aid of the trust.
