= American Association for Laboratory Animal Science =

Nonprofit trade association

The American Association for Laboratory Animal Science (AALAS) is a 501(c)(3) nonprofit membership association, established in 1950 as a forum for the exchange of information and expertise in the care and use of laboratory animals. Membership consists of approximately 12,000 individual, institutional, commercial and affiliate members. The national office is located in Memphis, TN.

== National meeting ==
Each fall since 1950, the American Association for Laboratory Animal Science has held its annual National Meeting. During the five days of the meeting, members and nonmembers participate in workshops, lectures, poster sessions, and exhibits. The program is designed to have topics relevant to the entire membership. Exhibitors have an opportunity to interact with AALAS members from the academic community, research institutions, government organizations, and commercial companies. Eight professional and technical awards for excellence in the field of laboratory animal science are given each year at the AALAS National Meeting. The AALAS National Meeting is the largest gathering in the world of professionals concerned with the production, care, and use of laboratory animals.

National AALAS is held in a different city in the United States each year.

Past meeting locations include:

2016: Charlotte, North Carolina

2017: Austin, Texas

2018: Baltimore, Maryland

2019: Denver, Colorado

2020: Virtual (was planned for Charlotte, North Carolina)

2021: Kansas City, Missouri

2022: Louisville, Kentucky

2023: Salt Lake City, Utah

2024: Nashville, Tennessee

2025: Long Beach, California

2026: Planned for Houston, Texas

== Publications ==
AALAS publishes two scientific journals, Comparative Medicine and the Journal of the American Association for Laboratory Animal Science, as well as a member magazine, Laboratory Animal Science Professional. Publications are produced in the AALAS national office in Memphis, TN.

=== Comparative Medicine ===
Comparative Medicine (CM), an international bi-monthly journal of comparative and experimental medicine, is the leading English-language publication in the field and is ranked by the Science Citation Index in the upper third of all scientific journals. It seeks to advance knowledge about comparative medicine and laboratory animal science through the publication of scholarly articles about animal models, animal biology, laboratory animal medicine, laboratory animal pathology, animal behavior, animal biotechnology, and related topics. The journal invites reports and reviews about basic and applied laboratory investigations, clinical investigations, and case studies. It also welcomes informed and thoughtful opinions relevant to the humane care and use of laboratory animals. Comparative Medicine is indexed in Index Medicus. Dr. Linda Toth of Southern Illinois University School of Medicine is the editor in chief over Comparative Medicine and JAALAS; Dr. Ravi Tolwani of The Rockefeller University is the associate editor for CM.

=== Journal of the American Association for Laboratory Animal Science ===
The Journal of the American Association for Laboratory Animal Science (JAALAS) serves as an official communication vehicle for the American Association for Laboratory Animal Science (AALAS). The journal, published bi-monthly, includes a section of refereed articles and a section of AALAS association news. The mission of the refereed section of the journal is to disseminate high-quality, peer-reviewed information on animal biology, technology, facility operations, management, and compliance as relevant to the AALAS membership. Reflecting this mission, the journal title has changed, effective with the first issue of 2006, from Contemporary Topics in Laboratory Animal Science (CT) to JAALAS. Dr. Linda Toth of Southern Illinois University School of Medicine is the editor in chief over Comparative Medicine and JAALAS; Dr. Susan Compton of Yale University is the associate editor for JAALAS.

=== Laboratory Animal Science Professional (LAS Pro) ===
LAS Pro is a quarterly magazine focusing on practical information, including the latest developments and strategies in laboratory animal science, such as management, professional development, occupational health and safety, facility design, and technologies. This publication addresses case studies and practical strategies for laboratory care professionals.

== Certification ==
The AALAS technician certification program certifies three levels of technical knowledge. The Technician Certification Registry is a voluntary program for technicians to demonstrate a current, credible level of knowledge. The Certified Manager of Animal Resources (CMAR) program is designed to raise competency and professionalism in the field of animal resources management.

=== Certified Manager of Animal Resources (CMAR) ===
The CMAR designation involves a series of four examinations: three exams arranged via an organization called the Institute for Certified Professional Managers (ICPM), and the Animal Resources Exam offered by AALAS. Obtaining the CMAR designation is a sign of professionalism in the field of animal resources management. In order to maintain their CMAR designation, CMAR recipients will have annual requirements of a re-certification fee and a specified number of continuing education credits to stay abreast of the latest in management techniques and theory.

=== Technician Certification ===
AALAS' Certification and Registry Board (CRB) certifies three levels of technician competence: Assistant Laboratory Animal Technician (ALAT), Laboratory Animal Technician (LAT), and Laboratory Animal Technologist (LATG). The technician certification designations of ALAT, LAT, and LATG are well known and widely used throughout the varied fields of laboratory animal care

== Institute for Laboratory Animal Management ==
The Institute for Laboratory Animal Management (ILAM) is an AALAS educational program developed to provide instruction in management concepts that is applicable to the laboratory animal science industry and to enhance communication, team building, and networking among colleagues with mutual interests. Directors, managers, and supervisors of laboratory animal facilities have seen their roles grow more and more complex over the years, and they have found themselves in a unique profession. People in management positions must be able to interpret the social, political, and economic environments in which they operate and use administrative and technical skills to maintain and improve their animal care and use programs. The vast majority of people in these positions was trained in biologic and veterinary sciences and must find additional training in management skills to fulfill their administrative roles.

== AALAS Learning Library ==
The AALAS Learning Library provides training that is essential for technicians, veterinarians, managers, IACUC members, and investigators working with animals in a research or education setting. Emphasizing the appropriate handling, care, and use of animals, the courses are designed to help people prepare for AALAS certification, meet training mandates of regulatory agencies, and improve their knowledge in technical areas.

== AALAS Foundation ==
The AALAS Foundation, a 501(c)(3) non-profit organization, provides funding for projects to promote the awareness of biomedical research and its contributions to society. AALAS, through the Foundation, provides a variety of public outreach tools in the form of flyers, posters, websites, videos and DVDs, and classroom materials.
