= Research Defence Society =

British scientific society and lobby group

- Headquarters: United Kingdom

The Research Defence Society was a British scientific society and lobby group founded by Stephen Paget in 1908 to fight against the anti-vivisectionist "enemies of reason" at the beginning of the 20th century. At the end of 2008, after being active for 100 years, it merged with the communications group Coalition for Medical Progress to form the advocacy group Understanding Animal Research.

The Research Defence Society's aim was to disseminate information about, and to defend the use of, research involving animals, including animal testing. It represented the interests of 5,000 researchers and institutions. Its sources of funding changed over the hundred years that the society was active, and included individuals, government, the pharmaceutical industry and universities. The organisation's literature stated that it was funded by its members, including medical scientists, doctors, veterinarians, pharmaceutical companies, research institutes, universities, and charities that support medical research.

Its last executive director was Dr. Simon Festing, who became CEO of Understanding Animal Research.

One campaign to demonstrate the support for animal research within the scientific and medical community was the co-signing of a petition in support of the use of animals in research called Declaration on Animals in Medical Research. The declaration was signed in 1990, and a modified version in 2005. Over 700 scientists, of whom 500 were British, signed the declaration in the first month, including three Nobel laureates, 190 Fellows of the Royal Society and the Medical Royal Colleges and over 250 academic professors.
