= Americans for Medical Advancement =

American patient advocacy organization

Americans for Medical Advancement (AFMA) is a not-for-profit, science-based, patient advocacy organization dedicated to improving healthcare through biomedical research. It was founded by Ray and Jean Greek.

The organization opposes the use of animals as causal analogical models, or predictive models, for human response, and argues that using animals as a basis for the human response to drugs is not a safe method of development. For example, efficacy testing, medical research, and ADMET (absorption, distribution, metabolism, elimination, and toxicity) are results from animal-based research that were assumed predictive for humans. The organization is relentlessly trying to have a peer reviewed debate with the animal researchers community on Trans Species Modelling Theory, in order for it to get accepted by the entire scientific community and get mainstream. The most trivial consequence of Trans Species Modelling Theory is a defunding of animal tests and a massive increase in funds for preclinical human based animal free research. AFMA is currently supporting the Parliamentary Early Day Motion 175 in UK, whose aim is a parliamentary peer reviewed scientific hearing on the validity of animal experiments when used to predict human response to drugs and disease

Americans for Medical Advancement conducts its experiments through critical thinking and the use of evolutionary biology, complexity science, genetics, and personalized medicine. None of these methods require testing on animals.

AFMA hopes to improve policy and decision-making regarding the use of the animal model in the testing of drugs and treatments for the safety of human use. The organization does not oppose the use of animals in other aspects of science, and stresses that it is not an animal rights group.

President, Ray Greek MD, says, “There are areas where animals are very useful in science and areas where they are not,” and that the organization “explores the differences between the two.” What sets it apart is that it focuses “on the harm that is done to humans” and that animal protectionists are concerned about the harm done to animals.

== Objectives ==
Americans for Medical Advancement targets their work to improve healthcare. The way the organization hopes to do so is by developing safer, more efficient techniques to use in labs. Since AFMA believes that animals do not give an accurate reading of how drugs will make a human react, the first step would be eliminating animal testing in the development of drugs and treatments meant for humans. As a result, drug development should be quicker and more affordable.

AFMA also wants to see medical research funding directed to more relevant areas of research that are often forgotten and not used. Some examples of scientific fields that AFMA believes are not applied enough when researching and creating drugs include complexity science, developmental biology, evolutionary biology, genetics and personalized medicine.

Additional goals that the organization has are to have the requirements for animal testing reevaluated through the U.S. Food and Drug Administration and United States Environmental Protection Agency. AFMA also wants influential institutions such as the National Institutes of Health to stop encouraging animal models for research, so that other scientific organizations will steer away from animal testing.

== Trans-Species Modeling Theory ==
The Trans-Species Modeling Theory (TSMT) was written by Ray Greek MD, the president of Americans for Medical Advancement. It states, “while trans-species exploration is possible when perturbations concern lower levels of organization or when studying morphology and function on the gross level, one evolved, complex system will not be of predictive value for another when the perturbation affects higher levels of organization.”

In other words, when studying higher level organisms, the predictive value to drugs is not accurate because there are too many differences between their complexities. These differences mean that there are different responses to treatments. Higher level organisms are so complex that there is a variation in responses, even within organisms of the same species, depending on each individual organism’s initial state.

Greek wrote the Trans-Species Modeling Theory using modern science and newer information. More commonly than not, the methods that scientist use today are based on findings from scientists from centuries ago. Many of those findings are outdated and no longer valid, but continue to be the basis of regulations for procedures used in scientific labs today. Old findings suggested that there were more similarities than differences between similar mammals, so a monkey, for instance, would be tested for a certain heart condition in humans. Up to date science can now prove that although similar, a monkey's heart differs from a human heart, and therefore would not provide precise data in comparison to a human heart.
