= Understanding Animal Research =

- Founded: 2008
- Type: Membership organisation
- Purpose: Animal research
- Location: London, UK
- Region served: United Kingdom
- Key people: Wendy Jarrett, CEO; Professor Jeremy Pearson, Chair
- Website: understandinganimalresearch.org.uk

Understanding Animal Research (UAR) is a British membership organisation formed in late 2008 through the merger of the Research Defence Society and the Coalition for Medical Progress. Its main aims are to "explain why animals are used in medical and scientific research. We aim to achieve a broad understanding of the humane use of animals in medical, veterinary, scientific and environmental research in the UK".

== History ==
The Research Defence Society (RDS) was founded in 1908 "to make known the facts as to experiments on animals in this country; the immense importance to the welfare of mankind of such experiments and the great saving of human life and health directly attributable to them". Within a year, the society had over 2000 members with branches across the country organising lectures and debates. Over the next century the RDS campaigned against animal rights extremism including lobbying for a strengthened version of the Criminal Justice and Public Order Bill in 1994 and setting up a Legal Defence Fund in 1989 to pay the legal costs of scientists who were seeking libel actions.

The Coalition for Medical Progress was launched in 2003 as part of a wider alliance to communicate the benefits of animal research to the wider public. In 1999, 65% of people agreed with the statement "I have a lack of trust in the regulatory system about animal research". By 2007, this has fallen to 35%.

When the organisations merged Dr Simon Festing, executive director of the Research Defence Society, became its first chief executive. In November 2012 Wendy Jarrett, who formerly worked at NICE, took over as Chief Executive at UAR.

== Activities ==
UAR is a membership organization with over 110 organizational members as well as individual supporters. It is funded by its members who come from various sectors including academic, pharmaceutical, charities, research funders, professional and learned societies, executive agencies and trade unions. UAR seeks to explain the costs as well as the benefits of animal research and features explanations of procedures on its website. UAR takes a number of different approaches to engagement, from running a schools programme which encourages researchers to explain their work to students, to policy and media work, to engagement with institutions which undertake animal research.

UAR were involved in the development and surrounding discussions of EU Directive 63/2010, which harmonised animal welfare standards in labs throughout the EU. UAR has applauded the quality of welfare for animals used in research in the UK, saying that it is held to the highest standards in the world.

The website provides extensive information, including statistics and videos, and news on animal research in the UK and beyond. In addition to the Understanding Animal Research Website the organisation has created AnimalResearch.Info a website that provides peer-reviewed, fully referenced information on animal research and labanimaltour.org, which offers a guided tour of four laboratories with embedded videos of experiments, procedures and supporting processes such as feeding and cleaning.

In 2012, Understanding Animal Research, responding to a small dip in public support for animal research, announced the Declaration of Openness with 41 organisations, including charities, pharmaceuticals and universities, promising to take part "in an ongoing conversation about why and how animals are used in research and the benefits of this". On 14 May 2014, 72 signatories came together to sign the Concordat on Openness on Animals in Research in the UK, pledging to enhance their communications regarding the animal research they support, fund or conduct. As of 22 August 2017 the Concordat has been signed by 116 organisations.

== See also ==
- Three Rs (animal research)
- Federation of European Laboratory Animal Science Associations
