= Simon Festing =

British activist

Simon Festing is Head of Governance and Risk at the Dogs Trust.

== Education ==
Festing graduated in 1987 as a Bachelor of Medicine from the London Hospital Medical College. He worked as a medical doctor for three years before leaving medicine in 1990 to study Environmental Technology at Imperial College, graduating with an MSc in 1991.

== Career ==
Festing did voluntary work for Greenpeace from 1992 to 1994, before joining Friends of the Earth in 1994, where he was employed as their transport and wildlife campaigner until 1998. He worked as a campaign leader for Help the Aged from 1998–1999, then became Director of Public Dialogue for the Association of Medical Research Charities, an umbrella group representing 100 medical-research charities, a post he held from 2000 until 2004, when he joined the Research Defence Society (RDS). He was chief executive of Understanding Animal Research (formerly RDS) from 2004 until June 2011. After this he was Chief Executive af a number of charities and professional bodies, including the Microbiology Society, Chartered Institution for Water and Environmental Management (CIWEM), and the British Healthcare Trades Association.

== Public profile ==
In December 2005, Festing appeared on a British reality TV show, The Devil's Challenge, in which he was subjected to procedures used in animal labs, later engaging in an online debate with John Curtin, an animal-rights activist.
