= Alternatives to animal testing =

Test methods that avoid the use of animals

Alternatives to animal testing are the development and implementation of test methods that avoid the use of live animals. There is widespread agreement that a reduction in the number of animals used and the refinement of testing to reduce suffering should be important goals for the industries involved. Two major alternatives to in vivo animal testing are in vitro cell culture techniques and in silico computer simulation; however, some claim they are not true alternatives because simulations use data from prior animal experiments and cell cultures often require animal derived products, such as serum or cells. Others say that they cannot replace animals completely as they are unlikely to ever provide enough information about the complex interactions of living systems.

Other alternatives include the use of humans for skin irritancy tests and donated human blood for pyrogenicity studies. Another alternative is microdosing, in which the basic behaviour of drugs is assessed using human volunteers receiving doses well below those expected to produce whole-body effects. While microdosing produces important information about pharmacokinetics and pharmacodynamics, it does not reveal information about toxicity or toxicology. Furthermore, it was observed by the Fund for the Replacement of Animals in Medical Experiments that despite the use of microdosing, "animal studies will still be required".

Guiding principles for more ethical use of animals in testing are the Three Rs (3Rs) first described by Russell and Burch in 1959. These principles are now followed in many testing establishments worldwide.

1. Replacement refers to the preferred use of non-animal methods over animal methods whenever it is possible to achieve the same scientific aim.
2. Reduction refers to methods that enable researchers to obtain comparable levels of information from fewer animals, or to obtain more information from the same number of animals.
3. Refinement refers to methods that alleviate or minimize potential pain, suffering, or distress, and enhance animal welfare for the animals used.

== Cell culture and tissue engineering ==
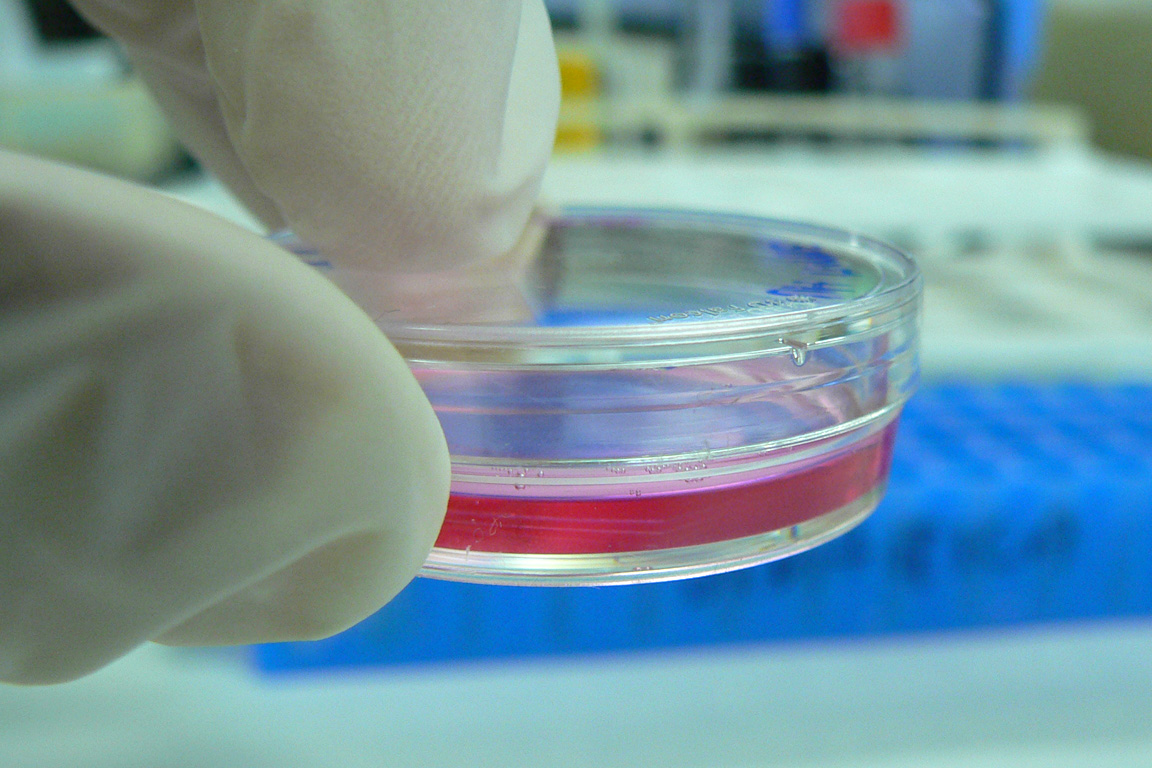
Cell culture in a special tissue culture dish

Cell culture can be an alternative to animal use in some cases. For example, cultured cells have been developed to create monoclonal antibodies; prior to this, production required animals to undergo a procedure likely to cause pain and distress. However, even though cell or tissue culture methods may reduce the number of experiments performed on intact animals, the maintenance of cells in culture normally requires the use of animal-derived serum. Although exact figures are difficult to obtain, some have estimated that one million foetal cows are sacrificed each year to obtain the world's supply of foetal bovine serum, used to grow cultured cells. The testing of cosmetic products directly onto an animal can be minimized or eliminated by the use of in vitro cell growth and development. This can be generalized as the growth of cells outside of the body and tested on without causing harm or pain on the test subject. Much of the time this method of cosmetic testing is less time-consuming and less expensive than alternative choices.

=== Skin corrosion and skin irritation ===
Skin irritation and skin corrosion refer to localized toxic effects resulting from a topical exposure of the skin to a substance. Human skin equivalent tests can be used to replace animal-based corrosive and irritative studies. EpiDerm from Mattek and EpiSkin and SkinEthic RHE model are derived from human skin cells which have been cultured to produce a model of human skin. These methods are currently accepted replacements in Canada and the European Union (EU). In August 2010, the Organisation for Economic Co-operation and Development (OECD) published the Test Guideline 439 which describes the new procedure for in vitro hazard identification of irritant chemicals.

Another synthetic replacement uses a protein membrane to simulate a skin barrier and is approved as a partial replacement by the US Department of Transportation and European Union.

=== Skin absorption ===
Several tissue culture methods that measure the rate of chemical absorption by the skin have been approved by the OECD.

=== Phototoxicity ===
Phototoxicity is a rash, swelling, or inflammation, like a severe sunburn, caused by exposure to light following exposure to a chemical. The 3T3 Neutral Red Uptake (NRU) Phototoxicity Test, approved by the OECD, detects the viability of 3T3 cells after exposure to a chemical in the presence or absence of light. The 3T3 cell line was developed in 1962 and is derived from mouse embryonic fibroblast cells.

=== Fungal model for mammalian drug metabolism ===
Fungi like Cunninghamella elegans can be used as a microbial model of mammalian drug metabolism thereby reducing the need for laboratory animals.

Prokaryotes are often used as an alternative to animal testing. Prokaryotes include bacteria such as Escherichia coli (E. coli) or Bacillus subtilis. These bacteria are the ideal model for genetic and molecular studies. Fungi is also used as an alternative for animal testing. Certain fungi can be used for genetic studies or circadian rhythms studies. This may include Neurospora crassa, otherwise known as a type of red mould. Invertebrates are another ideal candidate for testing. One of the most common invertebrates tested on include Drosophila melanogaster, the fruit fly. Fruit flies are used to find human diseases.

=== Organoids (3D cell cultures) ===
In recent years, 3D cell cultures, also known as organoids or mini-organs, have replaced animal models for some types of research. These models can be used to model disease and test new drugs. Organoids grow in vitro on scaffolds (biological or synthetic hydrogels such as Matrigel) or in a culture medium. Organoids are derived from three kinds of human or animal stem cells—embryonic pluripotent stem cells (ESCs), adult somatic stem cells (ASCs), and induced pluripotent stem cells (iPSCs). These organoids are grown in vitro and mimic the structure and function of different organs such as the brain, liver, lung, kidney, and intestine. Organoids have been developed to study infectious disease. Scientists at Johns Hopkins University have developed mini-brain organoids to model how COVID-19 can affect the brain. Researchers have used brain organoids to model how the Zika virus disrupts foetal brain development. Tumoroids—3D cell cultures derived from cells biopsied from human patients—can be used in studying the genomics and drug resistance of tumours in different organs. Organoids are also used in modelling genetic diseases such as cystic fibrosis, neurodegenerative diseases such as Alzheimer's and Parkinson's, infectious diseases such as MERS-CoV and norovirus, and parasitic infections such as Toxoplasma gondii. Human- and animal-cell-derived organoids are also used extensively in pharmacological and toxicological research.

== Human-based ==
=== Skin irritation ===
A skinpatch test has been designed and is used in Canada to measure development of rashes, inflammation, swelling or abnormal tissue growth on human volunteers. Unlike corrosives, substances defined as irritants cause only reversible skin damage.

Another approach has been the development of test methods that use cultured human cells. Human epidermal keratinocytes have been cultured to mimic the human epidermis, and are used to measure skin irritation and dermal corrosion. This method has been accepted by the EU and is intended to replace the Draize rabbit skin irritation test.

=== Pyrogenicity ===
Pyrogens are most often pharmaceutical products or intravenous drugs that may cause inflammation or fever when they interact with immune system cells. This interaction can be quickly and accurately tested in vitro.

=== Modular immune in vitro construct ===
The modular immune in vitro construct (MIMIC) uses human cells to create a model of the human immune system on which the efficacy of new vaccines and other compounds may be tested, replacing some steps of the vaccine development process that would otherwise be performed on animals. This process is faster and more flexible than previous methods but critics worry that it may be too simple to be useful on a large scale.

=== Medical imaging ===
Medical imaging is able to demonstrate to researchers both how drugs are metabolised by use of microdosing, and the detailed condition of organ tissue.

== Computer simulation ==
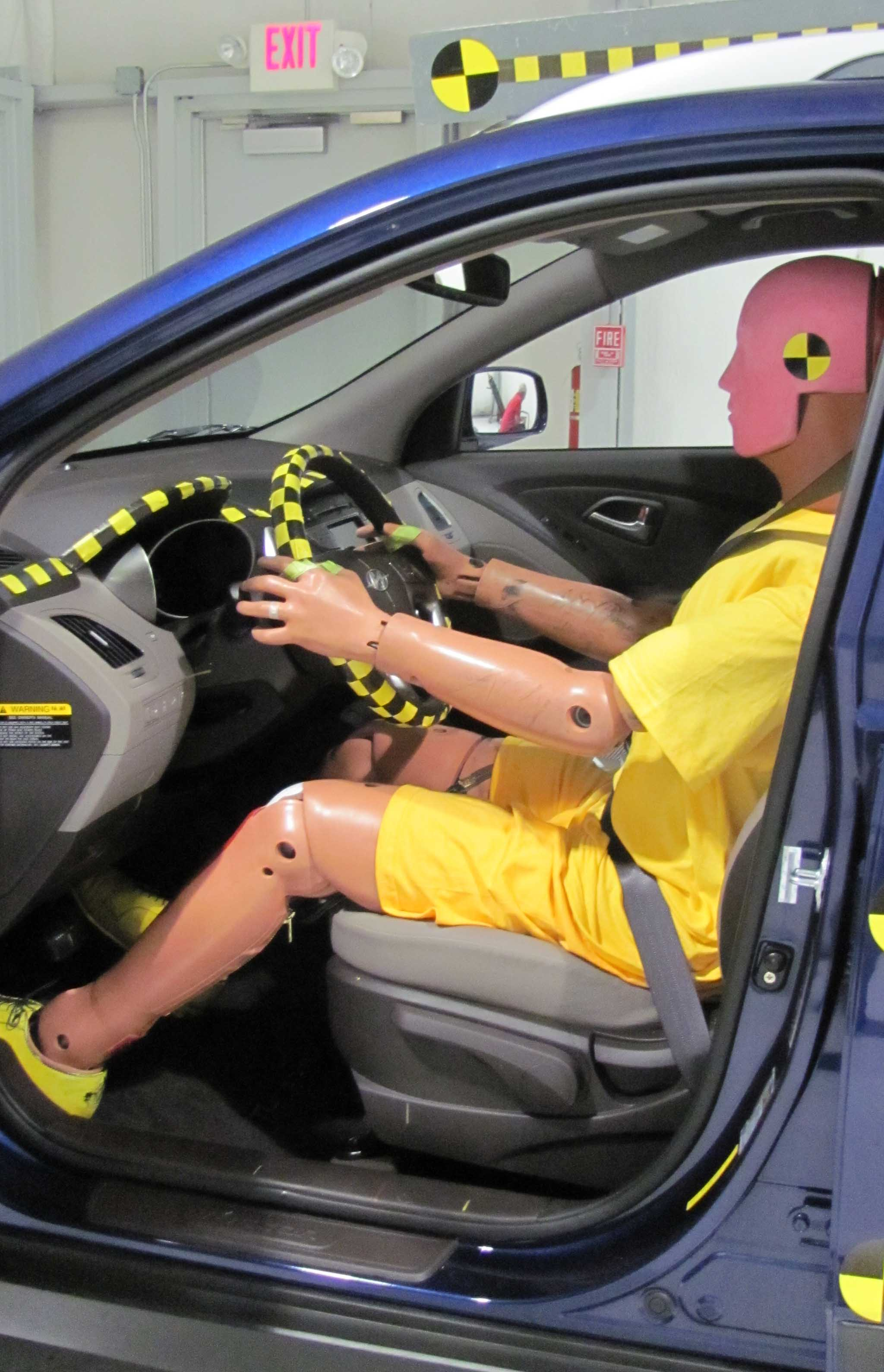
Crash test dummies have been used to replace live animals in impact testing.

Examples of computer simulations available include models of asthma, though potential new medicines identified using these techniques are currently still required to be verified in animal and human tests before licensing.

Computer operated mannequins, also known as crash test dummies, complete with internal sensors and video, have replaced live animal trauma testing for automobile crash testing. The first of these was "Sierra Sam" built in 1949 by Alderson Research Labs (ARL) Sierra Engineering. These dummies continue to be refined. Prior to this, live pigs were used as test subjects for crash testing.

Computer models have been constructed to model human metabolism, to study plaque build-up and cardiovascular risk, and to evaluate toxicity of drugs, tasks for which animals are also used. In 2007, US researchers using the world's fastest computer at the time, BlueGene L, modelled half a mouse brain for just 10 seconds. However, due to limitations in computing power, the simulation could only be run at one-tenth the speed of an actual mouse brain. Although this was an advance in science, its representative power as a model was limited and the researchers were quoted as saying that "although the simulation shared some similarities with a mouse's mental make-up in terms of nerves and connections it lacked the structures seen in real mice brains."

In pharmacology and toxicology, physiologically based pharmacokinetic models can be used for in vitro to in vivo extrapolation and to predict the time-dependent distribution of chemicals in the organism, while quantitative structure-activity relationship (QSAR) models can be used to predict the physicochemical and hazard properties of chemicals.

== Microfluidic chips ==
Microfluidic chips, which are just 2 cm (0.79 in) wide, can be engraved into a series of small chambers, each containing a sample of tissue from a different part of the body. A substitute of blood flows through micro-channels where the compartments of chips linked. When injected, the test drug circulates around the device, mimicking what goes in the body on a micro scale. Sensors in the chip transfer information for computer analysis.

Another name for microfluidic chips is cell-bio chips. With the capacity to "perform perfusion culture" and reproduce "physiological conditions such three-dimensional architectures, circulatory flowrate and zonation and multi cellular co-cultures", the biochips have set themselves apart from basic cell cultures analysed in a Petri dish. The effectiveness of these systems is constantly being increased with various new materials that can be used to make it. An ideal material would be gas permeable but still be able to absorb molecules that would be expected to be found in various drugs

The choice of the material for chips is still challenging. One of the major materials that can be possibly used in chips is known as polydimethylsiloxane (PDMS). However, due to lack of facilities for mass production and drug clearance issue, the use of PDMS is still being speculated, even though it has great properties as microfluidic chip. Also, the biological process involved in proliferation and metabolism might be modified when compared to larger scales, because the materials have micro-structured scales comparable in size to cells.

In general, the machinability and ease of handling of PDMS membranes in Organ Chips are often prioritized over their limitations. To address the poor cell adherence of PDMS membranes, coatings with natural polymers like fibronectin are commonly applied. However, a significant challenge in pharmacokinetics remains the unwanted adsorption of proteins and growth factors on these membranes. To overcome this, alternatives such as membranes made from other synthetic polymers like poly(ε-caprolactone) (PCL) have been explored. Recently, Doryab and colleagues introduced a hybrid ultrathin PCL/gelatin membrane, termed BETA (Biphasic Elastic Thin for Air-liquid culture conditions), which exhibits lung-like properties, including a Young's modulus of less than 10 kPa, a thickness of less than 1 μm, excellent biocompatibility, and angiogenic potential. This innovative membrane has been successfully employed in a "mini-lung" model.

== Future alternatives ==
=== Organs on a chip ===
Some major academics institutes such as the Wyss Institute for Biologically Inspired Engineering (US) intends to develop in-vitro organs for drug screening and thereby reduce the use of animals for this type of testing. One model is the "lung-on-a-chip". This combines microfabrication techniques with modern tissue engineering and mimics the complicated mechanical and biochemical behaviours of a human lung. Since its rise in popularity in the early 2010s, the technology has given rise to several start-ups as well as revived several old technologies for a variety of organ models. Even with increasing standardization widescale adoption remains challenging and several specific organ functionalities, such as those relating to the brain, remain hard to mimick.

=== Human toxome ===
Toxicity testing typically involves studying adverse health outcomes in animals subjected to high doses of toxicants with subsequent extrapolation to expected human responses at lower doses. The system relies on the use of a 40+year-old patchwork of animal tests that are expensive (costing more than $3B per year), time-consuming, low-throughput and often provide results of limited predictive value for human health effects. The low-throughput of current toxicity testing approaches (which are largely the same for industrial chemicals, pesticides and drugs) has led to a backlog of more than 80,000 chemicals to which humans are potentially exposed whose potential toxicity remains largely unknown. In 2007, the National Research Council (NRC) released the report "Toxicity Testing in the 21st Century: A Vision and a Strategy", that charted a long-range strategic plan for transforming toxicity testing. The major components of the plan include the use of predictive, high-throughput cell-based assays (of human origin) to evaluate perturbations in key toxicity pathways, and to conduct targeted testing against those pathways. This approach will greatly accelerate our ability to test the vast "storehouses" of chemical compounds using a rational, risk-based approach to chemical prioritization, and provide test results that are hopefully far more predictive of human toxicity than current methods. Although a number of toxicity pathways have already been identified, most are only partially known and no common annotation exists. Mapping the entirety of these pathways (i.e. the Human Toxome) will be a large-scale effort, perhaps on the order of the Human Genome Project.

== Research initiatives ==
=== SEURAT-1 ===
SEURAT-1 is a long-term strategic target for "Safety Evaluation Ultimately Replacing Animal Testing". It is called "SEURAT-1" to indicate that more steps have to be taken before the final goal will be reached. SEURAT-1 will develop knowledge and technology building blocks required for the development of solutions for the replacement of current repeated dose systemic toxicity testing in vivo used for the assessment of human safety. SEURAT-1 is composed of six research projects, which started on 1 January 2011, and will run for five years. These projects will closely cooperate with a common goal and combine the research efforts of over 70 European universities, public research institutes and companies. The collaboration between these six research projects, the dissemination of results, the cooperation with other international research teams, and the continuous updating on research priorities will be facilitated by the coordination and support action project "COACH".

SEURAT-1 was developed through the Framework Programme 7 (FP7) research initiative and was created through a call for proposals by the European Commission (EC) that was published in June 2009. The Cosmetics Europe industry offered to match the EC's funds to make a total of EUR 50 million available to try to fill current gaps in scientific knowledge and accelerate the development of non-animal test methods.

=== Euroecotox ===
Laboratory animals are not restricted to rats, mice, dogs, and rabbits, but also include fish, frogs and birds. Research into alternatives to replace these species is often neglected, although fish are the third most widely used laboratory animal used for scientific purposes in the EU. This is also the field where until now only two alternative tests exist worldwide: One guideline, OECD TG 236, and one guidance (OECD series on testing and assessment 126) are so far available.

Euroecotox is a European network for alternative testing strategies in ecotoxicology. It was funded by the Seventh Framework Programme (FP7) of the European Commission Environment Programme. The main objectives of the Euroecotox network are: To contribute to the advancement of alternative methods of ecotoxicity testing in Europe. To promote the validation and regulatory acceptance of new alternative ecotoxicity methods. To facilitate the networking of research groups working in the field of alternative ecotoxicology. To provide a gathering point for all stakeholders involved in the development, validation, regulatory acceptance and final use of alternative ecotoxicity testing strategies. To act as the one voice for alternative ecotoxicity testing in Europe.

=== AXLR8 ===
AXLR8 is a coordination action funded by the European Commission Directorate General for Research & Innovation under the 7 Framework Programme 7 (FP7) Health Theme. The European Commission is currently funding a number of research consortia to develop new 3Rs (replacement, reduction and refinement) test methods and strategies as potential alternatives to the use of animals in safety testing. Monitoring of these 3Rs activities at pan-European, national, and international levels is vital to facilitate swift progress. AXLR8 aims to fulfil this growing need by providing a focal point for dialogue and collaboration. Humane Society International is part of the consortium.

== Regulation ==
=== European Union ===
==== EU Directive 2010/63/EU ====
On 1 January 2013, EU Directive 2010/63/EU "on the protection of animals used for scientific purposes" entered into force for the EU member states (MS), repealing Directive 86/609/EEC. Because it is a directive, it allows member states certain flexibility in transposition of national rules. The status of the implementation of the new directive in the EU is described by the EC General Environment Directorate.

Article 1.3: The new EU directive applies to the following animals: (a) live non-human vertebrate animals, including: (i) independently feeding larval forms; and (ii) foetal forms of mammals from the last third of their normal development; (b) live cephalopods.

Article 4: The directive refers directly to the 3Rs: "Principle of replacement, reduction and refinement".

Article 47-2: Member states shall assist the commission in identifying and nominating suitable specialised and qualified laboratories to carry out such validation studies.

In July 2013, the commission announced the creation of NETVAL (European Union Network of Laboratories for the Validation of Alternative Methods). EU-NETVAL's primary role is to provide support for EURL ECVAM validation projects, including aspects of training and dissemination, and the identification of methods that have a potential to reduce, refine or replace animals used for scientific purposes. Currently there are thirteen test facilities in nine member states: Germany (3), the Netherlands (2), Spain (2), Belgium (1), Czech Republic (1), Finland (1), France (1), Italy (1) and Sweden (1).

==== Other regulations ====
The Cosmetics Directive provides the regulatory framework for the phasing out of animal testing for cosmetics purposes. It establishes prohibitions against (a) testing finished cosmetic products and cosmetic ingredients on animals (testing ban), and (b) marketing in the EU finished cosmetic products and ingredients included in cosmetic products which were tested on animals for cosmetics purposes (marketing ban). The same provisions are contained in Cosmetics Regulation EU 1223/2009, which replaces the Cosmetics Directive as of 11 July 2013.

In 2007, EU legislation on the Registration, Evaluation, Authorisation and Restriction of Chemicals (REACH EC 1907/2006) came into force, relating to chemicals and their safe use. The aim of REACH is to improve the protection of human health and the environment through the better and earlier identification of the intrinsic properties of chemical substances. It promotes the use of alternative methods for animal testing, but does not oblige the test performer to do so; "Article 25.1 – In order to avoid animal testing, testing on vertebrate animals for the purposes of this Regulation shall be undertaken only as a last resort. It is also necessary to take measures limiting duplication of other tests."

In parallel to the adoption of REACH, the EC published standardised and accepted methods for testing hazardous properties of chemicals. These were written into the "Test Methods Regulation". All the alternative test methods among the in vivo studies are included in PART B; "The European Union is committed to promoting the development and validation of alternative techniques which can provide the same level of information as current animal tests, but which use fewer animals, cause less suffering or avoid the use of animals completely. Such methods, as they become available, must be considered wherever possible for hazard characterisation and consequent classification and labeling for intrinsic hazards and chemical safety assessment."

EU philosophy on food additives, food enzymes, and food flavourings and ingredients intended for human consumption is that none should be put on the market unless they are included on a published Community list of authorised substances, in accordance with the conditions laid down in relevant food law. This approach is intended to bring food producers into compliance with the provisions of Regulation (EC) 1334/2008 that pertain to the safety of food flavourings. As part of the approval process, the EC will require full disclosure of study data, safety issues, and toxicological findings for all such additives.

Within the EU animal welfare law (2010/63/EU), the principles of the 3Rs are invoked whenever toxicological test methods are necessary.

== Organizations and programs ==
=== Scientific congresses ===
The European Society for Alternatives to Animal Testing (EUSAAT) organises an annual conference in Linz (Austria) for

1. Dissemination and validation of alternative methods to animal testing
2. Promotion of research in the field of the 3Rs
3. Reduction of the use of animals for tests in the field of education and continuing education
4. Reduction of suffering and stress of laboratory animals by better breeding, keeping, test planning and other accompanying measures
5. Experts' guidance and referees' opinion for public and private organizations, companies, universities
6. Suitable information for the public and the media

The European Society of Toxicology in Vitro (ESTIV) focuses on New Non-animal Approaches(NAMs) in Toxicology, including in vitro, in silico, and in chemico technologies and promotes science based on the AOPs knowledge. It organises bi-annual conferences in Europe and an annual ESTIV Applied in Toxicology Course, recognised by EUROTOX for obtaining ERT certification. It was established in 1994 and is one of the oldest professional associations in the in vitro and in-silico toxicology in the EU.

The World Congress on Alternatives and Animal Use in the Life Sciences takes place every three years. The next conference (10th) will be held in September 2017 in Seattle.

The 1st Latino-Americano Congress on Alternative to Animal Testing took place in 2012. Colama (I Congresso Latino-Americano De Metodos Alternativos Ao Uso De Animais No Ensino, Pesquisa E Industria).

The Johns Hopkins University Center for Alternatives to Animal Testing (CAAT) co-organizes an annual symposium on the 3Rs with the USDA's Animal Welfare Information Center (AWIC) and NIH's Office of Laboratory Animal Welfare. Previously known as the Social Housing Symposium, the symposium has occurred annually (except for 2015) since 2013 with past symposia archived on video on the AWIC website. Videos of the most recent symposium, "7th Annual 3Rs Symposium: Practical Solutions and Success Stories", held in June 2020, may also be found on the AWIC website.

=== Industry and corporate initiatives ===
- Cosmetics Europe: Represents the interests of more than 4000 companies in the cosmetic, toiletry and perfumery industry since 1962.
- Unilever: "We do not test finished products on animals unless demanded by the regulatory authorities in the few countries where this is the law. In such cases, we try to convince the local authorities to change the law. Where some testing of ingredients is required by law or currently unavoidable, we aim to minimise the number of animals used."
- BASF: "Systematic screening investigations provide information about important toxicological properties of substances at an early stage of development. ... We replace animal experiments whenever an alternative method is available that complies with an OECD Test Guideline and is recognized by the authorities."

=== Animal welfare and animal rights organizations ===
- Eurogroup for Animals: "An estimated 12.1 million animals – including dogs, rabbits and even our closest genetic relatives, primates – are used in laboratory research throughout Europe every year. Eurogroup focusses on ensuring their protection and works with legislators, experts and industry with the aim of ultimately replacing all animal experiments with viable alternatives. We continue to actively promote the replacement, reduction and refinement of animal tests and do all we can to improve the lives of those animals currently used for research."
- Vier Pfoten (Four Paws) (Austria)
- Antidote (France) "When it is about assessing drug safety, humans are not 70 kg rats! It is about time to move on from the actual paradigm on assessing drug safety. The first step would be to eliminate all the regulatory requirements for animal testing and replace these tests by 21st century methods."
- Deutscher Tierschutzbund (Germany)
- Lega Anti Vivisezione (Italy)
- The ALEXANDRA Association (Monaco): "... aims at stimulating research and development (R&D) in the area of alternative methods to animal experimentation by providing political, technical and educational support to researchers and entrepreneurs worldwide. In particular alternative methods based on 'Open Source' concepts i.e. non-patent protected core technologies for human tissue reconstruction and cell culture technologies will be actively promoted."
- British Union for the Abolition of Vivisection (BUAV): "For over 100 years the BUAV has been campaigning peacefully to create a world where nobody wants or believes we need to experiment on animals."
- New England Anti-Vivisection Society (NEAVS) (United States): "Recognition of the inadequacy of animal toxicity testing has resulted in the development of better techniques ... NEAVS and its programs will help hasten the inevitable and necessary transition away from animal-based experimentation, testing, and teaching, toward science and science education governed by progressive scientific thought and compassionate ethics."
- Humane Society International (HSI) in the US and UK: "Today, scientific and government authorities worldwide are acknowledging the deficiencies of "animal models" and calling for a new approach to safety testing and health research using state-of-the-art techniques. Advances in biology, genetics, computer science and robotics have given scientists new tools to help identify the root causes of human toxicity and disease."
- People for the Ethical Treatment of Animals (PETA) in the US and UK: "We teamed up with CeeTox, Inc. to fund work on a new humane skin test that could replace painful tests on mice and guinea pigs."

=== Public campaigns and awards ===
- Petition to the European Parliament for the abolition of vivisection as a European Citizen Initiative. The threshold of 1 million signatures was reached for the deadline (1 November 2013). The European Commission is currently checking the authenticity of each signature.
- "Go cruelty free" The launch of the global "Go Cruelty-Free" campaign occurred in 2012 and every year since the launch there have been more and more contributions from around the globe to help put a stop to using animals for lab testing. The most recent contribution is from Australia in 2019, they banned the use of newly derived animal test data for cosmetics.
- HSI's report "Advancing Safety Science and Health Research with Innovative, Non-Animal Tools"
- The Lush Prize: "The Lush Prize is a major initiative which will use resources to bring forward the day when safety testing takes place without the use of animals. The Lush Prize will focus pressure on toxicity testing for consumer products and ingredients in a way which complements the many projects already addressing the use of animals in medical testing."
- EPAA (European Partnership for Alternative Approaches to Animal Testing) will grant a €3000 prize to a laboratory technician involved in implementing and raising awareness of Replacement, Reduction and Refinement of animal testing.
- The Alternatives Research and Development Foundation (ARDF) provides grants to advance the use of non-animal methods in the fields of biomedical testing, research, and education.
- The international NC3Rs 3Rs Prize is awarded to highlight an outstanding original contribution to scientific and technological advances in the 3Rs in medical, biological or veterinary sciences published within the last three years.
- The American Fund for Alternatives to Animal Research (AFAAR) funds a wide and encompassing range of research involving the use, development, or validation of alternatives.

=== Education and training ===
- IIVS: The Institute for In Vitro Sciences, Inc. is a non-profit research and testing laboratory dedicated to the advancement of in vitro (non-animal) methods worldwide. Founded in 1997, IIVS has worked with industry and government agencies to implement in vitro testing strategies that limit animal use while supplying key information for product safety and efficacy decisions.
- NORINA is a database containing details of products which may be used as alternatives or supplements to the use of animals in education and training. NORINA's search engine is linked to those of two other databases: TextBase, which provides information on textbooks and other written material of relevance to laboratory animal science and alternatives, and 3R Guide which gives details of guidelines, information centres, databases, journals and email lists within the field of replacement, reduction and refinement of animal experimentation. The three databases are hosted by Norecopa.
- InterNICHE is the International Network for Humane Education. It has been developed to meet the needs of teachers and trainers, students, ethics committees, alternatives producers and campaigners internationally.
- "Tierschutz macht Schule" – the Association for Animal Welfare Education – was founded in the course of the implementation of Austria's nationwide animal welfare law. The animal welfare education association aims to improve the living conditions of pets, farm animals, laboratory animals and wild animals through providing knowledge about their needs and behaviour to children, youth and the public. The association offers a teaching magazine about research animals and animal tests suitable for secondary schools and college, which can be ordered on their website. It aims at explaining alternatives to animal testing in a youth appropriate language and can be used in lessons straight away.
- XCellR8's mission is to support, develop and implement the use of scientifically advanced and ethically sound alternatives to animal testing. They are an exclusively in vitro company, with commitment to promoting non-animal testing strategies at the core of all of their activities.
- The Animal Welfare Information Center at the National Agricultural Library (USDA) holds a workshop several times a year called "Meeting the Information Requirements of the Animal Welfare Act". In the workshop, researchers and other stakeholders learn how to perform literature searches for animal use alternatives as well as the history and evolution of the Animal Welfare Act of 1966 and its amendments, showing how the legislation regulates animal welfare.
- EPISKIN Academy is an initiative of the industry to propose training and courses to facilitate the deployment of validated alternative methods to animal testing in toxicology and to prepare next generations of scientists and toxicologists to use these methods. Created in 2012, EPISKIN Academy proposes a modular program ranging from demonstration of these methods to full theoretical and practical laboratory training leading to certification. Based on long-term partnerships with institutional partners in different countries, this program in education allows hands-on training to the methods but also to the scientific and regulatory knowledge important for their implementation and acceptance.
- The ESTIV Applied Training Course is a specialized educational programme organized by the European Society of Toxicology In Vitro (ESTIV) since 2015. The course provides advanced training in applied in vitro toxicology and New Approach Methodologies (NAMs), combining expert lectures, hands-on laboratory sessions, and case studies focused on chemical safety assessment and alternatives to animal testing. Intended primarily for early-career scientists, researchers, and regulatory professionals, the programme is recognized by EUROTOX as eligible for European Registered Toxicologist (ERT) accreditation.

=== Institutes and national or international organizations ===
Institutes and organizations that research or fund alternatives to animal testing include:

==== Asia – Oceania ====
- Medical Advances Without Animals Trust (Australia)
- Alternatives to Animal Experimentation Laboratory, Department of Pharmacology, Jawaharlal Nehru Medical College, Aligarh Muslim University, Aligarh (India).
- Mahatma Gandhi-Doerenkamp Center for Alternatives to Use of Animals in Life Science, Bharathidasan university, Trichy, Tamil Nadu, India Education
- Japanese Center for the Validation of Alternative Methods (JACVAM), since 2005
- The Korean Center for the Validation of Alternative Methods (KOCVAM), since 2009

==== South America ====
- BraCVAM as the Brazilian Center for the Validation of Alternatives Methods. It was established in 2011.

==== North America ====
- Canadian Council on Animal Care
- Canadian Centre for Alternatives to Animal Methods, founded in 2017 at the University of Windsor.
- Health Canada, which does not have a formal validation centre, but coordinates health related test method validation and acceptance issues
- American Fund for Alternatives to Animal Research (AFAAR): "Over the years, AFAAR has funded alternatives worldwide, including more than 200 human tissue culture tests to replace toxicity and other testing on animals ... Today, AFAAR funds a wide and encompassing range of research involving the use, development, or validation of alternatives."
- Interagency Coordinating Committee on the Validation of Alternative Methods (ICCVAM) (United States), since 1994;
- Johns Hopkins University Center for Alternatives to Animal Testing
- Physicians Committee for Responsible Medicine (United States)

==== Europe ====
- The European Commission's role in promoting the development, validation and uptake of alternative approaches to animal testing started in 1991, with the launch of ECVAM (European Centre for the Validation of Alternative Methods), hosted by the Joint Research Centre. As from 2011, ECVAM became known as the EU Reference Laboratory for Alternatives to Animal Testing (EURL ECVAM). EURL ECVAM hosts an online database of toxicological, non-animal alternative test methods DB-ALM.
- Under the Framework Programmes 6 and 7, the EC funded a significant number of large integrated research projects aiming to develop alternatives to animal testing for about EUR 330 million based on the Review of REACH from February 2013 (the European Chemical Program).
- The European Partnership for Alternative Approaches to Animal Testing (EPAA) as a liaison between the EC and industries.
- The European Consensus Platform for Alternatives (ECOPA) coordinates efforts amongst EU member states.
- Zentrum fuer Ersatz (Austria)
- Finnish Center for Alternative Methods (FICAM), since 2008
- FRANCOPA is the French platform dedicated to development, validation, and dissemination of alternative methods in animal testing. It was created on 16 November 2007.
- The Italian Centro 3R was created in 2017. It is an interuniversity center dedicated to the promotion of the 3Rs in teaching and research.
- Zentralstelle zur Erfassung und Bewertung von Ersatz- und Ergänzungsmethoden (ZEBET) (Germany), since 1989
- Norecopa is the Norwegian consensus platform for the replacement, reduction and refinement of animal experiments. It was founded on 10 October 2007.
- Romanian Center for Alternative Test Methods (ROCAM) promotes the application of alternative methods in industry and their acceptance by regulators in Romania and also the development of new methods and approaches. ROCAM was established in June 2015 with the main goal to support and promote the 3Rs principles in Romania and regionally.
- Dr Hadwen Trust (United Kingdom)
- Fund for the Replacement of Animals in Medical Experiments (United Kingdom)
- National Centre for the Replacement, Refinement and Reduction of Animals in Research (NC3Rs) (United Kingdom), since 2004

==== International ====
- International Cooperation on Alternative Test Methods (ICATM): On 27 April 2009, the United States, Canada, Japan and EU signed a memorandum of cooperation that could reduce the number of animals required for consumer product safety testing worldwide. The agreement will yield globally coordinated scientific recommendations on alternative toxicity testing methods that should speed their adoption in each of these countries, thus reducing the number of animals needed for product safety testing.

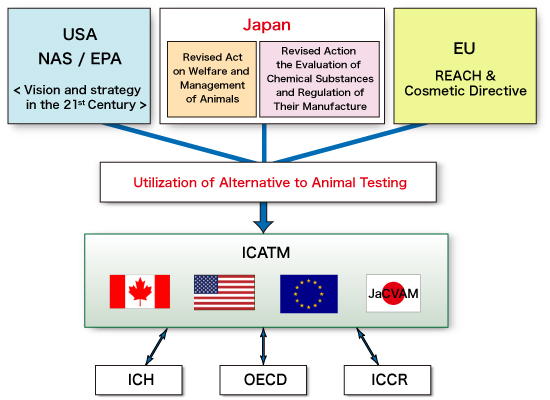
International Cooperation on Alternative Test Methods (ICATM) Legend : ICH: The International Conference on Harmonisation of Technical Requirements for Registration of Pharmaceuticals for Human Use OECD: The Organisation for Economic Co-operation and Development has a Test Guideline program that deals with chemicals. ICCR: The International Cooperation on Cosmetics Regulation (ICCR) is an international group of cosmetic regulatory authorities from the United States (FDA), Japan (Ministry of Health, Labour, and Welfare), the EU (EC, DG Enterprise), and Canada (Health Canada). This multilateral framework maintains the highest level of global consumer protection, while minimizing barriers to international trade.

- The OECD (Organisation for Economic Co-operation and Development) is a forum for discussion where governments express their points of view, share their experiences, and search for common ground, as opposed to a supranational organization. OECD is a forum where alternative test methods also undergo validation and are therereafter accepted for regulatory purposes in more than 35 member countries worldwide. NGOs are represented at the technical level at the OECD, under the ICOPA International Council on Animal Protection in OECD program. The testing of chemicals is labor-intensive and expensive. Often the same chemical is tested in several countries simultaneously, which means that redundant animal tests are performed. To relieve some of this burden, the OECD Council adopted a decision in 1981, stating that data generated in a member country, in accordance with OECD Test Guidelines and Principles of Good Laboratory Practice (GLP), shall be accepted in other member countries for assessment purposes and other uses relating to the protection of human health and the environment. This principle is referred to using the acronym MAD, for the Mutual Acceptance of Data.

== See also ==
- Animal products in pharmaceuticals
- Canadian Centre for Alternatives to Animal Methods
- Humane Research Trust
- In vitro toxicology
