= Animal testing regulations =

Guidelines with regard to animal testing

Animal testing regulations are guidelines that permit and control the use of non-human animals for scientific experimentation. They vary greatly around the world, but most governments aim to control the number of times individual animals may be used; the overall numbers used; and the degree of pain that may be inflicted without anesthetic.

== Europe ==
Experiments on vertebrate animals in the European Union are since January 1, 2013 subject to Directive 2010/63/EU on the protection of animals used for scientific purposes, which was finalized in November 2010 and updated and replaced the Directive 86/609/EEC on the protection of Animals used for Experimental and other scientific purposes, adopted in 1986. Directive 86/609/EEC showed considerable variation in the manner member countries chose to exercise the directive: compare, for example, legislation from Sweden, The Netherlands, and Germany.

With a 2004 amendment to the Cosmetics Directive, the animal testing for cosmetic products is forbidden in the EU. Also animal testing for cosmetic ingredients is prohibited since March 2009. The amendment also prohibited, since 11 March 2009, to market cosmetic products containing ingredients which have been tested on animals. The amendment does not prohibit companies to use animal testing to fulfill regulatory requirements in other countries.

=== France ===
In France, legislation (principally the decree of October 19, 1980) requires an institutional and project license before testing on vertebrates is carried out. An institution must submit details of their facilities and the reason for the experiments, after which a five-year license may be granted following an inspection of the premises. The project licensee must be trained and educated to an appropriate level. Personal licenses are not required for individuals working under the supervision of a project license holder. These regulations do not apply to research using invertebrates.

=== United Kingdom ===
The types of institutions conducting animal research in the UK in 2015 were: universities (47.7%); commercial organizations (25.1%); government departments and other public bodies (13.8%); non-profit organizations (12.4%); National Health Service hospitals (0.7%); public health laboratories (0.2%).

The Animals (Scientific Procedures) Act 1986 requires experiments to be regulated by three licences: a project licence for the scientist in charge of the project, which details the numbers and types of animals to be used, the experiments to be performed and their purpose; a certificate for the institution to ensure it has adequate facilities and staff; and a personal licence for each scientist or technician who carries out any procedure. In deciding whether to grant a licence, the Home Office refers to the Act's cost-benefit analysis, which is defined as "the likely adverse effects on the animals concerned against the benefit likely to accrue as a result of the programme to be specified in the licence" (Section 5(4)). A licence should not be granted if there is a "reasonably practicable method not entailing the use of protected animals" (Section 5(5) (a)). The experiments must use "the minimum number of animals, involve animals with the lowest degree of neurophysiological sensitivity, cause the least pain, suffering, distress, or lasting harm, and [be the] most likely to produce satisfactory results" (Section 5(5) (b)).

During a 2002 House of Lords select committee inquiry into animal testing in the UK, witnesses stated that the UK has the tightest regulatory system in the world, and is the only country to require a cost-benefit assessment of every licence application. There are 29 qualified inspectors covering 230 establishments, which are visited on average 11–12 times a year in both announced and unannounced inspections.

As a result of the transposition of Directive 2010/63/EU, changes were made to the way research is reviewed and approved in the UK. All licensed establishments must have an Animal Welfare and Ethical Review Body (commonly referred to as AWERBs) which considers and monitors project applications for the site. The assessment of severity has also changed under the amendments to the Animals (Scientific Procedures) Act (1986). Working examples of severity bands are provided by European Commission Expert Working Group. The assessment of severity must also be conducted retrospectively, which results in severity being assigned on the basis of the actual suffering experienced by the animals, rather than what is presumed during study design. This in turn leads to more accurate prospective assignment of severity bands.

=== Germany ===
The German Animal Welfare Act, 1972, is designed to enforce the utilitarian principle that there must be good reason for one to cause an animal harm and identifies that it is the responsibility of human beings to protect the lives and well-being of their fellow creatures. The Animal Welfare Act is supplemented by the Animal Protection Laboratory Animal Regulations, 2013, and the European Directive 2010/63/EU. All animal research facilities must be inspected at least every three years, with facilities conducting primate research being inspected at least once per year.

== Japan ==
Animal Experimentation in Japan is regulated by several documents - the Law for the Humane Treatment and Management of Animals, 2005, The Standards Relating to the Care and Management, and Alleviation of Pain and Distress of Experimental Animals, 2006, and guidelines by various ministries and organizations.

The law states that causing distress to animals is not allowed without due cause (Article 2), and that when conducting animal experiments, methods that reduce the pain and distress of the animals as much as possible shall be used. It also states that consideration shall be given as to the appropriate use of animals, for example by reducing the number of animals used when possible (Article 41).

The Standards state that usage of animals for scientific purpose is necessary. They include regulations for the refinement of experiments, in order to reduce the pain and distress of the experimental animals, and consideration for replacing animal experiments with alternatives or reducing the number of animals used.

MEXT (The Ministry of Education, Culture, Sports, Science and Technology) and MHLW (The Ministry of Health, Labor and Welfare) established the guidelines named "Basic policies on animal experimentation" as quasi-regulations on June 1, 2006. The SCJ (Science Council of Japan) formulated more detailed guidelines, also in 2006, to be used when institutions formate their local regulations.

The SCJ's guidelines state that the director of each research institution bears the responsibility for animal experiments conducted at their facilities, that animal experiments are indispensable, and that each institution should formulate voluntary in-house regulations for proper scientific conduct of animal experiments based on the guidelines. As well, they state that each institution should form an in-house review committee in order to inspect the experiments at that institution, from the standpoint of scientific rationale, with consideration to the Law and Standards mentioned above.

However, ALIVE Foundation conducted a survey of Japanese universities and research facilities in 2011, and concluded that:

"There appears to be little consciousness about the use of animals in experiments. Although there is an official guideline that should be followed, national universities are not complying with the guideline (in particular, in choosing particular kinds of animal, self-assessment and care/management of animals)."

== United States ==
In the United States, animal testing on vertebrates is primarily regulated by the Animal Welfare Act of 1966 (AWA), and the Animal Welfare Regulations which is enforced by the Animal Care division of the Animal and Plant Health Inspection Service (APHIS) of the United States Department of Agriculture (USDA). The AWA contains provisions to ensure that individuals of covered species used in research receive a certain standard of care and treatment, provided that the standard of care and treatment does not interfere with "the design, outlines, or guidelines of actual research or experimentation." Currently, AWA only protects mammals. In 2002, the Farm Security Act of 2002, the fifth amendment to the AWA, specifically excluded purpose-bred birds, rats, and mice (as opposed to wild-captured mice, rats, and birds) from regulations. Even though most animals used in research are mice, rats, and fish, over a million other research animals per year are covered by the Animal Welfare Act and Animal Welfare Regulations. The AWA requires each institution using covered species to maintain an Institutional Animal Care and Use Committee (IACUC), which is responsible for local compliance with the Act. In addition, the IACUC reviews and approves each animal use protocol, which is a written description the researchers submit describing all procedures to be done with laboratory animals. Researchers must consult with a veterinarian for each procedure that may cause more than momentary pain or distress to the animals. In addition a written justification for these procedures, as well as documentation of a search for alternatives to these procedures, must be included with the protocol. The IACUC must review and approve these protocols at least annually. The IACUC also inspects all the animal facilities, including satellite facilities, every 6 months. As a part of this semi-annual inspection the committee also reviews the entire animal care and use program, and submits a "semi-annual report" to the Institutional Official. The Guide (enforced by OLAW) also has requirements for IACUC responsibilities and program reviews.

Animal care and use in research in the United States are largely controlled by Institutional Animal Care and Use Committees.

The following information is based on IACUC activity in the United States over 15 years ago. In addition, the purpose of an IACUC is not to provide "consistent" oversight across studies or institutions. Each institution has its own culture, priorities, and interpretations. A study conducted in 2001 by Psychology Professor Scott Plous of Wesleyan University that evaluated the reliability of IACUCs found little consistency between decisions made by IACUCs at different institutions. A Wesleyan University press release summarized part of the findings:

The investigation, which took three years to complete, compared judgments made by 50 randomly selected animal care and use committees drawn from U.S. colleges and universities. To assess the consistency of approval decisions, 150 recent research proposals from these institutions were each independently evaluated by two different animal care and use committees.

The results showed that approval decisions were statistically unrelated. In most cases, proposals that were disapproved by one committee were approved by the second committee.

The study also explored whether reviews were more reliable when the experiment involved certain types of animals or procedures. For example, reliability was assessed for proposals that involved dogs, cats, and primates, or for experiments involving drugs, surgery, animal pain, or death. Even in these cases, independent reviews did not agree beyond chance levels.

In response to the Plous study, a rebuttal letter to Science written by animal researchers, animal care staff, and members of professional research societies stated:

That the masked protocols would be rated more negatively was predictable for the following reasons. First, IACUCs rely on knowing the experience of the investigators and staff, information that was not included for the unofficial IACUCs. Not surprisingly, most of the negative shifts (84 of 118) were to categories calling for more information. Second, withholding approval had no practical consequence. Third, participants might have felt scrutinized by researchers with an "animal rights" agenda, and erred on the side of deferral or rejection. Fourth, navigating another institution's forms can be difficult. And fifth, IACUCs unfamiliar with particular species or procedures are less likely to understand a protocol. These factors make it almost impossible to compare the actions of the original and unofficial IACUCs and thus call into question the major premises and conclusions of this study.

Institutions are also subject to unannounced annual inspections from USDA APHIS Veterinarian inspectors. There are about 70 inspectors monitoring around 1100 research institutions. The inspectors also conduct pre-licensing checks for sites that do not engage in animal research or transportation, of which more than 4000 exist (e.g. dog kennels).

Another regulatory instrument is the Office of Laboratory Animal Welfare (OLAW), which is an office within the US National Institutes of Health. OLAW oversees all animal studies funded by the Public Health Service (including NIH). The Health Research Extension Act of 1985 directed the NIH to write the Public Health Service (PHS) Policy on Humane Care and Use of Laboratory Animals. This Policy applies to any individual scientist or institution in receipt of federal funds and requires each institution to have an IACUC, among other stipulations. OLAW enforces the recommendations in the Guide for the Care and Use of Laboratory AnimalsGuide for the Care and Use of Laboratory Animals: Eighth Edition published by the Institute for Laboratory Animal Research,Page Not Found : Division on Earth and Life Studies which covers all vertebrate species, including rodents, birds, fish, amphibians, and reptiles Guide for the Care and Use of Laboratory Animals: Eighth Edition This means that IACUCs oversee the use of all vertebrate species in research at facilities receiving federal funds, even if the species are not covered by the AWA. OLAW does not carry out scheduled inspections, but requires that "As a condition of receipt of PHS support for research involving laboratory animals, awardee institutions must provide a written Animal Welfare Assurance of Compliance (Assurance) to OLAW describing the means they will employ to comply with the PHS Policy." OLAW conducts inspections only when there is a suspected or alleged violation that cannot be resolved through written correspondence. Accreditation from the Association for Assessment and Accreditation of Laboratory Animal Care International (AAALAC), a non-governmental, nonprofit association, is regarded by the industry as the "gold standard" of accreditation. Accreditation is maintained through a prearranged AAALAC site visit and program evaluation hosted by the member institution once every three years. Accreditation is intended to ensure compliance with the standards in the Guide for the Care and Use of Laboratory Animals, as well as any other national or local laws on animal welfare.

== Canada ==
The Canadian Council on Animal Care (CCAC) is set up to act in the interests of the people of Canada to ensure through programs of education, assessment and guidelines development that the use of animals, where necessary, for research, teaching and testing employs optimal physical and psychological care according to acceptable scientific standards, and to promote an increased level of knowledge, awareness and sensitivity to relevant ethical principles. At the inaugural meeting on January 30, 1968, the CCAC adopted the following statement of objective: "to develop guiding principles for the care of experimental animals in Canada, and to work for their effective application".

The federal government does not have jurisdiction to pass laws that involve experiments on animals. The provinces have jurisdiction concerning that area. The federal government, however, is involved in three areas: the criminal law power, the health power, and the spending power.

The Criminal Code of Canada

Section 446 and 447 of the Criminal Code protect animals from cruelty, abuse and neglect. This section of the Criminal Code has been under review for several years.

The Health of Animals Act

The Health of Animals Act (1990) and its regulations are aimed primarily at protecting Canadian livestock from a variety of infectious diseases that would threaten both the health of the animals and people, and Canadian trade in livestock with other countries. This act is used both to deal with named disease outbreaks in Canada, and to prevent the entry of unacceptable diseases that do not exist in Canada.

The Spending Power

The other mechanism through which the federal government has lent its support to the humane treatment of animals is not strictly speaking legislative in nature, but in many respects it is one of the most powerful instruments available to the federal government for setting national standards. The federal government's power to provide for grants subject to conditions imposed on the recipients, be they provincial governments or individual or corporate recipients, may take a variety of different forms. One form is that of the conditional federal grant or contract. This manifestation of the federal power is what currently underpins the imposition of CCAC standards on facilities receiving funding from the Canadian Institutes of Health Research and the Natural Sciences and Engineering Research Council. Where the government itself awards a contract on an academic or non-academic institution, clause A9015C of Public Works Standard Acquisition Clauses and Conditions Manual imposes conditions related to the care and use of experimental animals in public works and government services.

All of the provinces in Canada have created and passed laws that pertain to animal welfare, but only certain provinces have made their own laws. These provinces are Alberta, Manitoba, Saskatchewan, Ontario, New Brunswick, Nova Scotia, and Prince Edward Island.

=== Alberta ===
In 2006, the Alberta Animal Protection Act was revised and declared. Previously in Alberta, only academic institutions were subject to provincial regulations referencing CCAC standards, as these standards were referenced exclusively in the Alberta Universities Act. In 2005, the Universities Act and two other laws were examined by the Alberta Agriculture, Food and Rural Development Ministry (AAFRD), in hopes of combining them and update their content. Article 2(1) of the Animal Protection Regulations was revised by the CCAC and AAFRD and now states that "a person who owns or has custody, care or control of an animal for research activities must comply with the following Canadian Council on Animal Care documents", and lists all 22 CCAC standards, including the CCAC Guide to the Care and Use of Experimental Animals and the various guidelines and policies published by the CCAC.

=== Prince Edward Island ===
In Prince Edward Island, the Animal Protection Regulations made under the Animal Health and Protection Act state that the rules controlling the care of animals used for medical or scientific research can be found in Volumes 1 and 2 of the Guide to the Care and Use of Experimental Animals published by the CCAC. in the Prince Edward Islands

=== Manitoba ===
In the province of Manitoba, according to the Animal Care Act, it is not allowed for a person to cause suffering to an animal. The use of animals for research and teaching is acceptable as long as it follows the rules set out in the Act. All institutions that use animals for research and teaching purposes have to submit to obey the system put in place by the CCAC. Failing to do so, any harm done to an animal in a research or teaching program will be regarded as an offense under the Act.

=== Ontario ===
All of the research facilities in Ontario must be registered and licensed based on the legislation Animals for Research Act. Among the provisions of the Animals for Research Act, one should note the duty to establish an animal care committee, the responsibilities and powers of which are similar to those required under the CCAC system, and the requirement for any operator of a research facility to submit to the person designated by the Minister of Agriculture, Food and Rural Affairs a report respecting the animals used in the research facility for research. Regulation 24 governs the housing and care of the animals. Regulation 25 controls the conditions for transportation of the animals that are used or going to be used by a research facility.

== Australia ==
In Australia, Animal Ethics Committees (AECs) determine whether the use of an animal is valid or not. AECs must follow the Code in order to ensure the wellbeing of the animals used for research. The Code emphasizes the responsibilities of investigators, teachers and institutions using animals to:

- ensure that the use of animals is justified, taking into consideration the scientific or educational benefits and the potential effects on the welfare of the animals;
- ensure that the welfare of animals is always considered;
- promote the development and use of techniques that replace the use of animals in

scientific and teaching activities;

- minimise the number of animals used in projects; and
- refine methods and procedures to avoid pain or distress in animals used in scientific and teaching activities.

Scientific and teaching activities using animals may be performed only when they are essential:

- to obtain and establish significant information relevant to the understanding of humans and/or animals;
- for the maintenance and improvement of human and/or animal health and welfare;
- for the improvement of animal management or production;
- to obtain and establish significant information relevant to the understanding, maintenance or improvement of the natural environment; or
- for the achievement of educational objectives.

Researchers can only conduct their studies once it has approved the validity of the use of the animals and that there is more educational or scientific gain that outweighs the possible effects on the welfare of the animals. The researchers must submit a written proposal to an AEC stating what is to be accomplished, a defense for the study, and the ethical and wellbeing of the animals used reflecting the 3Rs.

== New Zealand ==
New Zealand's Animal Welfare Act 1999 requires owners and people in charge of animals to ensure the physical, health and behavioural needs of animals are met, and that pain and distress are alleviated. In New Zealand, as in many countries, laboratory animals (mainly rodents) and farm animals (mainly cattle and sheep) are used in research, testing and teaching – commonly referred to as RTT. Animal use in RTT is strictly controlled under the Animal Welfare Act 1999 and organisations using animals must follow an approved code of ethical conduct. This sets out the policies and procedures that need to be adopted and followed by the organisation and its animal ethics committee.

Every project must be approved and monitored by an animal ethics committee. These committees must have three external members:

- a nominee of an approved animal welfare organisation (such as the SPCA),
- a nominee of the New Zealand Veterinary Association and,
- a lay person to represent the public interest (and nominated by a local government body).

Code holders and their animal ethics committees are independently reviewed (by MPI accredited reviewers) at least once every five years. All code holders have to submit annual animal use statistics on the number of animals used in research, testing or teaching, and its impact on them, from little or none to severe.

The Ministry for Primary Industries (MPI) administers the Act and leads animal welfare policy and practice in New Zealand. The National Animal Ethics Advisory Committee (NAEAC) was established under the Animal Welfare Act to provide independent advice to the Minister for Primary Industries about:

- ethical and animal welfare issues relating to the use of animals in research, testing and teaching
- recommendations on the restrictions of use of non-human hominids
- advice to Animal Ethics Committees
- the development and review of codes of ethical conduct

== Brazil ==
The federal law for the scientific use of animals was passed in 2008. The law established the National Council for the Control of Animal Experimentation (CONCEA) and demanded that institutions create an ethics committee on the use of animals.

In 2009, Decree 6899/2009 defined CONCEA as the governing and advisory body, under the Ministry of Science and Technology, to authorize accreditation to registered institutions and to license those institutions to use animals in research. The same decree also states that an electronic database be developed to allow breeding and research facilities to register in order to apply for CONCEA accreditation.

Brazil also reinforces the 3Rs.

== See also ==
- Animal rights
- Cruelty to animals
- Federation of European Laboratory Animal Science Associations
