= Animal Free Research UK =

British medical research charity

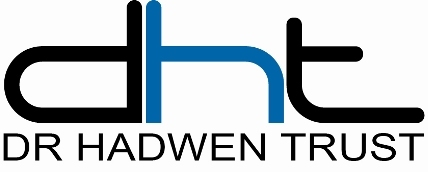

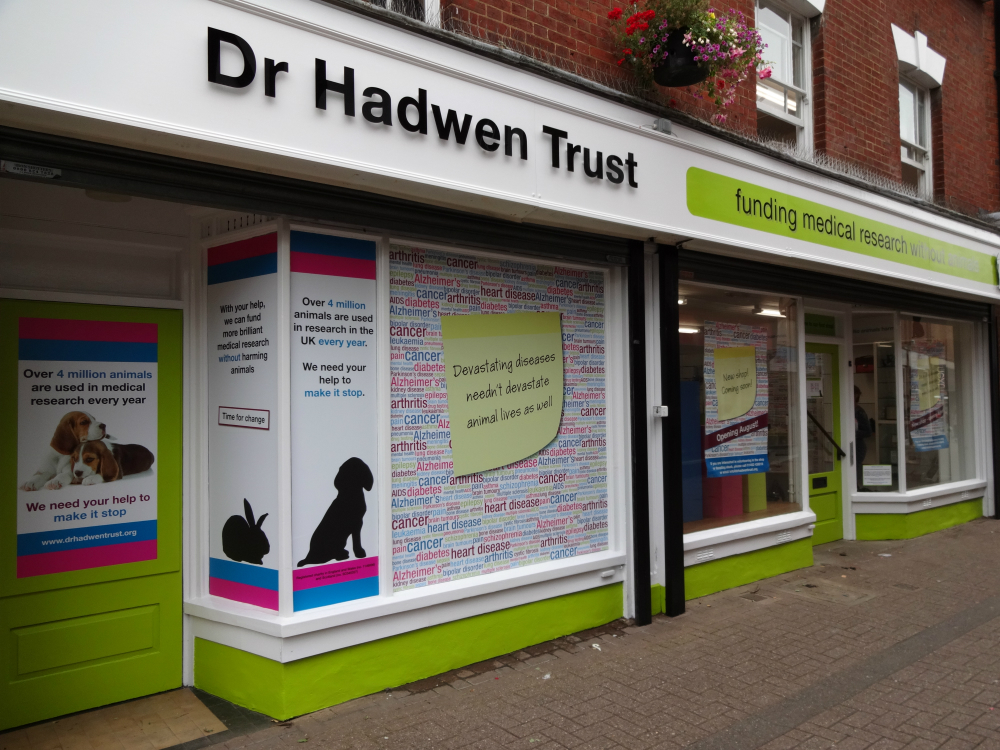
- Founded: 1970; 56 years ago
- Founder: Sidney Hicks
- Purpose: Alternatives to animal testing
- Location: King's Cross, London
- Method: Education, research, funding
- Key people: Carla Owen, CEO; Dr Karen Pilkington; Mike Philpott; Laura-Jane Sheridan, Chair of Trustees; neuro-oncologist Dr. Geoff Pilkington
- Website: www.animalfreeresearchuk.org

Animal Free Research UK (AFRUK), formerly the Dr Hadwen Trust, is a UK medical research charity that funds and promotes non-animal techniques to replace animal experiments. Established in 1970, the work undertaken by Animal Free Research UK develops reliable science whilst avoiding animal testing.

== History ==
Animal Free Research UK was established as the Dr Hadwen Trust for Humane Research in 1970 (registered charity number 261096). It was formed by the British Union for the Abolition of Vivisection (BUAV) in honour of its former president, Walter Hadwen. In 1980, Dr Hadwen Trust split from BUAV and became an independent charity.

The charity became incorporated as a charitable company (registered charity number 1146896) in 2013. In 2015, the Dr Hadwen Trust became registered as a charity in Scotland (SC045327). In April 2017, the charity changed its working name from Dr Hadwen Trust to become Animal Free Research UK.

Animal Free Research UK promotes the practice of non-animal research through its funding, publications, science community outreach, and the media. Its purpose is to "support scientists to transition from using animals to using new approach methodologies in medical research".

== Research ==
Projects receiving funding from Animal Free Research UK range from epilepsy, multiple sclerosis, breast and skin cancer, meningitis, asthma, diabetes and drug testing, to arthritis, Parkinson's disease, lung injury, whooping cough, vaccine testing, dentistry, heart disease, tropical illness, fetal development, brain tumours, and AIDS.

Funding is received in the form of summer studentships, PhD students, post-docs, and strategic grants.

== Herbie's Law ==
Animal Free Research UK launched their campaign for Herbie's Law - The Human Specific Technologies Act - in 2024.

Herbie's Law is a proposed legislative framework in the United Kingdom that aims to phase out the use of animals in medical research and replace them with human-specific research methods by 2035. Named after Herbie, a beagle bred for laboratory use who was later rehomed, the proposal was developed by Animal Free Research UK. It seeks to establish a structured transition away from animal experiments while supporting the development, validation and adoption of alternative technologies, such as organ-on-a-chip systems and advanced computer modelling.

== See also ==
- List of animal rights groups
- The Three Rs
- Cellular model
- Computational biology
- Computational biomodeling
- Computer experiment
- Folding@home
- In silico
- In vitro
- Animal in vitro cellular and developmental biology
- Plant in vitro cellular and developmental biology
- In vitro toxicology
- In vitro to in vivo extrapolation
- Nonclinical studies
- Virtual screening
- Animals (Scientific Procedures) Act (1986)
- Directive 2010/63/EU
- Walter Hadwen
