= Center for Alternatives to Animal Testing =

American research center

- Johns Hopkins University Center for Alternatives to Animal Testing
- Formation: 1981; 45 years ago
- Location: Baltimore, Maryland
- Website: caat.jhsph.edu

The Johns Hopkins University Center for Alternatives to Animal Testing (CAAT) has worked with scientists, since 1981, to find new methods to replace the use of laboratory animals in experiments, reduce the number of animals tested, and refine necessary tests to eliminate pain and distress (the Three Rs as described in Russell and Burch's Principles of Humane Experimental Technique). CAAT is an academic, science-based center affiliated with the Johns Hopkins Bloomberg School of Public Health.

CAAT promotes humane science by supporting the creation, development, validation, and use of alternatives to animals in research, product safety testing, and education. It is not an activist group; rather, it seeks to effect change by working with scientists in industry, government, and academia to find new ways to replace animals with non-animal methods, reduce the numbers of animals necessary, or refine methods to make them less painful or stressful to the animals involved. CAAT has offered grants since 1993 that fund development of non-animal in-vitro test methods that may replace the use of laboratory animals in certain tests.

Starting in 2013, CAAT has co-sponsored an annual symposium with the Animal Welfare Information Center (National Agricultural Library, USDA) and the Office of Laboratory Animal Welfare (NIH) on the Three Rs. The first six symposia focused on the social housing of laboratory animals, since it has been shown that housing social species with other animals of their kind improves animal welfare. The most recent symposium, "7th Annual 3Rs Symposium: Practical Solutions and Success Stories," occurred virtually on June 4-5, 2020 and addressed topics throughout the spectrum of the Three Rs, including using brain organoids to study infectious diseases such as COVID-19 or Zika, using Grimace Scales to access animal pain, positive reinforcement training of lab animals, and using guidelines such as ARRIVE and PREPARE to design experiments that use fewer animals.

CAAT holds an annual Summer School at Johns Hopkins School of Public Health in Baltimore, Maryland, for members of the laboratory animal community to share innovations and techniques in the 3Rs.

== See also ==
- Alternatives to animal testing
- Canadian Centre for Alternatives to Animal Methods
- List of animal rights groups
- Dr Hadwen Trust
- Henry Spira
