= DB-ALM =

DB-ALM stands for Database Service on Alternative Methods to animal experimentation, a service run under the auspices of European Commission's Directorate General Joint Research Centre. Categories at present include: in vitro toxicology methods, test results, a bibliographic section and contact details of persons and institutions active in the field of alternatives to animal testing.
