= Henry Spira =

20th century animal rights advocate

- Henry Spira in the 1970s with the cat, Savage, who triggered his interest in animal advocacy
- Born: 19 June 1927; Antwerp, Belgium
- Died: 12 September 1998 (aged 71); New York City, U.S.
- Education: Stuyvesant High School; Brooklyn College (English literature)
- Occupations: Activist, teacher
- Organization: Animal Rights International

Henry Spira (19 June 1927 – 12 September 1998) was an American activist for socialism and animal rights, who is regarded by some as one of the most effective animal advocates of the 20th century.

Working with Animal Rights International, a group he founded in 1974, Spira is particularly remembered for his successful campaign in 1976 against animal testing at the American Museum of Natural History, where cats were being experimented on for sex research, and for his full-page advertisement in 1980 in The New York Times that featured a rabbit with sticking plaster over the eyes, and the caption, "How many rabbits does Revlon blind for beauty's sake?"

== Life and work ==
=== Early life ===
Spira was born in Antwerp, Belgium, to Maurice Spira and Margit Spitzer Spira. Maurice and his father had worked in the diamond trade; his mother's father, in Hungary, had risen to become chief rabbi of Hamburg. The family was comfortable financially; Henry had a nanny and was educated at a French-speaking lycée. When he was 10, his father went to Panama, and the rest of the family moved to Germany to live with Margit's family. Spira joined a Jewish youth group and began to learn Hebrew.

His father sent for them in 1938; he had opened a store selling cheap clothes and jewellery, mostly to sailors, and Germany was an increasingly unsafe place for Jews. Henry was sent to a Roman Catholic school run by nuns, where lessons were conducted in Spanish, until his father ran out of money and could no longer afford the fees. He spent the next year working in his father's store.

=== New York and Hashomer Hatzair ===
When he was thirteen, in December 1940, the family set sail for New York via Havana on the SS Copiapo. His father worked in the diamond industry there, and they rented an apartment on West 104th Street. Henry was sent to public school. He continued to study Hebrew – paying for lessons himself with vacation jobs – had his Bar Mitzvah ceremony, and wore a kippah.

In 1943, while at Stuyvesant High School, he became involved with Hashomer Hatzair, a left-wing, non-religious, Zionist group that helped to prepare young Jews to live on kibbutzim in Palestine. There were summer camps, where they hiked, were taught how to farm, and learned about gender equality. Australian philosopher Peter Singer writes that the anti-materialism and independence of mind that Spira learned from his time with Hashomer Hatzair – where he went by his Hebrew name, Noah – stayed with him for the rest of his life. Spira decided to leave home when he was sixteen, taking lodgings and an afternoon job in a machine shop, and attending school in the mornings.

=== Merchant navy and army life ===
In 1944, Spira became a supporter of the Socialist Workers Party (SWP). He and fellow activist John Black recruited New York City high school students to the SWP. He became a merchant seaman in 1945, joining other Trotskyists who were active in the National Maritime Union (NMU). When communist and left-leaning union members and leaders were purged from the NMU during the McCarthy era, he was blacklisted as a security risk; in March 1952, he was told that his presence on an American merchant vessel was "inimical to the security of the U.S. government." He later told Peter Singer, "I just figured it was part of the game: Fight the system and they get even with you."

He was drafted into the U.S. Army, serving in Berlin from 1953 to 1954, where he was assigned to speak to several hundred troops each week about news and current affairs. After two years in the Army, he worked at the General Motors (GM) factory in Linden, New Jersey on the assembly line. While working at GM, Spira said that he observed the power that individuals could exercise when they acted independently of an organization.

=== Activism ===
==== Journalism and human rights activism ====
During the 1950s and 1960s, Spira wrote for the SWP's newspaper, The Militant, and other leftist and alternative publications, often under the name Henry Gitano. He covered a United Auto Workers strike in New Castle, Indiana, during 1955, in which striking workers were injured and martial law was declared. He also wrote extensively about the civil rights movement in Montgomery, Alabama, and Tallahassee, Florida, in 1956, during the bus boycott; and about the larger fight against segregation and for voting rights through the 1960s. He was known for talking directly to people involved in struggles and relaying their stories, and for building bridges between the labor and civil rights movements.

Between 1958 and 1959, The Militant published a series of articles he wrote about the FBI abuses of power under the leadership of J. Edgar Hoover. Singer suggests that the broader impact of the series beyond the narrow readership of the socialist newspaper taught Spira a lesson: that "careful research can often turn up internal contradictions in what a large organization says and does."

Spira traveled to Cuba in 1958 shortly after Fidel Castro and his followers ousted Fulgencio Batista, writing about the changes he was witnessing, which "reflected the exhilarating early days of the revolution, before American hostility had pushed Castro into the arms of the Soviet Union and led him to repress opposition." Spira was the first American journalist to travel to Cuba and interview Castro after the revolution. His writing led the SWP and other leftists to form the Fair Play for Cuba Committee, which worked to inform Americans about Cuba and prevent a U.S. invasion. Two weeks before the Bay of Pigs Invasion, Spira warned of preparations involving CIA coordination with Cuban exiles."

Spira was also involved in the Committee for NMU Democracy in the early 1960s, during a time when dissidents faced beatings and threats of violence by supporters of union president Joseph Curran. Spira wrote exposés of the ways in which Curran was "ripping off" union members, inspiring dissidents and rank-and-file workers within the NMU and in other trade unions."

In 1958, he graduated as a mature student from Brooklyn College in New York, and in 1966 began teaching English literature in a Manhattan public high school.

==== Animal rights activism ====
Spira took out this ad in The New York Times on 15 April 1980, leading Revlon to begin the search for alternatives to the Draize test.

Spira told The New York Times that he first became interested in animal rights in 1973 while looking after Nina, a friend's cat: "I began to wonder about the appropriateness of cuddling one animal while sticking a knife and fork into another."

Around the same time, he read a column by Irwin Silber in The Guardian, a left-wing newspaper in New York (now closed) about an article on 5 April 1973 by the Australian philosopher Peter Singer in The New York Review of Books. Singer's article was a review of Animals, Men and Morals (1971) by three Oxford philosophers, John Harris and Roslind and Stanley Godlovitch. Singer declared the book a manifesto for "animal liberation," thereby coining the phrase.

Spira got hold of Singer's article and felt inspired: "Singer described a universe of more than 4 billion animals being killed each year in the USA alone. Their suffering is intense, widespread, expanding, systematic and socially sanctioned. And the victims are unable to organize in defence of their own interests. I felt that animal liberation was the logical extension of what my life was all about – identifying with the powerless and the vulnerable, the victims, dominated and oppressed."

In 1974, he founded Animal Rights International (ARI) in an effort to put pressure on companies that used animals. He is credited with the idea of "reintegrative shaming", which involves encouraging opponents to change by working with them – often privately – rather than by vilifying them in public. Sociologist Lyle Munro writes that Spira went to great lengths to avoid using publicity to shame companies, using it only as a last resort.

In 1976, he led the ARI's campaign against vivisection on cats that the American Museum of Natural History had been conducting for 20 years, intended to research the impact of certain types of mutilation on the sex lives of cats. The museum halted the research in 1977, and Spira's campaign was hailed as the first ever to succeed in stopping animal experiments.

Another well-known campaign targeted cosmetics giant Revlon's use of the Draize test, which involves dripping substances into animals' eyes, usually rabbits, to determine whether they are toxic. On 15 April 1980, Spira and the ARI took out a full-page ad in the New York Times, with the header, How many rabbits does Revlon blind for beauty's sake? Within a year, Revlon had donated $750,000 to a fund to investigate alternatives to animal testing, followed by substantial donations from Avon, Bristol Meyers, Estée Lauder, Max Factor, Chanel, and Mary Kay Cosmetics, donations that led to the creation of the Center for Alternatives to Animal Testing.

Other campaigns targeted the face branding of cattle, the poultry industry, and fast food giant KFC, with an ad that combined a KFC bucket and a toilet. Spira took a photograph of a primate who had been imprisoned for months in a Bethesda Naval Hospital chair to the Black Star Wire Service, which sent the picture around the world. It was shown to Indira Gandhi, India's PM, who cancelled monkey exports to the United States, because the photograph suggested the U.S. Navy was violating a treaty with India that forbade military research on animals.

Nevertheless, Spira was an advocate of gradual change, negotiating with McDonald's, for example, for better conditions in the slaughterhouses of its suppliers. He proved especially adept at leveraging the power of the larger animal welfare organizations, such as the Humane Society of the United States, to advance his campaigns.

In 1982, he quit teaching to become a full-time animal rights activist.

=== Death ===
Spira died of esophageal cancer in 1998, at the age of 71.

== See also ==
- List of animal rights advocates
