= New approach methodologies =

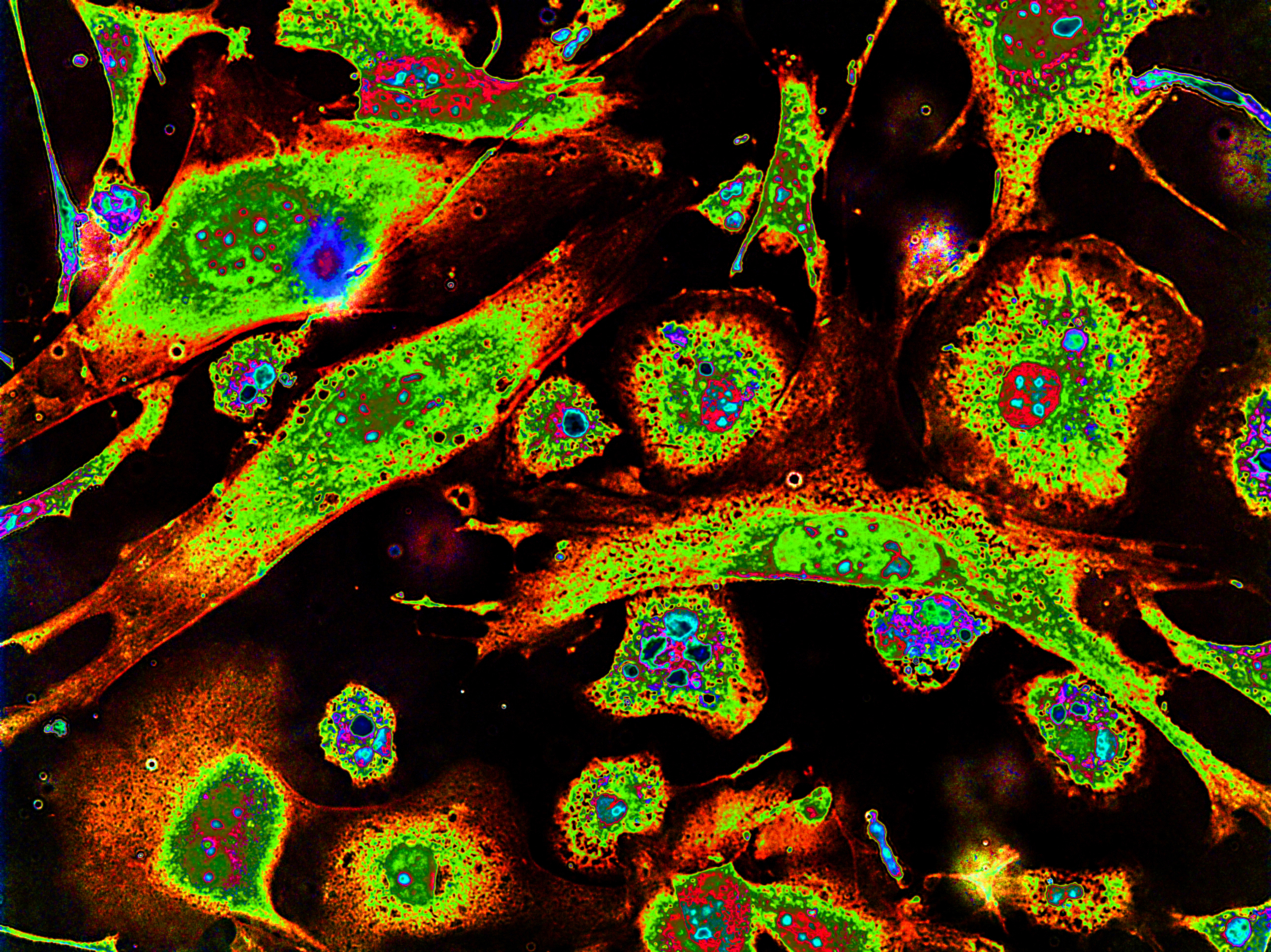
Example of NAM 2D co-culture of epithelioid cells and macrophages.

New approach methodologies (NAMs) are alternative testing protocols, technologies, and strategies that are in alignment with the 3Rs principles (Replacement, Reduction and Refinement) for the ethical use of animal models. Both the Food and Drug Administration (FDA) and the European Medicines Agency (EMA), the two principal authorities in global pharmaceutical regulation, have established frameworks to facilitate the evaluation and potential integration of these NAMs into regulatory pipelines.

NAMs comprise basic 2D cell-based assays, advanced 3D in vitro human-derived systems such as organoids or organs-on-a-chip, predictive in silico computational models such as QSAR and omics such as transcriptomics technologies among other techniques. By using these human-derived biological models, NAMs are designed to predict human health outcomes, lower operational costs, and accelerate drug development schedules.

== History ==
The conceptual foundation for modern alternatives to animal testing was established in 1959 by British zoologist William M. S. Russell and microbiologist Rex L. Burch in their book The Principles of Humane Experimental Technique, where they introduced the "3Rs" framework:

- Replacement: Utilizing non-animal models or systems wherever possible to achieve the same scientific objective.
- Reduction: The aim is to minimize the number of animals used without compromising scientific quality.
- Refinement: Modifying experimental procedures to minimize potential pain, suffering, or distress to the animals involved.

During the late 20th and early 21st centuries, rapid advancements in molecular biology, computer science, and biological engineering created new avenues for scientific inquiry that did not require animal models. In 2007, the National Research Council (NRC) published a landmark report titled Toxicity Testing in the 21st Century: A Vision and a Strategy. The report advocated for a transition away from traditional animal-based models toward evaluating cellular and molecular "toxicity pathways" using human cells and computational models.

The specific acronym "NAM" initially stood for "New Approach Methodologies" and was largely popularized within regulatory science. One of the first instances of this concept being used was during a 2016 workshop organized by the European Chemicals Agency in Helsinki, titled New Approach Methodologies in Regulatory Science, establishing the term NAMs within regulatory frameworks. It is also known that some research institutions within the field expanded the acronym to mean "Non-Animal Models" or "Novel Alternative Methods" to describe its growing application in broader biomedical research. Additionally, a series of new regulatory updates and technical milestones have firmly integrated NAMs into main drug development pipelines.

== NAMs core technologies ==
Multiple technologies compliant with NAMs are available, mainly innovative non-animal technologies and methodologies and testing strategies used within the biomedical research field. These technologies encompass in vitro models, in silico and computational models and new high-throughput tools such as omics technologies.

=== 2D cell-based assays ===
2D cell-based assays are 2D cell culture methods that use living cells growing in a flat and single layer of cells attached to a rigid surface of plastic such as cell culture flasks or multi-well plates with 6, 24, 48, 96 or even more independent wells. Cells are spread horizontally across the bottom of a specific rigid surface and are directly exposed to their suitable cell culture media. Once cells are attached, they proliferate and release compounds into the media that could be measured and quantified.

Historically, 2D cell-based assays have been the primary source for NAMs for their high-throughput compatibility, their easy standardization and reproducibility and cost efficiency. The following are examples of different readouts that can be performed with 2D cell culture:

- Cell viability and cytotoxicity - Live/Dead: This assay evaluates the baseline health of a cell population by measuring metabolic activity or cell membrane integrity to determine if a substance is inherently lethal to human cells.
- Protein level - ELISA: This method utilizes specific antibody-antigen bindings to precisely quantify the concentration of target proteins, enzymes, or inflammatory cytokines secreted by cells in response to chemical exposure.
- High-content imaging - Immunofluorescence: This microscopy technique uses fluorescent-tagged antibodies to visualize and track spatial, structural, and phenotypic changes within fixed cells.
- High-throughput screening - qPCR: This method uses fluorescent dyes to measure the DNA concentration in real-time as the amplification is happening.

=== Advanced 3D in vitro platforms ===
Unlike traditional 2D cell culture techniques, these advanced 3D cell culture platforms allow cells to grow, migrate and interact in all directions mimicking the in vivo microenvironment, including the extracellular matrix. These platforms bridge the translational gap between conventional 2D cell cultures and complex, living tissue physiology.

==== Organoids ====
Organoids are 3D in vitro cellular structures derived from stem cells or organ-specific progenitor cells that replicate the spatial architecture and functional characteristics of in vivo organs through a process of self-organization. The physiological relevance of organoids is driven by their 3D cellular architecture, long-term expansion potential, and applicability across a wide spectrum of tissue types.

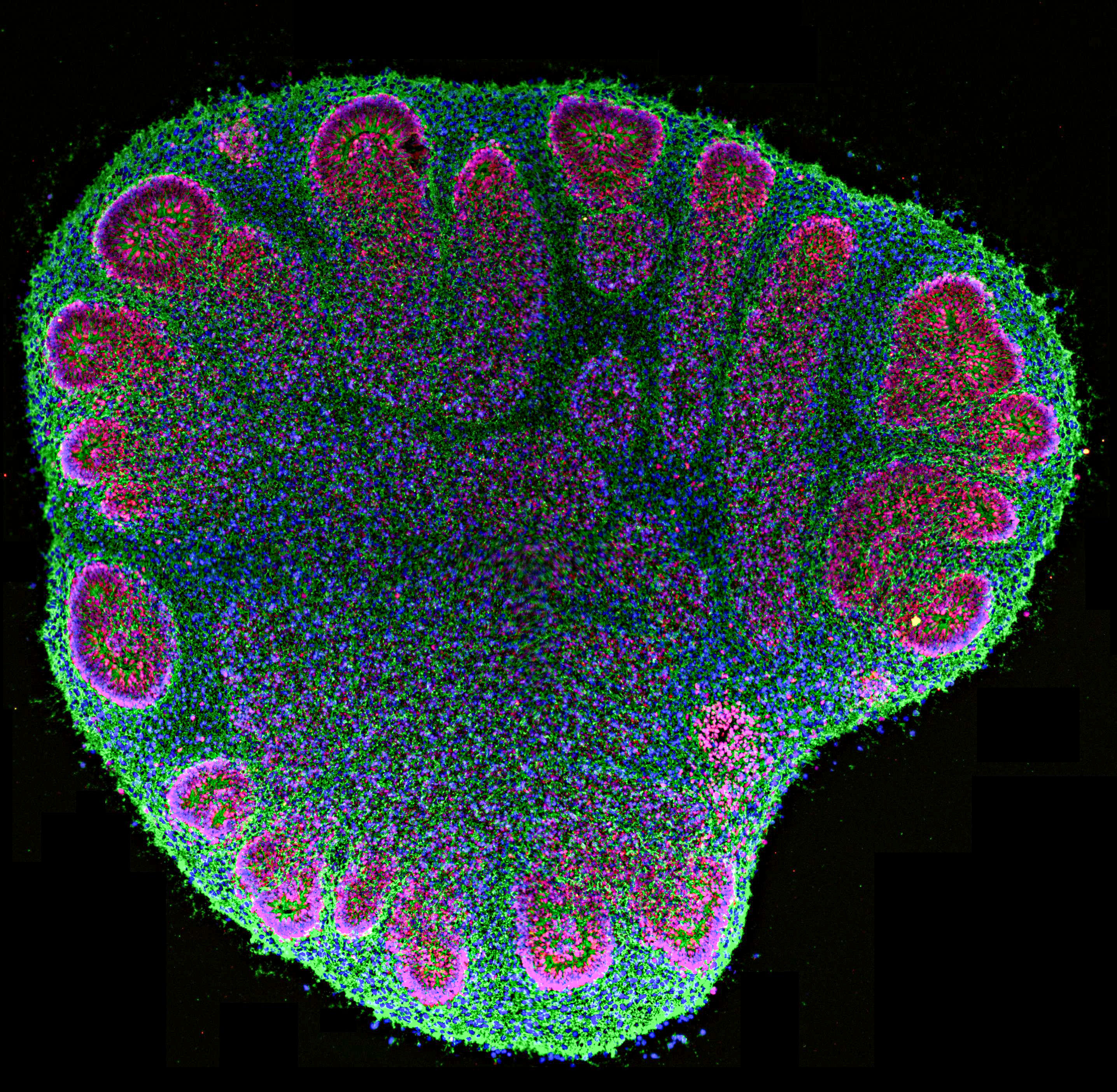
Cerebral organoid observed under a fluorescence microscope.

Some of the main historical milestones in the successful generation of major organoid tissue types are listed below:

- Cerebral cortex: complex and multi-layered human brain organoids.
- Intestine: recapitulation of intestinal microenvironment and architecture.
- Liver: vascularized and functional liver buds.
- Lung: bronchioalveolar stem cell organoids.
- Retina: self-organized stratified optic cup and retinal tissue.
- Stomach: gastric organoids derived from primary stem cells.

Organoid technologies are subject to specific technical and structural limitations. The spontaneous nature of the self-organization process can introduce variability in the geometric uniformity, structural dimensions, and morphological replication of target organs.

==== Organ-on-a-chip ====
Organs-on-a-chip (OoCs) are microfluidic devices made of highly biocompatible materials, such as polydimethylsiloxane (PDMS), to achieve 3D microenvironments that are beneficial to cells. This spatial configuration facilitates complex cell-to-cell signaling interactions that are typically absent in conventional 2D cultures, thereby increasing the fidelity of organ-level simulations. By combining localized 3D structures with dynamic physiological forces and controlled microenvironments, these microfluidic models enable the replication of tissue-to-tissue interface responses critical to human organ physiology.

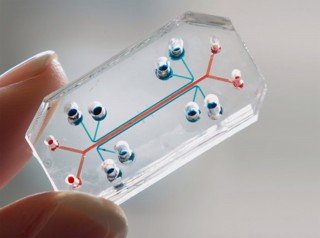
Example of organ-on-a-chip made of PDMS.

One of the main differences between OoCs and organoids is the ability to replicate specific mechanical cues into the microtissues. These forces include fluid shear stress, simulating blood flow through the cell culture media, and mechanical strains such as compression or stretching, simulatingm physiological events such as the heartbeat, breathing, and movement.

These platforms can be fluidically interconnected to link multiple distinct tissue- or organ-specific compartments. These devices can handle co-cultures of multiple cell types within localized microenvironments. This integration enables the development of complex multicellular models that preserve high degrees of physiological relevance for biomedical and toxicological research.

=== In silico computational modeling ===
In silico modeling within NAMs uses tools from bioinformatics, systems biology, and other systems to construct computed simulations of cellular, sub-cellular, and organ-level processes. This approach relies on information-rich, high-throughput biological data to mathematically describe the interactions among all molecular components within a biological system.

==== QSAR ====
Quantitative structure-activity relationship (QSAR) models are computational, mathematical tools that predict the biological activity, toxicity, or physicochemical properties of untested chemical compounds based on their molecular structures. The fundamental premise of QSAR is that the biological effects of a chemical are a direct function of its structural characteristics, and translates molecular chemistry directly into predictive biological outcomes in silico.

=== Omics technology ===
Omics technologies encompass a suite of high-throughput molecular biology methods used to detect, map, and analyze the comprehensive biological profiles of cells, tissues, or organisms. Rather than focusing on single isolated variables, omics techniques capture global, systemic data layers. Omics technologies are now driving precision medicine through biomarker discovery, diagnosis, prognosis, and treatment personalization.

==== Genomics ====
Genomics was the first omics field to develop; it consists of the comprehensive study of an organism's complete DNA sequence. In safety assessments, genomic mapping identifies baseline genetic sequences, hereditary variations, and potential structural abnormalities or mutations induced by external chemical stresses.

Key technologies for genomics are Next-Generation Sequencing (NGS) platforms that are widely used to decode whole genomes. High-throughput Sanger sequencing is employed for targeted gene validation, while DNA microarrays are used to detect single nucleotide polymorphisms (SNPs) across large sample cohorts.

==== Transcriptomics ====
Transcriptomics is the large-scale analysis of all RNA transcripts produced by a cell population at a specific point in time. This discipline tracks immediate, dynamic changes in gene expression and regulation following exposure to a xenobiotic compound, highlighting which cellular pathways are being activated or suppressed.

Omics technologies associated with biological processes.

Modern transcriptomics technologies rely on high-throughput platforms such as RNA sequencing (RNA-Seq) and high-density microarrays. These experimental pipelines process millions of RNA fragments simultaneously, translating complex biological cell reactions into standardized digital datasets that feed directly into in silico safety models.

==== Proteomics ====
Proteomics is the systemic identification and quantification of the complete set of proteins expressed by a biological system. It evaluates changes in translation, protein-protein interactions, and post-translational modifications that reflect cellular damage or structural responses.

Key technologies for proteomics include Liquid chromatography-mass spectrometry (LC-MS), that serves as the core instrumentation platform for identifying and quantifying complex protein mixtures.

==== Metabolomics ====
Metabolomics is the profiling of low-molecular-weight chemical compounds and metabolic products present within a cell or tissue. As the downstream endpoint of gene and protein expression, metabolomics measures the direct physiological phenotype and biochemical perturbations occurring in cellular metabolism.

Metabolic phenotypes are captured using high-resolution Nuclear Magnetic Resonance (NMR) spectroscopy or Mass Spectrometry (MS) platforms. These spectrometers are routinely coupled with separation sciences, such as Gas Chromatography-Mass Spectrometry (GC-MS) or High-Performance Liquid Chromatography (HPLC), to isolate and analyze polar and non-polar metabolic components within cellular extracts.

== Regulatory alignment and policy ==
Despite technical advancements in in vitro, in silico, and multi-omics platforms, NAMs are not yet universally accepted across all global regulatory jurisdictions. The transition from established animal models to alternative computational and cellular models involves the integration within international legal frameworks, historical data reliance, and standardized verification requirements. Consequently, the regulatory adoption of NAMs varies significantly depending on the geographical region and the specific chemical sector, such as cosmetics, industrial chemicals, or pharmaceuticals.

The Organisation for Economic Co-operation and Development (OECD) acts as a central body for international harmonization through its Test Guidelines Programme. The OECD evaluates and approves specific NAMs to ensure technical reproducibility. A major component of the OECD's regulatory alignment is the Adverse Outcome Pathway (AOP), defined as a conceptual framework that organizes existing knowledge concerning biologically plausible, and empirically supported, links between molecular-level perturbation of a biological system and an adverse outcome at a level of biological organization of regulatory relevance.

=== Legislation and validation processes ===
In 2009, the European Union implemented a comprehensive ban on testing cosmetic ingredients on animals, followed by a total ban on the marketing of animal-tested cosmetic products in 2013. This regulation forced a legislative pivot toward the usage of exclusively human-relevant NAMs for cosmetic safety assessments.

In late 2022, the FDA Modernization Act 2.0 amended the Federal Food, Drug, and Cosmetic Act of 1938, which had historically mandated animal testing for all new drug development applications. The updated statute explicitly authorizes pharmaceutical developers to utilize qualified NAMs to support Investigational New Drug (IND) applications and clinical trial submissions.

Before a new methodology can be officially integrated into regulatory pipelines, it must undergo formal validation to verify its scientific relevance, sensitivity, and reproducibility across different laboratories. The specific governmental validation centers that manage this process are:

- Interagency Coordinating Committee on the Validation of Alternative Methods (ICCVAM): Operating within the United States under the National Toxicology Program Interagency Center, ICCVAM coordinates the technical evaluation of alternative testing methods across 17 federal regulatory and research agencies, including the FDA.
- European Union Reference Laboratory for Alternatives to Animal Testing (EURL ECVAM): Established under the Joint Research Centre of the European Commission, EURL ECVAM manages the validation of NAMs within the European Union. The laboratory coordinates scientific research, manages independent peer reviews, and provides technical recommendations to regulatory authorities regarding the validity of specific in vitro and in silico safety assessment tools.

== See also ==
- In silico
- Organoids
- Organ-on-a-chip
- Transcriptomics technologies
