= Canadian Centre for Alternatives to Animal Methods =

Research centre for alternatives to animal testing

- Abbreviation: CCAAM
- Formation: 2017
- Defunct: 2024
- Purpose: Development of alternatives to animal testing
- Location: Windsor, Ontario, Canada
- Executive Director: Charu Chandrasekera
- Affiliations: University of Windsor
- Website: www.uwindsor.ca/ccaam/

The Canadian Centre for Alternatives to Animal Methods (CCAAM) was a research centre founded in 2017 and based at the University of Windsor, in Canada. Its goal was "to develop, validate, and promote laboratory methods and techniques that don't use animal test subjects". It was the first centre in Canada dedicated to non-animal testing and the promotion of human-relevant alternatives. The CCAAM ceased operations on May 31, 2024 due to budget cuts at the University of Windsor.

== Mission and projects ==
The CCAAM's mission was based on three pillars:

- scientific research relying exclusively on human-based biomaterials and human biology-based methodologies, including human cells, stem cells, tissues from cadavers, biopsies, and explanted organs from surgeries;
- academic training for scientists, ethicists, regulators, and policy makers, including development of a one-year masters programme;
- regulatory initiatives for changing chemical safety methods in Canada, with academic, industry, government, and public partnerships.

One of its main focuses of research is diabetes, using “human stem cells to create diabetes in a dish”. The CCAAM is opposed to animal testing based on ethical and scientific reasons. The director, biochemist Dr. Charu Chandrasekera who specializes in heart disease and diabetes, states that “Ninety-five per cent of drugs tested to be safe and effective in animal models fail in human clinical trials”.

== Funding ==
In 2018, it received a $1 million donation from the Eric S. Margolis Family Foundation, considered “the largest research donation in University of Windsor history”, part of which will be used to create a research and training facility.

== See also ==
- Alternatives to animal testing
- Center for Alternatives to Animal Testing
- Pain and suffering in laboratory animals
- Animal testing regulations
