= European Partnership for Alternative Approaches to Animal Testing =

Belgian animal welfare organization

European Partnership for Alternative Approaches to Animal Testing (EPAA)
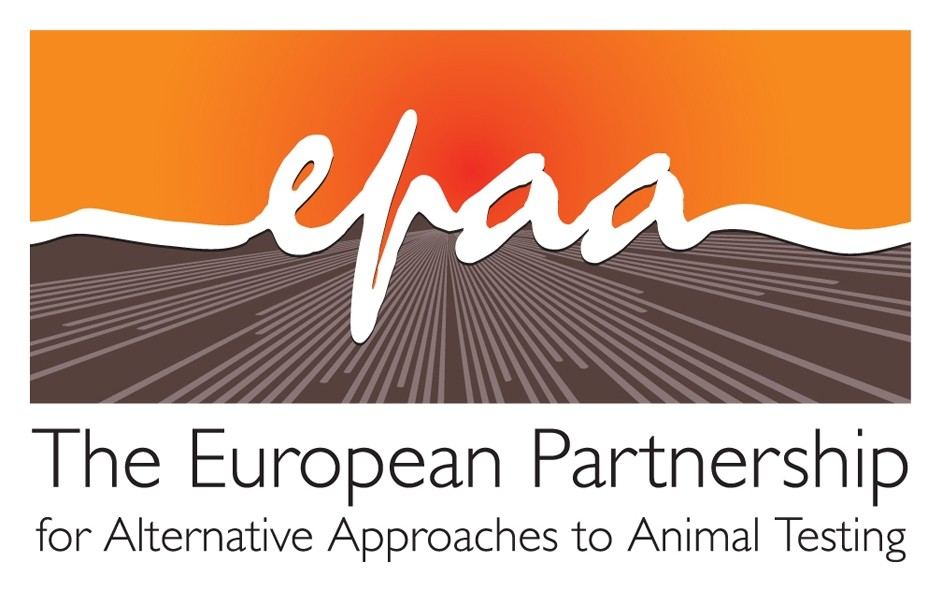
- Formation: November 2005; 21 years ago
- Headquarters: Brussels, Belgium
- Members: 5 European Commission DGs; 7 industry sectors 37 companies
- Chair: Dr Tzutzuy Ramirez (BASF); Gwenole Cozigou (European Commission)
- Website: ec.europa.eu/growth/sectors/chemicals/epaa

European Partnership for Alternative Approaches to Animal Testing (EPAA) promotes the application of the 3Rs principles (Replacement, Reduction, and Refinement of animal testing) in meeting regulatory requirements for products such as pharmaceuticals, chemicals, soaps, detergents and cosmetics. The EPAA covers research and development, as well as the use of 3Rs approaches in regulatory compliance and communication and dissemination.

== History ==
The EPAA was created in 2005. European Commissioners Janez Potocnik, Gunter Verheugen and Dagmar Roth-Behrendt, the then Vice President of the European Parliament, supported the establishment and launch of the EPAA.

The EPAA is currently in its second mandate covering a 5 year period (2011–2015).

== Structure and membership ==
The EPAA is a public-private partnership involving the European Commission (EC) and European industry sectors involved in the development of alternative approaches toward animal experimentation. The actions undertaken by the EPAA arise from communication and cooperation between services of the EC and industry, focused on regulatory compliance, with the involvement of NGOs, academia and regulators from third countries. To maintain transparency of its activities and an external perspective, the EPAA has a mirror group composed of independent members from academia, animal welfare groups, laboratory animal science associations and national authorities.

Members of the EPAA as of March, 2012 included five Directorates-General of the EC, 36 companies and six European trade associations representing various sectors of the industry

== European background ==
In recent decades, legislation aimed at the promotion of the 3Rs in regulatory testing have systematically been introduced into Europe. EU Directive 2010/63/EU updates and replaces the 1986 Directive 86/609/EEC on the protection of animals used for scientific purposes. The aim of the new Directive is to strengthen legislation, improve the welfare of those animals still needed to be used, as well as to firmly anchor the principles of the 3Rs in EU legislation.

In 2003, legislation introduced a ban on using animals for testing cosmetics. Current and consolidated regulations on cosmetics and animal testing are laid down in the Cosmetics Regulation 1223/2009.

=== European chemicals legislation ===
Registration, Evaluation, Authorization and Restriction of Chemicals (REACH) is a European Union regulation of 18 December 2006. Even stricter provisions were laid down for plant protection products.

European regulatory agencies such as the European Medicines Agency, the European Chemicals Agency, and the European Food Safety Authority are involved in the implementation of EU legislation. They adopted policy documents on the 3Rs, such as the concept paper on the Need for Revision of the Position on the Replacement of Animal Studies by in vitro Models (CPMP/SWP/728/95) from the EMA Committee for Medicinal Products for Human Use, the EFSA opinion on Existing approaches incorporating replacement, reduction and refinement of animal testing: applicability in food and feed risk assessment or the ECHA's Practical guide "How to avoid unnecessary testing on animals".

== International context ==
EPAA industry partners, interested in global approaches, provide input and data to the international harmonization process to achieve international regulatory convergence. EPAA partners also carried out a feasibility study allowing the Organisation for Economic Co-operation and Development (OECD) to adopt its guideline on the extended one generation reproductive toxicity study. EPAA companies play a significant role with authorities in the EPAA project on the improved consistency approach for vaccines.

== Activities ==
The EPAA organizes its activities around a yearly lead theme. For 2011, the lead theme was “Integrated testing strategies and their impact on the 3Rs”. The theme for 2012 was "Global implementation of 3Rs methodologies through international cooperation". The EPAA focuses on selected priority areas. Typical examples include :

- Consistency approach for improved vaccine quality control
- Acute toxicity testing
- Support to the acceptance of the Extended One Generation Reproductive Toxicity Study (EOGRTS)
- New perspectives on safety, making use of computational chemistry, systems biology and stem cells

== See also ==
- Alternatives to animal testing
