= Fund for the Replacement of Animals in Medical Experiments =

UK charity

Replacing animal Research
- Abbreviation: FRAME
- Formation: 1969
- Type: Charity
- Purpose: Animal welfare
- Headquarters: Nottingham
- Region served: United Kingdom
- Budget: £800,805
- Staff: 6
- Website: https://replacinganimalresearch.org.uk/

In October 2024, Fund for the Replacement of Animals in Medical Experiments (FRAME) changed their name to Replacing Animal Research.

Replacing Animal Research is a charity based in Nottingham, UK, they fund and promotes alternatives to animal testing.

Replacing Animal Research was founded in London in 1969 by animal lover Dorothy Hegarty to promote and assist research into new techniques and valid scientific substitutes to replace animal research in medical, biological and pharmaceutical research.

Now, Replacing Animal Research focuses on three core areas of change: funding research, education, and policy work.

== History ==
Replacing Animal Research was founded as FRAME by Dorothy Hegarty, who was introduced to the Three Rs by the biologist Charles Foister. It was registered as a UK charity in 1969. Replacing Animal Research had a starting fund of £100 and was first based in a room in the Hegarty house in Wimbledon, London. Eventually, money from donations provided a salary for a secretary. Soon, enough funds were available for FRAME to rent a shop in Worple Rd, Raynes Park, London where it was based for almost a decade.

1978 - FRAME held a symposium at the Royal Society on the Use of Alternatives in Drug Research.

1981 - Michael Balls became Chairman of the FRAME trustees and FRAME moved to Nottingham. Soon after, a research programme and links with the University of Nottingham were established.

1979 - The FRAME Toxicity Committee presented its first report on alternatives to using animals for toxicity testing at the Animals and Alternatives in Toxicity Testing conference, organised by FRAME, and held at the Royal Society in 1982.

1983 - ATLA (Alternatives to Laboratory Animals) relaunched With the help of funding from the Maurice Laing Foundation. ATLA, formerly a pamphlet style publication, was relaunched as a peer-reviewed international scientific journal.

1983 - FRAME joined with the British Veterinary Association (BVA) and the Committee for the Reform of Animal Experimentation (CRAE) to advise the government on the Animals (Scientific Procedures) Act 1986.

1984 - FRAME receives first ever government grant to research replacement methods

1986 - FRAME expanded into new premises on the 1st floor of Eastgate House in the historic Lace Market area of Nottingham. In the same year, FRAME received the first Marchig Animal Welfare Award from the World Society for the Protection of Animals (Now known as World Animal Protection). The following year, Michael Balls became one of the founder members of the Animals Procedures Committee.

1989 - INVITTOX, a collection of protocols for in vitro methods in toxicology, was established. This database is now part of ECVAM's Scientific Information Service.

1991 - The FRAME Alternatives Laboratory (FAL) opened to conduct research into alternatives.

1995 - The FRAME office relocated to the newly built Russell & Burch House, Nottingham.

1998 - FRAME became a founder member of Focus on Alternatives. This body promotes dialogue between all UK groups that focus on replacement alternatives.

1999 - Bill Russell delivered the first annual FRAME Lecture at the Royal Society of Medicine. In 2005, the Annual Lecture was renamed the Bill Annett Lecture in memory of Bill Annett, and in recognition of his lifelong commitment to FRAME.

2000-2003 - EU regulators accepted the first three replacement alternatives to animal-based toxicity testing. One of these, a phototoxicity test, had been validated in a 1997 study that involved the FAL.

2007 - The new FRAME Alternatives Laboratory opened at the University of Nottingham Medical School.

2013 - Dr Anna Cadogan took over as Acting Chair of Trustees following the resignation of Professor Michael Balls.

2021 - FRAME joins the Alliance for Human Relevant Science

2022 - FRAME joins The Coalition to Illuminate and Address Animal Methods Bias

2024 - As part of The Coalition to Illuminate and Address Animal Methods Bias, FRAME wins a Lush Prize for Major Science Collaboration

== Funding ==
Replacing Animal Research receives no direct funding from local or central government and relies entirely on donations, legacies and corporate support. A list of its current corporate supporters is available in its annual report each year.

== Bibliography ==
- William Russell and Rex Burch (1959) The Principles of Humane Experimental Technique. London: Methuen. ISBN 978-0-900767-78-4 (paperback edition)
