= In Vitro Cellular & Developmental Biology =

In Vitro Cellular & Developmental Biology – Animal
- Discipline: Life sciences, cell biology
- Language: English
- Edited by: Tetsuji Okamoto

Publication details
- History: 1965-present
- Publisher: Springer Science+Business Media
- Frequency: 10/year
- Impact factor: 2.1 (IVAN) (2022)

Standard abbreviations
- ISO 4: In Vitro Cell. Dev. Biol. Animal
- NLM: In Vitro Cell Dev Biol Anim

Indexing
- ISSN: 1071-2690 (print); 1543-706X (web)

Links
- Journal homepage

In Vitro Cellular & Developmental Biology – Plant
- Discipline: Life sciences, plant sciences
- Language: English
- Edited by: David D. Songstad, Samir Debnath

Publication details
- History: 1965-present
- Publisher: Springer Science+Business Media
- Frequency: Bimonthly
- Impact factor: 2.6 (2022)

Standard abbreviations
- ISO 4: In Vitro Cell. Dev. Biol. Plant

Indexing
- ISSN: 1054-5476 (print); 1475-2689 (web)

Links
- Journal homepage

In Vitro Cellular & Developmental Biology is a peer-reviewed scientific journal covering all aspects of in vitro biology. It was originally established as In Vitro in 1965, acquiring its current name in 1983. In 1991, In Vitro Cellular & Developmental Biology – Plant was created, with the original section renaming itself In Vitro Cellular & Developmental Biology – Animal in 1993. The journals are published by Springer Science+Business Media on behalf of the Society for In Vitro Biology.

According to the Journal Citation Reports, in 2022, the animal section of the journal had an impact factor of 2.1, while the Plant had an impact factor of 2.6.
