= Interagency Coordinating Committee on the Validation of Alternative Methods =

The Interagency Coordinating Committee on the Validation of Alternative Methods (ICCVAM) coordinates U.S. federal government evaluation of new, revised, and alternative test methods. Alternative methods are methods for safety testing of chemicals and chemical products that use fewer or no animals or that minimize or prevent animal pain and distress.

== Establishment of ICCVAM ==
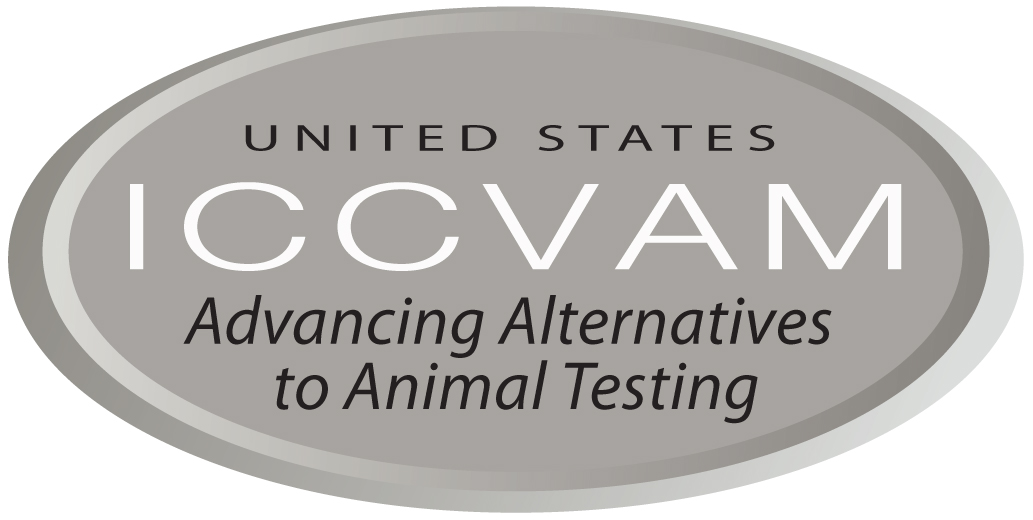
ICCVAM logo

The ICCVAM Authorization Act of 2000 created ICCVAM to "establish, wherever feasible, guidelines, recommendations, and regulations that promote the regulatory acceptance of new or revised scientifically valid safety testing methods that protect human and animal health and the environment while reducing, refining, and replacing animal tests and ensuring human safety and product effectiveness". This Act addressed directives in the NIH Revitalization Act of 1993 requiring that the National Institute of Environmental Health Sciences (NIEHS) establish criteria for the validation and regulatory acceptance of alternative test methods. ICCVAM is a permanent interagency committee under NIEHS and receives administrative and scientific support from the National Toxicology Program Interagency Center for the Evaluation of Alternative Toxicological Methods (NICEATM).

== ICCVAM Agencies ==
- National Institute of Environmental Health Sciences
- Agency for Toxic Substances and Disease Registry
- Consumer Product Safety Commission
- Environmental Protection Agency
- National Library of Medicine
- Food and Drug Administration
- National Institutes of Health
- National Cancer Institute
- National Institute for Occupational Safety and Health
- Occupational Safety and Health Administration
- Department of Agriculture
- Department of Defense
- Department of Energy
- Department of the Interior
- Department of Transportation

== ICCVAM Activities and Accomplishments ==
ICCVAM has evaluated and developed recommendations to U.S. federal agencies on alternative tests for substances that can cause skin and eye injuries or allergic contact dermatitis, as well as non-animal tests to identify potential pyrogens and endocrine disruptors. ICCVAM has also convened workshops to facilitate acceptance and use of alternatives for vaccine testing and to assess the usefulness of aquatic models and adverse outcome pathways for high-throughput non-animal testing approaches.

ICCVAM facilitates international collaboration on the development of alternative test methods through its membership in the International Cooperation on Alternative Test Methods and ICCVAM agency participation in the Test Guidelines Programme of the Organisation for Economic Co-operation and Development.

ICCVAM produces biennial reports summarizing its activities. These reports are available on the National Toxicology Program website; the last report was published in July 2014 and describes ICCVAM activities in 2012 and 2013.

== ICCVAM Stakeholders and Communication ==
ICCVAM relies on stakeholders to carry out alternative test method research, development, and validation studies. ICCVAM's stakeholders include:

- U.S. Federal agencies that generate, require, or use toxicity data
- Agencies within governments of other countries that use or generate toxicity data
- Researchers and Institutional Animal Care and Use Committee (IACUC) members in companies or research institutions that perform toxicity testing
- Companies that develop toxicity tests
- Animal welfare organizations
- Consumer protection organizations
- The public

ICCVAM meets 8-10 times per year. Opportunities for stakeholders to interact with committee members include:

- An annual Public Forum
- Communities of Practice webinars
- The annual meeting of its advisory committee, the Scientific Advisory Committee on Alternative Toxicological Methods

ICCVAM reports and summaries of current ICCVAM activities are available on the National Toxicology Program website. An email list informs stakeholders of ICCVAM activities and other news of interest to developers and users of alternative test methods.
