= Animal products in pharmaceuticals =

Animal products in pharmaceuticals play a role as both active and inactive ingredients, the latter including binders, carriers, stabilizers, fillers, and colorants. Animals and their products may also be used in pharmaceutical production without being included in the product itself.

The religious, cultural, and ethical concerns of patients and the disclosure of animal ingredients in pharmaceuticals are a growing area of concern for some people. These would include people who abide by veganism ("vegans"), the practice of abstaining from the use of animal products. Vegan medicines are medications and dietary supplements that do not have any ingredients of animal origin. The vegan status can be determined either through self-proclamation of the company or certification from a third-party organization, such as The Vegan Society or PETA.

== Desire for ingredient information ==
There is public interest in knowing whether medications and supplements contain animal-sourced ingredients. In a study of 100 people, 84% reported not knowing that several medications contained ingredients derived from animal sources. Nearly 63% of the people wanted their physicians, and 35% of the people wanted other healthcare providers (pharmacists, nurses), to notify them when using such medications. Alternatives exist for many animal-derived ingredients, and healthcare providers are increasingly incorporating awareness around animal-free drugs in their medical practice.

A 2013 study in the BMC Medical Ethics contacted branches of six of the world's largest religions. Of the six religions contacted, respondents from three did not accept or approve of the use of animal products in pharmaceuticals. The authors concluded that:

...religious codes conflict with some treatment regimens. It is crucial to obtain informed consent from patients for the use of drugs and implants with animal or human derived content. However, information on the origin of ingredients in drugs is not always available to health practitioners.

Similarly, a 2014 BMJ analysis on the topic discussed the lack of information about ingredients available to doctors. According to the article, "Most medications prescribed in primary care contain animal derived products" and "Disclosure of animal content and excipients would help patients make an informed personal choice"

== Active ingredients in drugs and dietary supplements ==
=== Biomedicine ===
- Insulin from cattle and pigs has been used since the 1920s, and was the predominant form of insulin used for decades. The first synthetic human insulin was created using bacteria in 1978. In the United States, the manufacture of beef insulin was discontinued in 1998, and the manufacture of pork insulin was discontinued in 2006.
- Premarin, a hormone replacement therapy, is a conjugated estrogen. It was first available in the form of a preparation manufactured from the urine of pregnant mares - hence "Premarin" from "PREgnant MARe's urINe". It is now also made as a fully synthetic product.

=== Dietary supplements ===
- Glucosamine, used in dietary supplements marketed for osteoarthritis, is extracted from chitin from shellfish. Non-animal sourced glucosamine is also available.
- Cartilage as a dietary supplement is by definition animal-sourced. Shark cartilage is marketed explicitly or implicitly as a treatment or preventive for various illnesses, including cancer. There is no consensus that shark cartilage is useful in treating or preventing cancer or other diseases.

=== Traditional Chinese Medicine ===
Traditional Chinese Medicine (TCM) utilizes approximately 1,000 plant species and 36 animal species. Animal ingredients in TCM include animal parts such as tiger bones, rhino horns, deer antlers, and snake bile. The use of animal parts in TCM have been definitively linked to the extinction of wildlife. One example of this link is the pangolin trade, which has led the pangolin to be called the world's "most trafficked mammal." In 2020, pangolin scales were removed from the Chinese list of ingredients approved for use in Traditional Chinese Medicine.

=== Homeopathic medicine ===
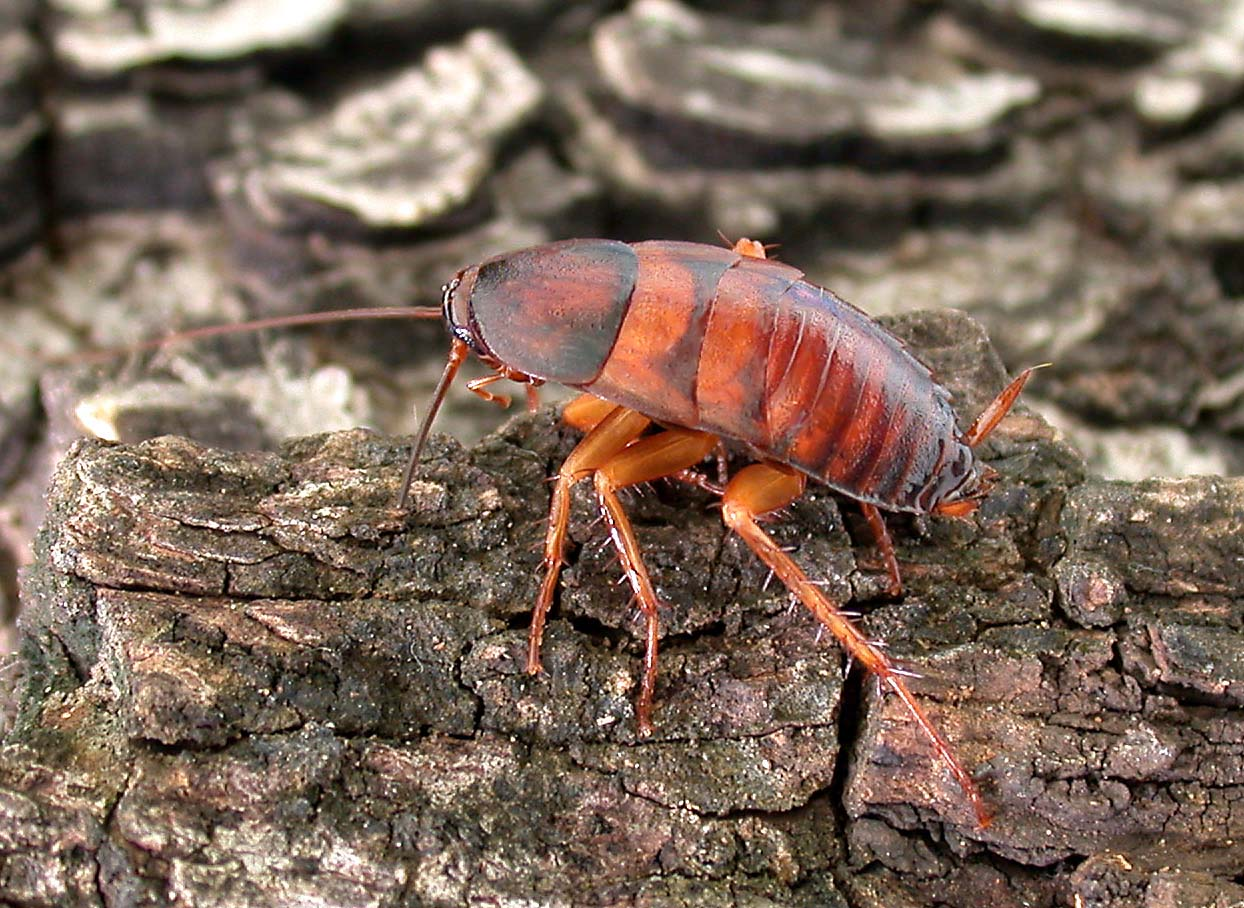
Blatta Orientalis

Homeopathic medicine is made of plants, minerals, or animal parts. Oscillococcinum, a remedy purported to reduce cold and flu like symptoms, is made of duck heart and liver. There is also use of insects in homeopathic medicine, such as Blatta orientalis, a type of cockroach which has been studied by homeopaths for anti-asthmatic effects.

== Inactive ingredients ==
- Gelatin is derived from animal skin, bone, and tissue most often from pigs or beef. There is no practical way of determining if the gelatin used in pharmaceuticals is derived from beef or pork. It is used primarily for gel capsules and as stabilizers for vaccines. Non-animal derived alternatives to gelatin include pectin as a gelling agent or cellulose for creating capsules.
- Lactose is derived from cow's milk and is a frequently used filler or binder in tablets and capsules.
- Magnesium stearate is the most commonly used emulsifier, binder, thickener, or lubricant. It can be derived from animal- or plant-sourced stearic acid, although it is most commonly sourced from cottonseed oil or palm oil.
- Sodium tallowate is a common soap ingredient derived from tallow—the fat of animals such as cattle and sheep. A popular alternative to this ingredient is sodium palmate, which is derived from palm oil. Soap is a pharmaceutical according to the United States Food and Drug Administration.
- Shellac is a resin excreted by female insects of the species Kerria lacca. It is used as a glazing agent on pills.
- Carmine, derived from crushed cochineal beetles, is a red or purple substance commonly used in pharmaceutical products. Evidence shows that it can be allergenic. Carmine is an allergen according to the US Food and Drug Administration (FDA). The FDA requires this ingredient to be declared in food and cosmetics, but not pharmaceuticals.

== Animal use during product development or production ==
A separate issue is the use of testing on animals as a means of initial testing during drug development, or actual production. Guiding principles for more ethical use of animals in testing are the Three Rs first described by Russell and Burch in 1959. These principles are now followed in many testing establishments worldwide.

1. Replacement refers to the preferred use of non-animal methods over animal methods whenever it is possible to achieve the same scientific aim.
2. Reduction refers to methods that enable researchers to obtain comparable levels of information from fewer animals, or to obtain more information from the same number of animals.
3. Refinement refers to methods that alleviate or minimize potential pain, suffering, or distress, and enhance animal welfare for the animals used.

Cow blood is used in vaccine manufacture. Microorganisms for vaccine manufacture are grown under controlled conditions in liquid solutions ("media") which provide the nutrients necessary for growth. These can include cow plasma. Chicken eggs are used in the production process of some vaccines. For influenza vaccination there are non-egg alternatives.

== See also ==
- Biopharmaceutical
- Animal rights by country or territory
- Animal rights in Jainism, Hinduism, and Buddhism
- Alpha-gal allergy
