= Federation of European Laboratory Animal Science Associations =

Animals Laboratory of Europe

- Formation: 1978
- Website: felasa.eu

The Federation of European Laboratory Animal Science Associations is a pan-European stakeholder organisation, representing common interests in the furtherance of laboratory animal science in Europe and beyond. The organisation was founded in 1978 and is an umbrella organisation for European national or multinational associations.

== Members ==
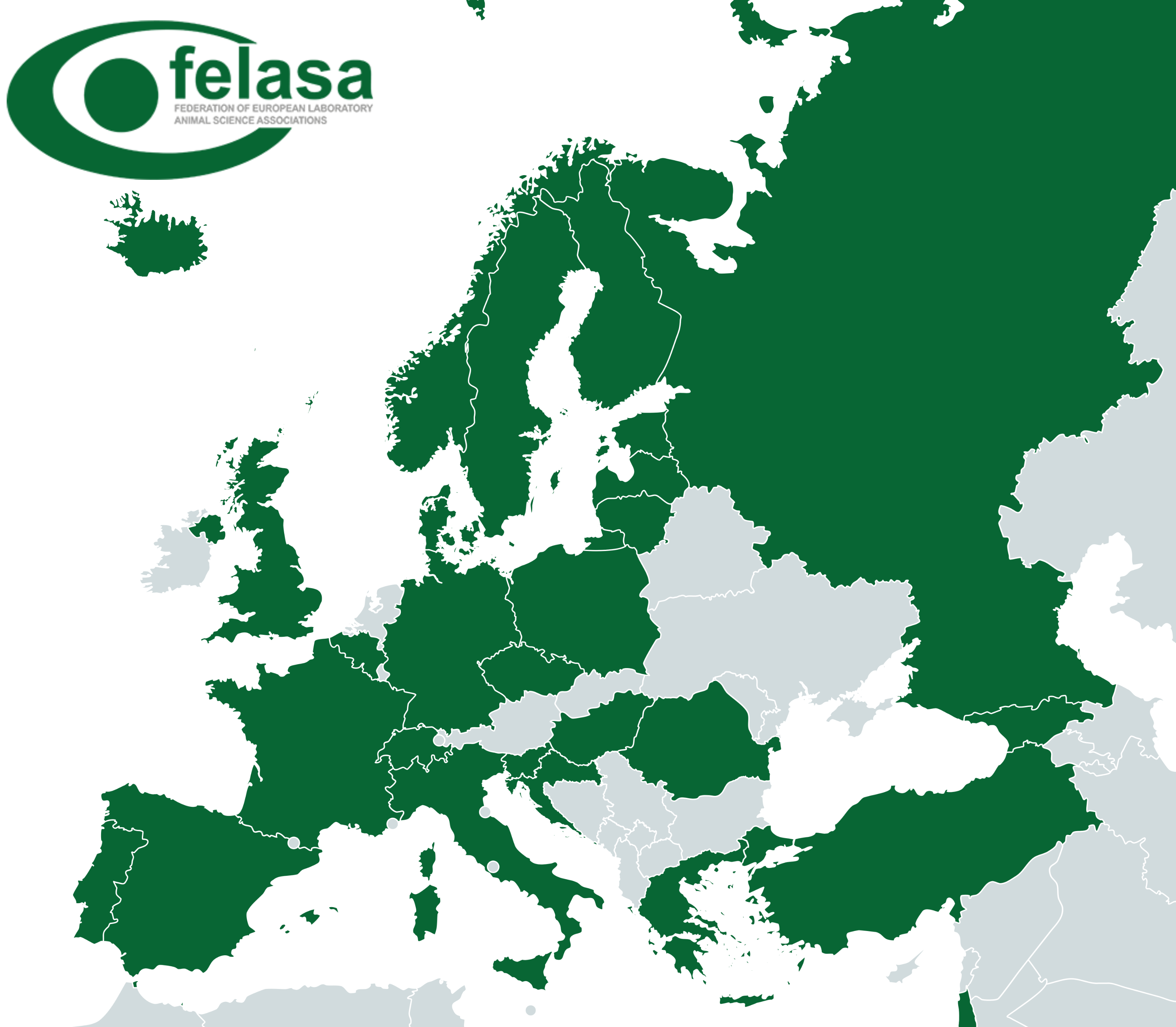

As of May 2020, the federation consisted of 22 member associations, representing 29 countries.

- Association Française des Sciences et Technique de l'Animal de Laboratoire
- Associazione Italiana per Scienze degli Animali da Laboratorio
- Asociatia Romana pentru Stiinta Animalelor de Laborator
- Baltic Laboratory Animal Science Association
- Belgian Council for Laboratory Animal Science
- Czech Laboratory Animal Science Association
- Croatian Laboratory Animal Science Association
- Dutch Association for Laboratory Animal Science
- Gesellschaft für Versuchstierkunde
- Georgian Association for Laboratory Animal Science
- Hungarian Laboratory Animal Science Association
- Hellenic Society of Biomedical and Laboratory Animal Science
- Israeli Laboratory Animal Forum
- Laboratory Animal Science Association (United Kingdom)
- Polish Laboratory Animal Science Association
- Russian Laboratory Animal Science Association
- Scandinavian Society for Laboratory Animal Science
- Schweizerische Gesellschaft für Versuchstierkunde
- Slovenian Association for Laboratory Animals
- Sociedad Española para las Ciencias del Animal de Laboratorio
- Sociedade Portuguesa de Ciências em Animas de Laboratório
- Türkiye Laboratuvar Hayvanları Bilimi Derneği (Turkey)
