= MIMIC (immunology) =

MIMIC, or modular immune in vitro construct, is an artificial system imitating the human immune system. It has applications in vaccine development.

White blood cells, specifically peripheral blood mononuclear cells including T cells and B cells, from human donors are placed in standard tubes containing specially designed tissue constructs made out of collagen, where they develop into small but functioning immune systems. Up to ninety-six individual tubes can be carried on a plate the size of a deck of cards, allowing scientists to use cells from almost a hundred different donors at once.

The MIMIC system replaces some steps in the vaccine development process that would otherwise be performed on animals and offers scientists better speed and flexibility than traditional methods. However, critics are concerned that MIMIC may be too simple for use as widespread as its developers hope.

The MIMIC system was developed by VaxDesign and became available for use in 2008.
