= Office of Laboratory Animal Welfare =

The Office of Laboratory Animal Welfare (OLAW) oversees the care and use of research animals in any public or private organization, business, or agency (including components of Federal, state, and local governments). OLAW implements the policy set forth by the Public Health Service. The PHS Policy on Humane Care and Use of Laboratory Animals (Policy) requires institutions to establish and maintain proper measures to ensure the appropriate care and use of live vertebrate animals involved in biomedical and behavioral research testing or training activities conducted or supported by the PHS. The PHS Policy endorses the "U.S. Government Principles for the Utilization and Care of Vertebrate Animals Used in Testing, Research, and Training" developed by the Interagency Research Animal Committee (IRAC).

OLAW provides guidance and interpretation of the PHS Policy, supports educational programs, and monitors compliance with the Policy by Assured institutions and PHS funding components to ensure the humane care and use of animals in PHS-supported research, testing, and training, thereby contributing to the quality of PHS-supported activities.
