= In vitro to in vivo extrapolation =

Experimental technique

In vitro to in vivo extrapolation (IVIVE) refers to the qualitative or quantitative transposition of experimental results or observations made in vitro to predict phenomena in vivo, biological organisms.

The problem of transposing in vitro results is particularly acute in areas such as toxicology where animal experiments are being phased out and are increasingly being replaced by alternative tests.

Results obtained from in vitro experiments cannot often be directly applied to predict biological responses of organisms to chemical exposure in vivo. Therefore, it is extremely important to build a consistent and reliable in vitro to in vivo extrapolation method.

Two solutions are now commonly accepted:

- (1) Increasing the complexity of in vitro systems where multiple cells can interact with each other in order recapitulate cell-cell interactions present in tissues (as in "human on chip" systems).
- (2) Using mathematical modeling to numerically simulate the behavior of a complex system, whereby in vitro data provides the parameter values for developing a model.

The two approaches can be applied simultaneously allowing in vitro systems to provide adequate data for the development of mathematical models. To comply with push for the development of alternative testing methods, increasingly sophisticated in vitro experiments are now collecting numerous, complex, and challenging data that can be integrated into mathematical models.

== Pharmacology ==
IVIVE in pharmacology can be used to assess pharmacokinetics (PK) or pharmacodynamics (PD)..

Since biological perturbation depends on concentration of the toxicant as well as exposure duration of a candidate drug (parent molecule or metabolites) at that target site, in vivo tissue and organ effects can either be completely different or similar to those observed in vitro. Therefore, extrapolating adverse effects observed in vitro is incorporated into a quantitative model of in vivo PK model. It is generally accepted that physiologically based PK (PBPK) models, including absorption, distribution, metabolism, and excretion of any given chemical are central to in vitro - in vivo extrapolations.

In the case of early effects or those without inter-cellular communications, it is assumed that the same cellular exposure concentration cause the same effects, both experimentally and quantitatively, in vitro and in vivo. In these conditions, it is enough to (1) develop a simple pharmacodynamics model of the dose–response relationship observed in vitro and (2) transpose it without changes to predict in vivo effects.

However, cells in cultures do not mimic perfectly cells in a complete organism. To solve that extrapolation problem, more statistical models with mechanistic information are needed, or we can rely on mechanistic systems of biology models of the cell response. Those models are characterized by a hierarchical structure, such as molecular pathways, organ function, whole-cell response, cell-to- cell communications, tissue response and inter-tissue communications.
