= In vitro toxicology =

Scientific analysis

In vitro toxicity testing is the scientific analysis of the toxic effects of chemical substances on cultured bacteria or mammalian cells. In vitro (literally 'in glass') testing methods are employed primarily to identify potentially hazardous chemicals and/or to confirm the lack of certain toxic properties in the early stages of the development of potentially useful new substances such as therapeutic drugs, agricultural chemicals and food additives.

In vitro assays for xenobiotic toxicity are recently carefully considered by key government agencies (e.g., EPA; NIEHS/NTP; FDA), to better assess human risks. There are substantial activities in using in vitro systems to advance mechanistic understanding of toxicant activities, and the use of human cells and tissue to define human-specific toxic effects.

== Improvement over animal testing ==
Most toxicologists believe that in vitro toxicity testing methods can be more useful, more time and cost-effective than toxicology studies in living animals (which are termed in vivo or "in life" methods). However, the extrapolation from in vitro to in vivo requires some careful consideration and is an active research area.

Due to regulatory constraints and ethical considerations, the quest for alternatives to animal testing has gained a new momentum. In many cases the in vitro tests are better than animal tests because they can be used to develop safer products.

The United States Environmental Protection Agency studied 1,065 chemical and drug substances in their ToxCast program (part of the CompTox Chemicals Dashboard) using in silica modelling and a human pluripotent stem cell-based assay to predict in vivo developmental intoxicants based on changes in cellular metabolism following chemical exposure. Major findings from the analysis of this ToxCast_STM dataset published in 2020 include: (1) 19% of 1065 chemicals yielded a prediction of developmental toxicity, (2) assay performance reached 79%–82% accuracy with high specificity (> 84%) but modest sensitivity (< 67%) when compared with in vivo animal models of human prenatal developmental toxicity, (3) sensitivity improved as more stringent weights of evidence requirements were applied to the animal studies, and (4) statistical analysis of the most potent chemical hits on specific biochemical targets in ToxCast revealed positive and negative associations with the STM response, providing insights into the mechanistic underpinnings of the targeted endpoint and its biological domain.

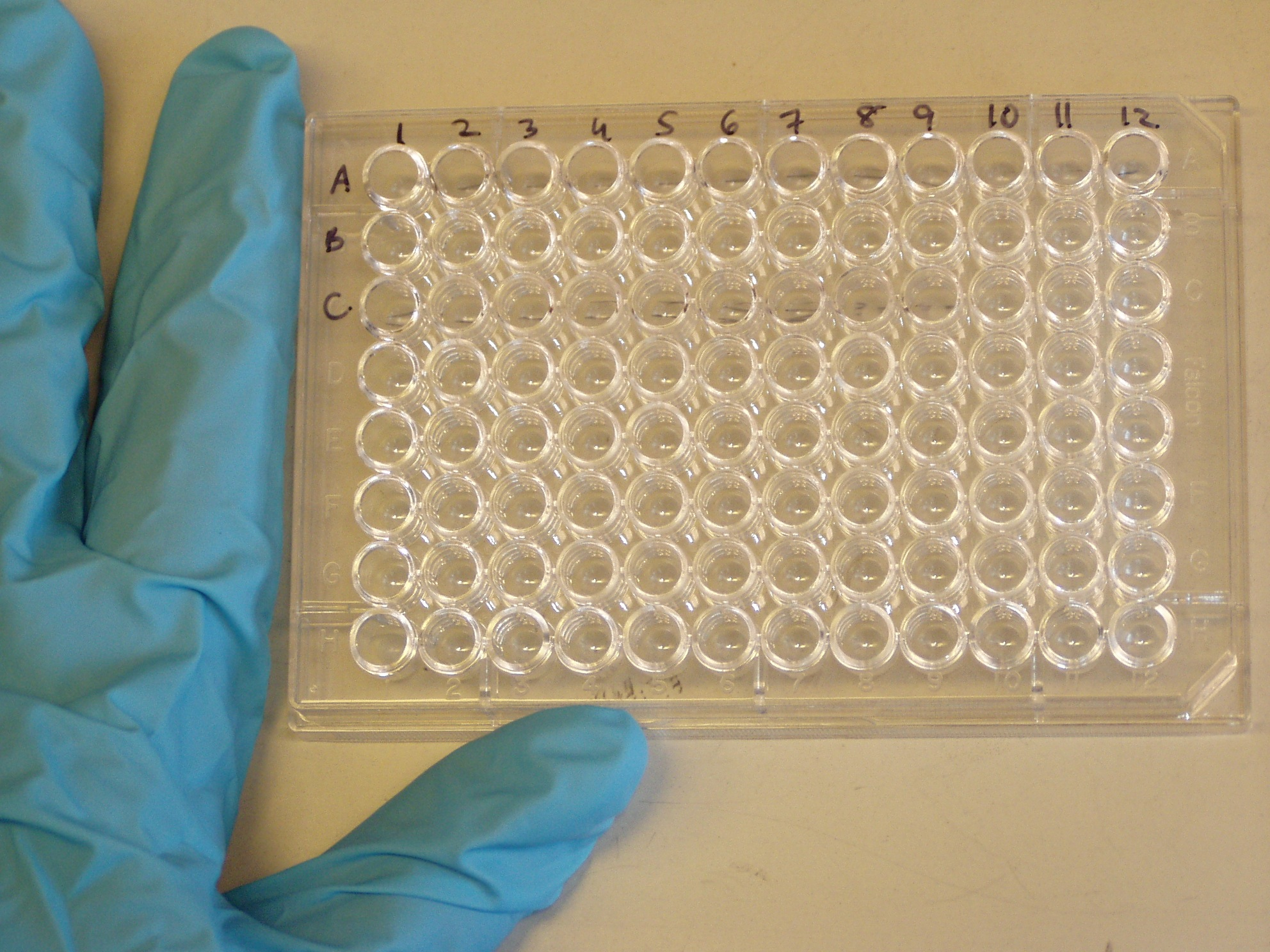
A 96-well microtiter plate being used for ELISA.

== Examples of cell viability and other cytotoxicity assays used for in-vitro toxicology ==
Many methods of analysis exist for assaying test substances for cytotoxicity and other cellular responses.

=== Hemolysis assay ===
The hemolysis assay examines the propensity of chemicals, drugs or medication, or any blood-contacting medical device or material to lyse red blood cells (erythrocytes). The lysis is easily detected due to the release of hemoglobin.

=== MTT and MTS ===
MTT assay is used often in determining cell viability and has been validated for use by international organisations. MTT assay involves two steps of introducing the assay to the chemicals and then a solubilisation step.

The colorimetric MTS (3-(4,5-dimethylthiazol-2-yl)-5-(3-carboxymethoxyphenyl)-2-(4-sulfophenyl)-2Htetrazolium) in vitro assay is an updated version of the validated MTT method, MTS assay has the advantage of being soluble. Hence, no solubilisation step is required.

=== ATP ===
ATP assay has the main advantage of providing results quickly (within 15 minutes) and only requires fewer sample cells. The assay performs lysis on the cells and the following chemical reaction between the assay and ATP content of cells produces luminescence. The amount of luminescence is then measured by a photometer and can be translated into number cells alive since

- ATP assay assumes alive cells still have ATP inside them, and
- Luminescence level recorded is proportional to the ATP content in the sample cells.

=== Neutral red ===
Another cell viability endpoint can be neutral red (NR) uptake. Neutral red, a weak cationic dye penetrates cellular membranes by non-diffusion and accumulates intercellularly in lysosomes. Viable cells take up the NR dye, damaged or dead cells do not.

=== Cytokine quantification via ELISA ===
ELISA kits can be used to examine up and down regulation of proinflammatory mediators such as cytokines (IL-1, TNF alpha, PGE2)....

Measurement of these types of cellular responses can be windows into the interaction of the test article on the test models (monolayer cell cultures, 3D tissue models, tissue explants).

== Types of in vitro studies ==
Broadly speaking, there are two different types of in vitro studies depending on the type system developed to perform the experiment. The two types of systems generally used are : a) Static well plate system and b) the multi-compartmental perfused systems.

=== Static well plate system ===
The static well plate or layer systems are the most traditional and simplest form of assays widely used for in vitro study. These assays are quite beneficial as they are quite simple and provide a very accessible testing environment for monitoring chemicals in the culture medium as well as in the cell. However the disadvantage of using these simple static well plate assays is that, they cannot represent the cellular interactions and physiologic fluid flow conditions taking place inside the body.

=== Multi-compartmental perfused systems ===
New testing platforms are now developed to solve problems related to cellular interactions. These new platforms are much more complex based on multi-compartmental perfused systems. The main objective of these systems is to reproduce in vivo mechanisms more reliably by providing cell culture environment close to the in vivo situation. Each compartment in the system represent a specific organ of the living organism and thus each compartment has a specific characteristics and criteria. Each compartment in these systems are connected by tubes and pumps through which the fluid flows thus mimicking the blood flow in the in vivo situation. The draw back behind the use of these perfused systems is that, the adverse effects ( influence of both the biological and non-biological components of the system on the fate of the chemical under study) are more compared to the static systems. In order to reduce the effect of non-biological components of the system, all the compartments are made of glass and the connecting tubes are made up of teflon. A number of kinetic models have been proposed to take care of these non-specific bindings taking place in these in vitro systems.

To improve the biological difficulties arising from the use of different culture in vitro conditions, the traditional models used in flasks or micro-well plates has to be modified. With parallel development in micro-technologies and tissue engineering, these problems are solved using new pertinent tools called "micro-fluidic biochips".
