= Draize test =

Cosmetics toxicity test performed on animals

- Purpose: Test cosmetics (allergic/toxic reaction)

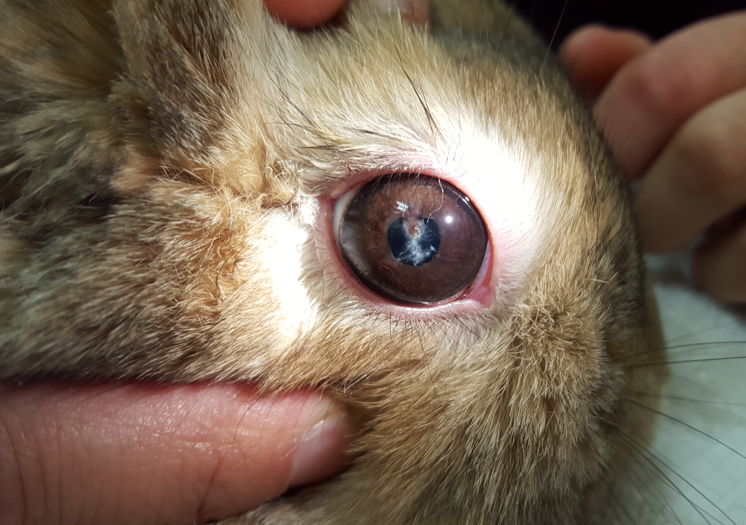
Rabbit with an eye infection caused by Encephalitozoon cuniculi (phacoclastic uveitis)

The Draize test is an acute toxicity test devised in 1944 by Food and Drug Administration (FDA) toxicologists John H. Draize and Jacob M. Spines. Initially used for testing cosmetics, the procedure involves applying 0.5 mL or 0.5 g of a test substance to the eye or skin of a restrained, conscious animal, and then leaving it for a set amount of time before rinsing it out and recording its effects. The animals are observed for up to 14 days for signs of erythema and edema in the skin test, and redness, swelling, discharge, ulceration, hemorrhaging, cloudiness, or blindness in the tested eye. The test subject is commonly an albino rabbit, though other species are used too, including dogs. The animals are euthanized after testing if the test renders irreversible damage to the eye or skin. Animals may be re-used for testing purposes if the product tested causes no permanent damage. Animals are typically reused after a "wash out" period during which all traces of the tested product are allowed to disperse from the test site.

The tests are controversial. They are viewed as cruel as well as unscientific by critics because of the differences between rabbit and human eyes, and the subjective nature of the visual evaluations. The FDA supports the test, stating that "to date, no single test, or battery of tests, has been accepted by the scientific community as a replacement [for] ... the Draize test". Because of its controversial nature, the use of the Draize test in the U.S. and Europe has declined in recent years and is sometimes modified so that anaesthetics are administered and lower doses of the test substances used. Chemicals already shown to have adverse effects in vitro are not currently used in a Draize test, thereby reducing the number and severity of tests that are carried out.

== Background ==
John Henry Draize (1900–1992) obtained a BSc in chemistry then a PhD in pharmacology, studying hyperthyroidism. He then joined the University of Wyoming and investigated plants poisonous to cattle, other livestock, and people. The U.S. Army recruited Draize in 1935 to investigate the effects of mustard gas and other chemical agents.

In 1938, after a number of reports of coal tar in mascara leading to blindness, the U.S. Congress passed the Federal Food, Drug, and Cosmetic Act, placing cosmetics under regulatory control. The following year Draize joined the FDA, and was soon promoted to head of the Dermal and Ocular Toxicity Branch where he was charged with developing methods for testing the side effects of cosmetic products. This work culminated in a report by Draize, his laboratory assistant, Geoffrey Woodard, and division chief, Herbert Calvery, describing how to assess acute, intermediate, and chronic exposure to cosmetics by applying compounds to the skin, penis, and eyes of rabbits.

Following this report, the techniques were used by the FDA to evaluate the safety of substances such as insecticides and sunscreens and later adopted to screen many other compounds. By Draize's retirement in 1963, and despite never having personally attached his name to any technique, irritancy procedures were commonly known as "the Draize test" To distinguish the target organ, the tests are now often referred to as "the Draize eye test" and "the Draize skin test".

== Reliability ==
In 1971, before the implementation in 1981 of the modern Draize protocol, toxicologists Carrol Weil and Robert Scala of Carnegie Mellon University distributed three test substances for comparative analysis to 24 different university and state laboratories. The laboratories returned significantly different evaluations, from non-irritating to severely irritating, for the same substances. A 2004 study by the U.S. Scientific Advisory Committee on Alternative Toxicological Methods analyzed the modern Draize skin test. They found that tests would:

- Misidentify a serious irritant as safe: 0–0.01%
- Misidentify a mild irritant as safe: 3.7–5.5%
- Misidentify a serious irritant as a mild irritant: 10.3–38.7%

== Descriptions of the test ==
=== Anti-testing ===
According to the American National Anti-Vivisection Society, solutions of products are applied directly into the animals' eyes, which can cause "intense burning, itching and pain". Clips are placed on the rabbits' eyelids to hold them open during the test period, which can last several days, during which time the rabbits are placed in restraining stocks. The chemicals often leave the eyes "ulcerated and bleeding". In the Draize test for skin irritancy, the test substances are applied to skin that is shaved and abraded (several layers of skin are removed with sticky tape), then covered with plastic sheeting.

=== Pro-testing ===
According to the British Research Defence Society, the Draize eye test is now a "very mild test", in which small amounts of substances are used and are washed out of the eye at the first sign of irritation. In a letter to Nature, written to refute an article saying that the Draize test had not changed much since the 1940s, Andrew Huxley wrote: "A substance expected from its chemical nature to be seriously painful must not be tested in this way; the test is permissible only if the substance has already been shown not to cause pain when applied to skin, and in vitro pre-screening tests are recommended, such as a test on an isolated and perfused eye. Permission to carry out the test on several animals is given only if the test has been performed on a single animal and a period of 24 hours has been allowed for injury to become evident."

== Differences between the rabbit eye and the human eyes ==
Kirk Wilhelmus, professor in the Department of Ophthalmology at Baylor College of Medicine, conducted a comprehensive review of the Draize eye test in 2001. He also reported that differences in anatomy and biochemistry between the rabbit and human eye indicate that testing substances on rabbits might not predict the effects on humans. However, he noted "that eyes of rabbits are generally more susceptible to irritating substances than the eyes of humans" making them a conservative model of the human eye. Wilhelmus concluded "The Draize eye test ... has assuredly prevented harm" to humans, but predicts it will be "supplanted as in vitro and clinical alternatives emerge for assessing irritancy of the ocular surface".

== Alternatives ==
Industry and regulatory bodies responsible for public health are actively assessing animal-free tests to reduce the requirement for Draize testing. Before 2009 the Organisation for Economic Co-operation and Development (OECD) had not validated any alternative methods for testing eye or skin irritation potential. However, since 2000 OECD had validated alternative tests for corrosivity, meaning acids, bases and other corrosive substances are no longer required to be Draize tested on animals. The alternative tests include a human skin equivalent model and the transepicutaneous resistance test (TER). In addition, the use of human corneal cell line (HCE-T cells) is also another good alternative method to test eye irritation on potential chemicals.

In September 2009 the OECD validated two alternatives to the Draize eye test: the bovine cornea opacity test (BCOP) and isolated chicken eye test (ICE). A 1995 study funded by the European Commission and British Home Office evaluated these among nine potential replacements, including the hens' egg chorioallantoic membrane (HET-CAM) assay and an epithelial model cultivated from human corneal cells, in comparison with Draize test data. The study found that none of the alternative tests, taken alone, proved to be a reliable replacement for the animal test.

Positive results from some of these tests have been accepted by regulatory bodies, such as the British Health and Safety Executive and US Department of Health and Human Services, without testing on live animals, but negative results (no irritation) required further in vivo testing. Regulatory bodies have therefore begun to adopt a tiered testing strategy for skin and eye irritation, using alternatives to reduce Draize testing of substances with the most severe effects.

== Regulations ==
=== UK ===
In Britain, the Home Office publishes guidelines for eye irritancy tests, with the aim of reducing suffering to the animals. In its 2006 guidelines, it "strongly encourages" in vitro screening of all compounds before testing on animals, and mandates the use of validated alternatives when available. It requires that the test solution's "physical and chemical properties are not such that a severe adverse reaction could be predicted"; therefore "known corrosive substances or those with a high oxidation or reduction potential must not be tested."

The test design requires that the substance be tested on one rabbit initially, and the effect of the substance on the skin must be ascertained before it can be introduced into the eye. If a rabbit shows signs of "severe pain" or distress it must be immediately killed, the study terminated and the compound may not be tested on other animals. In tests where severe eye irritancy is considered likely, a washout should closely follow testing in the eye of the first rabbit. In the UK, any departure from these guidelines requires prior approval from the Secretary of State.

== See also ==
- LD_{50} test
