= Canadian Council on Animal Care =

Canadian organization

- Abbreviation: CCAC
- Formation: 1968
- Location: Ottawa, Ontario, Canada
- Region served: Canada
- Website: Official website

The Canadian Council on Animal Care (CCAC) is a Canadian organization that is responsible for "setting and maintaining standards for the care and use of animals in science" within the country. The organization provides ethical standards for the usage of nonhuman animals in laboratories. Its goal is to prevent harmful conduct on animals.

The CCAC was established in 1968 by the National Research Council at the request of the Medical Research Council. Its initial goal was to "investigate the care and use of experimental animals in Canada", with a mandate "to work for the improvement of animal care and use on a Canada-wide basis". The organization is a non-legislated, participatory, peer review system—all experimental care and use of animals in Canada is subject to its rules and regulations.

The organization explains its position on the use of animals in research:

The use of animals in research, teaching, and testing is acceptable only if it promises to contribute to understanding of fundamental biological principles, or to the development of knowledge that can reasonable by expected to benefit humans or animals. Animals should be used only if the researcher's best efforts to find an alternative have failed. A continuing sharing of knowledge, review of the literature, and adherence to the Russell-Burch '3R' tenet of 'Replacement, Reduction and Refinement' are also requisites. Those using animals should employ the most humans methods on the smallest number of appropriate animals required to obtain valid information.

— Canadian Council on Animal Care, Guide to the Care and Use of Experimental Animals

The CCAC uses assessment panels, which meet with personnel from research institutions such as colleges and universities, to evaluate animal care and use within the facilities. While there, the panels interview individual investigators and observe specific techniques. If an institution does not meet the standards set by the CCAC, then the CCAC issues recommendations to the offending institution, typically for housekeeping or facility maintenance concerns.

In Canada, research involving vertebrates or cephalopods is subject to Canadian Council on Animal Care (CCAC) standards when conducted by institutions participating in the CCAC’s certification program, including federally funded institutions and some private companies. All private companies that do not participate in the program are not required to follow CCAC standards

The CCAC was funded entirely by annual grants from the Medical Research Council and the Natural Sciences and Engineering Research Council, two of Canada's largest granting agencies, from the organization's inception in 1968 to 1994.
