= Cosmetics Directive =

1976 European Union law

Directive 76/768/EEC
- European Union directive
- Title: Directive on the approximation of the laws of the Member States relating to cosmetic products
- Made by: Council
- Made under: Art. 100 (EEC)
- Journal reference: L262, 1976-09-27, pp. 169–200

History
- Date made: 1976-07-27
- Entry into force: 1976-07-30
- Implementation date: 1978-01-30

Preparative texts
- Commission proposal: Com 72/0851 Final
- EESC opinion: C60, 1973-07-26, p. 16
- EP opinion: OJ C40, 1974-04-08, p. 71

Other legislation
- Amended by: External list

Council Directive 76/768/EEC of 27 July 1976 on the approximation of the laws of the Member States relating to cosmetic products (as amended) was the main European Union law on the safety of cosmetics. It was made under Art. 100 (ex Art. 94) of the Treaty of Rome. By agreement, it was also applicable in the European Economic Area.

The directive defined a "cosmetic product" as "any substance or preparation intended for placing in contact with the various external parts of the human body (epidermis, hair system, nails, lips and external genital organs) or with the teeth and the mucous membranes of the oral cavity with a view exclusively or principally to cleaning them, perfuming them or protecting them in order to keep them in good condition, change their appearance or correct body odours." (Art. 1.1)

It was repealed by EC Regulation 1223/2009 on cosmetics with effect from 11 July 2013, with the exception of Article 4b which was repealed with effect from 1 December 2010.

== Main parts ==
The main part of the directive was the different lists of substances in the annexes:

- substances that are banned from use in cosmetics (Annex II)
- substances that are subject to restrictions on their use (Annex III): such substances might only be permitted for certain types of cosmetics, or in certain concentrations, or subject to warning labels, etc.
- permitted colourings (Annex IV)
- permitted preservatives (Annex VI)
- permitted UV filters (Annex VII)

The annexes were regularly amended (57 times up until April 2008) to take account of new data on the safety of particular substances.

== Animal testing ==
The 7th amendment to the law introduced provisions in relation to animal testing. It introduced a legal requirement to the labelling of 26 specific ingredients at certain concentration thresholds. It also prohibited the animal testing for cosmetic products since 2004 and cosmetic ingredients since March 2009. The amendment also prohibited, since 11 March 2009, to market cosmetic products containing ingredients which have been tested on animals. The amendment does not prohibit companies to use animal testing to fulfill regulatory requirements in other countries.

== New Cosmetics Regulation ==
The Cosmetics Directive is replaced by the new Cosmetics Regulation of 30 November 2009. It has to be applied entirely from 11 July 2013 (with some parts earlier).
