= Björn Ekwall =

Swedish cell toxicologist (1940–2000)

Björn Ekwall (13 June 1940 – 19 August 2000) was a Swedish cell toxicologist, known for his pioneering work in in vitro toxicology.

== Biography ==
Ekwall was born in Uppsala in 1940. He studied at Uppsala University Medical School and got his Doctor of Medicine degree in 1969. After a short time, he served as a lecturer at the Department of Anatomy at Uppsala University. He completed his PhD at the same university and was a postdoc for six months at Materials Science Technology Laboratories, Memphis, Tennessee, between 1981 and 1982.

During 1982-1983 he worked as a consultant at the Toxicology Laboratory of the Swedish Food Administration. In 1983 he founded the Cytotoxicology Laboratory (CTLU) in Uppsala.

== Selected work and publications ==
Ekwall is known for his two main projects: Multicentre Evaluation of In Vitro Cytotoxicity (MEIC) and Evaluation-Guided Development of In Vitro Toxicity and Toxicokinetic Tests (EDIT) which became basis for later international EU projects such as ACuteTox, Sens-it-iv and ReProTect. MEIC evaluated the usefulness of in vitro tests for the estimation of human acute systemic toxicity. Started in 1999, the purpose of EDIT was to establish and validate in vitro tests relevant to toxicokinetics and for organ-specific toxicity, to be incorporated into optimal test batteries for the estimation of human acute systemic toxicity.

He has authored and co-authored many publications, including the following:

- Toxicity to HeLa cells of 205 drugs as determined by the metabolic inhibition test supplemented by microscopy, Toxicology, 17 (1980), pp. 273–295
- Preliminary studies on the validity of in vitro measurement of drug toxicity using HeLa cells II. Drug toxicity in the MIT-24 system compared with mouse and human lethal dosage of 52 drug, Toxicology Letters, 5 (1980), pp. 309–317
- MEIC- a new international multicenter project to evaluate the relevance to human toxicity of in vitro cytotoxicity tests, Cell Biology and Toxicology, 5 (1989), pp. 331–347
- Overview of the final MEIC results II. The in vitro/in vivo evaluation, including a selection of a practical battery of cell tests for prediction of acute lethal blood concentrations in human, Toxicology in Vitro, 13 (1999), pp. 665–673
- EDIT: a new international multicenter program to develop and evaluate batteries of in vitro tests for acute and chronic systematic toxicity, ATLA, 27 (1999), pp. 339–349

== Björn Ekwall Memorial Foundation (BEMF) ==
The foundation was established in 2001 by the Scandinavian Society for Cell Toxicology (SSCT) in memory of Björn Ekwall. Since 2020, the Björn Ekwall Memorial Foundation (BEMF) has been an independent fundraising foundation. The foundation rewards Björn Ekwall Memorial Award (BEMA) to the scientist from around the world each year for excellent work in cell toxicology contributing towards the replacement of animal experiments by alternative toxicity tests and approaches.

== Recipients of Björn Ekwall Memorial Award (BEMA) ==
So far, the following scientists have received the BEMA.

| Sr. No. | Name of the recipient | Country | Year |
| 1 | Maria José Gómez-Lechón | Spain | 2002 |
| 2 | Per Kjellstrand | Sweden | 2003 |
| 3 | Hanna Tähti | Finland | 2004 |
| 4 | Hasso Seibert and Michael Gülden | Germany | 2005 |
| 5 | Cecilia Clemedson | Sweden | 2006 |
| 6 | Rodger Curren | USA | 2007 |
| 7 | Erik Walum | Sweden | 2008 |
| 8 | Annalaura Stammati | Italy | 2009 |
| 9 | Richard Clothier | UK | 2010 |
| 10 | Päivi Myllynen | Finland | 2011 |
| 11 | Horst Spielmann | Germany | 2012 |
| 12 | Per Artursson | Sweden | 2013 |
| 13 | Tuula Heinonen | Finland | 2014 |
| 14 | Michael Balls | UK | 2015 |
| 15 | Vera Rogiers | Belgium | 2016 |
| 16 | Thomas Hartung | USA | 2017 |
| 17 | Anna Forsby | Sweden | 2018 |
| 18 | Jan Van der Valk | The Netherlands | 2019 |
| 19 | Sandra Coecke | Italy | 2020/21 |
| 20 | Helena Kandarova | Slovakia | 2022 |
| 21 | Marcel Leist | Germany | 2023 |
| 22 | Hanna Vuorenpää | Finland | 2025 |
| 23 | Maria Karlgren | Sweden | 2026 |
