= Gan-Xin Yan =

American cardiologist

Gan-Xin Yan is an American cardiologist, electrophysiologist and cardiovascular research scientist. His studies of arrhythmias have contributed to an understanding of J wave syndromes, long QT syndrome, and other abnormalities that can lead to sudden cardiac death. Yan is a professor at Lankenau Institute for Medical Research (LIMR) and a practicing cardiologist and electrophysiologist at Lankenau Medical Center, both located in Wynnewood, Pennsylvania. He also holds positions as professor of medicine at Sidney Kimmel Medical College of Thomas Jefferson University in Philadelphia and Xi'an Jiaotong University in Xi'an, Shaanxi, China.

Yan earned his MD in 1982 from Hubei Medical College, Xianning School in Xianning, Hubei, China. In 1986, he earned an MSc in physiology from Henan Medical University (now part of Zhengzhou University) in Henan province, and then completed a one-year residency in the discipline. In 1991, he earned a PhD in physiology from the University of Bern in Switzerland. Yan completed a residency in internal medicine in 1999 and a fellowship in cardiovascular disease in 2003, both at Lankenau Medical Center. He joined the LIMR faculty in 2004 as associate professor and was later named professor.

He is a member of the editorial boards of Heart Rhythm, the Journal of Cardiovascular Electrophysiology, and Cardiology.

In 2015, Yan served as co-chair of the J-Wave Syndromes Expert Consensus Conference in Shanghai, China, and edited a medical textbook.
