= Chunying Chen =

Chinese chemist

Chen Chunying
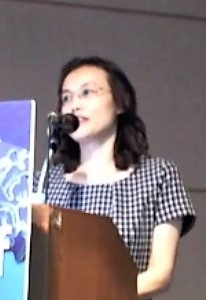
- Chen speaks at the International Society for Nanomedicine in 2016
- Born: June 1969 (age 57); Changchun, Jilin, China
- Education: Huazhong University of Science and Technology
- Scientific career
- Workplaces: Chinese Academy of Sciences; National Center for Nanoscience and Technology; Karolinska Institute

Chen Chunying (simplified Chinese: 陈春英; traditional Chinese: 陳春英; born June 1969) is a Chinese chemist who is a professor at the National Center for Nanoscience and Technology. Her research considers nanoscale biological interactions. She was awarded the 2021 Royal Society of Chemistry Environment, Sustainability and Energy Award. She is a Fellow of the American Institute for Medical and Biological Engineering and the Royal Society of Chemistry.

== Early life and education ==
Chen was born in Changchun, Jilin province in Northeast China. Her parents were both chemists, and she spent part of her childhood in a science laboratory. She was an undergraduate student at the Huazhong University of Science and Technology. She remained at Huazhong for her doctoral research. After graduating she moved to the Chinese Academy of Sciences, where she spent two years as a postdoctoral researcher. In 2001 she was appointed to the Karolinska Institute.

== Research and career ==
In 2002, Chen returned to China, first as a group leader then as a professor at the National Center for Nanoscience and Technology. In 2011, she discovered that carbon nanotubes can absorb proteins in the blood, which was the first indication that it is possible to reduce the toxicity of carbon nanotubes. She studied the interface between proteins and nanomaterials and developed sensitive characterisation techniques to study their chemical transformation.

== Awards and honours ==
- 2014 Chinese Young Female Scientists Award
- 2016 Elected Fellow of the Royal Society of Chemistry
- 2018 Elected General Secretary of the Asian Society of Toxicology
- 2021 Royal Society of Chemistry Environment, Sustainability and Energy Award
- 2021 Elected Fellow of the American Institute for Medical and Biological Engineering
- 2021 The World Academy of Sciences Chemistry Award
- 2021 American Chemical Society Bioconjugate Chemistry Lectureship Award
- 2023 Asian Scientist 100, Asian Scientist

== Selected publications ==
- Jiangxue Wang; Guoqiang Zhou; Chunying Chen; et al. (9 December 2006). "Acute toxicity and biodistribution of different sized titanium dioxide particles in mice after oral administration". Toxicology Letters. 168 (2): 176–185. doi:10.1016/j.toxlet.2006.12.001. ISSN 0378-4274. PMID 17197136. Wikidata Q51771964.
- Zhen Chen; Huan Meng; Gengmei Xing; et al. (14 November 2005). "Acute toxicological effects of copper nanoparticles in vivo". Toxicology Letters. 163 (2): 109–120. doi:10.1016/j.toxlet.2005.10.003. ISSN 0378-4274. PMID 16289865. Wikidata Q81484464.
- Feng Zhao; Ying Zhao; Ying Liu; Xueling Chang; Chunying Chen; Yuliang Zhao (26 April 2011). "Cellular uptake, intracellular trafficking, and cytotoxicity of nanomaterials". Small. 7 (10): 1322–1337. doi:10.1002/smll.201100001. ISSN 1613-6810. PMID 21520409. Wikidata Q37869062.

=== Books ===
- Biomedical applications and toxicology of carbon nanomaterials. ISBN 978-3-527-33871-9. OL 29297784M. Wikidata Q33112974.
