= Helena Kandarova =

Slovak toxicologist and researcher

- Education: Slovak University of Technology, Freie Universität Berlin
- Known for: Alternatives to animal testing
- Awards: EUROTOX Lecture Award (2022); Björn Ekwall Memorial Award (2022); EUROTOX EUROTOX Honorary Membership (2026)
- Scientific career
- Fields: Toxicology
- Doctoral advisor: Monika Schäfer-Korting

Helena Kandarova (Helena Kanďárová) is a Slovak toxicologist and scientific researcher specializing in vitro toxicology, 3D tissue engineering, and alternative methods to animal testing. She is recognized for her contributions to the development and validation of non-animal testing methods used in regulatory toxicology for chemicals, cosmetics, and medical devices.

== Early life and education ==
Helena Kandarova studied at the Slovak University of Technology, Faculty of Chemical and Food Engineering in Bratislava during 1996 - 2001 and completed her doctoral studies at the Freie Universität Berlin (Doctoral advisor Prof. Monika Schäfer-Korting) and ZEBET at the BfR (Doctoral supervisor Dr. Manfred Liebsch) in 2006, where her research focused on the development and validation of in vitro methods using reconstructed human tissue models for toxicological assessment.

== Career ==
Kandarova began her professional career in the biotechnology sector, joining MatTek Corporation, and served as founder and Executive Director of its EU subsidiary between 2009 and 2018. In this role, she coordinated the technology transfer from the USA to the European facility, managed and supervised validation studies. She took an important role in the broad implementation of alternative methods in regulatory toxicology through the training programmes focused on topical toxicity.

Since 2019, Kandarova has been affiliated with the Slovak Academy of Sciences, where she serves as Director and Senior Scientist at the Institute of Experimental Pharmacology and Toxicology within the Centre of Experimental Medicine. Her work at the institute has included the establishment and management of the SK-NETVAL laboratory dedicated to the development and validation of alternative methods, as well as participation in international research projects focused on new approach methodologies and alternatives to animal testing. Kandarova has also held a position at the Institute of Biochemistry and Microbiology at the Faculty of Chemical and Food Technology at the Slovak Technical Universtity in Bratislava between 2020 and 2026, where she was teaching cell and tissue culture engineering.

Kandarová has held leadership and advisory roles in several international scientific organisations, including:

- President of the European Society for Toxicology In Vitro (since 2020)
- Vice-President of the Slovak Toxicology Society
- EASAC Bioscience steering panel
- National coordinator and Member of expert groups of the Organisation for Economic Co-operation and Development (OECD)
- EPAA Mirror Group

== Research and contributions ==
Kandarova's research focuses on developing new approach methodologies, particularly in vitro models using reconstructed human tissues, to replace or reduce animal testing in toxicology. Her work includes:

- Development and validation of 3D human tissue models for skin, eye, and phototoxicity testing
- Integration of alternative methods into OECD and ISO regulatory guidelines
- Risk and safety assessment of chemicals, cosmetics, and medical devices using non-animal approaches

Kandarová has authored or co-authored more than 90 scientific publications in the field of toxicology. Kandarová has contributed to numerous peer-reviewed publications in toxicology. Her work includes validation studies on alternative testing methods and safety evaluation using human tissue models.

== Awards and recognition ==
Kandarova has received several international awards for her contributions to alternative toxicological methods, including:

- Doerenkamp-Zbinden Award (2021)
- EUROTOX Lecture Award (2022)
- Björn Ekwall Memorial Award (2022)
- ESET Science Award Finalist (2023)
- US SOT Award, Medical Device and Combination Products Speciality Section (2025)
- EUROTOX EUROTOX Honorary member (2026)
