= British Industrial Biological Research Association =

UK-based research association

Coordinates: 51°21′38.2″N 0°9′4.66″W

- Type: Private
- Industry: Toxicology testing
- Founded: 1961; 65 years ago
- Headquarters: United Kingdom
- Website: www.bibra-information.co.uk

The British Industrial Biological Research Association or BIBRA is a UK-based industrial research organisation focused on the study of the toxicology of commercial products. Originally established as a British government-backed research association, it has since been reorganised as a wholly private company.

== History ==
BIBRA was formed in 1961 by industry as a not-for-profit, independent collaborative industrial research organisation focused on the field of toxicology. Upon its creation, it did receive support of the Department of Scientific and Industrial Research (DSIR), which initially provided 50 percent of its funding. Despite this connection, BIBRA was not intended to supplement the existing activities performed by DSIR. It was later funded by the Ministry of Agriculture, Fisheries and Food (MAFF); additional funding was provided by industry.

Prior to its establishment, it had been decided that BIBRA would be provisioned with newly-build laboratories in Leatherhead, Surrey, adjacent to the existing laboratories of the British Food Manufacturing Industries Research Association, which permitted the sharing of certain facilities between the two organisations. A further advantage of the location was its close proximity to the Toxicological Research Unit of the Medical Research Council (MRC) at Carshalton. The facility, commonly referred to as the BIBRA Research Laboratories, was delivered at a cost of £56,000 and was primarily dedicated to research into the health effects of various substances used in food manufacture or otherwise may enter the food chain, such as pesticides, packaging materials, or utensils.

BIBRA became heavily involved in investigations into the toxicology of various food products (including additives), pharmaceuticals, and cosmetics. The facility was extended during the late 1960s; Prince Philip, Duke of Edinburgh visited the site on 8 June 1969.

Throughout the 1970s, BIBRA was repeatedly commissioned by MAFF to perform various tests, over a dozen of which involved animal testing. It also worked extensively with the Association of the British Pharmaceutical Industry (ABPI) and the MRC.

=== Restructuring and ownership changes ===
By the late 1980s, BIBRA had been restructured into a private company.

The organisation underwent numerous name changes between the late 1980s and late 2000s; it was rebranded as BIBRA Toxicology International in 1989 before simplifying to BIBRA International in 1994. In August 1999, its research association constitution ceased to be maintained as BIBRA was purchased by the Netherlands-based research organisation TNO. Shortly thereafter, it became TNO BIBRA International. In November 2002, the company was divested by TNO to a private investor as BIBRA International Ltd. In 2007, it was amalgamated with Toxicology Advice & Consulting Ltd to become Bibra toxicology advice & consulting Ltd.

== Function ==
The association produced the international journal Food and Chemical Toxicology and Toxicology in Vitro.

The BIBRA Laboratories have worked with the subjects of -

- Environmental toxicology
- Immunohistochemistry

== Structure ==
Presently, BIBRA is situated on the A237; it was previously further west, on the B278. The former British Industrial Biological Research Association was in northern Surrey.

== See also ==
- British Food Manufacturing Industries Research Association
- British Toxicology Society
- Committee on Toxicity
- Registration, Evaluation, Authorisation and Restriction of Chemicals (REACH)
- Society of Cosmetic Chemists
