= Latarcin =

Identifiers
- Symbol: Latarcin
- Pfam: PF10279
- InterPro: IPR018802
- OPM superfamily: 259
- OPM protein: 2pco
Available protein structures:
- PDB: IPR018802 PF10279 (ECOD; PDBsum)
- AlphaFold: IPR018802; PF10279

Latarcins are short antimicrobial peptides from the venom of the spider Lachesana tarabaevi. Latarcins adopt an amphipathic alpha-helical structure in the plasma membrane. Possible pharmacological applications for latarcins include antimicrobial and anticancer treatments.
