= JCE =

JCE may refer to the following:

In publishing:

- The Journal of Chemical Education
- The Journal of Cardiovascular Electrophysiology, a scientific journal focusing on cardiac arrhythmias
- The Journal of Comparative Economics

In education:

- Jerusalem College of Engineering, an Israeli Academic College for Engineering Studies, bestowing B.Sc. degrees
- Jordanhill College of Education

In computing:

- JWPce file extension
- Java Cryptography Extension defines APIs for several encryption mechanisms
- Joomla Content Editor

Other:

- Journey to the Center of the Earth
- Junior Certificate
- Joint criminal enterprise
- Jackie Chan Emperor, a film production company owned by actor Jackie Chan
