= Ana Catarina Fonseca =

Portuguese neurologist, known for her research into strokes

- Ana Catarina Fonseca in 2021
- Born: 22 April 1981 (age 44); Portugal
- Occupation: Neurologist
- Known for: Research into strokes; precision medicine

Ana Catarina Fonseca is a Portuguese neurologist, researcher and university teacher.

== Training ==
Ana Catarina Gaspar Fonseca was born on 22 April 1981. She obtained a degree in medicine from the NOVA University Lisbon in Portugal between 1998 and 2004, followed by a master's in neurosciences from the Faculty of Medicine of the University of Lisbon (2007-09). She also obtained a master's in stroke medicine from Danube University Krems in Austria, between 2008 and 2011. She studied at the Harvard T.H. Chan School of Public Health, obtaining a master's in Public Health in 2014 and in the same year completed a PhD in medicine, specialising in neurology, from the University of Lisbon.

== Career ==
Fonseca has been a research fellow at the John Radcliffe Hospital in Oxford, United Kingdom and at the Sainte-Anne Hospital Centre in Paris. She was a resident in the Hospital de Santa Maria in Lisbon and in 2012 became the staff neurologist in the stroke unit at the same hospital. She is a researcher at the Instituto de Medicina Molecular where she manages the stroke biobank collection. She teaches pharmacology and neurology at the University of Lisbon. From 2017 to 2019 Fonseca was vice-president of the Portuguese Neurological Society and she was a member of the Education Committee of the European Stroke Organization. Her main research interests are cryptogenic stroke, heart-brain interactions (cerebrovascular disease), and precision medicine.

In addition to having herself published extensively, Fonseca is also an ad hoc external reviewer for a wide range of journals, including the Journal of Neurology, Neurosurgery, and Psychiatry, Stroke, Circulation, Neurology, European Journal of Neurology, Journal of the Neurological Sciences, Acta Neurologica Scandinavica, Journal of Stroke and Cerebrovascular Diseases, European Neurology, International Journal of Stroke Research, JAMA Neurology, and The Lancet.

== Publications ==
Fonseca has over 50 published works as lead author or co-author. They include:

- Fonseca AC, Merwick A, Dennis M, et al. European Stroke Organisation (ESO) guidelines on management of transient ischaemic attack. European Stroke Journal. 2021
- Fonseca AC, Marto JP, Pimenta D, et al. Undetermined stroke genesis and hidden cardiomyopathies determined by cardiac magnetic resonance. Neurology. 2020
- Fonseca AC, Alves P, Inácio N, Marto JP, Viana-Baptista M, Pinho-E-Melo T, Ferro JM, Almeida AG. Patients with Undetermined Stroke Have Increased Atrial Fibrosis: A Cardiac Magnetic Resonance Imaging Study. Stroke. 2018
- Fonseca AC, Marto JP, Alves PN, et al. Women Who Have Ischemic Strokes Have a Higher Burden of Left Atrial Fibrosis Than Men. Stroke. 2018
- Fonseca AC, Franco AC, Tavares J. Bilateral parotid gland hemorrhage after intravenous thrombolysis for stroke treatment. J Neuro 2017
- Fonseca AC, Ferro JM. Cryptogenic stroke. Eur J Neurol. 2015
- Fonseca AC, Melo TP, Ferro JM. Cotard delusion after stroke. Eur J Neurol 2013
- Fonseca AC, Matias JS, E Melo TP, Pires C, Geraldes R, Canhão P, Brito D, Ferro JM. Time course of NT-proBNP levels after acute ischemic stroke. Acta Neurol Scand 2013
- Fonseca AC, Ferro JM. Drug abuse and stroke. Current Neurology and Neuroscience Reports 2013
- Fonseca AC, Geraldes R, Pires J, Falcão F, Bentes C, Melo TP. Improvement of sleep architecture in the follow up of a patient with bilateral paramedian thalamic stroke. Clin Neurol Neurosurg 2011
- Fonseca AC, Canhao P. Diagnostic difficulties in the classification of transient neurological attacks. Eur J Neurol 2011
- Fonseca AC, Ferreira JJ, Albuquerque L, Ferro JM. Sneeze as a precipitating factor of cerebral venous thrombosis. Eur J Neurol 2007

In addition, Fonseca is co-editor of Precision Medicine in Stroke, published in May 2021, which covers state-of-the-art knowledge in the topic.

== Awards and honours ==
- In 2016, Fonseca was one of three winners of the Medalhas de Honra L'Oréal Portugal para as Mulheres na Ciência (Medals of Honour of L'Oréal Portugal for Women in Science).
