= Aristides M. Tsatsakis =

Greek toxicologist

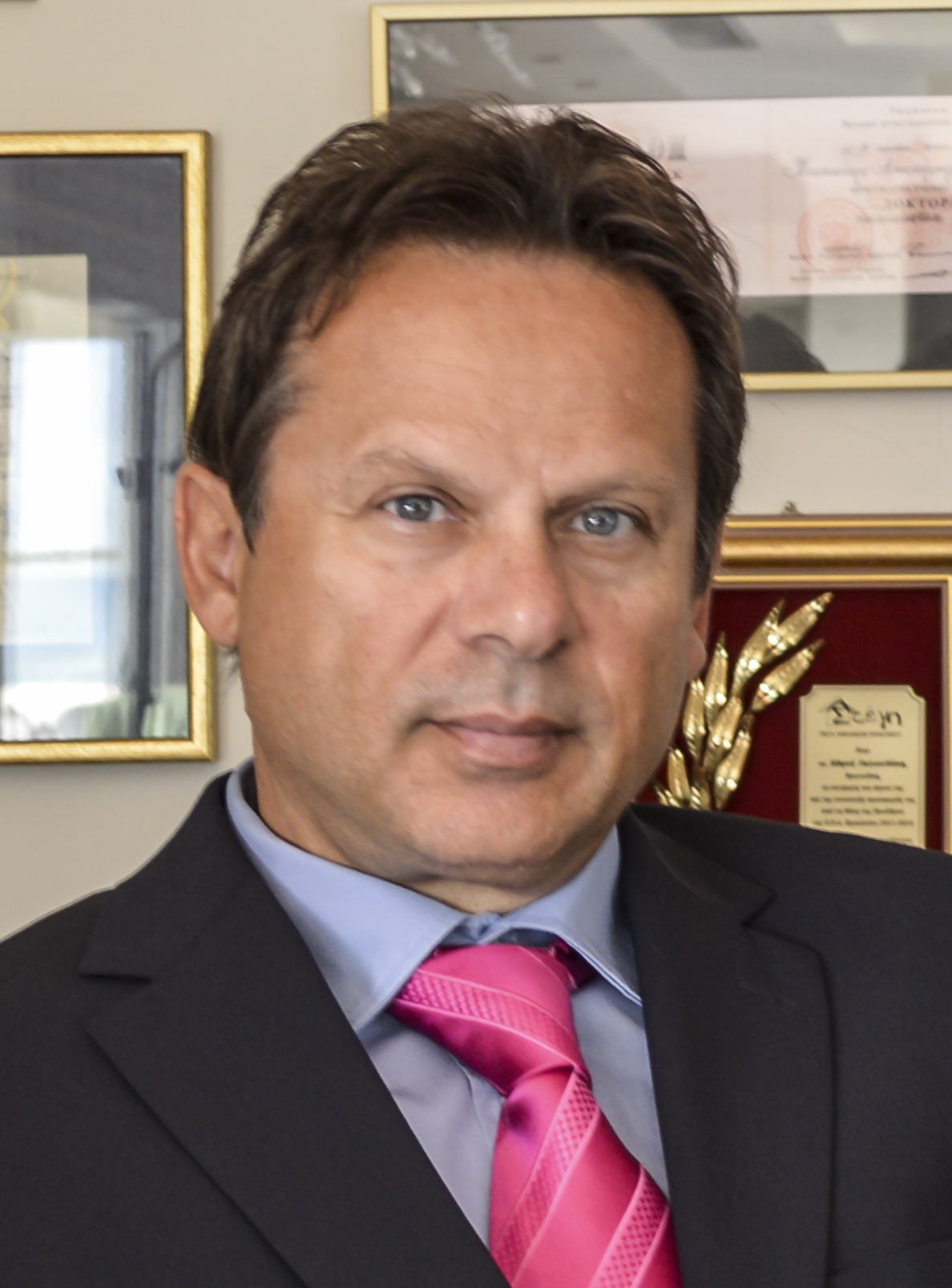
- Scientific career
- Fields: Toxicology
- Workplaces: University of Crete

Aristidis Tsatsakis (Greek: Αριστείδης Τσατσάκης) is a Greek toxicologist. He directs the Laboratory of Forensic Science & Toxicology at the University of Crete. He also founded a commercial spinoff company, ToxPlus SA.

== Research ==
Tsatsakis has published research on hormesis, interpreting “real-life human exposure” scenarios based on a long-term, low-dose exposure to chemical mixtures as well as “real-life risk simulation” studies.

He was an editor or guest editor for journals including Food and Chemical Toxicology, Toxicology, Toxicology Letters, and Experimental and Therapeutic Medicine. He was briefly the editor-in-chief of Toxicology Reports, but stepped down after publishing a special edition on COVID-19 with two papers that were later retracted, including one listing him as co-author.

He is a member of the Russian Academy of Sciences (RAS) and of the World Academy of Sciences.

In October 2023, he served as an expert witness for the defense in the first trial of Roula Pispirigou. His testimony suggested that methodological flaws in the toxicology report resulted in an erroneous determination of the cause of death as a ketamine overdose. Pispirigou was found guilty of causing her daughter's death via overdose, and in a subsequent trial was found guilty of previously murdering her two younger children as well.

In July 2026, Tsatsakis was arrested as part of a sting operation to catch a ring of toxicologists who were bribed to tamper with forensic toxicology tests in eight court cases.

== Selected publications ==
- Tsatsakis et al., 2017, Simulating real-life exposures to uncover possible risks to human health: A proposed consensus for a novel methodological approach. Human & Experimental Toxicology
