= Cellular Physiology and Biochemistry =

- Language: English
- Edited by: Erich Gulbins

Publication details
- History: 1991–present
- Publisher: Cell Physiol Biochem Press (Germany)
- Frequency: Bimonthly
- Impact factor: 5.5 (2018)

Standard abbreviations
- ISO 4: Cell. Physiol. Biochem.

Indexing
- CODEN: CEPBEW
- ISSN: 1015-8987 (print); 1421-9778 (web)

Links
- Journal homepage

Cellular Physiology and Biochemistry is a scientific journal, which since 2019 is published by Cell Physiol Biochem Press, Düsseldorf, Germany. The journal publishes articles from both the physiological and biochemical disciplines as well as related fields such as genetics, molecular biology, pathophysiology, pathobiochemistry, cellular toxicology and pharmacology.

CPB was published by Karger Publishers until the end of 2018.
