= Stephan Zipfel =

German psychotherapist

Stephan Zipfel (born 1962) is a German professor for psychosomatic medicine at the Eberhard Karls Universität Tübingen. He is currently Chair and Head of Department of Internal Medicine VI (Psychosomatic Medicine and Psychotherapy) at the University Medical Hospital in Tübingen and Vice Dean of the Medical Faculty. He specializes in eating disorders and is the Director of the Centre of Excellence for Eating Disorders (KOMET) at the University Hospital.

== Life ==
He trained as specialist in Internal Medicine and Psychosomatic Medicine and Psychotherapy at the University Medical Hospital Heidelberg, Germany, the Royal Free Hospital London, UK, and at the Department of Psychological Medicine, University of Sydney, Australia. He has done his PhD 2002 at the University of Heidelberg.

In 2004 he became Professor for Psychosomatic Medicine at the Eberhard Karls Universität Tübingen and Medical Director of the Department of Psychosomatic Medicine and Psychotherapy. In 2014 he co-founded the Centre of Excellence for Eating Disorders at the University of Tuebingen Tübingen (KOMET). In 2006 he became Vice Dean of the Medical Faculty, in this function he is responsible for the domain Medical Education and International Affairs.

He was President of the German College of Psychosomatic Medicine (DKPM) (2012-2018) and Secretary General of the International Federation of Psychotherapy (IFP). He is also President of the International College of Psychosomatic Medicine (ICPM).

== Research ==
Zipfel’s main research interests are eating and weight related disorders, somatoform disorders and functional somatic disorders, psycho-oncology, refugee mental health and academic medicine. In the ANTOP-study (2004) Zipfel and his colleagues compared cognitive behavioural therapy and best possible standard therapy to a new focal psychodynamic therapy for patients with anorexia nervosa, they had collectively developed.

He is on the advisory or editorial board of several international journals on psychosomatic medicine including Lancet Psychiatry, Psychotherapy and Psychosomatics, Frontiers in Psychiatry (section Psychological Therapy and Psychosomatics), European Eating Disorders Review, Nutrients

=== Awards ===
- 2002: Dres. Graute and Graute-Opperman Research Award
- 2014: Heigl Price for Psychotherapy
- 2017: Barz Research Price

== Publications ==
=== As editor ===
- with Monique C. Pfaltz, Ulrich Schnyder (eds.): Refugee Mental Health. Frontiers in Psychiatry 2019.
- with Stephan Herpertz, Martina de Zwaan (eds.): Handbuch Essstörungen und Adipositas, 3. Aufl. Springer, Berlin 2022.
- with Martina de Zwaan, Stephan Herpertz (eds.): Psychosoziale Aspekte der Adipositaschirurgie. Springer, Berlin 2019.
- with Florian Junne, Jana Denkinger, Jan Ilhan Kizilhan (eds.): Aus der Gewalt des „Islamischen Staates“ nach Baden-Württemberg. Evaluation des Sonderkontingents für besonders schutzbedürftige Frauen und Kinder aus dem Nordirak. Beltz Juventa, Weinheim 2019.

=== As author ===
- with Sandra Becker, Martin Teufel: Psychotherapie der Adipositas: Interdisziplinäre Diagnostik und differenzielle Therapie. Kohlhammer, Stuttgart 2015.
- with Hans-Christoph Friederich, Wolfgang Herzog, Beate Wild, Henning Schauenburg: Anorexia nervosa: Fokale psychodynamische Psychotherapie. Hogrefe, Göttingen 2014.
