= Oxytocin treatment for postpartum depression =

Oxytocin (OT) has potential to be a treatment for postpartum depression (PPD)^{[1]}. Oxytocin is released when a mother cares for her child, making the interaction pleasurable.^{[2]} Mothers that report high levels of infant-mother bonding and demonstrate responsive and sensitive parenting generally show increased levels of OT and brain reward center activation during play sessions^{[1]}. According to Slattery and Neumann, the oxytocin system of mothers experiencing PPD may have altered activity^{[3]}. These mothers have trouble bonding with their infants when they are born^{[1]}. An experiment found that mothers, who have low attachment ratings to adults and their infants, also have lower levels of OT when caring for their children^{[3]}. It is thought that women experiencing PPD may benefit from intranasal OT because this treatment would help the mother feel happier and assist her in bonding with the child ^{[1]}. Another experiment shows that administering OT to a mother sheep increases the amount of care that she gives to offspring ^{[2]}. Further experimentation needs to be done in order to determine the effectiveness of OT as a treatment for postpartum depression^{[3]}.

== Intranasal administration ==
Intranasal (IN) administration, as opposed to more conventional routes, such as oral or intravenous infusion, offers an alternative method for drug delivery. This method is often the preferred method.^{[4]} Oxytocin (OT) is a neuropeptide that can be administered in this manner.

IN delivery methods are gaining popularity due to the non-invasive nature of the method. IN generally does not require complicated sterile preparations, is relatively painless, and often can be administered quickly by a medical doctor, or in some cases the patient. IN maximizes the convenience and comfort of the patient, making a treatment regimen more likely to be followed.^{[4]} During postpartum depression (PPD), some women may be less likely to seek treatment if treatment is inconvenient. In addition, new mothers (especially if suffering with depression) may feel socially isolated or overwhelmed by responsibilities of caring for a new infant. IN not only provides a convenient delivery method, but is also a logical choice based on efficacy. Tissue in nasal cavities is highly vascular, providing a large surface area for absorption. Large surface areas allow for quick drug onset, meaning greater potential for the drug to reach the central nervous system without undergoing first-pass metabolism.^{[4]}

Avoiding first-pass metabolism allows more of the drug to be available for treatment. Gastrointestinal discomfort and digestive side-effects can also be avoided by IN dosage.^{[4]} IN delivery allows OT to cross the blood brain barrier, expediting the drug to the central nervous system^{[5]} and cerebrospinal fluid. The blood-brain-barrier normally protects the brain by blocking certain chemicals and toxins from reaching the brain. Increased levels of OT can be found in salivary samples after intranasal administration of the neuropeptide. Salivary OT levels can remain higher than baseline levels four hours after dosage, suggesting that OT is still producing an active response.^{[5]} This may be an effective way of monitoring levels of OT levels during short-term treatment or help identify women at risk of or have a history of PPD. Though OT can be administered intravenously (and is sometimes the appropriate method depending on the medical situation), IN administration offers many advantages that make it an ideal choice for short-term treatment.

== Side effects ==
A review of 38 randomized and controlled trials suggests that short-term use of intranasal oxytocin appears to have few side-effects, with no difference when compared to a placebo group. Short-term use of intranasal oxytocin (OT) appears to be equally safe in vulnerable individuals as well as those deemed healthy. Three adverse incidents have been reported; two were thought to be caused by actual misuse of the nasal spray and one was linked with a more lengthy treatment regimen. The most frequently reported subjective sensation was calmness; however, there were no detectable differences between groups of OT use and placebo.^{[6]}

Given that postpartum depression (PPD) is not a chronic illness in nature, short-term intranasal OT treatment may be a logical application to alleviate some of the negative consequences associated with PPD. Effects of OT that may be beneficial are reduced levels of anxiety, increased trust levels and increased eye gaze,^{[6]} all which could be beneficial side-effects for women suffering from PPD. Duration of treatment seems to be a key factor in safety. Allergic reactions, neurological disorders, and cardiovascular conditions should always be considered, but especially so if treatment is long-term. OT can modify heart rates and cause excessive fluid intake (antidiuretic effect). Intravenous infusion (IV) of oxytocin is often used to induce labor and enhance milk lactation during postpartum care. IV use can cause side-effects such as cardiovascular manifestations in the form of tachycardia and bradycardia.

In addition, nausea, vomiting, and headaches can occur with IV application. Less frequently, water intoxication, skin rash, and anaphylactoid reactions have been reported.^{[6]}

== Experimentation ==
Intranasal oxytocin (OT) has been used to alleviate some of the symptoms associated with postpartum depression (PPD). Research by McErlean and Dadds suggests that intranasal OT, when combined with behavioral interventions, can remediate some of the mother-infant disturbances associated with PPD. This was the first study to evaluate both the individual effects of OT and the combined effects of OT in conjunction with maternal coaching. The study consisted of seventy-seven mothers (with sub-clinical levels of PPD) with infants ranging from eight to thirty weeks.

In addition to the mother-baby interaction coaching, randomly selected mothers were treated with either 24IU OT or a placebo nasal spray over a period of two sessions; measurements were taken over a course of three time periods. Both questionnaire data and observational data, such as eye contact, positive vocalizations, and interaction quality, were used for evaluation purposes. There were significant interactions between the therapy and the OT in regard to maternal behavior. OT also seemed to benefit those mothers who were not involved with the therapy when compared to those that received the placebo nasal spray.^{[1]} OT has also been linked with lowering the human stress response.^{[3]}

Lowering a stress response in women that are suffering from PPD may be beneficial to the infant-mother bond. Studies have shown that breast-feeding causes levels of plasma OT to increase in women. Experiments designed and performed in the 1980s helped researchers understand the correlation between breastfeeding prior to a stressful event and the decreased stress response observed during the peripartum period. As part of this experiment, lactating women were asked to either breastfeed their infant or hold their infant for a fifteen-minute period approximately thirty minutes before being subjected to a Trier Stress Test (TSST).

During the TSST, women were asked to give an unprepared speech and calculate mental arithmetic in front of an audience. Results indicate that the women that breastfed their infant exhibited less stress during the TSST in comparison to the women that just held their infant.^{[3]} Rising OT levels during breastfeeding may contribute to the lower stress situation.
