= Hormone (disambiguation) =

Hormone or Hormones may refer to:

- Hormone, a chemical that sends messages in a plant or animal
- "Hormone", the NATO reporting name for the Soviet/Russian Kamov Ka-25 military helicopter
- Hormones (film), a 2008 Thai film
- Hormones: The Series, a 2013-2015 Thai television series
- Hormones, a medical journal now named Hormone Research in Paediatrics
