= Antimicrobial Agents and Chemotherapy =

- Discipline: Microbiology
- Language: English
- Edited by: Cesar A. Arias

Publication details
- History: 1972–present
- Publisher: American Society for Microbiology (United States)
- Frequency: Monthly
- Impact factor: 4.1 (2023)

Standard abbreviations
- ISO 4: Antimicrob. Agents Chemother.

Indexing
- CODEN: AMACCQ
- ISSN: 0066-4804 (print); 1098-6596 (web)
- LCCN: 61015169
- OCLC no.: 612438222

Links
- Journal homepage; Online access; Online archive

Antimicrobial Agents and Chemotherapy is a peer-reviewed scientific journal published by the American Society for Microbiology. It covers antimicrobial, antiviral, antifungal, and antiparasitic agents and chemotherapy. The editor-in-chief is Cesar A. Arias (University of Texas Health Science Center at Houston). It was established in 1972 by Gladys Lounsbury Hobby.

== Abstracting and indexing ==
The journal is abstracted and indexed in:

- Agricola
- Biological Abstracts
- BIOSIS Previews
- CAB Abstracts
- Chemical Abstracts Service
- Cambridge Scientific Abstracts
- Current Contents/Life Sciences
- EMBASE
- MEDLINE
- Science Citation Index Expanded

According to the Journal Citation Reports, its 2023 impact factor is 4.1.

== See also ==
- Chemotherapy: International Journal of Experimental and Clinical Chemotherapy
