= International Society of Skin Pharmacology and Physiology =

International Society of Skin Pharmacology and Physiology (ISP) is an international organization founded in Basel in 2003 to provide an interdisciplinary forum for discussion and presentation of advances in skin-related topics. The president is Jürgen Lademann. Its official journal is Skin Pharmacology and Physiology.
