= Cerebrovascular Diseases (journal) =

- Discipline: Cardiology
- Language: English
- Edited by: M.G. Hennerici

Publication details
- History: 1991–present
- Publisher: Karger Publishers
- Frequency: 8/year
- Impact factor: 2.974 (2016)

Standard abbreviations
- ISO 4: Cerebrovasc. Dis.

Indexing
- ISSN: 1015-9770 (print); 1421-9786 (web)
- OCLC no.: 22789090

Links
- Journal homepage

Cerebrovascular Diseases is a peer-reviewed medical journal covering the study of cerebrovascular diseases. It was established in 1991 by Michael G. Hennerici and Julien Bogousslavsky, and is published eight times per year by Karger Publishers. Hennerici is the journal's editor-in-chief. According to the Journal Citation Reports, the journal has a 2016 impact factor of 2.974.
