= European Neurology =

- Discipline: Neurology
- Language: English
- Edited by: Julien Bogousslavsky

Publication details
- Former name(s): Monatsschrift für Psychiatrie und Neurologie; Psychiatria et Neurologia
- History: 1968-present
- Publisher: Karger Publishers
- Frequency: Monthly
- Impact factor: 1.356 (2014)

Standard abbreviations
- ISO 4: Eur. Neurol.

Indexing
- CODEN: EUNEAP
- ISSN: 0014-3022 (print); 1421-9913 (web)
- OCLC no.: 1568463

Links
- Journal homepage

European Neurology is a monthly peer-reviewed medical journal covering the field of neurology. Established in 1968, it is published by Karger Publishers. The editor-in-chief is Julien Bogousslavsky. According to the Journal Citation Reports, the journal has an impact factor of 1.356 as of 2014.

== History ==
The history of European Neurology dates back to 1897, when the Monatsschrift für Psychiatrie und Neurologie was established. This journal changed its name to Psychiatria et Neurologia in 1957. In 1968, it was split into two journals: European Neurology and Psychiatria Clinica.
