= Zhang Jin (physical chemist) =

Chinese physical chemist

- 张锦
- Born: December 1969 (age 56); Tongxin County, Ningxia, China
- Education: Lanzhou University; University of Leeds
- Scientific career
- Fields: Physical chemistry
- Workplaces: College of Chemistry and Molecular Engineering, Peking University; National Center for Nanoscience and Technology
- Doctoral advisor: Liu Zhongfan

Chinese name
- Traditional Chinese: 張錦
- Simplified Chinese: 张锦
Transcriptions
Standard Mandarin
- Hanyu Pinyin: Zhāng Jǐn

Zhang Jin (Chinese: 张锦; born December 1969) is a Chinese physical chemist and nanotechnologist. He serves as Professor and Deputy Dean at the College of Chemistry and Molecular Engineering, Peking University, and as Deputy Director of the National Center for Nanoscience and Technology.

== Biography ==
Zhang was born in Wangjiayuan Township of Tongxin County, Ningxia in December 1969. He has an elder brother. He received his bachelor's and master's degrees from Lanzhou University in 1992 and 1995, respectively. He completed his doctoral work in 1998 there under the supervision of Liu Zhongfan. He conducted postdoctoral research at the University of Leeds from 1998 to 2000.

In 2000 he joined the College of Chemistry and Molecular Engineering, Peking University, becoming professor in 2006 and deputy dean in 2015. In October 2018 he was appointed deputy director of the National Center for Nanoscience and Technology.

== Honours and awards ==
- 2001 Outstanding Young Chemist Award of Chinese Chemistry Society (CCS)
- 2005 New Century Excellent Talents in Universities of Ministry of Education
- 2007 Natural Science of Sci-Tech Achievements in Universities (First Class; second contributor)
- 2007 National Natural Science Funds for Distinguished Young Scholar
- 2008 State Natural Science Award (Second Class; second contributor)
- 2011 Supervisor of National Excellent Doctoral Dissertation
- 2013 Cheung Kong Professorship
- 2015 Fellow of the Royal Society of Chemistry (RSC)
- 2017 State Natural Science Award (Second Class)
- November 22, 2019 Member of the Chinese Academy of Sciences (CAS)
