= British Food Manufacturing Industries Research Association =

- Industry: Food testing
- Founded: 12 April 1946; 80 years ago
- Defunct: 16 April 2016
- Headquarters: United Kingdom

The British Food Manufacturing Industries Research Association was a UK-based industrial research organisation focused on the study of food products. It was originally established as a British government-backed research association, but was reorganised in the 1990s as the limited company Leatherhead International.

== History ==
The British Food Manufacturing Industries Research Association was established in April 1946 through the merger of the British Association of Research for the Cocoa, Chocolate, Sugar Confectionary and Jam Trades with the British Food Manufacturers Research Association. Throughout much of its existence, its primary research facilities were based at Leatherhead, Surrey. These laboratories were equipped to perform various types of investigations, including those of a chemical, physical, technological and bacteriological nature. Specific research projects conducted during the 1950s included the breeding and development of new fruit varieties, the drying of confectionary, procedures for pasteurisation, new instruments for measuring rheology, and addressing problems related to food spoilage (specific efforts included the prospective improvements for the canning of herring and vacuum packinging of bacon). The association also maintained an extensive research library, which was available to its subscribing members, which also received reports on its projects on a monthly basis.

Prior to the establishment of the British Industrial Biological Research Association in 1961, it had been decided to base this new association in newly-build laboratories that were adjacent to the association's own pre-existing laboratories in Leatherhead, which permitted the sharing of certain facilities between the two organisations. A further advantage of the location was its close proximity to the Toxicological Research Unit of the Medical Research Council (MRC) at Carshalton. The facility, commonly referred to as the BIBRA Research Laboratories, was delivered at a cost of £56,000 and was primarily dedicated to research into the health effects of various substances used in food manufacture or otherwise may enter the food chain, such as pesticides, packaging materials, or utensils.

During the 1960s, an increasing focus was placed on performing contract research on behalf of public authorities in Britain and elsewhere. Amongst its customers was the United States Department of Agriculture, which contracted the association to research cotton-seed oil and meat. Research projects undertaken during the mid 1960s included new uses for meat and fish in confectionery, ready-made icing, and edible oils suitable for food manufacturing, and control methods for handling bacterial contamination. It often worked closely with the Meat Research Institute. By the mid 1960s, the association employed 87 staff and had almost 700 subscribing members, which collectively contributed almost £100,000 annually to the association; furthermore, additional funding of roughly £45,000 annually was provided by the British Government via the Ministry of Technology.

During 1966, disputes over the association's management and future became public following the resignation of both Dr C. L. Cutting, its director of research, and Dr D. H. Martin, its secretary. Various subcommittees were responsible for assessing expenditure at this time, which was speculated to restrict the director's ability to lead its research programmes. A team of management consultants from Urwick Orr and Partners performed a survey of the organisation around this time.

During the 1990s, the association was restructured into a limited company and was rebranded as Leatherhead International. During the mid-2010s, the organisation entered into administration; in September 2015, it was purchased by the Science Group in exchange for £1.6 million. Two months later, the organisation, which up to that point had employed 150 staff in Leatherhead, closed its presence there and relocated to Great Burgh, Epsom.
