= Oskar Lassar =

German dermatologist (1849–1907)

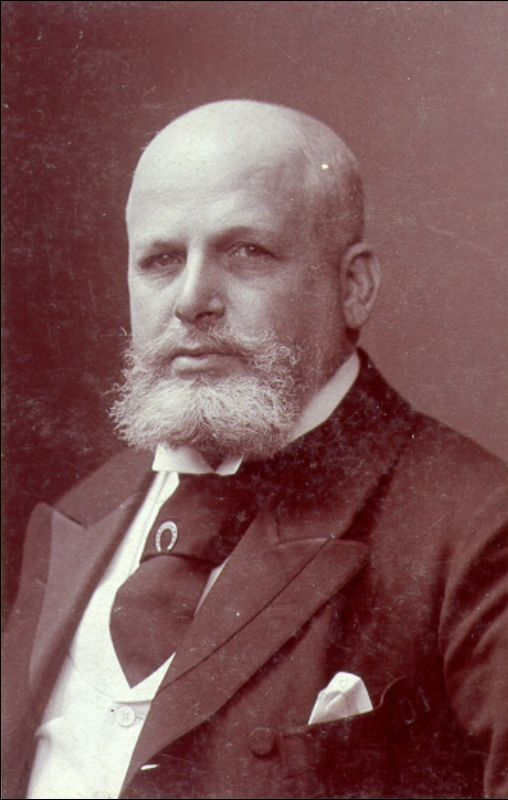
- Oskar Lassar (1849-1907)

Signature
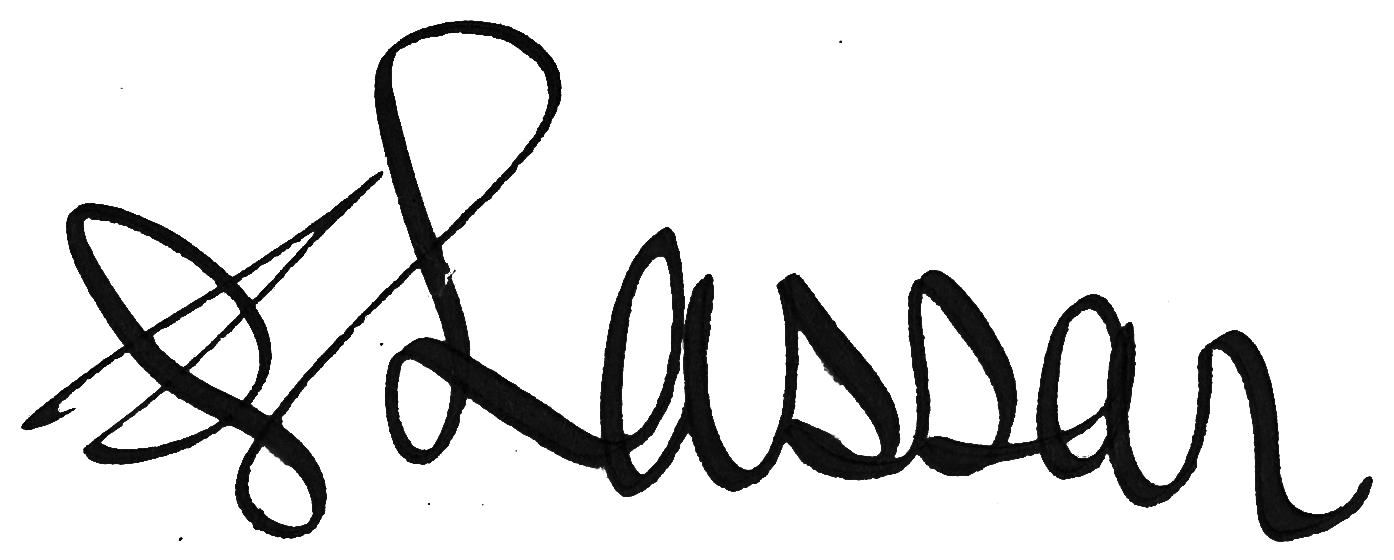

Oskar Lassar (11 January 1849 – 21 December 1907) was a German dermatologist who was a native of Hamburg.

After earning his medical doctorate in 1872, he worked briefly as a hospital assistant at the Berlin Charité. He later started a private hospital for dermatology and syphilis in Berlin. His clinic was known for being technologically advanced, and it was the first to have a Finsen ultraviolet light therapy device and X-ray machine. In 1902 he became a professor at the University of Berlin.

Lassar is remembered for the creation of public bath houses for low-income individuals in Germany and Austria. These bath houses were constructed in the interest of public hygiene, at a time when poorer people didn't have private baths or showers. In Germany, the bath-houses were called Volksbad, and in Austria- Tröpferlbad. In 1899, Lassar was founder of the German Society for Volksbädern. One of his slogans was "a weekly bath for every German."

He was very social, and he invited physicians who made referrals to his clinic to a champagne breakfast twice a year.

Lassar was among the first physicians in Europe to employ X-ray technology for therapeutic purposes. Also, he developed a zinc paste for treatment of eczema, an ointment that is still used today and known as "Lassar's paste". Until the introduction of steroid ointments, this paste was the most widely used topical medication for all kind of skin diseases. In addition, Lassar was the first to assemble a collection of moulage (model injuries for training purposes) in Germany.

He was founder of the dermatology journal Dermatologische Zeitschrift and was its editor from 1893 until his death in 1907.

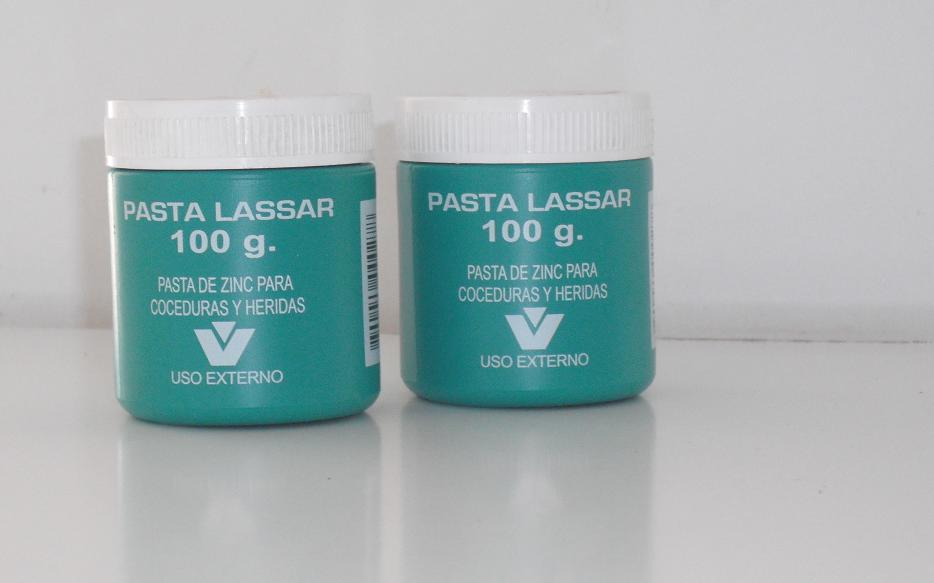
A couple jars of Lassar's paste (Spanish lettering)

== Selected writings ==
- Volksgesundheit und menschliche Gesellschaft in ihren Wechselbeziehungen (Public health and human society) (1892)
- Die gesundheitsschädliche Tragweite der Prostitution (in German), A. Hirschwald, 1892, OCLC 249916016 (Health consequences concerning prostitution)
- Geschichten und Gedichte für kleine Kinder (Stories and poems for small children) (1895)
- Das Volksbad (in German), Berlin, 1896, OCLC 249916424 (The "people" bath)
- Ueber häusliche Gesundheitspflege (in German), A. Hirschwald, 1901, OCLC 249914689 (About home healthcare)
