= Wim van den Brink =

Dutch psychiatrist and academic

- Born: 16 April 1952 (age 73); Hilversum, the Netherlands
- Education: M.D. VU University Amsterdam, PhD University of Groningen
- Known for: Neurobiology and treatment of addiction
- Awards: Marie Curie Award
- Scientific career
- Fields: Psychiatry and addiction
- Institutions: Academic Medical Center, University of Amsterdam

Wim van den Brink (born 1952) is emeritus Professor of Psychiatry and Addiction at the Academic Medical Center, University of Amsterdam. He was Director of the Amsterdam Institute for Addiction Research (AIAR) and Scientific Director of the National Committee for Treatment of Heroin Addiction (CCBH) in Utrecht, the Netherlands.

He was the Chair of the Scientific Programme Committee of 26th, 27th, and 28th ECNP Congress, Europe's largest meeting in applied and translational neuroscience.

== Career ==
=== Research focus/interests ===
Dr. van den Brink is one of the world's established experts on the neurobiology and the pharmacological treatment of addiction. His work explores not only the neurobiological research and treatment development of addiction but also the implementation of treatments at the health-services level.

=== Notable contributions to research ===
Van den Brink is recognized as one of the first to test and implement heroin-assisted treatment (HAT) and deep brain stimulation (DBS) in heroin dependent patients.

=== Awards ===
Van den Brink has won the following awards for his work:

- Marie Curie Award for neuroimaging of the neurotoxicity of ecstasy (2003),
- Science Award of the Netherlands Psychiatric Association (2005)
- Publication Award of the Netherlands Journal of Psychiatry (2008)
- Pieter Baan Lecture Lifetime Scientific Achievement Award of the Netherlands Psychiatric Association (2014)
- Honorable Member Spanish Association of Dual Disorders (2015)
- European Addiction Research Award by European Federation of Addiction Societies (2017)
- Doctor et Professor Honoris Causa Eötvös Loránd University, Budapest, Hungary (2020)

=== Present and previous Appointments ===
Dr. van den Brink was Professor of Psychiatry and Addiction at the Academic Medical Center at the University of Amsterdam. He was also Director of the Amsterdam Institute for Addiction Research (AIAR) and Scientific Director of the National Committee for Treatment of Heroin Addiction (CCBH) in Utrecht, the Netherlands.

Van den Brink was an Assistant Professor of Psychiatry and Addiction at the Academic Medical Center Groningen, the Netherlands, where he was also a senior researcher and a psychiatric resident. He also completed a fellowship in Psychiatric Epidemiology at Columbia University in New York.

=== Positions of trust and research assessments ===
Dr. van den Brink was the Chair of the Scientific Programme Committee of 26th, 27th, and 28th ECNP Congress. He has been a member of the European College of Neuropsychopharmacology (ECNP) since 2003 and on the Executive Committee since 2010.

Van den Brink is a member of the Scientific Advisory Board of the Swiss Research Institute of Public Health and Addiction. He is a member of the International Advisory Board of the European Graduate School in Addiction Research. He is one of the founders and the President of the International Collaboration on ADHD and Substance Abuse (ICASA).

He is a member of many editorial boards, including Sucht, Addiction Biology, International Journal of Methods in Psychiatric Research, and Mind and Brain. He is editor of European Addiction Research. He is on the Editorial Advisory Board of Current Drug Abuse Reviews as well as the Methodological Advisor for the Netherlands Journal of Psychiatry.

=== Publications ===
Van den Brink has published extensively, (co)authoring over 600 peer-reviewed articles.
