= Monique Adolphe =

French cell biologist (1932–2022)

- Born: 23 July 1932; Paris, France
- Died: 27 June 2022 (aged 89); Paris, France
- Education: University of Paris
- Known for: Cell culture techniques
- Scientific career
- Fields: Cellular biology
- Workplaces: École pratique des hautes études

Monique Adolphe (23 July 1932 – 27 June 2022) was a French scientist and researcher into the field of cell biology. She was one of the pioneers of cell culture in vitro and its applications in alternatives to animal testing. She was an Officier de la Légion d'honneur and received several other important decorations and distinctions (see below).

== Biography ==
Monique Adolphe was born in Paris on 23 July 1932. After her pharmacological internship at the Hôtel-Dieu de Paris under Jean Cheymol's supervision in the 1950s, Monique Adolphe orientated, in 1960, her researches in the field of cell culture. With Paul Lechat she was an ardent advocate of alternative methods to animal testing by promoting the use of in vitro techniques, while recognising the limits of these methods.

Much of her research career was devoted to the study of cartilage and chondrocyte biology. As Research Director of the Laboratory of Cellular Pharmacology of the École pratique des hautes études until 1997, she trained dozens of young scientists in cell culture methods. In 1986 she founded the Société de pharmaco-toxicologie cellulaire ("Society of Cellular Pharmaco-Toxicology") (SPTC).

From 1990 to 1994, she was president of the École pratique des hautes études. On 7 January 2009 she became Chair of the Académie Nationale de Pharmacie ("National Academy of Pharmacy") for one year—the first woman to hold this position since the Academy was created in 1803.

Adolphe died in Paris on 27 June 2022, at the age of 89.

== Honours ==
- Member of the Académie Nationale de Médecine (elected 2001)
- Honorary member of the National Academy of Pharmacy (elected in 1984, Honorary since 2002); Vice-President since March 2008; Chair since January 2009
- Honorary member of the European Society of Toxicology In Vitro
- Foreign honorary member of the Académie royale de médecine de Belgique
- Honorary President of the Society of cellular pharmaco-toxicology
- Honorary President of the European Society of tissue culture
- Officier de la Legion of Honour
- Commander of the Order of Merit
- Commandeur des Palmes Académiques

== Bibliography ==
- Pharmacologie moléculaire, Yves Cohen with Monique Adolphe (et al.), ed. Masson, 1978.
- Advances in Physiological Sciences, Vol. 10: Chemotherapy, Monique Adolphe, Publisher: Franklin Book Company, Inc, 1979. ISBN 0-08-023214-0.
- Culture de cellules animales, Monique Adolphe and Georgia Barlovatz-Meimon, ed. INSERM, 1987.
- Méthodes in vitro en pharmaco-toxicologie, Monique Adolphe and André Guillouzo, ed. INSERM, 1988, ISBN 2-85598-350-9.
- Biological Regulations of the Chondrocytes, Monique Adolphe, Publisher: CRC Pr Llc, 1992. ISBN 0-8493-6733-6.
- Culture de cellules animales, Georgia Barlovatz-Meimon and Monique Adolphe, ed. INSERM, 2003. ISBN 2-85598-753-9.
