= Patras sisters death case =

Triple child homicide

The case of the death of three sisters from Patras, also known as the "Roula Pispirigou case" from the mother's name, is a high-profile Greek police and judicial case that came to light in February 2022, when the Patras prosecutor's office asked the police to conduct a preliminary investigation into the case of three siblings who died in unclear circumstances in Patras over a period of three years.

The case attracted intense public interest, and when the children's mother, Roula Pispirigou, was arrested by the authorities as a suspect in their deaths, a crowd gathered outside the family's home, which was vandalized, and threatened to lynch her relatives who were inside. In a sign of the crowd's anger, Pispirigou was taken to court to testify under heavy police protection, wearing a hood and a bullet-proof vest.

The police investigation began following the death of the third child of the family of Manos Daskalakis and Roula Pispirigou, 9-year-old Georgina, on 29 January 2022, and after the Patras Prosecutor's Office issued an order for a police investigation into the deaths. The case was eventually taken over by the "Subdivision of Property Crimes and Crimes Against Life" of the Greek Police. Toxicological tests carried out after the body was exhumed showed an excessive amount of ketamine in Georgina's blood and led to the arrest of her mother as the person responsible for administering the drug. Immediately after her arrest, the deaths of her other two children were investigated, with forensic and histological examinations carried out again. The conclusion of the experts, published on 20 June 2022, indicated foul play - death by suffocation for the other two girls.

Georgina's trial lasted 14 months, with 89 sessions and around 60 witnesses. It ended on 30 March 2024 when the Athens Mixed Jury Court unanimously found her guilty of manslaughter and sentenced her to life imprisonment. The trial of the other two girls (Malena and Iris) lasted about 12 months, with 80 sessions and 50 witnesses. In this case too, the court unanimously found her guilty of the two murders she caused by suffocating them by blocking the air ducts. She was sentenced to two life sentences.

The defendant maintained her innocence to the end and refused to claim any mitigating circumstances. Both verdicts will be reviewed by the Court of Appeal.

An important consequence of the trial was the investigation ordered by the Athens Prosecutor's Office into the state forensic experts who claimed that all three girls died of pathological causes. The prosecutor accused them of perjury.

== The case ==
The mother, Roula Pispirigou (born August 5, 1989), was born and raised in Patras. She studied nursing but did not complete her degree. She was involved in amateur football as a referee, and it was during this time that she met her husband, Manos Daskalakis (born September 21, 1991), the father of their three daughters. Daskalakis was a goalkeeper in the local Achaea Football Clubs Association league. The couple married on October 4, 2014. Their wedding was a notable event in Patras, even earning a full-page feature in the local newspaper Gnomi (“Opinion”), as Daskalakis was a well-known goalkeeper for the Roitika football club at the time. Alongside the wedding, they also baptized their first daughter, Georgina, who had been born nearly a year earlier, on October 31, 2013.

On August 5, 2015, the couple's second child, Malena, was born. In early April 2019, Malena was diagnosed with lymphadenitis and was referred to the Oncology Clinic at the Panagiotis & Aglaia Kyriakou General Children's Hospital in Athens. There, she was diagnosed with acute lymphoblastic leukemia and began chemotherapy. Despite an initially favorable prognosis, the 3.5-year-old girl died suddenly on April 13, just one day after starting treatment. According to the coroner’s report, the cause of death was liver failure. The death of Malena deepened the crisis in the couple’s marriage, a rift that had begun around 2018 when Manos Daskalakis’ extramarital affair came to light. Despite their increasing estrangement, Roula Pispirigou became pregnant again, claiming it was largely because Georgina, their eldest daughter, insisted on having a baby brother.

In September 2020, their third daughter, Iris, was born. However, the arrival of the new child did not mend their relationship. Instead, Roula had a one-night stand with a family friend, while Daskalakis had another extramarital affair.

When Daskalakis discovered this, he decided to end the marriage. On March 21, 2021, six-month-old Iris was found dead in her crib while sleeping. The official cause of death was listed as pulmonary edema, though the pathological-anatomical findings pointed to sinus node dysfunction.

=== Georgina's illness and death ===
Daskalakis informed his wife of his intention to divorce her, and discussions began with a lawyer to pursue an amicable separation. However, Georgina's sudden illness and worsening condition delayed any further steps. On April 8—the day scheduled for the couple's meeting at the lawyer's office to finalize the divorce—Georgina was urgently taken by her mother to Karamandaneio Hospital in Patras. She had been trembling since early that morning and was suffering from severe pain in her back and abdomen. Doctors could not identify any specific pathology, but they admitted her to the pediatric clinic after she suddenly vomited. Tests were conducted over the next few days, and the results consistently came back normal. On April 11, however, Georgina suffered a cardiac arrest. After nearly an hour of effort (55 minutes), doctors successfully revived her.

She was intubated and transferred to the Intensive Care Unit of the Pediatric Clinic at the University Hospital of Rio in Patras. There, she was diagnosed with encephalopathy caused by prolonged brain anoxia due to CPR, resulting in quadriplegia and a severely compromised condition. (Note: Pispirigou's lawyer stated that the scientific threshold for resuscitation efforts is 20 minutes. "He continued resuscitation beyond the permitted limit, leading to a child with developmental delays and quadriplegia. This constituted an illegal act.") In May 2021, Georgina was transferred to the intensive care unit of the Onassio Cardiac Surgery Centre in Athens for an evaluation of her heart function. At the same time, due to two prior sudden deaths previously described as such, genetic testing was conducted on her parents to investigate potential hereditary conditions. During her stay, she experienced another episode of convulsions of unknown origin, accompanied by a fever. No cardiac issues were identified, and the genetic tests for hereditary heart disease came back negative. At the parents' request, the child was fitted with an implantable cardioverter-defibrillator, and on June 6, 2021, she was transferred back to the hospital in Rio.

Since her discharge on July 19, 2021, Georgina has been at home, attending a rehabilitation center and a creative activity center. (Note: The Centers of Creative Activities for Children (KDAP) are Greek educational institutions, where children aged 5-12 spend their time creatively, for a specific period of the day, outside of school hours.)

On January 19, 2022, she was readmitted to the pediatric clinic in Rio following another episode of convulsions, this time accompanied by vomiting. The seizures became almost daily, prompting the decision to transfer Georgina from the ICU to the Children's Hospital of Athens, where she was admitted on January 26. On January 29, she suffered a severe episode of apnea, was admitted to the intensive care unit, intubated, and subsequently died.

== Arrest - Indictment ==
On February 9, 2022, just a few days after the death of Georgina, the Patras Prosecutor's Office ordered a preliminary investigation into the manner and causes of death of the three siblings, aiming to determine whether the deaths were due to pathological reasons or not. The Hellenic Police (ELAS), in collaboration with the competent prosecutors, decided to prioritize Georgina's case and not wait for a unified case file to be compiled for all three girls. The testimonies collected included only the medical and nursing staff who had come into contact with Georgina, while the child's family and friends did not provide statements. When, on March 24, the results of the toxicological tests revealed the presence of ketamine in the child's blood at a concentration of 6.5 mg per liter of blood, and after it was confirmed that this drug had not been administered by the doctors during Georgina's intubation, the police proceeded to arrest the mother on March 30, 2022, on the charge of intentional homicide. During her testimony before the investigating judge Pispirigou claimed that her daughter's death was due to a medical error, attributing responsibility for the lethal dose of ketamine to the doctors who performed resuscitation on the child on the afternoon of January 29, 2022, when she died. In October, after the investigation was completed, the judges of the Judicial Council of the First Instance Court referred the case to the Athens Mixed Jury Court, charging Roula Pispirigou with two felonies: intentional homicide and attempted homicide, with the victim being her own child, specifically her firstborn daughter, Georgina.

On April 4, 2022, the Athens First Instance Public prosecutor's office ordered an urgent preliminary investigation into the circumstances surrounding the deaths of the other two girls. The prosecutor even appointed an informal committee of experts, led by forensic pathologists Karakoukis and Kalogrias, to re-examine the findings of the forensic examinations of the two girls. On July 1, the two forensic pathologists concluded that both Malena's and Iris's deaths were the result of criminal acts, specifically "asphyxiation by obstruction of the external openings of the airways"—Malena's with a hand and Iris's with a cloth. Subsequently, a criminal prosecution was filed against Pispirigou for serial homicides, and its investigation was assigned to an examining magistrate. In August 2022, by a ruling of Judicial Council of the First Instance Court, Pispirigou was referred to trial for the deaths of the other two children as well. In the same month, the criminal lawyer Alexis Kougias took over the legal representation of the accused.

== Trial for Georgina's death ==
=== Prosecution case ===
Roula Pispirigou was referred to trial on two charges -malice aforethought murder and attempted malice aforethought murder- following the verdict of the judges of the Athens Plenary Council. According to the indictment, Pispirigou first attempted to kill her child Georgina- in April 2021 by administering an overdose of a central nervous system depressant, with a probability approaching certainty that the substance was ketamine. Ketamine is capable of inducing an arrest with a drop in twitching and zero oxygen saturation. The attempt failed due to the timely intervention of the doctors. The attempt was successfully repeated in January 2022, at a time when the defendant was alone in the hospital room. Regarding the motive, the verdict noted that all the incidents occurred when she was separated from her husband and attributed her actions to her personality, based on the conclusion of the expert appointed during the investigation. She is described as a personality with pathogenic characteristics, such as ideas of grandeur combined with publicity through delinquent acts, deprived of any real emotion, in constant fear of abandonment by her husband and perceiving her children as a narcissistic extension of herself.

Extract from the testimony of Andreas Ιliadis

I sat and studied the mother's videos for many hours. In no way do they show a seizure. It's a child crying. His picture is expected. I asked for a video of the child and there was a picture on the monitor. It showed tachycardia. There are unexplained phenomena. One of the episodes had an elevated troponin. It was 498 and that surprised me. This troponin had a downward trend and went down to zero and within normal limits. I concluded that it seemed to be some kind of heart problem. Oxygen deprivation can cause tachycardia. A hypoxic event causes tachycardia and then bradycardia. I attribute this to lack of oxygen to the heart in a way that I can't explain. At the same time, a doctor saw a dilation of the pupil of the eye. When you take medication, there are substances that dilate the pupil. There are too many suppressive drugs that have this peculiarity. There is ketamine, which typically causes pupil dilation and tachycardia and then bradycardia. Because then the child would come back.

The trial began on 31 January 2023 with the first witness, her then estranged (now divorced) husband, Manos Daskalakis, who was present in support of the prosecution as a victim of the defendant's actions. Manos Daskalakis - argued that although Roula Pispirigou was a very good and devoted mother, the fact that Daskalakis asked her for a divorce led her to use her children and their illnesses as a means of keeping him close to her. The 52 witnesses supporting the prosecution were overwhelmingly doctors and nurses from the hospitals where the victim was treated. The testimony of Andreas Iliadis, Director of the Pediatric intensive care unit at Rio Hospital, was considered the most important of all, as Iliadis was the first to suspect the accused at an unlikely time.

Iliadis, who received Georgina intubated from the Karamandaneio in critical condition, treated her in the intensive care unit for several days, managed to stabilize her condition and finally decannulated her. In his opinion, the child's cardiac arrest was due to respiratory failure (lack of oxygen), as she did not have any cardiac problems - on the contrary, she had a healthy and functioning heart. When he was informed of the events of the two previous deaths, he requested a full genetic screening at the Onassis Heart Centre. Immediately after intubation, Georgina was taken to the pediatric clinic - where she developed episodes lasting about two minutes, with vomiting, convulsions, tachycardia and a drop in oxygen. The girl was admitted to intensive care, where not only did she not have any seizures, but she also appeared to be in good health (given the encephalopathy she had already suffered during the resuscitation process). When she was moved back to a regular bed, the seizures started again. The girl had a total of 9 such episodes between 19 and 26 April, but only when she was in the room with her mother. Iliadis asked the defendant to videotape the episodes so that he could see for himself what was happening. After examining the video, he decided that there were no convulsions, just a child crying. The doctor considered that the child's mother had nursing skills, that the child was fine when the mother was away, and that the mother showed a lack of connection and emotion towards her child and led him to consider a case of Munchausen's by proxy. (Note: Although the defense maintained that the defendant was mentally sound, it requested a psychiatric evaluation to address the syndrome in question and dispel rumors that could sway the jury. The request was denied.)

Another key testimony was that of Nicolas Raikos, Professor of Forensic Medicine and Toxicology, Medical Chemist and Head of the Toxicology Laboratory of the Aristotle University of Thessaloniki, who claimed that the 9-year-old girl died of an overdose of ketamine, which he said had been administered to her while she was still alive, most likely in a single dose and not through the gastrostomy tube, but intravenously or intramuscularly. The witness ruled out the possibility that it was accidentally administered by the doctors during resuscitation, as claimed by the defence, because, he said, the doctors and nurses were qualified intensivists, the ketamine administered was an overdose, and the drugs were completely distinguishable.

The coroner Sotiris Bouzianis even testified that, based on the findings of Raikos, who had no reason to question them, he recorded the cause of death as ketamine poisoning - since his own autopsy - could not determine the cause of death. Regarding the child's heart, the coroner testified that it was weighed before it was put in formalin and weighed 47 grams.

=== Defence case ===
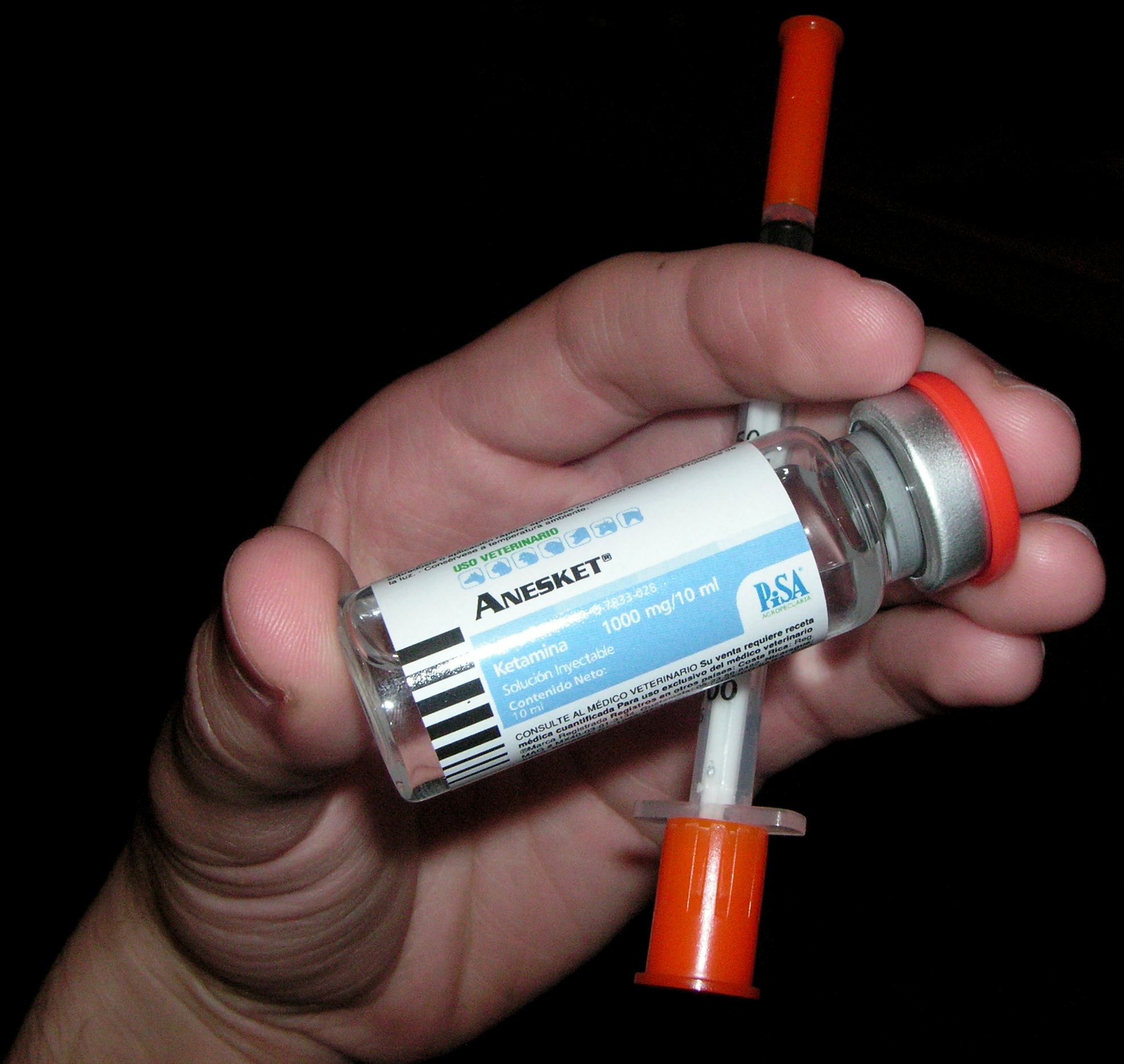
Despite a thorough police investigation to determine the source of the ketamine, a critical piece of evidence, no leads were uncovered. Authorities could neither identify the supplier nor trace any online purchases. Furthermore, it was determined that the ketamine administered to Georgina was pure pharmaceutical-grade, not the illicit substance commonly trafficked on the black market. As ketamine is a controlled substance, the police expected any loss or theft to be reported by a pharmacy or hospital, but no such reports were confirmed.

Twenty witnesses were summoned to testify in the defendant's favor.

All the scientists who provided testimony raised doubts about the cause of death. Forensic expert Christos Kravaritis argued that the girl's death resulted from acute pulmonary edema caused by underlying lung disease and sedative use. He stated that Georgina's life expectancy was inherently very limited. "Her death was inevitable, regardless of other factors. She had a severely damaged brain with gliosis, or scarring, and significant brain degeneration. Her heart, weighing nearly 41 grams, was compromised, and her liver was also impaired. The body was deficient in multiple critical functions."

Forensic expert Ourania Dimakopoulou testified that the cause of death was not ketamine, as the 6.5 ml administered was within therapeutic limits. Instead, she attributed the death to prolonged physical stress on the body. She explained, "The child suffered from epilepsy and an infection. Experiencing fourteen seizures in five days is an immense burden for a child. How much more could her body endure?". She concluded that the cause of death was malnutrition, leading to atrophy of vital organs (heart, lungs, kidneys), compounded by reactive eosinophilia and epilepsy.

Dr. Aristides Tsatsakis, Director of the Laboratory of Forensic Science & Toxicology at the University of Crete Medical School and Heraklion University Hospital, stated that the death was not caused by ketamine. He noted that ketamine is generally a safe drug and is included in European resuscitation protocols alongside midazolam and rocuronium. In his expert opinion, the girl had consumed multiple toxic substances, any of which could have led to fatal poisoning.

One of the trial's most significant testimonies came from immunologist-geneticist Carola Garcia de Vinuesa, renowned for her work on the Kathleen Folbigg case, and her colleague, Professor of Genetic Medicine Todor Arsov. The two scientists argued that there was substantial evidence of a genetic disorder. "The small heart suggests reduced cardiac output, accompanied by fatty infiltration, fibrosis, and the presence of eosinophils, which are rare." Vinuesa highlighted that the pathological findings in Georgina were consistent with those observed in her sisters, Iris and Malena, indicating a potential genetic condition. "These findings are sufficiently unusual and severe to warrant further investigation." Regarding ketamine, she stated, "The ketamine level in the blood was very close to a therapeutic dose. In my professional opinion, it is highly unlikely that ketamine caused the girl's death. She was suffering from other conditions that could have led to her death." She added that a whole genome sequencing could provide critical insights into the case.

=== Verdict ===
On March 29, 2024, following an extended apology from the accused over nine sessions and a 12-hour prosecution speech demanding her guilt, a court of three judges and four jurors unanimously convicted Roula Pispirigou of manslaughter and attempted manslaughter of her firstborn daughter. She was unanimously sentenced to life imprisonment. Additionally, the defense's pending request for comprehensive genetic testing was unanimously denied.

== Trial for Malena's and Iris's deaths ==
On 18 March 2025, Pispirigou was sentenced to two additional life sentences by the mixed jury court in Athens for the murder of her two younger children, Malena (who was undergoing treatment for leaukemia, and who’s death was initially attributed to acute liver failure) and Irida (who’s death was originally attributed to pulmonary edema and a sinus node heart defect). The court accepted the indictment, which argued that Pispirigou caused the asphyxiation death of 3.5-year-old Malena in 2019 and six-month-old Irida in 2021.
