= Monika Schäfer-Korting =

German pharmacologist

- Born: 7 May 1952 (age 74); Gießen, Germany
- Citizenship: German
- Education: Johann Wolfgang Goethe University of Frankfurt am Main
- Scientific career
- Fields: Pharmacology, Toxicology
- Workplaces: Free University of Berlin
- Thesis: (1977)
- Doctoral advisor: Professor Ernst Mutschler

Monika Schäfer-Korting (born 7 May 1952 in Gießen) is a German pharmacologist and toxicologist.

== Life ==
Schäfer-Korting studied Pharmacy at Johann Wolfgang Goethe University of Frankfurt am Main from 1971 to 1975. In 1976, she was approved as a Pharmacist. In 1977 she obtained the degree of a PhD as a pupil of Professor Ernst Mutschler. In 1989 she obtained her post-doctoral degree (Habilitation).

In 1994 she was appointed as the first Professor and Chairperson for Pharmacology at the Faculty of Pharmacy of Free University of Berlin (FU Berlin). Since 2007, as already from 1997 to 1999, she has served as a Vice President for Life Sciences and Research of FU Berlin.

From 2003 to 2008, she was spokesperson for the DFG research group: “Innovative active pharmaceutical ingredients and carrier systems: Integrative optimization for the treatment of inflammatory and hyperproliferative diseases (FG 463)”. She has coordinated the BMBF-Network project: “Validation study for the testing for skin penetration using biotechnologically produced skin models (FKZ 0312881)“.

Schäfer-Korting is a co-author of the text book on pharmacology and toxicology named "Mutschler. Arzneimittelwirkungen (Drug Actions)", whose most recent 8th edition was published in 2001. For Springer Verlag in Heidelberg she serves as the editor of a series of monographs entitled: "Optimized drug therapy", for the ABW Verlag Berlin she edits the series of monographs entitled "The Critical Drug Monograph (TCDM)". She serves as a member of the editorial board of mycoses and Skin Pharmacology and Physiology. She is a member of the board of Gesellschaft für Dermopharmazie (Society for Dermopharmacy) as well as the head of the scientific advisory board of Bundesinstitut für Risikobewertung, Berlin.

The characterization of the benefit to risk ratio of drugs is in the focus of her scientific work. In 1999 Schäfer-Korting published the monograph: “The Benefit/Risk-Ratio: A Handbook of the Rational Use of Potentially Hazardous Drugs“, together with Hans Christian Korting. Topical glucocorticoids with increased benefit to risk ratio such as prednicarbate form a paradigm in the context. Currently, she is particularly interested in signal transduction in various tissues looking for innovative active pharmaceutical ingredients especially for skin disease. Here the focus is on sphingosine-1-phosphate and the corresponding receptor. In terms of developing new drugs the pro-drug concept is of particular relevance. As early as in the stage of developing new active ingredients also the possibilities of creating adequate formulations is considered. With cutaneous drug treatment liposomes and nano-structured lepidic carriers are considered particularly interesting. To reduce the number of animal experiments in the context of toxicologic investigations animal-sparing types of experimentation are developed using skin models.

Monika Schäfer-Korting was married to Hans Christian Korting from 1980 to 2012, when he died.

== Literature ==
- Ernst Mutschler, Gerd Geisslinger, Heyo K. Kroemer, Monika Schäfer-Korting: "Arzneimittelwirkungen. Lehrbuch der Pharmakologie und Toxikologie". 8. Auflage, Wissenschaftliche Verlagsgesellschaft mbH, Stuttgart 2001, ISBN 3-8047-1763-2
- Ernst Mutschler, Gerd Geisslinger, Heyo K. Kroemer, Peter Ruth, Monika Schäfer-Korting: "Arzneimittelwirkungen kompakt. Basiswissen Pharmakologie und Toxikologie". Wissenschaftliche Verlagsgesellschaft mbH, Stuttgart 2005, ISBN 3-8047-2214-8
- Hans C. Korting, M. Schäfer-Korting: "The Benefit/Risk-Ratio: A Handbook for the Rational Use of Potentially Hazardous Drugs". CRC Press, Boca Raton 1999, ISBN 0-8493-2791-1
- Monika Schäfer-Korting, Hans Christian Korting, Ernst Mutschler: "Pharmakokinetik oraler Antimykotika". Schattauer Verlag, Stuttgart 1985, ISBN 3-7945-1050-X
