= Hans Christian Korting =

Hans Christian Korting (March 21, 1952 in Tübingen, Germany – February 25, 2012 in Berlin) was a German dermatologist and medical researcher specializing in causes and treatment of infectious and non-infectious inflammatory skin diseases as well as non-melanoma skin cancer".

Korting graduated with an M.D. from the Johannes Gutenberg University of Mainz in 1977, and subsequently was trained in medical microbiology at central medical services units of the German Army (Bundeswehr) until 1979. Thereupon he was trained as a dermatologist at the Department of Dermatology and Allergology of LMU Munich (Germany).

In 1985, he obtained his post-doctoral degree (Habilitation). He has been working there ever since, lastly as a professor and Executive Academic Director. The focus of his scientific activities was on the characterization of the development of localized fungal infections of the skin and related mucosal surfaces. He concentrated on secreted aspartic proteases of Candida albicans as virulence factors and toll-like receptors as relevant mediators of the inflammatory host response. It was his prime concern to develop active pharmaceutical ingredients for the treatment and prevention of fungal infections reflecting the increased understanding of pathogenesis. In particular, it was intended to address virulence factors rather than structure and function of the pathogen cell wall according to the motto "targeting virulence: a new paradigm for antifungals". Moreover, he was interested in the development of new biological drugs such as plasmin as well as small molecules which are capable of influencing inflammation in the context of signal transduction such as sphingosine-1-phosphate. In addition, there now was a focus on small molecules modulating the function of human polymerase alpha which at a time modulates proliferation of keratinocytes and various viruses including human papilloma viruses (HPV), which is most relevant in the context of non-melanoma skin cancer treatment.

Korting was the recipient of several scientific awards, including the Paul Gerson Unna Prize from the German Dermatological Society as well as the prize for promotion of research of Deutschsprachige Mykologische Gesellschaft. He sat on the board of several scientific societies including Deutsche Dermatologische Gesellschaft (DDG) and was a co-founder of the Society for Dermopharmacy. From 2006 to 2012 he was a member of the board of the Working Group of Scientific Medical Societies in Germany (AWMF). He also edited or co-edited a variety of biomedical journals including Mycoses, The International Journal of Antimicrobial Agents, The American Journal of Clinical Dermatology as well as Hautarzt and JDDG (Journal of the German Society of Dermatology). Prof. Dr. Hans Christian Korting has published 431 scientific papers covered by ISI Web of Knowledge. They have been cited 4.406 times. The book list comprises 20 entries.

Hans Christian Korting was married to Monika Schäfer-Korting.
