= Dan Atar =

German-born cardiologist (born 1959)

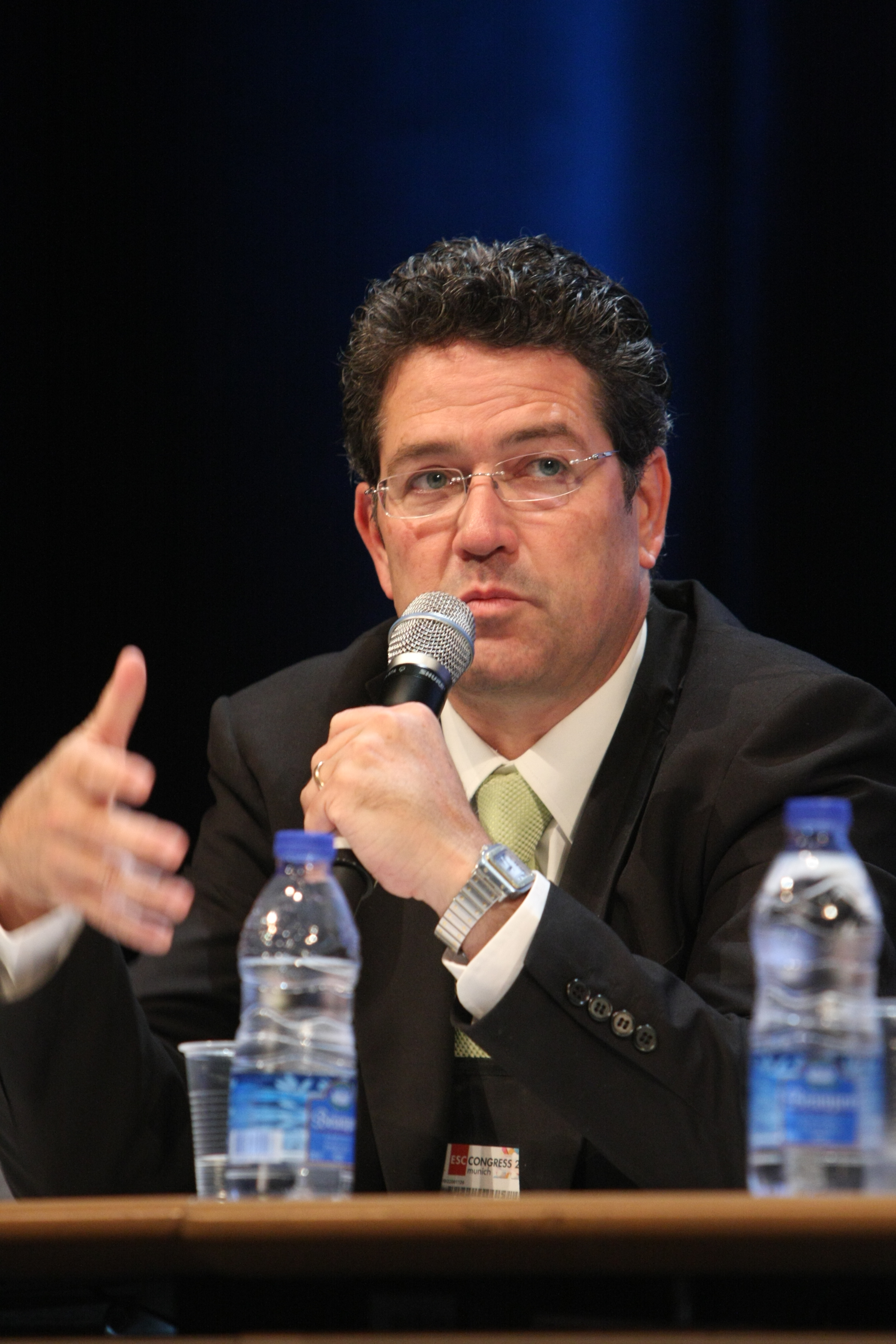
- Atar in 2012
- Born: January 12, 1959 (age 67); Freiburg i.Br, West-Germany
- Occupations: Cardiologist, clinical researcher, professor, teacher
- Spouse: Anna Elisabet Atar Einarsson
- Children: Eva Caroline, Oliver David, Simon August, Viktor Samuel

Dan Atar (born January 12, 1959) is a clinical cardiologist, researcher and professor. He is head of research at Oslo University Hospital, Div. of Medicine, and a full professor at the Institute of Clinical Sciences of the University of Oslo, Norway. He is editor-in-chief of the scientific journal Cardiology.

== Early life and education ==
Dan Atar was born in Freiburg, West-Germany, into a family of medical practitioners. His father, Zeev Atar, being an ophthalmologist and mother, Dalia Atar working as a registered nurse. When he was four years old the family relocated to Basel, Switzerland. He graduated in 1985 with an MD from the medical school at Basel University

== Career ==
Atar completed his postgraduate training at the State University Hospital (Rigshospitalet) of Copenhagen, Denmark under Stig Haunsø, and the Basel University Hospital in Basel, Switzerland under Felix Burkart. Later relocating to Baltimore, he first joined the team under Robert A. Vogel at the University of Maryland Medical Center at Baltimore, studying QCA (Quantitative Coronary Angiography) and continued at Johns Hopkins University in Baltimore, joining the research group of Eduardo Marbán.

Atar received his associate professorship (Privatdozent) at the University of Basel in 1994, and his first junior faculty position at the Department of Cardiology at the Zürich University Hospital, under Thomas F. Lüscher. He then served as senior cardiologist in Copenhagen, Denmark.

In 2002, he received a call to the University of Oslo, Norway, to assume a full professorship in cardiology at Aker University Hospital in Oslo, where he also was appointed head of department. In 2014, Atar was appointed head of research for the Division of Medicine at Oslo University Hospital.

Alongside these positions, Atar engaged in the European Society of Cardiology (ESC). He became chair of the Working Group of Cardiovascular Pharmacotherapy in 2006 and was later elected to a councilor position and board member of the ESC. In 2014–16, he was elected vice-president of the ESC, and in 2018, he was elected as secretary/treasurer of its executive board.

He became editor-in-chief for the peer-reviewed international journal Cardiology (Karger). He served on numerous Executive Steering Committees for worldwide clinical trials, particularly chairing the FIRE-study (published in 2009), the MITOCARE trial (2015), and the BETAMI trial (2018-).

He served for eight years in the board of the Norwegian Society of Cardiology.

Throughout his career, he has practiced as a senior cardiologist, seeing patients both on the ward and in outpatient clinics.

== Personal life ==
On August 13, 1988, Atar married Anne-Mette Kristensen in Copenhagen, Denmark. They had two children. Kristensen died in 2001. On April 8, 2008, Dan married the opera singer Anna Elisabet Einarsson. They have two children.

== Selected publications ==
- Thygesen, Kristian; Alpert, Joseph S.; Jaffe, Allan S.; Simoons, Maarten L.; Chaitman, Bernard R.; White, Harvey D.; Thygesen, Kristian; Alpert, Joseph S.; White, Harvey D.; Jaffe, Allan S.; Katus, Hugo A.; Apple, Fred S.; Lindahl, Bertil; Morrow, David A.; Chaitman, Bernard R.; Clemmensen, Peter M.; Johanson, Per; Hod, Hanoch; Underwood, Richard; Bax, Jeroen J.; Bonow, Robert O.; Pinto, Fausto; Gibbons, Raymond J.; Fox, Keith A.; Atar, Dan; Newby, L. Kristin; Galvani, Marcello; Hamm, Christian W.; Uretsky, Barry F.; Gabriel Steg, Ph; Wijns, William; Bassand, Jean-Pierre; Menasché, Phillippe; Ravkilde, Jan; Ohman, E. Magnus; Antman, Elliott M.; Wallentin, Lars C.; Armstrong, Paul W.; Simoons, Maarten L.; Januzzi, James L.; Nieminen, Markku S.; Gheorghiade, Mihai; Filippatos, Gerasimos; Luepker, Russell V.; Fortmann, Stephen P.; Rosamond, Wayne D.; Levy, Dan; Wood, David; Smith, Sidney C.; Hu, Dayi; Lopez-Sendon, José-Luis; Robertson, Rose Marie; Weaver, Douglas; Tendera, Michal; Bove, Alfred A.; Parkhomenko, Alexander N.; Vasilieva, Elena J.; Mendis, Shanti; Bax, Jeroen J.; Baumgartner, Helmut; Ceconi, Claudio; Dean, Veronica; Deaton, Christi; Fagard, Robert; Funck-Brentano, Christian; Hasdai, David; Hoes, Arno; Kirchhof, Paulus; Knuuti, Juhani; Kolh, Philippe; McDonagh, Theresa; Moulin, Cyril; Popescu, Bogdan A.; Reiner, Željko; Sechtem, Udo; Sirnes, Per Anton; Tendera, Michal; Torbicki, Adam; Vahanian, Alec; Windecker, Stephan; Morais, Joao; Aguiar, Carlos; Almahmeed, Wael; Arnar, David O.; Barili, Fabio; Bloch, Kenneth D.; Bolger, Ann F.; Bøtker, Hans Erik; Bozkurt, Biykem; Bugiardini, Raffaele; Cannon, Christopher; de Lemos, James; Eberli, Franz R.; Escobar, Edgardo; Hlatky, Mark; James, Stefan; Kern, Karl B.; Moliterno, David J.; Mueller, Christian; Neskovic, Aleksandar N.; Pieske, Burkert Mathias; Schulman, Steven P.; Storey, Robert F.; Taubert, Kathryn A.; Vranckx, Pascal; Wagner, Daniel R. (1 October 2012). "Third universal definition of myocardial infarction". European Heart Journal. 33 (20): 2551–2567. doi:10.1093/eurheartj/ehs184. PMID 22922414.
- Granger, Christopher B.; Alexander, John H.; McMurray, John J.V.; Lopes, Renato D.; Hylek, Elaine M.; Hanna, Michael; Al-Khalidi, Hussein R.; Ansell, Jack; Atar, Dan; Avezum, Alvaro; Bahit, M. Cecilia; Diaz, Rafael; Easton, J. Donald; Ezekowitz, Justin A.; Flaker, Greg; Garcia, David; Geraldes, Margarida; Gersh, Bernard J.; Golitsyn, Sergey; Goto, Shinya; Hermosillo, Antonio G.; Hohnloser, Stefan H.; Horowitz, John; Mohan, Puneet; Jansky, Petr; Lewis, Basil S.; Lopez-Sendon, Jose Luis; Pais, Prem; Parkhomenko, Alexander; Verheugt, Freek W.A.; Zhu, Jun; Wallentin, Lars (15 September 2011). "Apixaban versus Warfarin in Patients with Atrial Fibrillation". New England Journal of Medicine. 365 (11): 981–992. doi:10.1056/nejmoa1107039. PMID 21870978. S2CID 43262809.
- Kirchhof, Paulus; Benussi, Stefano; Kotecha, Dipak; Ahlsson, Anders; Atar, Dan; Casadei, Barbara; Castella, Manuel; Diener, Hans-Christoph; Heidbuchel, Hein; Hendriks, Jeroen; Hindricks, Gerhard; Manolis, Antonis S.; Oldgren, Jonas; Popescu, Bogdan Alexandru; Schotten, Ulrich; Van Putte, Bart; Vardas, Panagiotis; Agewall, Stefan; Camm, John; Baron Esquivias, Gonzalo; Budts, Werner; Carerj, Scipione; Casselman, Filip; Coca, Antonio; De Caterina, Raffaele; Deftereos, Spiridon; Dobrev, Dobromir; Ferro, José M.; Filippatos, Gerasimos; Fitzsimons, Donna; Gorenek, Bulent; Guenoun, Maxine; Hohnloser, Stefan H.; Kolh, Philippe; Lip, Gregory Y. H.; Manolis, Athanasios; McMurray, John; Ponikowski, Piotr; Rosenhek, Raphael; Ruschitzka, Frank; Savelieva, Irina; Sharma, Sanjay; Suwalski, Piotr; Tamargo, Juan Luis; Taylor, Clare J.; Van Gelder, Isabelle C.; Voors, Adriaan A.; Windecker, Stephan; Zamorano, Jose Luis; Zeppenfeld, Katja (1 November 2016). "2016 ESC Guidelines for the management of atrial fibrillation developed in collaboration with EACTS". European Journal of Cardio-Thoracic Surgery. 50 (5): e1–e88. doi:10.1093/ejcts/ezw313. PMID 27663299.
- Dickstein, Kenneth; Cohen-Solal, Alain; Filippatos, Gerasimos; McMurray, John J.V.; Ponikowski, Piotr; Poole-Wilson, Philip Alexander; Strömberg, Anna; van Veldhuisen, Dirk J.; Atar, Dan; Hoes, Arno W.; Keren, Andre; Mebazaa, Alexandre; Nieminen, Markku; Priori, Silvia Giuliana; Swedberg, Karl; Vahanian, Alec; Camm, John; De Caterina, Raffaele; Dean, Veronica; Dickstein, Kenneth; Filippatos, Gerasimos; Funck-Brentano, Christian; Hellemans, Irene; Kristensen, Steen Dalby; McGregor, Keith; Sechtem, Udo; Silber, Sigmund; Tendera, Michal; Widimsky, Petr; Zamorano, Jose Luis; Tendera, Michal; Auricchio, Angelo; Bax, Jeroen; Böhm, Michael; Corrà, Ugo; della Bella, Paolo; Elliott, Perry M.; Follath, Ferenc; Gheorghiade, Mihai; Hasin, Yonathan; Hernborg, Anders; Jaarsma, Tiny; Komajda, Michel; Kornowski, Ran; Piepoli, Massimo; Prendergast, Bernard; Tavazzi, Luigi; Vachiery, Jean-Luc; Verheugt, Freek W. A.; Zamorano, Jose Luis; Zannad, Faiez (October 2008). "ESC Guidelines for the diagnosis and treatment of acute and chronic heart failure 2008". European Journal of Heart Failure. 10 (10): 933–989. doi:10.1016/j.ejheart.2008.08.005. hdl:11370/39fe5358-748d-454d-92ba-145e91d23cc9. PMID 18826876. S2CID 70779035.
- Atar, Dan; Arheden, Håkan; Berdeaux, Alain; Bonnet, Jean-Louis; Carlsson, Marcus; Clemmensen, Peter; Cuvier, Valérie; Danchin, Nicolas; Dubois-Randé, Jean-Luc; Engblom, Henrik; Erlinge, David; Firat, Hüseyin; Halvorsen, Sigrun; Hansen, Henrik Steen; Hauke, Wilfried; Heiberg, Einar; Koul, Sasha; Larsen, Alf-Inge; Le Corvoisier, Philippe; Nordrehaug, Jan Erik; Paganelli, Franck; Pruss, Rebecca M.; Rousseau, Hélène; Schaller, Sophie; Sonou, Giles; Tuseth, Vegard; Veys, Julien; Vicaut, Eric; Jensen, Svend Eggert (7 January 2015). "Effect of intravenous TRO40303 as an adjunct to primary percutaneous coronary intervention for acute ST-elevation myocardial infarction: MITOCARE study results". European Heart Journal. 36 (2): 112–119. doi:10.1093/eurheartj/ehu331. PMID 25179768.

=== Awards and honors ===
- In 1992, Dan Atar won the first prize in the scientific competition of the ISHR (International Society of Heart Research, European Section).
- In 1993, he was awarded the scientific prize of the Danish Society of Internal Medicine.
- In 1996, he won the Swiss Cardiology Prize awarded from the Swiss Soc. Of Cardiology.
- In 1996, he was awarded the Foundation Max Cloëtta research award.
- In 1998, he won the Andreas Grüntzig Memorial Scholarship for Interventional Cardiology.
- In 2004, he became a visiting associate professor of medicine at Johns Hopkins University, Baltimore, MD, and he earned a Doctor honoris causa from the Carol Davila University of Medicine and Pharmacy in Bucharest, Romania.
- In 2015, he was awarded the annual Cardiology Prize (Storstein's Prize) by the Norwegian Society of Cardiology.
- In 2023, Dan Atar received the ‘Lifetime Award for Heart Research’ from the Norwegian National Association for Public Health, bestowed by His Majesty King Harald V of Norway.
