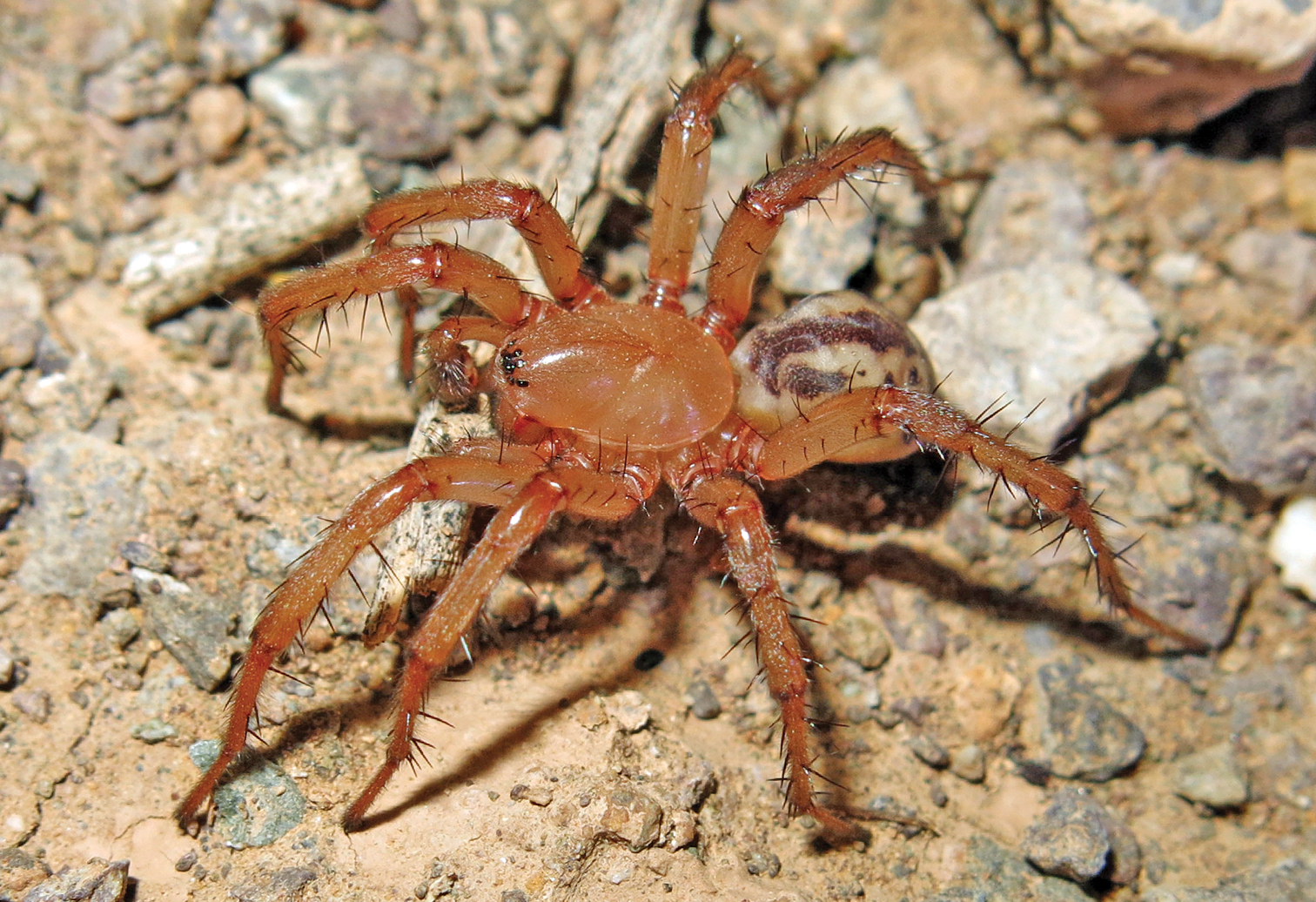

Scientific classification
- Kingdom: Animalia
- Phylum: Arthropoda
- Subphylum: Chelicerata
- Class: Arachnida
- Order: Araneae
- Infraorder: Araneomorphae
- Family: Zodariidae
- Genus: Lachesana; Strand, 1932

Type species
- Lachesana perversa

Species
- 11, see text

= Lachesana =

Genus of spiders

Lachesana is a genus of spiders in the family Zodariidae. It was first described in 1932 by Strand. As of 2022, it contains 11 species.

== Species ==
Lachesana comprises 11 species:

- L. bayramgocmeni Özkütük, Yağmur, Gücel, Shafaie, Özden & Kunt, 2020 — Cyprus
- L. blackwalli (O. Pickard-Cambridge, 1872) — Greece, Cyprus, Turkey, Israel, Lebanon
- L. dyachkovi Fomichev & Marusik, 2019 — Kazakhstan
- L. graeca Thaler & Knoflach, 2004 — Greece
- L. insensibilis Jocqué, 1991 — Israel, Saudi Arabia, Iran
- L. kavirensis Zamani & Marusik, 2021 — Iran
- L. naxos Wunderlich, 2022 — Greece
- L. perseus Zamani & Marusik, 2021 — Iran
- L. perversa (Audouin, 1826) (type) — Egypt, Syria
- L. rufiventris (Simon, 1873) — Israel, Syria
- L. tarabaevi Zonstein & Ovtchinnikov, 1999 — Kyrgyzstan, Uzbekistan, Tajikistan
