= Dermatology (journal) =

- Discipline: Dermatology
- Language: English
- Edited by: G.B.E. Jemec

Publication details
- Former name(s): Dermatologische Zeitschrift, Dermatologica
- History: 1893–present
- Publisher: Karger Publishers
- Frequency: Quarterly
- Impact factor: 3.695 (2019)

Standard abbreviations
- ISO 4: Dermatology (Basel)
- NLM: Dermatology

Indexing
- CODEN: DERAEG
- ISSN: 1018-8665 (print); 1421-9832 (web)
- OCLC no.: 25275441

Links
- Journal homepage; Online access

Dermatology is a peer-reviewed medical journal published by Karger Publishers. It was established in 1893 as the Dermatologische Zeitschrift and was renamed Dermatologica in 1939. It obtained its current name in 1993. The founding editor-in-chief was Oskar Lassar. Other notable editors were Wilhelm Lutz (1939–1958) and Rudolf Schuppli (1959–1985). It was the official journal of the Schweizerische Gesellschaft für Dermatologie und Venere and the Belgian Society for Dermatology and Syphiligraphy. According to the Journal Citation Reports, the journal has a 2019 impact factor of 3.695.
