= European Addiction Research =

- Discipline: Addiction
- Language: English
- Edited by: Karen D. Ersche

Publication details
- History: 1995–present
- Publisher: Karger Publishers (Switzerland)
- Frequency: Bimonthly
- Open access: Subscribe to Open
- Impact factor: 2.8 (2023)

Standard abbreviations
- ISO 4: Eur Addict Res

Indexing
- CODEN: EADREE
- ISSN: 1022-6877 (print); 1421-9891 (web)
- OCLC no.: 44718382

Links
- Journal homepage; Online access

European Addiction Research is a bimonthly peer-reviewed medical journal published by Karger Publishers. It was established in 1995.

== Abstracting and indexing ==
The journal is indexed in, but not limited to,:

- PubMed/MEDLINE
- Scopus
- Web of Science

== Editors-in-Chief ==
Founders: Michael Krausz (1995–2008) and Ambros Uchtenhagen (1995–2006)

Successors:

- Christian Haasen (2008–2010)
- Wim van den Brink (2011–2017)
- Falk Kiefer (2011–2022) and Anneke Goudriaan (2018–2022)
- Karen D. Ersche (2022–present)
