= Cytogenetic and Genome Research =

- Discipline: Cytogenetics, cell biology, genetics, genomics
- Language: English
- Edited by: M. Schmid

Publication details
- Former name(s): Cytogenetics, Cytogenetics and Cell Genetics
- History: 1962–present
- Publisher: Karger Publishers
- Frequency: 16/year
- Impact factor: 1.561 (2014)

Standard abbreviations
- ISO 4: Cytogenet. Genome Res.

Indexing
- CODEN: CGRYAJ
- ISSN: 1424-8581 (print); 1424-859X (web)
- LCCN: 2002260266
- OCLC no.: 1787030

Links
- Journal homepage; Online archive

Cytogenetic and Genome Research is the name of a peer-reviewed scientific journal that was established in 1962. It was published previously under the names Cytogenetics (1962–1972) and Cytogenetics and Cell Genetics (1973–2001).

== Abstracting and indexing ==
The journal is abstracted and indexed in Current Contents/Life Sciences, PubMed/MEDLINE, EMBASE/Excerpta Medica, CAB Abstracts, Scopus, Biological Abstracts, BIOSIS Previews, Journal Citation Reports (Science Edition), Science Citation Index, Science Citation Index Expanded, Web of Science and Zoological Record . According to the Journal Citation Reports, the journal has a 2014 impact factor of 1.561.
