= Trier social stress test =

Procedure used to induce stress in human research participants

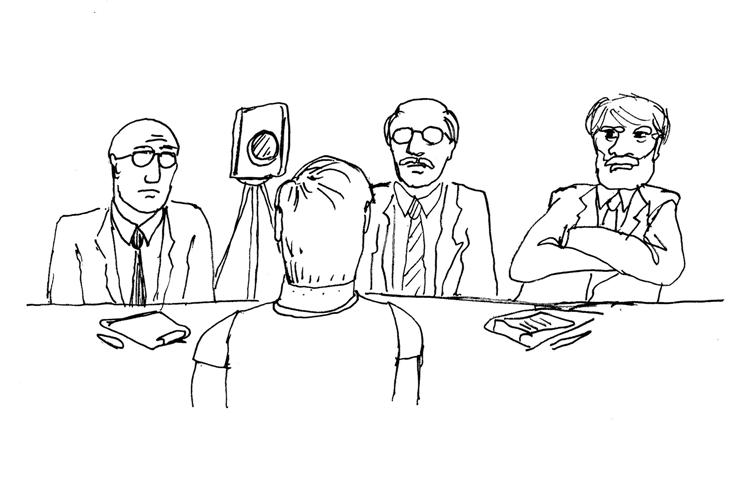
Sketch of the administration of the Trier social stress test

The Trier social stress test (TSST) is a laboratory procedure used to reliably induce stress in human research participants. It is a combination of procedures that were previously known to induce stress, but previous procedures did not do so reliably. It was created in 1993 at the University of Trier by Clemens Kirschbaum and his colleagues.

== History ==
Psychosocial stress is associated with a variety of biomarkers, such as salivary and blood serum cortisol, prolactin, human growth hormone (hGH), adrenocorticotropic hormone (ACTH), and heart rate. Prior to 1993, a number of laboratory tasks were used to elicit these stress markers for research, including the cold pressor test, the Stroop test, public speaking, and others.

These studies encountered two problems: First, there was large interindividual variability in the physiological response to stress, and second, the methods previously used tended to produce effects that were too small to be reliably measured. Consequently, the results from these studies tended to be inconsistent and unreliable.

Clemens Kirschbaum and his colleagues at the University of Trier sought to overcome these limitations by combining different stress-generating tasks in a highly standardized format, which included elements of public speaking, mental arithmetic, and anticipation. They also needed to design a task that would be mild enough to be approved by most human subject protection committees. Their task, which they named the Trier social stress test, consistently produced very large physiological effects in the majority of their participants, thus overcoming the limitations of earlier research. They first reported on the test in 1993, in the journal Neuropsychobiology.

The TSST is widely used as a stress paradigm in stress research. For instance, a systematic review published in 2020 found 1099 distinctive original studies that used the TSST. Also, numerous variants of the test have been developed, including a version for use with children (the TSST-C), a non-stressful placebo version, and a version for use with mentally ill participants. Most research with the TSST has focused on physiological responses to stress, but some researchers are advocating for a closer examination of how the TSST affects psychological responses to stress, and how those responses may correlate with physiological responses.

== Procedure ==
The TSST is designed to exploit the vulnerability of the stress response to socially evaluative situations. While there are different versions of the TSST (the original version, for example, was somewhat longer), most current implementations follow a pattern similar to the following:

The period of induced stress lasts approximately 15 minutes, and is divided into 5-minute components. Before the test begins, the participant is fitted with an IV for collecting blood, and with a heart rate monitor. Stress induction begins with the participant being taken into a room where a panel of three judges are waiting, along with a videocamera and audio recorder.

The first 5-minute component is the anticipatory stress phase, during which the judges ask the participant to prepare a 5-minute presentation. In most studies, this presentation is framed as part of a job interview. The judges have been trained to maintain neutral expressions throughout the test. The participant is allowed to use paper and pen to organize their presentation, but this paper is then unexpectedly taken away from them when it is time to begin the presentation.

During the 5-minute presentation component, the judges observe the participant without comment. If the participant does not use the entire 5 minutes, they will ask him or her to continue. This goes on until the entire 5 minutes have been used.

The presentation is immediately followed by the mental arithmetic component, during which the participant is asked to count backwards from 1,022 in steps of 13. If a mistake is made, then they must start again from the beginning. This component lasts for 5 minutes and is followed by a recovery period.

Immediately after the test is a debriefing, in which the participant is told that the purpose of the test was to create stress, and that the results are in no way a reflection on his or her personal abilities. Saliva and blood samples continue to be collected after the stress induction period has ended.

The procedural steps (e.g., specific time to take cortisol measures) of the TSST have changed since its publication in 1993. A group of researchers conducted the first systematic review of the methodological changes throughout the years and found several inconsistencies. They proposed several guidelines in using the TSST with the intention of standardizing the use of the TSST across studies. For example, they provided information about what exclusion criteria should be considered, the composition of the panel of judges, when and how many physiological measures should be taken (i.e., cortisol, heart rate, blood), and many other aspects of the TSST methodology.

== Indicators ==
The TSST increases levels of several substances known to indicate activation of the hypothalamic-pituitary-adrenal axis (HPAA), a core driver of physiological stress. These include prolactin, hGH, ACTH, and cortisol (both in saliva and blood).

Compared to control, normal healthy individuals undergoing the TSST experience increases over baseline ranging from 30% (prolactin) to 700% (hGH). The timing of these changes also varies by substance. Levels of serum cortisol, prolactin, and ACTH peak immediately after the end of stress induction, but salivary cortisol peaks 10 minutes later and hGH peaks 40 minutes later. These effects were found in more than 70% of the participants.

Heart rate is also an indicator of stress. In normal individuals, heart rate goes from a mean of 70.5 bpm before the test to a maximum mean of 96.5 bpm during the stressful task. Heart rates return to normal quickly after the stress induction has ended.

== Correlations ==
A variety of factors have been found to be correlated with the amount and directionality of response to the TSST. These include sex, nicotine use, genetics, and mental illness, among others.

Males are known to exhibit larger cortisol responses to the TSST. Men typically show double the cortisol response to stress that women show. However, the cortisol responses of females depends on which phase of their menstrual cycle they are in. Women in the luteal phase of the menstrual cycle have cortisol responses that are comparable to men, but the cortisol response of women in their follicular phase is comparable to women taking oral contraceptives.

With regard to nicotine use, chronic nicotine consumption is associated with lower cortisol responses to the TSST than in nonsmokers. It has been suggested that this may be related to the chronic stimulation of CRH-containing neurons in the hypothalamus by nicotine.

There is also evidence that genetic factors contribute to the variability in cortisol response as well. The cortisol response to psychosocial stress is moderate to high. For example, carriers of the Bcll polymorphism have reduced salivary cortisol response to the TSST, while carriers of the N363S polymorphism have enhanced response.

Mental illness exerts a variety of effects on TSST response, depending on the indicator and the illness. Most clinical psychological conditions, including unresolved trauma due to sexual abuse, panic disorder, and excessive experience of early life stress, are associated with blunted response to the TSST, although the lower magnitude of percentage changes may be attributable to baseline inflation caused by a higher average level of everyday stress, such that persons with these conditions experience everyday life as being closer to test conditions than do unaffected persons. Major depression is one of the few conditions associated with a heightened response to the TSST.

== Future directions ==
Most work with the TSST has focused on physiological measures as outcomes. In 2012, Jana Campbell and Ulrike Ehlert conducted a review of 358 existing TSST studies to look at possible associations between emotional stress and physiological indicators. They found a high degree of inconsistency in the subjective measures used by such studies (a variety of Visual Analog Scales were used), and so the results of their analysis were inconclusive. They argue for a greater degree of standardization in the subjective measures used alongside the TSST so that in the future it will be possible to explore this relationship more fully.

Some have also suggested that in the controlled conditions under which the TSST takes place, the emotional response elicited may simply be too weak and variable for it to be consistently correlated with the physiological responses.

TSST is an active stress task; other research employs passive stress tasks.
