= Lachesana tarabaevi =

Scientific classification
- Kingdom: Animalia
- Phylum: Arthropoda
- Subphylum: Chelicerata
- Class: Arachnida
- Order: Araneae
- Infraorder: Araneomorphae
- Family: Zodariidae
- Genus: Lachesana
- Species: L. tarabaevi

Binomial name
- Lachesana tarabaevi Zonstein & Ovtchinnikov, 1999

Species of spider

Lachesana tarabaevi is a species of ant spider found in Central Asia.

Latarcins were first isolated from L. tarabaevi venom. Its venom was also used in the initial discovery of cyto-insectotoxins.
