= Karger Publishers =

Swiss medical books publisher

S. Karger AG
- Founded: 1890
- Founder: Samuel Karger
- Country of origin: Switzerland
- Headquarters location: Basel
- Publication types: Academic journals, books
- Nonfiction topics: Science and medicine
- Official website: www.karger.com

Karger Publishers, also known as Karger Medical and Scientific Publishers and S. Karger AG, is an academic publisher of scientific and medical journals and books. Karger Publishers was acquired by Oxford University Press in November 2025.

== History ==
The company was founded in 1890 in Berlin by Samuel Karger, who remained at the helm of the company until his death in 1935. His son, Heinz Karger led the company until his death in 1959, and Heinz's son (and Samuel's grandson) Thomas Karger took over the leadership of the company; he was followed as the company leader by his eldest son, Steven Karger, and, most recently, by his youngest daughter, Gabriella Karger, who led the publishing house till 2025 Its first medical journal, Dermatologische Zeitschrift (later: Dermatologica, now: Dermatology) was established in 1893. The company published works from well-known scientists such as Sigmund Freud. Because of political pressure from the Nazi regime, the company was relocated to Basel, Switzerland, in 1937 and lost all German authors and editors. This led to a more international focus and most journal titles were changed from German to Latin and articles were now published in either German, English, French, or Italian. The company currently publishes over 95 journals, and over 9,000 e-book titles. Karger Publishes was acquired by Oxford University Press in November 2025.

== Journals ==
Journals published by Karger include:

- Acta Haematologica
- Annals of Nutrition and Metabolism
- Blood Purification
- Brain, Behavior and Evolution
- Cardiology
- Caries Research
- Cells Tissues Organs
- Cerebrovascular Diseases
- Chemotherapy
- Cytogenetic and Genome Research
- Dermatology
- European Addiction Research
- European Neurology
- Folia Primatologica
- Gerontology
- Hormone Research in Paediatrics
- Intervirology
- Kidney and Blood Pressure Research
- Neonatology
- Neuroepidemiology
- Neuropsychobiology
- Ophthalmic Research
- Pathobiology
- Phonetica
- Psychopathology
- Psychotherapy and Psychosomatics
- Research in Complementary Medicine
- Skin Pharmacology and Physiology
- Stereotactic and Functional Neurosurgery
