= Psychopathology (journal) =

- Discipline: Psychopathology, Psychiatry
- Language: English
- Edited by: Thomas Fuchs, Michael Kaess, Mark F. Lenzenweger

Publication details
- Former names: Monatsschrift für Psychiatrie und Neurologie, Psychiatria et Neurologia, Psychiatria Clinica
- History: 1897-present
- Publisher: Karger Publishers (Switzerland)
- Frequency: Bimonthly
- Open access: Hybrid
- Impact factor: 1.9 (2023)

Standard abbreviations
- ISO 4: Psychopathology

Indexing
- CODEN: PSYHEU
- ISSN: 0254-4962 (print); 1423-033X (web)
- OCLC no.: 10322077

Links
- Journal homepage; Online access

Psychopathology is a peer-reviewed medical journal published by Karger Publishers for over 125 years. Established in 1897 as Monatsschrift für Psychiatrie und Neurologie by Samuel Karger and German doctors Carl Wernicke and Theodor Ziehen, the journal continued in 1957 as Psychiatria et Neurologia, which split in 1968 into Psychiatria Clinica and European Neurology. Finally, in 1984 it was renamed to Psychopathology.

== Abstracting and indexing ==
The journal is indexed in, but not limited to,:

- PubMed/MEDLINE
- Scopus
- Web of Science

== Editors-in-Chief ==
Founders: Carl Wernicke and Theodor Ziehen

Successors:

- Karl Bonhoeffer (1912—1938)
- Jakob Klaesi (1939—1967)
- E. Grünthal (1953—1973)
- Nikolaus Petrilowitsch (1968—1970)
- Th. Spoerri (1971—1973)
- P. Berner (1974—1999)
- E. Gabriel (1974—2004)
- Ch. Mundt (2000-2011)
- Sabine Herpertz (2012-2024)
