= Antimicrobial chemotherapy =

Antimicrobial chemotherapy is the clinical application of antimicrobial agents to treat infectious diseases.

There are five types of antimicrobial chemotherapy:

- Antibacterial chemotherapy, the use of antibacterial drugs to treat bacterial infections
- Antifungal chemotherapy, the use of antifungal drugs to treat fungal infections
- Anthelminthic chemotherapy, the use of antihelminthic drugs to treat worm infections
- Antiprotozoal chemotherapy, the use of antiprotozoal drugs to treat protozoan infections
- Antiviral chemotherapy, the use of antiviral drugs to treat viral infections

== See also ==
- Antimicrobial Agents and Chemotherapy
- British Society for Antimicrobial Chemotherapy
- Chemotherapy (journal)
- Journal of Antimicrobial Chemotherapy
- Chemotherapy § The term chemotherapy
