= Toxicology (journal) =

- Discipline: Toxicology
- Language: English
- Edited by: Thomas Knudsen, Mathieu Vinken

Publication details
- History: 1973-present
- Publisher: Elsevier
- Frequency: 36/year
- Impact factor: 4.221 (2020)

Standard abbreviations
- ISO 4: Toxicology

Indexing
- CODEN: TXCYAC
- ISSN: 0300-483X (print); 1879-3185 (web)
- OCLC no.: 01792578

Links
- Journal homepage; Online access

Toxicology is a peer-reviewed scientific journal covering the adverse effects of xenobiotics on the health of humans and other animals. It is affiliated with the German Toxicology Society.

== Abstracting and indexing ==
The journal is abstracted and indexed in BIOSIS Previews, Cambridge Scientific Abstracts, Chemical Abstracts, Current Contents/Life Sciences, EMBASE, MEDLINE, PASCAL, Science Citation Index, and Scopus. According to the Journal Citation Reports, the journal has a 2020 impact factor of 4.221.
