= Cardiology (journal) =

- Discipline: Cardiology
- Language: English
- Edited by: Dan Atar

Publication details
- Former name(s): Cardiologia, Heart Drug
- History: 1937–present
- Publisher: Karger Publishers (Switzerland)
- Frequency: Bimonthly
- Open access: Hybrid
- Impact factor: 1.7 (2024)

Standard abbreviations
- ISO 4: Cardiology

Indexing
- CODEN: CAGYAO
- ISSN: 0008-6312 (print); 1421-9751 (web)
- OCLC no.: 02064881

Links
- Journal homepage; Online access

Cardiology is a bi-monthly peer-reviewed medical journal published by Karger Publishers. Established in 1937 as Cardiologia by Bruno Kisch and Wilhelm Löffler, the journal was published under the name Cardiology from 1971 and in 2005 it incorporated the medical journal Heart Drug.

== Scope ==
The journal covers clinical, pre-clinical, and fundamental research as well as topical comprehensive reviews in selected areas of cardiovascular disease. Following the incorporation of the journal Heart Drug, Cardiology has included coverage of issues relating to cardiovascular clinical pharmacology and drug trials.

== Abstracting and indexing ==
The journal is indexed in, but not limited to,:

- PubMed/MEDLINE
- Scopus
- Web of Science

== Editors-in-Chief ==
Founders: Bruno Kisch and Wilhelm Löffler (doctor)

Successors:

- R. Hegglin (1962-1969)
- I. Mahaim (1962-1965)
- P. Moret (1966-1969)
- P.M. Galletti (1966-1979)
- Jan J. Kellermann (1980-1990)
- Joseph S. Alpert (1990-2005)
- Jeffrey S. Borer (2006-2018)
- Dan Atar (2019-present)
