= Chemotherapy (journal) =

- Discipline: Oncology
- Language: English
- Edited by: G. Minotti

Publication details
- Former name(s): Chemotherapia
- History: 1960-present
- Publisher: Karger Publishers
- Frequency: Bimonthly
- Impact factor: 1.288 (2014)

Standard abbreviations
- ISO 4: Chemotherapy

Indexing
- CODEN: CHTHBK
- ISSN: 0009-3157 (print); 1421-9794 (web)
- LCCN: sf98086361
- OCLC no.: 848525325

Links
- Journal homepage

Chemotherapy: International Journal of Experimental and Clinical Chemotherapy is a peer-reviewed medical journal covering antimicrobial chemotherapy, published by Karger Publishers. The journal was established in 1960 and was originally named Chemotherapia, obtaining its current name in 1968. According to the Journal Citation Reports, the journal has a 2014 impact factor of 1.288.
