= Hormone Research in Paediatrics =

- Discipline: Paediatric endocrinology
- Language: English
- Edited by: S. Cianfarani

Publication details
- Former name(s): Hormones, Hormone Research
- History: 1970-present
- Publisher: Karger Publishers
- Frequency: Monthly
- Impact factor: 2.324 (2019)

Standard abbreviations
- ISO 4: Horm. Res. Paediatr.

Indexing
- CODEN: HRPOA9
- ISSN: 1663-2818 (print); 1663-2826 (web)
- LCCN: 73644526
- OCLC no.: 635551813

Links
- Journal homepage

Hormone Research in Paediatrics is a monthly peer-reviewed medical journal covering paediatric endocrinology published by Karger Publishers and the editor-in-chief is S. Cianfarani, Rome. It is an official journal of the European Society for Paediatric Endocrinology, the Pediatric Endocrine Society and the Sociedade Latino-Americana de Endocrinologia Pediátrica.

== History ==
The journal was established in 1970 as Hormones and renamed Hormone Research in 1973, before obtaining its current title in 2011. The founding editor-in-chief was M. Marois, who was succeeded in 1976 by J. Girard. From 1996 to 2003 the journal was edited by M.B. Ranke, who was succeeded in 2004 by P. Czernichow.

== Abstracting and indexing ==
The journal is abstracted and indexed in:

- Current Contents/Life Sciences
- Current Contents/Clinical Medicine
- Index Medicus/MEDLINE/PubMed
- Biological Abstracts
- Chemical Abstracts
- Excerpta Medica
- Science Citation Index
- BIOSIS Previews

According to the Karger Publishers, the journal has a 2019 impact factor of 2.324.
