= European Society of Toxicology In Vitro =

The European Society of Toxicology In Vitro (ESTIV) is a European scientific organization focused on the advancement of in vitro and in silico toxicology, particularly the development of alternatives to animal testing and the promotion of New Approach Methodologies (NAMs).

== About ==
Founded in 1994, the society brings together researchers, regulators, and industry professionals working in toxicology, risk assessment, and alternative testing sciences. ESTIV currently has approximately 230 members representing 30 countries.

The origins of ESTIV date back to the International Workshop on the Application of Tissue Culture in Toxicology held in Soesterberg, the Netherlands, in 1980. The increasing scientific interest in cell culture–based toxicology methods throughout Europe during the 1980s and early 1990s eventually led to the establishment of a dedicated European scientific society. ESTIV was created to strengthen collaboration among scientists and institutions involved in in vitro toxicology and to support the scientific validation and regulatory acceptance of alternative testing methods.

== ESTIV Activities ==
The society organises international congresses, scientific workshops, and educational training programs focused on toxicology, computational modeling, organ-on-chip technologies, and other non-animal testing approaches. ESTIV has been organising the ESTIV Congress every two years in different European Cities since 1980, and it is attended by scientists from academia, pharmaceutical companies, chemical industries, and regulatory agencies across Europe and beyond.

In 2024, ESTIV established the Early Career Network (ECN), promoting opportunities for early-career scientists working in in vitro and in silico toxicology. The ESTIV ECN organises a mentorship programme for early-career professionals and actively contributes to the organisation of the ESTIV congresses and the ESTIV Applied Training Courses.

ESTIV is affiliated with two peer-reviewed scientific journals, Toxicology in Vitro, published by Elsevier, and Alternatives to Laboratory Animals (ATLA), supported by FRAME and published by SAGE. Both journals publish research on the use of in vitro and in silico systems for toxicological evaluation and safety assessment and are indexed in MEDLINE and other major scientific databases.

The society has also collaborated with European and international organisations involved in toxicology research, focusing on the implementation of alternatives to animal testing, including ASCCT, JSAAE, EUSAAT, and institutions associated with the European Union’s efforts to reduce animal experimentation in scientific research, such as EURL-ECVAM.

== Honorary members of the ESTIV Society ==
- Monique Adolphe (Ɨ 2022), France, founding member of ESTIV
- Michael Balls, UK
- Diane Benford, UK, founding member of ESTIV
- Bas Blaauboer, The Netherlands
- Bob Combes, UK (Ɨ2021), ESTIV president 1999–2002
- Chantra Eskes, Switzerland, ESTIV president 2012-2016
- Sjeng Horbach, The Netherlands
- Greet Schoeters, Belgium, ESTIV president 2009-2012
- Horst Spielmann, Germany, ESTIV president 2002-2008
- Jan Van der Valk, The Netherlands
- Mathieu Vinken, Belgium, ESTIV president 2016-2020
- Flavia Zucco, Italy, First ESTIV president 1994-1998, founding member of ESTIV
