= Neuropsychobiology =

- Discipline: Biological psychiatry, Neuropsychiatry
- Language: English
- Edited by: Eva Reininghaus

Publication details
- Former name: International Pharmacopsychiatry
- History: 1975-present
- Publisher: Karger Publishers (Switzerland)
- Frequency: Bimonthly
- Open access: Hybrid
- Impact factor: 2.3 (2023)

Standard abbreviations
- ISO 4: Neuropsychobiology

Indexing
- CODEN: NPBYAL
- ISSN: 0302-282X (print); 1423-0224 (web)
- OCLC no.: 01809731

Links
- Journal homepage; Online access

Neuropsychobiology is a peer-reviewed medical journal published by Karger Publishers. Established in 1975 by J. Mendlewicz, the journal incorporated the International Pharmacopsychiatry journal in 1983.

== Scope ==
Neuropsychobiology covers the fields of neurophysiology and functional imaging, neuropharmacology and neurochemistry, neuroendocrinology and neuroimmunology, genetics, and their relationships with normal psychology and psychopathology.

== Abstracting and indexing ==
The journal is indexed in, but not limited to,:

- PubMed/MEDLINE
- Scopus
- Web of Science

== Editors-in-Chief ==
Founder: Julien Mendlewicz (1975–2007)

Successors:

- B. Saletu (1990–2006) - section Pharmacopsychiatry
- P. Netter (1990-2024) - section Biological Psychology/Pharmacopsychology
- W.M. Herrmann (1990–2002) and T. Kinoshita (2003-2024)- section Pharmacoelectroencephalography
- Werner Strik (2005–2023)
- Eva Reininghaus (2024-present)
