= Psychotherapy and Psychosomatics =

- Discipline: Psychosomatic medicine, psychotherapy
- Language: English
- Edited by: Stephan Zipfel

Publication details
- Former name: Acta Psychotherapeutica et Psychosomatica
- History: Since 1953
- Publisher: Karger Publishers
- Frequency: Bimonthly
- Open access: Hybrid
- Impact factor: 18.1 (2024)

Standard abbreviations
- ISO 4: Psychother. Psychosom.

Indexing
- ISSN: 0033-3190 (print); 1423-0348 (web)
- LCCN: 83641238
- OCLC no.: 66468702

Links
- Journal homepage; Online access; Online archive

Psychotherapy and Psychosomatics is a bimonthly peer-reviewed medical journal published by Karger Publishers. It was established in 1953 by Berthold Barend Stokvis under the name Acta Psychotherapeutica et Psychosomatica, obtaining its current name in 1965. The journal covers research concerned with psychosomatic medicine, psychotherapy, and psychopharmacology. It is the official journal of the International College of Psychosomatic Medicine and the World Federation for Psychotherapy.

== Abstracting and indexing ==
The journal is abstracted and indexed in:

- Biological Abstracts
- BIOSIS Previews
- CINAHL
- Current Contents/Clinical Medicine
- Current Contents/Social and Behavioral Sciences
- EBSCO databases
- Embase
- Index Medicus/MEDLINE/PubMed
- ProQuest databases
- PsycINFO
- Science Citation Index Expanded
- Scopus
- Social Sciences Citation Index

According to the Journal Citation Reports, the journal has a 2024 impact factor of 18.1.

== Editors-in-chief ==
The founding editors-in-chief were Berthold Barend Stokvis, later Eugène Antoine Désiré Emile Carp and Barend Joseph Stokvis. They were succeeded by:

- Th. Spoerri (1964–1974)
- P.E. Sifneos (1974–1991)
- G.A. Fava (1992–2022)
- F. Cosci and J. Guidi (2022–2024)
- S. Zipfel (Since 2025)
