= Toxicology in Vitro =

- Discipline: Toxicology
- Language: English
- Edited by: Paul Jennings

Publication details
- History: 1987-present
- Publisher: Elsevier
- Frequency: 8/year
- Impact factor: 2.903 (2014)

Standard abbreviations
- ISO 4: Toxicol. In Vitro

Indexing
- CODEN: TIVIEQ
- ISSN: 0887-2333
- OCLC no.: 59824013

Links
- Journal homepage; Online access

Toxicology in Vitro is a peer-reviewed scientific journal covering in vitro toxicology. It is published semi-quarterly by Elsevier and an official journal of the European Society of Toxicology in Vitro and affiliated with the American Association for Cellular and Computational Toxicology. The editors-in-chief is Paul Jennings and previous editors include Daniel Acosta (University of Cincinnati), Frank A. Barile (St. John's University), and Bas J. Blaauboer (Utrecht University). According to the Journal Citation Reports, the journal has a 2014 impact factor of 2.903, ranking it 29th out of 87 journals in the category "Toxicology".
