= Journal of Cardiovascular Electrophysiology =

- Discipline: Cardiology
- Language: English
- Edited by: Bradley P. Knight

Publication details
- History: 1983-present.
- Publisher: Wiley-Blackwell
- Frequency: Monthly
- Impact factor: 2.942 (2021)

Standard abbreviations
- ISO 4: J. Cardiovasc. Electrophysiol.

Indexing
- CODEN: JCELE2
- ISSN: 1045-3873 (print); 1540-8167 (web)

Links
- Journal homepage; Online access; Online archive

The Journal of Cardiovascular Electrophysiology is a peer-reviewed medical journal that covers research about the study and management of cardiac arrhythmia. The journal was established in 1983 and was originally published by Futura Publishing, which became Blackwell Futura, and is now Wiley-Blackwell.

== Abstracting and indexing ==
The journal is abstracted and indexed by MEDLINE, Science Citation Index, EMBASE, and ProQuest Central. According to the Journal Citation Reports, the journal's impact factor in 2021 was 2.942.

== Editors-in-chief ==
The following persons have been editor-in-chief of the journal:

Douglas Zipes (1990–2004)

Eric Prystowsky (2004–2018)

Ken Ellenbogen (2018-2019)

Bradley Knight (2019–Present)
