= Skin Pharmacology and Physiology =

- Discipline: Pharmacology, dermatologfy
- Language: English
- Edited by: J. Lademann

Publication details
- History: 1988-present
- Publisher: Karger Publishers
- Impact factor: 2.366 (2014)

Standard abbreviations
- ISO 4: Skin Pharmacol. Physiol.

Indexing
- ISSN: 1660-5527 (print); 1660-5535 (web)

Links
- Journal homepage

Skin Pharmacology and Physiology is a peer-reviewed medical journal and an official journal of the Society for Dermopharmacy / Gesellschaft für Dermopharmazie e.V. (GD). It was established in 1988 under the title Skin Pharmacology, renamed to Skin Pharmacology and Applied Skin Physiology in 1998, and obtained its current title in 2003.

According to the Journal Citation Reports, the journal has a 2014 impact factor of 2.366.
