= National Center for Nanoscience and Technology =

Chinese Government Institute

- 国家纳米科学中心
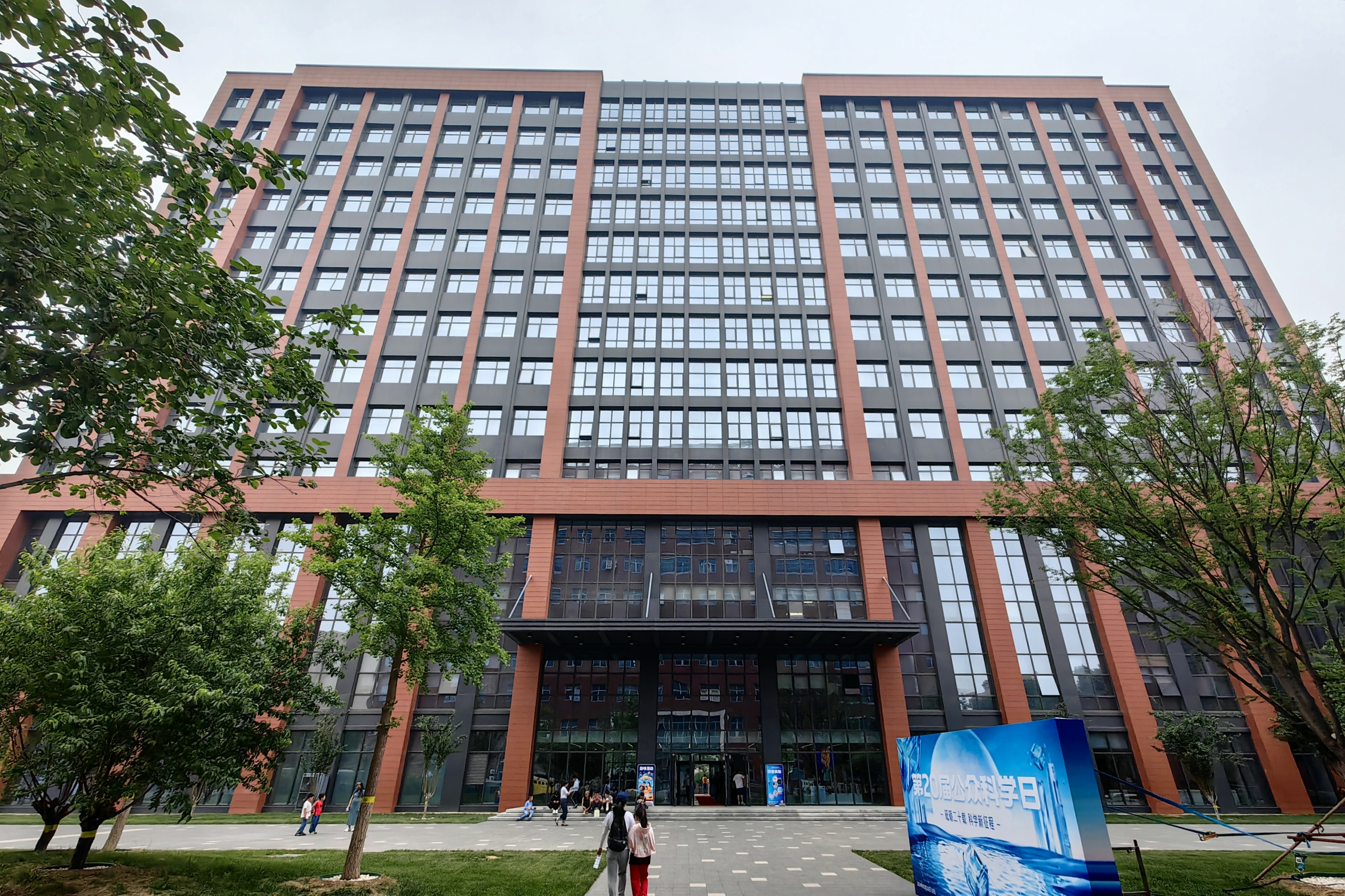
- Logo of National Center for Nanoscience and Technology
- Type: Research institution
- Established: December 2003
- Affiliations: University of Chinese Academy of Sciences
- Director: Zhiyong Tang
- Location: No. 11 Zhongguancun Beiyitiao, P.R. China, Beijing, Beijing, 100190, China
- Campus: Urban
- Website: http://english.nanoctr.cas.cn

The National Center for Nanoscience and Technology (NCNST; Chinese: 国家纳米科学中心) of China is a government initiated research institute with an emphasis on nanoscience and nanotechnology.

== History ==
The NCNST was initiated by the Chinese Academy of Sciences (CAS) and the Ministry of Education, and it was founded by the Chinese Academy of Sciences, Peking University, and Tsinghua University on December 31, 2003.

== Governance ==
The governance of NCNST is carried out by the director and administrative staff with the aid of an academic committee under the leadership of a governing board. The first director of NCNST was Chunli Bai, the executive vice president of CAS. The current director is Chen Wang and the overseas director is Zhonglin Wang, Regents' Professor at the Georgia Institute of Technology. The governing board of NCNST consists of representatives from the National Development and Reform Commission, Ministry of Education, Science and Technology, Ministry of Finance, Ministry of Health, the Beijing Municipal People's Government, the Chinese Academy of Sciences, the Chinese Academy of Engineering, the National Natural Science Foundation of China, Peking University, and Tsinghua University. The academic committee is responsible for aiding the governing board to determine important research areas and moving directions of NCNST.

== Structures and Functions ==
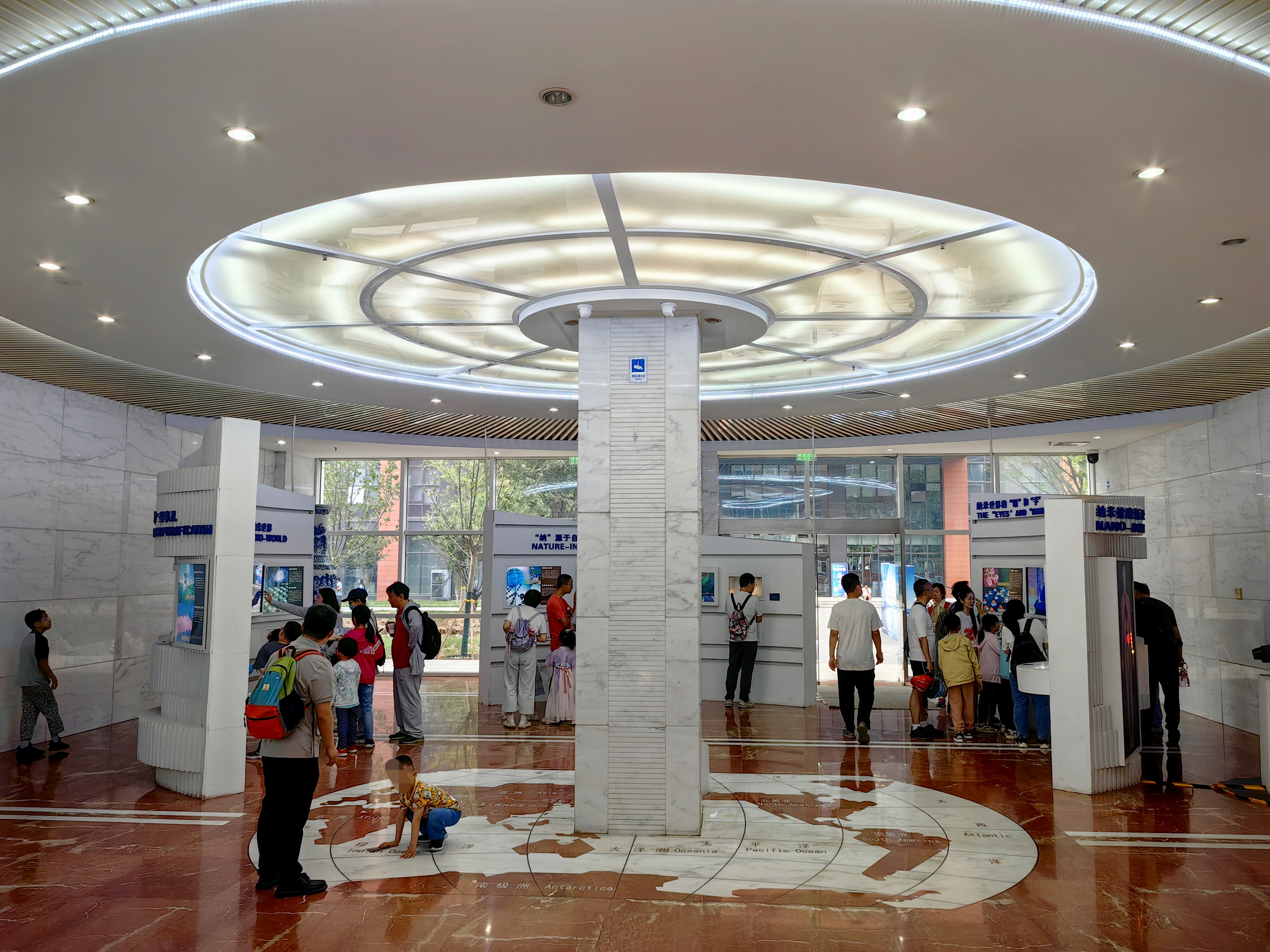
The ground floor of the Scientific Research Building, National Center for Nanoscience and Technology

The NCNST consists of several research laboratories and support infrastructures, including nano-processing and nano-device laboratories, nano-materials and nano-structure laboratories, nano-medicine and nano-biotech laboratories, nano-structure characterization and test laboratories, coordination laboratories, a website, and some databases for nanoscience.

In NCNST, basic and applied research in nanoscience is emphasized as the main research direction. NCNST is dedicated to building a public technological platform and research infrastructure for nanoscience, which features state-of-the-art equipment and is open to both domestic and international users.
