= Julien Bogousslavsky =

Swiss neurologist

Julien Bogousslavsky (born May 1, 1954 in Paris, France) is a Swiss neurologist who has been Chief of Neurology and Neurorehabilitation Services at Clinique Valmont, a hospital in Montreux, Switzerland, since 2006. He is also the medical head at the Center for Brain and Nervous System Diseases and an invited professor at the University of Franche-Comté in France.

His father was Serge Bogousslavsky, an art thief known for stealing the Jean Antoine Watteau painting L'Indifferent from the Louvre in 1939. He was educated at the University of Geneva, graduating in 1978. He became a consultant neurologist at Lausanne University Hospital in 1984.

In 1990, Bogousslavsky co-founded the European Stroke Conference, and served as chairman of the European Stroke Council from 1998 to 2000.

On March 12, 2009, Bogousslavsky was found guilty of multiple fraud charges, including one of embezzling the equivalent of almost US$7.6 million. At his 2010 trial, he was sentenced to two years in prison and fined 70,000 euros.
