= Toxicology Letters =

- Discipline: Toxicology
- Language: English
- Edited by: Angela Mally

Publication details
- History: 1977-present
- Publisher: Elsevier
- Frequency: 24/year
- Impact factor: 4.372 (2020)

Standard abbreviations
- ISO 4: Toxicol. Lett.

Indexing
- CODEN: TOLED5
- ISSN: 0378-4274 (print); 1879-3169 (web)
- OCLC no.: 03180425

Links
- Journal homepage; Online access; RSS

Toxicology Letters is a peer-reviewed scientific journal for the rapid publication of short reports on all aspects of toxicology, especially mechanisms of toxicity. Toxicology Letters is the official journal of Eurotox. (Eurotox exists as a Society within the meaning of Art. 60 et seq. of the Swiss Civil Code. The registered address of Eurotox is in Basel.)

Editors-in-chief are Wolfgang Dekant (Julius-Maximilians-Universität Würzburg, Germany), Scott Garrett, University of North Dakota, and Yunbo Li (Edward Via College of Osteopathic Medicine, Virginia). James P. Kehrer is editor emeritus (Washington State University, USA, retired).

According to the Journal Citation Reports, Toxicology Letters has a 2020 impact factor of 4.372.
