= Boyd Group =

British think tank

The Boyd Group is a Britain-based, independent think tank considering issues relating to animal testing.

== Background ==
The group was founded in 1992, the idea forming from a dialogue between Colin Blakemore, a strong advocate of animal testing and subsequently chief executive of the Medical Research Council, and Les Ward, then director of the anti-vivisection group, Advocates for Animals. The group is named after its chairman, Kenneth Boyd, a professor of medical ethics at the University of Edinburgh.

== Objectives and approach ==
The groups states its primary objective is to act as a "forum for open exchange of views" on "issues of concern" to its membership and, whenever possible, form consensus and make recommendations. However, due to the diverse membership, the group will often fail to find consensus. In these situations, they aim to publish "an agreed account of where members (as people familiar with the issues) differ from one another, regarding what they consider to be the relevant facts, the best interpretation of these facts and relevant moral arguments". Issues for debate are raised by members, then discussed by the group (or a sub-group). Occasionally, the group may communicate with other bodies, such as Pro-Test.

Patrick Bateson has said of the group:

I was involved [with the Boyd Group] when Kenneth Boyd was doing his early report with Jane Smith for the Institute of Medical Ethics. We were a disparate group of people ranging from some gung-ho scientists on the one hand to some hard-line animal rights people on the other hand. We worked together for three years and eventually we were all talking to each other. It can be done. Even the groups which seem so implacably opposed can end up understanding that there might be agreed positions, because the moral issues are numerous and we have to try to bring these very different forms of morality together.

The Boyd Group has been criticized by some anti-vivisection organisations. Representatives of the National Anti-Vivisection Society (NAVS) told a House of Lords select committee the Boyd Group is a "talking shop" with a "pre-set agenda." However, Les Ward defended Advocates for Animals' membership of the group and the effectiveness of a collaborative approach:

Before cosmetic testing was abolished by the government, or a ban introduced, the Boyd Group called for it to be banned. That was great, here was the animal welfare and the scientific community going together to the Home Office with a powerful voice and putting the case forward."

== Membership ==
The group had, according to Blakemore in 2002, "about 25 member organisations" including animal welfare groups, anti-vivisectionist groups, charitable bodies, government, industry, veterinarians, academic scientists and philosophers. The membership includes both expert individuals and those nominated by, and representative of, groups or societies. The group invites applications for membership, but excluding only individuals and groups that "support violent activity or break the criminal law". Identified members, past and present, include:

- Professor Colin Blakemore
- Professor Kenneth Boyd
- Bioscience Federation's Animal Science Group
- Professor Stephen R. L. Clark
- Dr Robert Hubrecht
- Advocates for Animals
- RSPCA
- Fund for the Replacement of Animals in Medical Experiments
- The Association of the British Pharmaceutical Industry
- Professor Patrick Bateson

The Boyd Group lacks representation from a number of large anti-vivisectionist organisations, with Blakemore admitting their "credibility is reduced because of that". Both Ward and Blakemore have expressed a wish to include more of these organisations, including BUAV, NAVS, PETA and Animal Aid.

Ward has since withdrawn from the Boyd Group, believing it had become "stalemated", but in 2006 continued to defend his participation in "one of the few places where moderate activists and moderate scientists sat down and talked things over."

== Publications ==
- Ethical review of research involving animals: a role for institutional ethics committees? (March 1995)
- Advancing refinement of laboratory animal use (April 1998)
- The use of animals for testing cosmetics (July 1998)
- Genetic engineering: animal welfare and ethics (September 1999)
- The use of non-human primates in research and testing (June 2002)
- The use of animals in testing household products (December 2002)
- Boyd Group/RSPCA: Categorising the severity of scientific procedures on animals (July 2004)

== See also ==
- Animal Procedures Committee
- Animals (Scientific Procedures) Act 1986
- Animal Liberation Front
- Animal liberation movement
- Animal testing
- Animal rights
