= Humane Research Trust =

The Humane Research Trust (HRT) is a British medical research charity with the aim of spreading the practice of humane research. They work with scientists as well as students to further the commitment of non-animal based research.

== History ==
The HRT began life in 1961, after two years of discussions between the National Anti-Vivisection Society (NAVS), the Scottish Society for the Prevention of Vivisection (SSPV), and the British Union for the Abolition of Vivisection (BUAV), as "The Lawson Tait Memorial Trust". These discussions were chaired by Wilfred Risdon, Secretary of the NAVS, who also became Secretary of the new Trust, set up to honour the memory of the Scottish surgeon and anti-vivisectionist, Robert Lawson Tait (1845-1899). The Trust started with capital of £5,000, donated by the three participating Societies, with the intention of awarding “substantial” annual prizes to teams of researchers who published results that would do away with the ‘necessity’ “so often quoted by the apologists in the past as a ‘regrettable necessity’” for the use of living animals in their own line of research. After Risdon's death in 1967, the Trust became the Lawson Tait Medical and Scientific Research Trust. A few years later, “Diehard anti-vivisectionists [who] were unable to bring themselves to agree to a Trust that would do business with any scientist involved in any way with animal research … [w]ith the help of the Commissioner of Charity, the Trustees of the Lawson Tait formed the Humane Research Trust in 1974 to give the wider scope that was needed while retaining the original aims. This was very much welcomed by many far-sighted supporters of the Lawson Tait and has encouraged many lay people, not necessarily involved in the anti-vivisection scene, to applaud and support the HRT.”

== See also ==
- Animal testing
