= Wilfred Risdon =

British activist

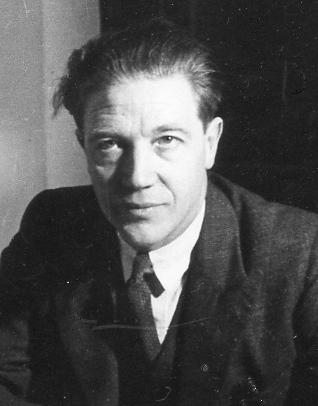
Wilfred Risdon at British Union headquarters, London, England, 1937

Wilfred Risdon (28 January 1896 – 11 March 1967) was an English trade union organizer, a founding member of the British Union of Fascists and an antivivisection campaigner. His life and career encompassed coal mining, trade union work, First World War service with the Royal Army Medical Corps (RAMC), political and animal welfare activism.

== Early life, 1896–1920 ==
Wilfred Risdon was born in Bath, Somerset, England, on 28 January 1896, the youngest of ten surviving children of Edward George Fouracres Risdon (1855–1931), a bespoke boot and shoe maker born in Devonport, Devon, and Louisa née Harris (1851–1911) from Exeter, Devon, who also worked intermittently as a shoe machinist. In his childhood, Wilfred Risdon is reputed to have been a devout Christian because his father was an adherent of the Plymouth Brethren. His grandfather committed suicide in 1862 when Edward Risdon was only 7 years old. This zealous Christianity undoubtedly influenced Wilfred Risdon's later career. Although the 1911 census describes Risdon as working in bookbinding, and he had presumably finished schooling at the age of 14, he soon started working at one of the local Somerset collieries. Although the work would have been physically demanding for such a young boy, the wages might have been marginally better, especially after a few years' experience if it is assumed that he survived.

At the time, many Somerset coal miners moved to South Wales for better career prospects, and at some stage, Risdon joined the exodus. In Wales, he became involved in union work, and either before or during the First World War, he aspired to a South Wales Miners' Federation (SWMF) scholarship for a place at the Central Labour College, in competition with a colleague, Aneurin Bevan, who was awarded the place in 1919 while Risdon was still in Germany with the army of occupation (British Army of the Rhine). Risdon finished his war service with the rank of sergeant but had also suffered shell shock, which affected his heart for the rest of his life. He decided to become a political organiser, and as a result of his association with trade unionists, his inclination was socialist.

== Politics, 1921–1939 ==
Around 1921, Risdon moved to Weymouth, Dorset, perhaps at the invitation of his older brother Charles Risdon (1884–1972); he was certainly living there after Charles's first wife Ellen Ann, née Sheppard (born 1884) died in 1922. Risdon was working as a political organiser for the Labour Party and, in 1924, he was selected as Labour candidate for the South Dorset constituency in the October general election. South Dorset was a staunchly-Conservative constituency, and Risdon was defeated by the incumbent, Major Robert Yerburgh, 1st Baron Alvingham. One of the factors contributing to the defeat of Ramsay MacDonald's ten-month minority government was the Zinoviev letter. Risdon went back to his organising work in the south west of England, but he also started cultivating links with Birmingham, most probably because the then regional organiser, J H Edwards, was replaced in 1924 by Clem Jones, previously the divisional Labour Party agent in Smethwick. One of those links was with Fircroft College, "a residential college for working men" and so, as well as meeting his future wife at one of the socialist summer schools in the Birmingham area, he also encountered for the first time his future colleague, mentor and employer, Oswald Mosley, most probably at the 1925 Independent Labour Party (ILP) Easter Conference in Gloucester. Mosley, a recent convert to socialism, was determined to dislodge one of the highest profile members of the "Birmingham Caucus", Neville Chamberlain. He was only narrowly defeated at Ladywood, Birmingham, in the 1924 election, and that aspiration had to take second place to his desire to return to Parliament, which he was able to do in 1926 albeit in an adjacent constituency, Smethwick. There is no specific evidence that Risdon helped with this campaign, but his close association with Mosley at the time is generally acknowledged.

By 1929, Risdon was living in Acocks Green, Birmingham, and he was now Midlands Divisional Organiser for the ILP. The following year, he organised the Easter Conference, held that year in Birmingham. By then, Mosley, although successful in cultivating Labour support in Birmingham and district, had used his own resources to finance the winning of six of the twelve available seats for Labour at the 1929 general election and was becoming increasingly pessimistic about the probability of achieving his goals of economic and social reform, even with a non-cabinet ministerial post, Chancellor of the Duchy of Lancaster. Therefore, he set about drawing up his own proposals, which were referred to as the Mosley Memorandum. After being ignored for over two months, it was finally rejected in May 1930, which convinced Mosley that resignation and criticism of the government from the backbenches was the way forward. By the autumn of that year, there was a "Mosley Group" in Parliament, including Risdon's erstwhile colleague, Aneurin Bevan. Mosley reconstituted the memorandum into a Manifesto, which was published on 13 December 1930. His thinking that the state should play a strong role in the affairs of the country and that it "should constitute a public utility organisation to turn out houses and building materials as we turned out munitions during the war" was made clear in his "immediate plan to meet an emergency situation". However, by then, Mosley had already started making plans for a new political party, including an office at One Great George Street, Westminster, in January 1931, and the same month, the proposals contained in the Memorandum and the Manifesto were published as a 61-page pamphlet, A National Policy, with the authors given as Aneurin Bevan, W. J. Brown, John Strachey and Allan Young.

The New Party was founded on 1 March 1931. Risdon is known to have continued to work as Midlands Divisional Organiser for the ILP until early February but since the core of Mosley's new movement was based in Birmingham (prior to the formation of the New Party, what had already become known as "Mosleyism" had been described as "Birminghamism rampant"), Risdon was undoubtedly one the New Party's founder members. His first major responsibility for the fledgling party was as election agent for Allan Young at the April 1931 by-election at Ashton-under-Lyne, a Labour seat, near Manchester. Young barely saved his deposit by earning third place with 16% of the votes cast. The Labour supporters were angry at their candidate being beaten into second place and formed a raucous mob outside the polling station, but Mosley faced them down and commented to Risdon, "We saw worse than this in the war, Bill". Not long afterward, Risdon was sent to Newcastle to develop a regional organisation in the North-East of England, and by the beginning of October, he had created branches in Hull, Newcastle and Gateshead. Mosley meanwhile initiated a plan for an "active force" of stewards (forerunners of the later controversial "Blackshirts"), who were supplied in part by a nationwide network of athletic clubs that was aimed at British youth. That was deemed necessary to prevent the violence and the intimidation that was a feature of most of the New Party's meetings, but that behaviour was not experienced only by the upstart party.

The central planning of the New Party was at best haphazard, and in July, the support for local party organisation was drastically reduced, but Gateshead was considered important enough to warrant a candidate at the 1931 general election at the end of October. Risdon was again election agent, this time for the candidate James Stuart Barr, an old friend from Birmingham. His main rival was Ernest Bevin, for Labour. Not one of the 50 New Party candidates, including Barr, was successful at the election, which forced forcing Mosley to take stock. The party was reduced to little more than an embryonic Youth Club organisation, known as NUPA (a mnemonic for NuParty), which confirmed the view of many that Mosley appeared to be and indeed was moving towards an openly-fascist party. Risdon was left with little to do and, without a regular salary, opened an advertising agency. He retained a rump of committed New Party supporters. Meanwhile, Mosley was moving ever closer to fascism. He visited Italy in January 1932 to study the Italian version at close quarters and met Benito Mussolini. In May and June, Mosley worked on "his exposition of the policy and philosophy of the new movement", The Greater Britain. Risdon received his copy in September, a month ahead of publication, and set about organising a local branch for Mosley's transformed political movement, the British Union of Fascists (BUF, or "British Union") of which Risdon was a founder member. The inaugural ceremony on 1 October 1932, was attended by 32 founder members, most of whom wore black shirts.

Risdon remained in Newcastle until February 1933, when he moved to London to take up his post as Mosley's first Director of Propaganda. His main area of responsibility was organising Mosley's public meetings, the first of which was held at the Free Trade Hall in Manchester on 12 March. The following month, he was one of a party of 14 from the BUF who visited Italy for Mussolini's International Fascist Exhibition in Rome. At the time, his salary in the BUF was second only to that of Dr. Robert Forgan, Director of Organisation. The first high-profile meeting he organised was at the Albert Hall in London on 22 April 1934, which passed off without any trouble. A few months after the notorious Olympia meeting of 7 June that year, and the Blackshirt stewards were then accused of using excessive force in ejecting troublemakers. Risdon was replaced as DoP by a relative newcomer who was a compelling public speaker, William Joyce. Risdon moved to Manchester to spearhead a recruiting campaign in the North-West of England, which proved to be very successful: "The BUF opened about a score of propaganda centres in the cotton towns which, under Risdon's direction, enrolled new members by the thousand and were so successful as seriously to worry the Labour Party".

By now, he was writing regularly for the organisation's three albeit not concurrent periodicals, The Blackshirt, Fascist Week and Action as well as occasionally in The Fascist Quarterly. Around then, the police-style Action Press uniform started to be issued to the most dedicated members, but Risdon positively refused to wear it. In 1936, the wearing of political uniforms was banned under the Public Order Act, partly as a response to the violence of Cable Street for which the British Union was not directly responsible. Towards the end of the same year, Risdon was promoted to Assistant Director General (Electoral) as a recognition of his expertise in the field of electoral organisation. The movement also published his book, A Guide to Constituency Organisation. The following year, the British Union published a five-page pamphlet written by Risdon, Strike Action or Power Action?, in which he outlined the benefits to trade unionists of the corporate state, as proposed by British Union.

After the disappointing results in the 1937 London municipal elections (following which Joyce and John Beckett were removed) and with the clouds of war gathering, it appeared to be increasingly unlikely that the planned general election in 1940 would take place although British Union's chances of electoral success were diminishing rapidly. In July 1939, therefore, Risdon left the British Union without even tendering his notice. That was not a precipitate move since he had a position to go to in organising a canvass on public attitudes towards vivisection for an organisation called the London and Provincial Anti-Vivisection Society (LPAVS), whose committee secretary was an erstwhile colleague, Norah Elam, also known as Mrs. (or "Lady") Dacre-Fox.

== Antivivisection, 1939–1967 ==
Risdon had been in his new post for less than a year when he was arrested under Defence Regulation 18B, which facilitated internment without charge or trial, on 23 May 1940 as a potential fifth columnist, along with around 80 other present and former members of British Union, men and women, and taken to Brixton Prison, as was Mosley. They were given the opportunity to appeal, and Risdon's appeal was heard on 11 July before an Advisory Committee chaired by Mr. Norman Birkett KC. No decision was made or conveyed on the day, but it was decided that Risdon was not a threat to national security, and he was released from prison on or around 9 August. He was not able to resume his previous position immediately, but he was back within a matter of weeks, and by February 1941, he was Assistant Secretary. At the end of 1940, however, he made one of his most significant contributions to animal welfare during the war, a design for an air raid shelter for domestic pets that required only a minor alteration to an existing Anderson shelter.

By January 1942, Risdon was Secretary of the LPAVS committee. Meanwhile, he encountered and developed a working relationship with Lord Hugh Dowding, who was committed to animal welfare, including anti-vivisection. During 1956, approaches were made to the National Anti-Vivisection Society (NAVS), with a view towards amalgamation, and at the end of that year, the LPAVS was wound up and incorporated into the larger NAVS. Risdon became Secretary of the combined organisation. There were also moves towards an amalgamation with the British Union for the Abolition of Vivisection (BUAV) at various times, but they did not succeed. In 1961, after two years of negotiations with the BUAV and the Scottish Society for the Prevention of Vivisection (SSPV), the Lawson Tait Memorial Trust, intended to commemorate the Scottish surgeon and anti-vivisectionist, Robert Lawson Tait (1845–1899), was set up with Risdon as Secretary. In 1962, he submitted an essay entitled Vivisection is Fundamentally Evil to a subcommittee on Health and Safety of the United States Committee on Interstate and Foreign Commerce, House of Representatives, chaired by Kenneth A. Roberts, during the second session of the 87th United States Congress. His most audacious public relations coup came in 1964 when he engineered the move of the NAVS headquarters to 51 Harley Street in the heart of the medical establishment.

It was during his time there that Risdon wrote his Biographical Study, an appreciation of the life and work of Lawson Tait, published at the beginning of 1967. The foreword was written by Lord Dowding, who described the work as "Mr. Risdon's remarkable book". It was ironic that Risdon died from a heart attack at his home in Harley Street on 11 March 1967, but his tireless work undoubtedly advanced the cause of anti-vivisection in Britain. A biography written by his grand nephew, J. L. Risdon, called Black Shirt and Smoking Beagles. A Biography of Wilfred Risdon: an unconventional Campaigner was published in 2013, ISBN 978-0-9927431-0-9.

== Private life ==
In addition to his prolific writing, both for British Union, and the LPAVS/NAVS (for which he also wrote under the pseudonym of W. Arr, Risdon was also a regular book critic and reviewer, carpenter, gardener and artist, according to his stepson Brian, and Brian's son Gary.

Risdon met Margaret Ellen (also known as Margaret Helen or Nellie) Geen, née James, (10 March 1895 – 22 March 1981) in Birmingham, through their shared involvement in socialism. She was from Cardiff, south Wales, and already had two children, Sheila (born 1923) and Brian (5 September 1925 – 13 January 2003) from her previous marriage to Alfred Geen, a flour mill worker. She had moved to Birmingham to train as a midwife. They married at Leeds North register office in March 1935, and although Margaret was living and working in Leeds, Risdon continued living in Manchester until February 1936, when he bought a house in north west London for his family. After Risdon's death, Nellie Risdon moved to Reading, Berkshire, and she died in the Sue Ryder hospice at Nettlebed, near Henley-on-Thames in Oxfordshire.
