= Anne (elephant) =

Former circus elephant (born early 1950s)

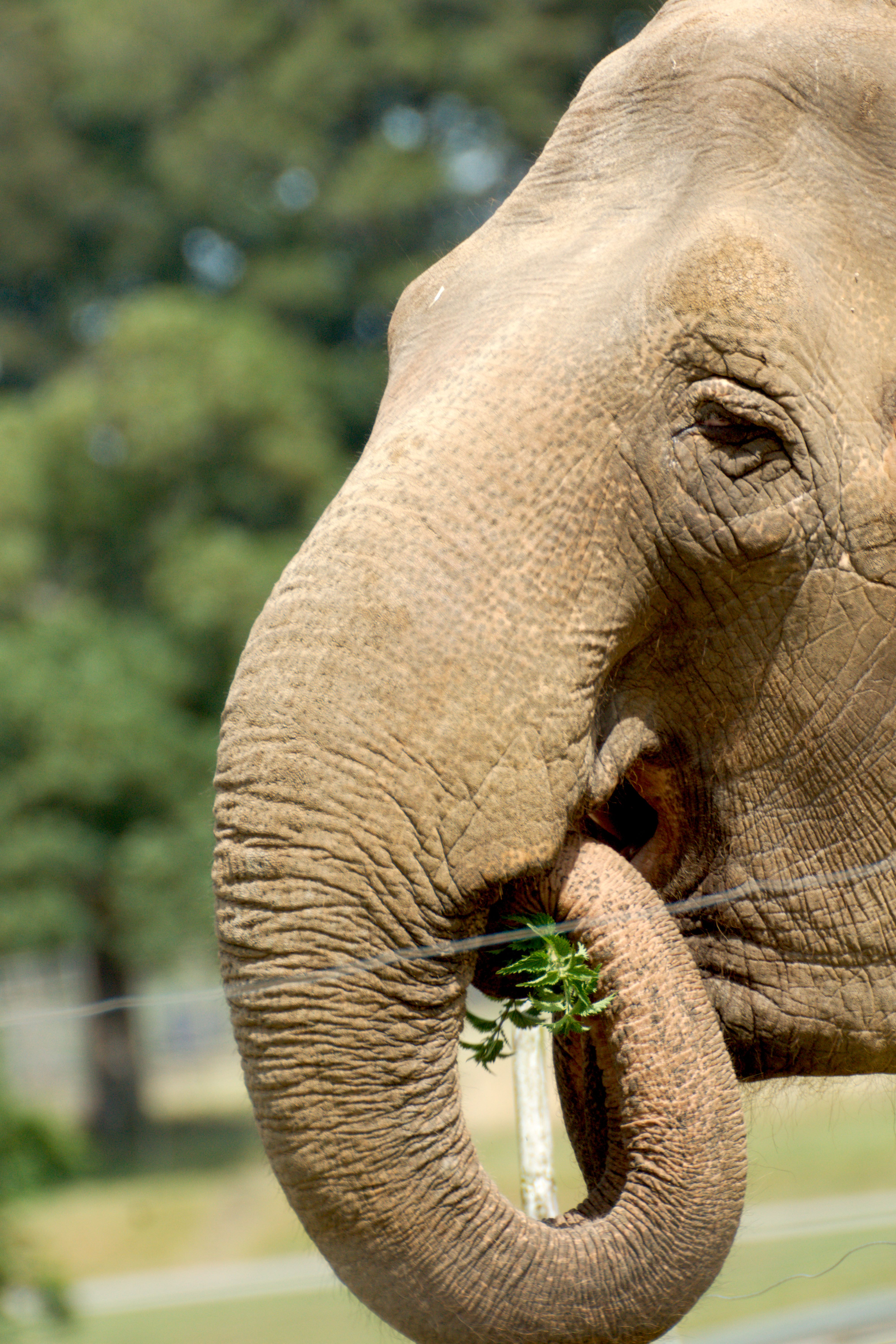
- Anne in 2019
- Species: Asian elephant (Elephas maximus)
- Sex: Female
- Born: Early 1950s Sri Lanka
- Occupation: Circus elephant (1956–2011)
- Residence: Longleat Safari and Adventure Park, Longleat, Wiltshire, England

Anne (born early 1950s) is a female Asian elephant from Sri Lanka. The last circus elephant in the United Kingdom, she resides in the Longleat Safari and Adventure Park in Wiltshire.

== Life ==
Anne is believed to have been born in the early 1950s, making her the oldest recorded Asian elephant in Europe and one of the eldest five elephants worldwide. Native to the Sri Lankan wilderness, she was separated from her mother as a calf and transported to England c. 1956. She and a herd of elephants were part of the Bobby Roberts Super Circus and travelled England as performers. Animal Defenders International (ADI) discreetly documented the abuse of Anne from December 1995 to June 2002; abuse included being whipped into doing tricks, being placed in a small electrically-fenced area, and being locked in animal transporters for long periods. She also nearly died in the summer of 2002, from the abuse, as well as illness, and had been the only elephant with the circus since the 2001 deaths of Beverly and Janey. Anne was unhealthily skinny and was described by an ADI member as 'skeletal'.

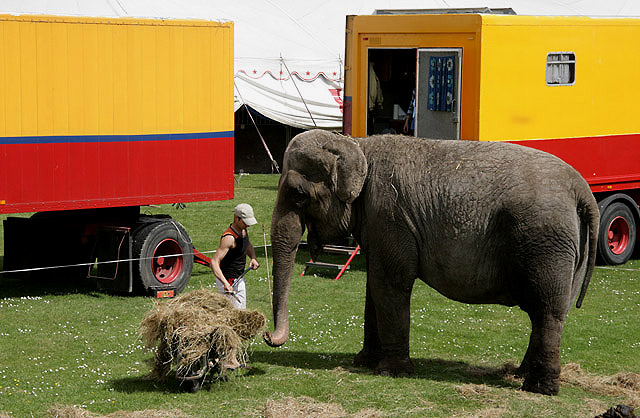
Anne in 2010, while a circus elephant

In 2011, the ADI revealed a video of Anne being beaten with a pitchfork by a caretaker, which resulted in the conviction of Bobby Roberts—the circus owner—on three counts of animal cruelty in 2012. His wife Moira was cleared of charges. Anne was transferred to Longleat Safari and Adventure Park in April 2011. She was the last circus elephant in the United Kingdom.

Longleat was originally a temporary home for Anne, but plans to move her have since ceased. Her enclosure includes a 1,996-square-metre (2,387 sq yd) heated indoor area and a fenced outdoor area. The outdoor area contains a sand pit and a pool; it previously had a mud pit for wallowing. Visitors of Longleat can drive close to Anne. Despite having arthritis and unnatural sleep patterns, her overall health has improved, according to her caretakers.

Anne has not interacted with a fellow elephant since 2001, which has given her the moniker 'the UK's loneliest elephant'. In 2014, experts determined she was unsuited for interacting with fellow elephants due to her severe arthritis. In 2018, the campaign group Anne Needs Elephants unsuccessfully advocated for another elephant to join her. Another effort, which included actress Joanna Lumley as a supporter, to get Anne to be transferred to the European Elephant Sanctuary was rejected by her caretakers, who cited risk of injury. In 2023, she was treated by osteopath Tony Nevin.

== See also ==
- List of individual elephants
