= Gillian Clark (historian) =

British historian

Gillian Clark FBA
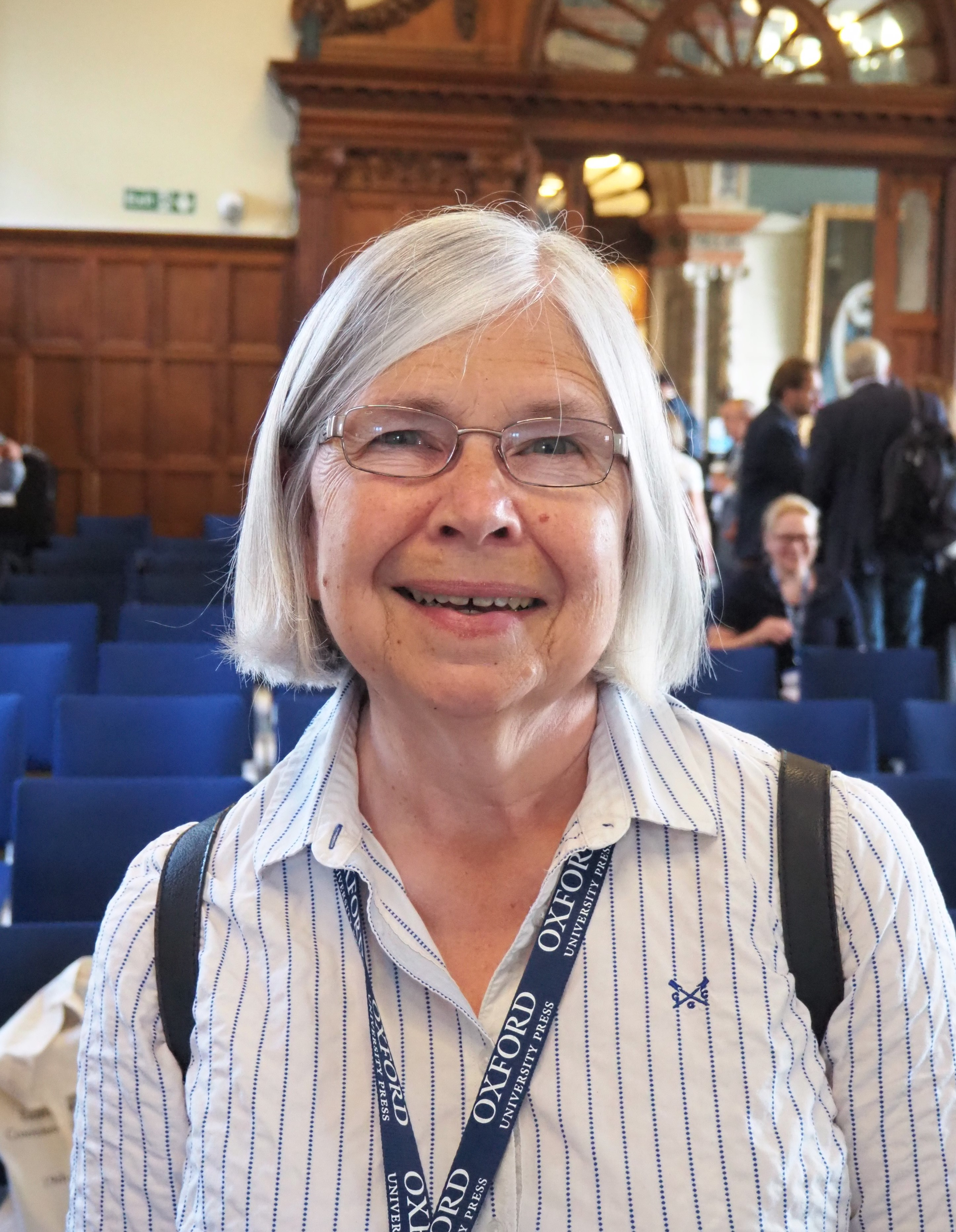
- Clark in August 2019
- Born: Edith Gillian Clark
- Spouse: Stephen R. L. Clark

Academic background
- Education: Somerville College, Oxford
- Thesis: Augustus and the Historians (1973)

Academic work
- Discipline: Classics; history
- Institutions: University of Bristol
- Main interests: Late antiquity

Edith Gillian Clark FBA is a British historian, who is Professor Emerita of Ancient History at the University of Bristol. She retired from the University of Bristol in 2010. Clark is known for her work on the history, literature, and religion of late antiquity.

== Education and career ==
Clark studied Greek and Latin language and literature, ancient history, and philosophy at Somerville College, Oxford. She received her Master of Arts and Doctor of Philosophy degrees from the University of Oxford. She has taught at the universities of Glasgow, St Andrews, Manchester, Liverpool and Bristol.

Clark is currently working on a commentary of Augustine of Hippo's City of God, under contract with Oxford University Press. She is a Fellow of the British Academy and an editor for the Translated Texts for Historians 300–800 series, published by Liverpool University Press. She is editor of the series Oxford Early Christian Studies and Oxford Early Christian Texts, published by Oxford University Press. An event, "Christianity and Roman Society: A Colloquium for Professor Gillian Clark", was held in her honour in 2011 at the University of Bristol and a Festschrift was published in 2014 as a result.

== Selected bibliography ==
- Commentary on Augustine City of God, Books 6-10 (Oxford: Oxford University Press, 2023)
- Commentary on Augustine City of God, Books 1-5 (Oxford: Oxford University Press, 2021)
- Monica: An Ordinary Saint (New York: Oxford University Press, 2015)
- Being Christian in Late Antiquity: A Festschrift for Gillian Clark, edited by Carol Harrison, Caroline Humfress, and Isabella Sandwell (Oxford: Oxford University Press, 2014)
- On Abstinence from Killing Animals (London: Bloomsbury, 2014)
- Late Antiquity: A Very Short Introduction (Oxford: Oxford University Press, 2011)
- Body and Gender, Soul and Reason in Late Antiquity (Farnham: Ashgate, 2011)
- Christianity and Roman Society (Cambridge : Cambridge University Press, 2004)
- Philosophy and Power in the Graeco-Roman World: Essays in Honour of Miriam Griffin, edited by Gillian Clark and Tessa Rajak (Oxford: Oxford University Press, 2002)
- Confessions. Books I–IV (Cambridge : Cambridge University Press, 1995)
- Augustine: The Confessions (Cambridge : Cambridge University Press, 1993)
- Women in the Ancient World (Oxford: Oxford University Press, 1989)
