= Woburn Safari Park =

Safari park in Bedfordshire, England

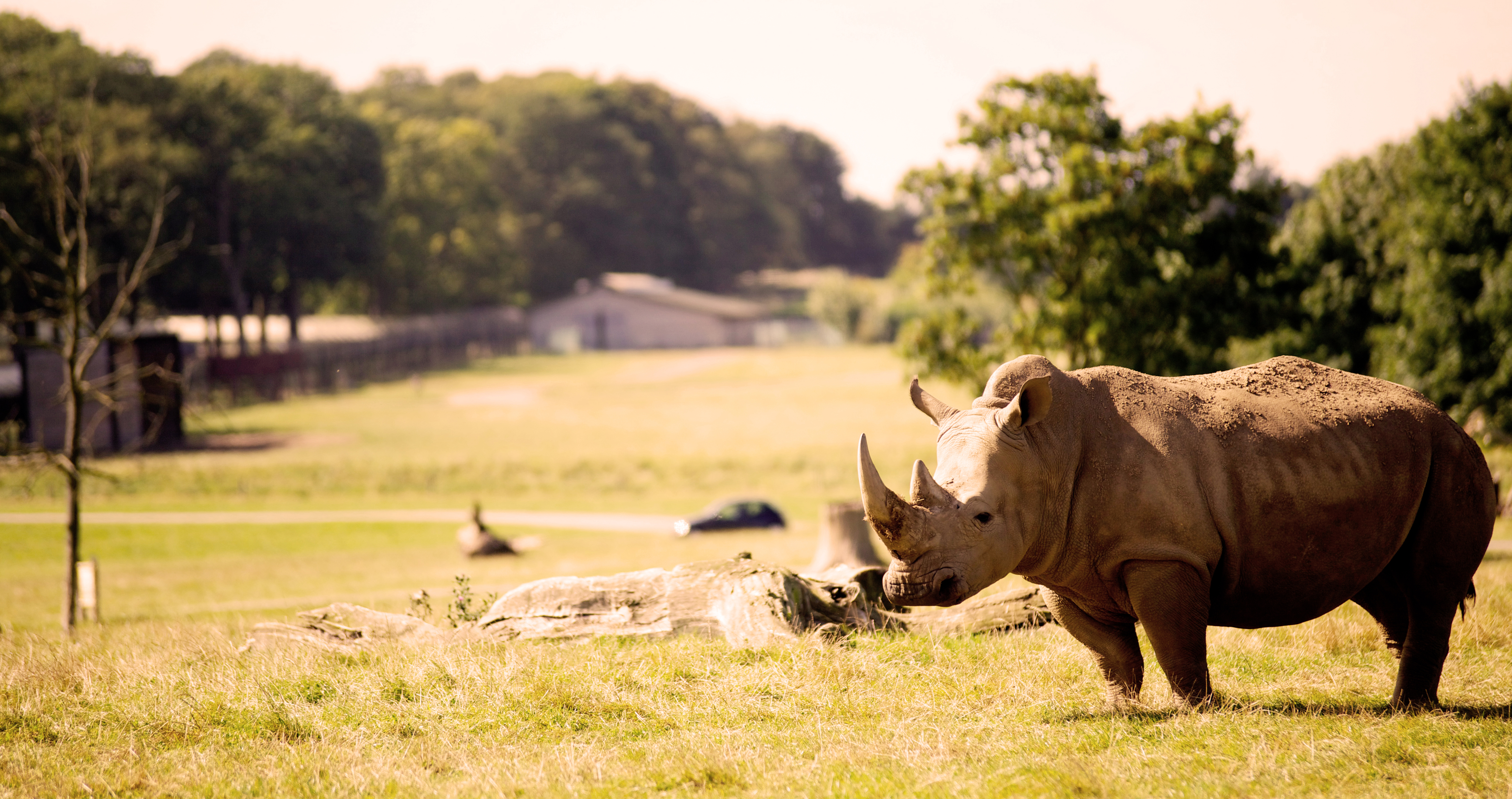
- Southern White Rhino on the Road Safari at Woburn Safari Park
- Interactive map of Woburn Safari Park
- 52.005°N 0.589°W
- Date opened: 1970
- Location: Woburn, Bedfordshire, England
- Land area: 360 acres (150 ha)
- Memberships: BIAZA, EAZA
- Website: www.woburnsafari.co.uk

Woburn Safari Park is a safari park located in Woburn, Bedfordshire, England. Visitors to the park can drive through exhibits, which contain species such as southern white rhinos, elephants, tigers and black bears. It is part of the estates of the Duke of Bedford that also includes Woburn Abbey and its 3,000-acre (1,200 ha) deer park. The Safari Park itself covers 360 acres (150 ha).

Woburn Safari Park is a member of the British and Irish Association of Zoos and Aquariums (BIAZA) and the European Association of Zoos and Aquaria (EAZA).

== History ==
Woburn Safari Park was opened in 1970, established by the 13th Duke of Bedford and Jimmy Chipperfield on the grounds of his estate, Woburn Abbey. This was done as a means to help improve the financial position of the estate and restore the Abbey, which had fallen into disrepair as a consequence of the Second World War and relatively high post-war tax rates. The 11th Duke of Bedford had been president of the Zoological Society of London and had introduced various species such as American bisons, deers, antelopes, lions and tigers to the park.

Starting with upgrades to the wolf facilities in 2004, which allowed the wolves overnight access to the outside enclosure they share with the parks North American black bears, the park had spent about £4 million by 2010 to upgrade off-show animal facilities in the park. The African Ungulate Conservation Centre (or "Antelope House") was built in 2007 to help conservation efforts with hoofed mammals.

The Asian Elephant Conservation Centre, built to house the parks' Asian elephants, opened in 2008. It was followed in 2009 by a new facility for housing the Southern white rhinos and other hoofed animals, as well as an upgrade to the giraffe house that doubled its size.

== Animals ==
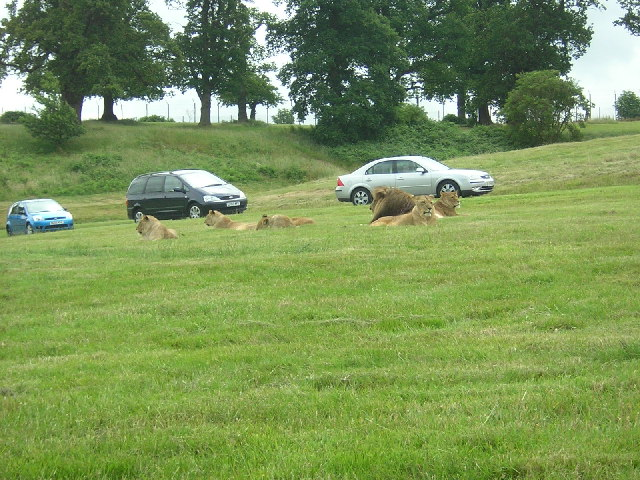
Lion enclosure

The park lets animals roam freely while visitors drive through their enclosures. The species held in the park include Southern white rhinos, elands, Scimitar horned oryxes, Addaxes, Gemsboks, Ankoles, Zebras, African wild asses, Asian elephants, Bactrian camels, North American bisons, bongos, African lions, Canadian timber wolves, North American black bears, and Barbary monkeys.

The park also has a 40-acre (16 ha) leisure area featuring animal talks, petting zones, a gift shop, family restaurant and a Go Ape! course. Animals in the leisure park include lemurs, wallabies, rheas, penguins, goats, ponies, reptiles, red pandas, and marmosets. There is also a soft play centre called the Mammoth Play Ark and an outdoor adventure play area, Jungle Jamboree.

== Road Safari ==
The Road Safari is split into various sections, which house many species of animal, and visitors are able to drive around all five areas. The Northern Plains are home to Chapman's zebras, Brindled Wildebeests, North American Bisons, Przewalksi's horses, and Bactrian camels. Visitors can see these animals as they approach the ticket lanes at the entrance to the Park.

The Savannah Grasslands is located in 40 acres of grounds. Animals within this section of the Road Safari include Southern White Rhinos, Elands, Ankole cattles, Dwarf forest buffaloes, Ostriches, Grevy's zebras and Sable antelopes. Next, visitors can enter The Kingdom of the Carnivores, which sits amongst 71 acres, with animals within this section including Amur Tigers, North American black bears, Canadian timber wolves, and African lions.

In the warmer months, Giraffe Junction is home to Rothschild's giraffes, Blesbok, Scimitar Horned oryxes, Somali wild asses, and Addaxes. The African Forest houses Barbary Macaques; they share this enclosure with the critically endangered Eastern Mountain Bongo.

== Foot Safari ==
Once visitors have enjoyed the Road Safari section of the Park, they will naturally progress to the Foot Safari which is home to many smaller animals including Slender Tailed Meerkats, African Crested Porcupine, Asian Short Clawed Otters, four species of lemur which include Ring Tailed Lemurs, Black and White Ruffled Lemurs, Red Bellied Lemurs and Red Fronted Lemurs, as well as many other species.

Visitors can also enjoy animal talks and demonstrations throughout the day. These take place daily with many animals including Greater Sulphur Crested Cockatoo, Californian Sea Lions, Humboldt Penguins, Red pandas, Capybara, and even the Asian Elephants.

== Conservation ==
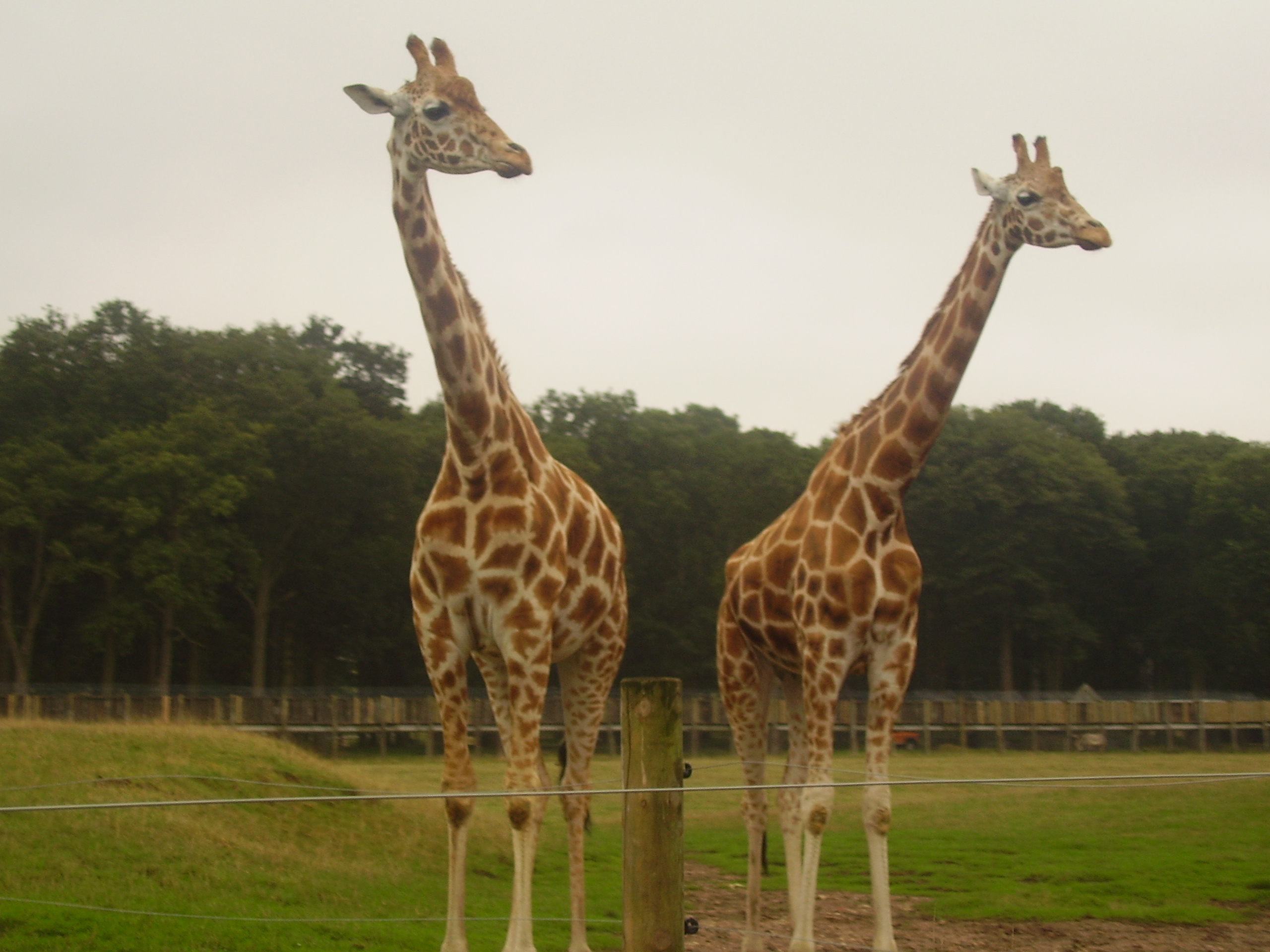
Rothschild's giraffes are rare in the wild, but Woburn has many.

The park is committed to animal conservation and is involved in international breeding programmes to help save endangered species, and includes one of the world's largest hoofstock facilities - The African Ungulate Conservation Centre, as well as an Asian elephant facility.

The park manages the breeding programme for the Mountain Bongo, and has been one of the most successful breeders of the Rothschild's giraffe in Europe. Woburn Safari Park is also the only zoo in the UK to hold Vietnamese Sika Deer - a species extinct in the wild.

Woburn has won BIAZA's (British Association of Zoo's and Aquariums) for animal welfare for its management of Californian Sea Lions (2008) and Rothschild's giraffe (2004) as well as winning the BIAZA award for Education and Marketing in 2008.

== Other features ==
Woburn Safari Park is part of the Duke of Bedford's Estate and when combined with the acreage of the deer park which surrounds the safari park (home to the endangered Pere David's deer), it represents the largest ex-situ conservation facility in Europe and the first 'captive' breeding facility to rescue a species from extinction in the wild with its success with the Pere David deer. Woburn was also instrumental in saving the Mongolian Wild Horse.

== Developments ==
In 2010 the UK Department for the Environment, Food and Rural Affairs (DEFRA) criticised the park for keeping lions in overcrowded pens for up to 18 hours a day in winter, and keeping sea lions in chlorinated water. However, DEFRA acknowledged that the park was already working to correct these issues and praised other newer facilities within the safari park. Although a new, larger overnight facility for lions was already under construction and would allow outside access as well, Woburn Safari Park commented that even the old facility was large enough because the lions could move between the pens. Despite initial plans to move the sea lions to another park, the animals were retained and a new biological water treatment system installed. A new lion facility was completed in autumn 2010. A new tiger house was completed in 2013, with room for up to nine tigers.

== Recent developments ==
In 2017, a new enclosure called 'Farmyard Friends' was opened featuring sheep, goats, ponies, donkeys and pigs. The park welcomed red pandas for the first time in 2017, with their new enclosure Himalayan Heights being completed. A state-of-the-art Giraffe House opened to the public in 2018, giving visitors the opportunity to get up close to the Rothschild's giraffe herd all year round.

In 2019, new and upgraded animal housing was added to the camel and zebra paddocks. In addition, 2019 saw the opening of two new animal attractions, Alpaca Outpost and the immersive walk-through Land of Lemurs enclosure.

== Criticism ==
In March 2017, the safari park was criticised for neglectfully allowing the death of a peacock and failing to report the repeated escape of a monkey from its enclosure. A peacock was placed into isolation, but was forgotten about and not fed, leading to its death from starvation. A Barbary macaque fled its enclosure at Woburn Safari Park three times in one day, but remained inside the Bedfordshire zoo's grounds. Born Free Foundation head of animal welfare Chris Draper claimed there was "a systematic deficiency in the current system of zoo inspections across the board".

In January 2018, a fire claimed the lives of thirteen Patas monkeys. According to the safari park’s website, the monkeys had 6.5 hectares (16 acres) in which to roam but were confined to their house at night-time during the winter. The Captive Animals’ Protection Society said the fire showed the dangers animals were exposed to in zoos, Nicola O’Brien, a campaign manager for the charity, said: “It’s just one of the risks of having animals trapped in cages. It must have been an absolutely horrific death for them. Obviously accidents do happen, but we do think it calls into question the whole point of why we place animals in captivity in the first place".

== Railway ==
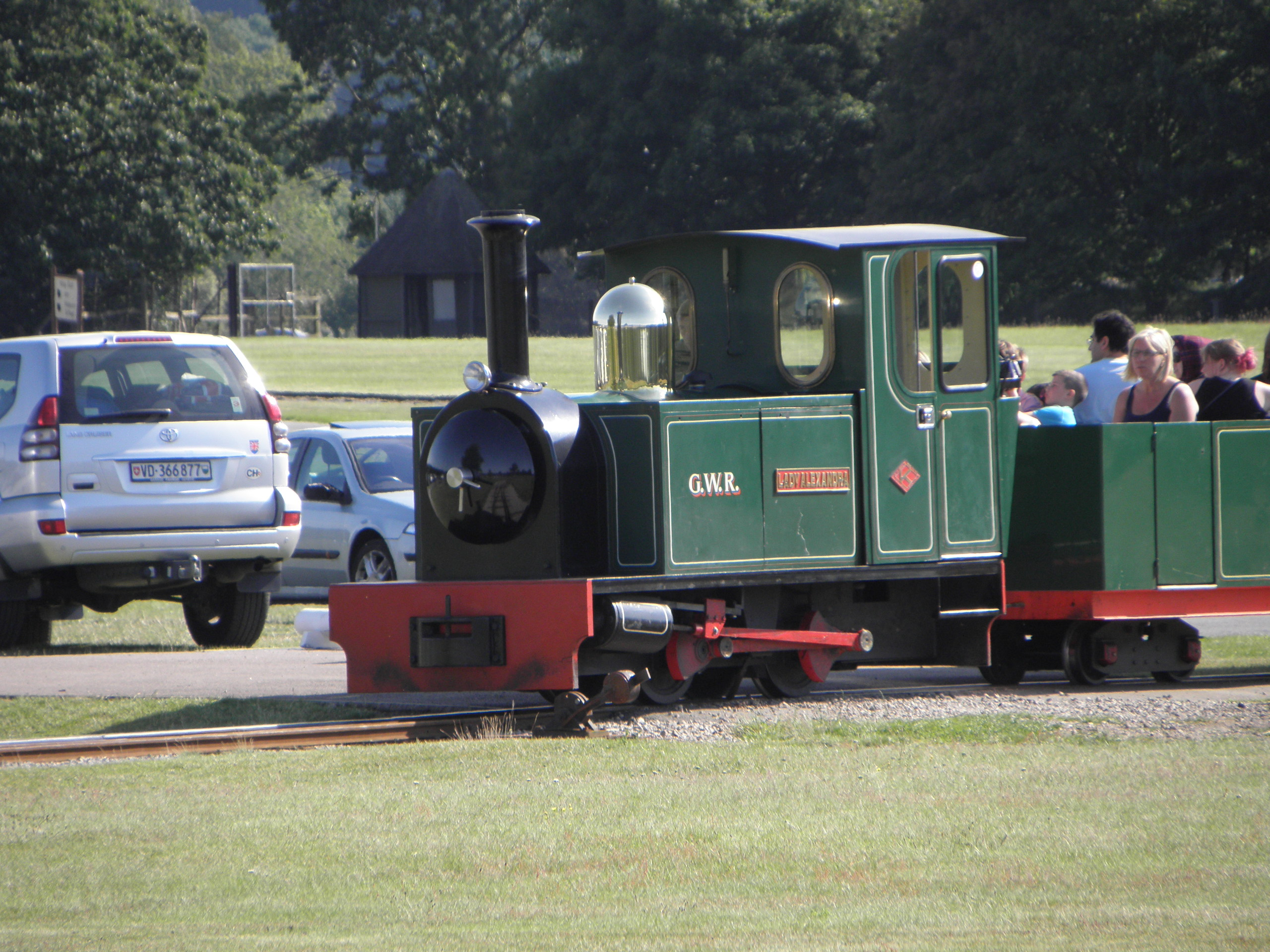
Locomotive "Lady Alexandra" hauling a passenger train.

There is a 20 in (508 mm) gauge railway, the "Great Woburn Railway". In 2011, it was free to use by Safari Park customers. It takes guests on a tour to Alpaca Outpost to see the alpaca herd and around to Elephant Junction in the Foot Safari.

It is a single-track line that consists of one near-circular loop.
