= Chipperfield's Circus =

British family entertainment show

Charles Chipperfield Circus 2016, the 7th generation of the Chipperfield Circus family

Chipperfield's Circus is a British family touring show, continuing a 300-year-old family business.

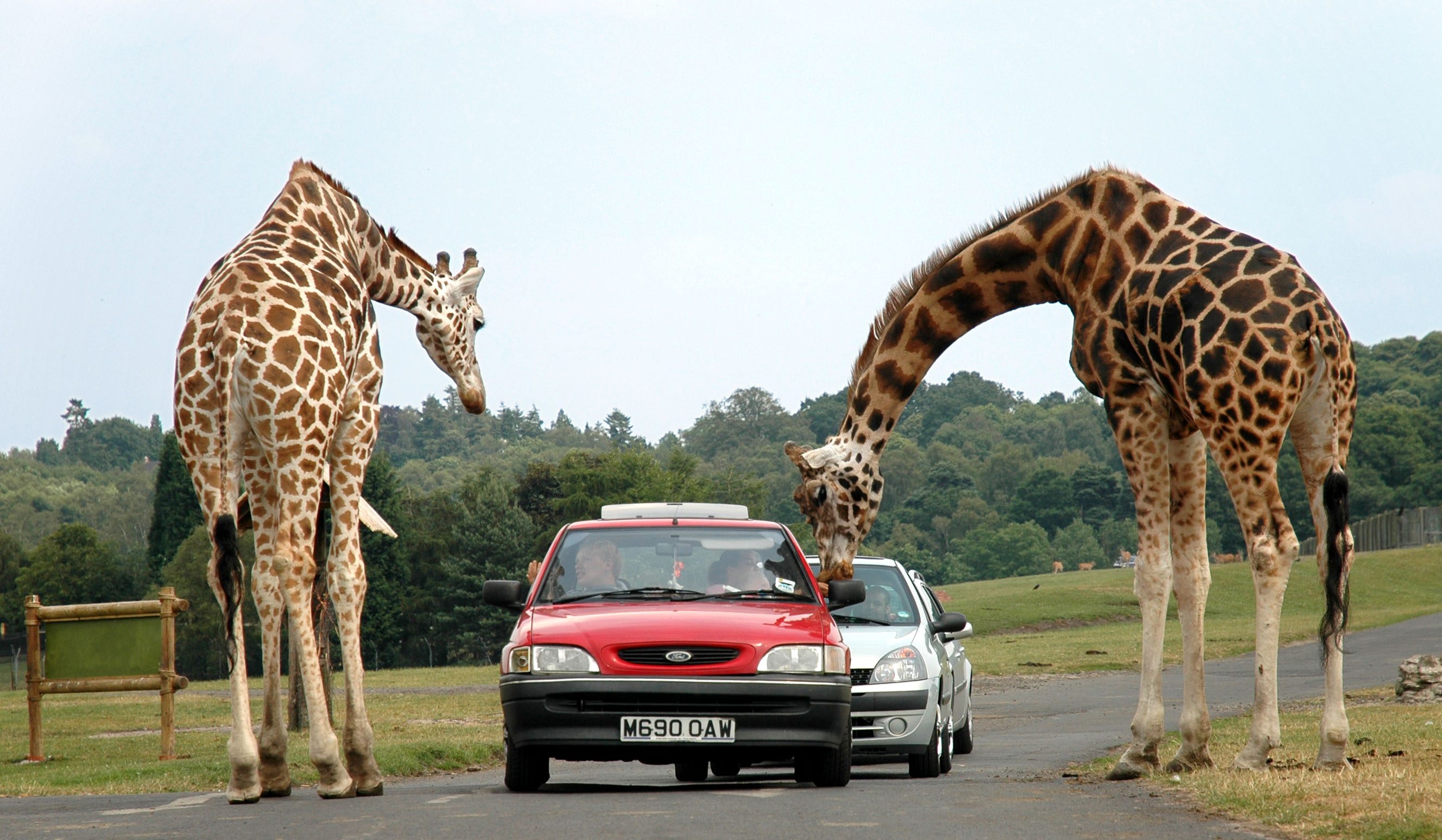
Giraffes at the West Midland Safari Park opened by Jimmy Chipperfield on 17 April 1973

Chipperfield's Circus originates with James Chipperfield with his performing animals at the Thames Frost Fair of 1684. Through the 19th century, the circus toured all of England, with a menagerie of animals, teams of acrobats and clowns. After World War II, under the management of Jimmy Chipperfield, the circus became one of the largest in Europe, with a tent that could hold 6,000 people. The family in the same headship diversified into safari parks (in England founding those at Windsor and Knowsley and co-founding with the Marquess of Bath, Longleat Safari Park as well, with the Duke of Bedford, Woburn Safari Park) and supplying fairgrounds supplies. Since his death in 1990, the circus has toured only intermittently, sometimes featuring members of the extended Chipperfield family.

== History ==
The name Chipperfield dates back at least to James Chipperfield. He introduced performing animals to England at the Frost Fair on the Thames in 1684. His show performed for two months at the fair. Part of the fair was for showing animals.

== James William Chipperfield Sr. ==
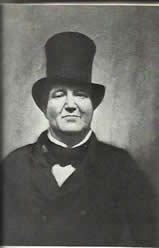
James William Chipperfield Sr. (1775–1866)

James William Chipperfield Sr. (1775–1866) was a bootmaker and made fancy-dress costumes for theatrical use in Drury Lane, London. His business was slow in the summer when he joined travelling fairs and help put on small shows with his wife Mary Ann. The show grew to include dancing bears, monkeys, and trained pigs. In about 1803, James and Mary Ann had a son James William Chipperfield Jr. who would join the show.

== James William Chipperfield Jr. ==
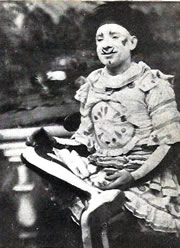
James William Chipperfield Jr. (1803–1866)

James William Chipperfield (1803–1866) grew up in his father's touring show. He was an assistant to Hamlin the conjuror. James married Harriet Amy Coan (4 December 1799-~1866) in Bury St Edmunds and had four children William James (1822– ), James William III (1824–1913), Tom and Mary Phoebe (1826– ). James and Harriet tour with their own show in a horse drawn canvas wagon. Harriet died of pneumonia in 1841 at a fair in Rayleigh, Essex. Later James remarried and continued to tour with an even larger show. He retired and died in 1866. His son, James William III, married Elizabeth Jones, and their children continued the Circus tour.

== James William Chipperfield III ==
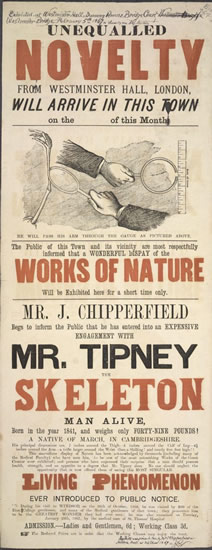
Chipperfield's Circus poster form about 1850

James William Chipperfield (1824–1913) was born in a caravan on 22 April 1824, at St. Martin at Oak, Norfolk. James is the son of James William Chipperfield and Harriet Amy (née Coan).

He began a clowning act with his father in the "Liliputian Circus". It is reported that he entered a den of animals at Wombwells when 14 years old. He started his own show when he acquired and trained a trick pony and worked as a juggler.

He married Elizabeth Jones (4 July 1823 – 1856) in 1846. She died in 1856 at the age of 33. Elizabeth and James had three children: Sophia Sarah (13 December 1846 – 1927) married Henry Wesley in 1868 – James William Francis (4 October 1848 – January 1917) and Harriett Amy (1852–?). Later he married Sarah Ann Coan (Chapman) (1821–1890) a widow of John Coan. Sarah was caring for five of her late husband's children, two of which were Walter Coan and Elizabeth Coan. Sarah and James had 12 children, including: Harriet and James. James and Sarah had all 20 of their children working in the Circus as their grew up. Their daughter appeared as the youngest tight-rope dancer in the country. The Chipperfield's Circus introduced to Britain Zulus from Africa and the Aztecs from Mexico. He also entered in to the marionette is a puppet shows. He gradually worked his way to the front rank of showland with his menagerie, caged "Beast Show" and establishing his winter quarters in Norwich. He exhibited Robert Tippney, the "living skeleton". He was on the road all his life and claimed to be England's oldest showman. James William Chipperfield died at his home, Schwanfelder Street, Beeston, Leeds, in 1913, aged 88 years.

== James Francis Chipperfield ==
James Francis Chipperfield (1848–1917) was an animal trainer and menagerie proprietor in the Chipperfield Circus. Son of James William Chipperfield (1824–1913). James Francis was born 4 October 1848 in Tottenham Court Road, London. He was a member of the third generation of the show family. He performed in every village and town in the country and was a noted trainer of animals. "I can train anything from a rabbit to an elephant", he claimed. He and his wife, Mary Ann (Jones) had nine children, all who worked in the Circus. His son John was a musician in the Circus, his daughter Mary Anne was a juggler and dancer in the Circus, His son Henry left the Circus and started a cinema show. His son Jim (James) was a musician in the Circus, then departed to Ireland and joined the Royal Italian Circus. His daughter Sophia married James Chittock. His daughter, Sarah married Ambrose Tiller a showman in the circus. His daughter, Rachael married Mr. Cartwright. His daughter, Mary Ann married Mr. Bartlett. His daughter, Minnie worked in the circus. His son Richard took over his father's circus in England. Jim (James) Jr. after departing his father's circus married Louisa; they had three daughters: Louisa, Minnie and Lily.

James Francis died in 1917 aged 67; he was buried 8 June 1917 at Abode Fair Ground, Ludgershall, Wiltshire, England.

From the World's Fair:

WF13.1.17: "We regret to have to record the death of Mr James William Chipperfield, who died on Thursday last, January 4, at the age of 68. The deceased was a popular midlands traveler, but for some time has been located at Ludgershall, Wilts., where he was interred.

WF 27.1.17: "The funeral of the late Mr James W. Francis Chipperfield, who died after a long and painful illness on January 9, 1917 at the age of 68 at Ludgershall, Wilts., The deceased was an old and respected showman, being laid to rest with signs of the greatest love and sorrow.

The following relatives and friends were present at the last sad journey (the widow not being able to attend through excessive grief): Mr John Chipperfield (son); Mrs James Chittock (daughter); Mrs A. Tiller (daughter); Mr Richard Chipperfield (son); Mr Henry Chipperfield (son); Mrs R. Cartwright (daughter); Mr Thomas Clark and Mrs John Chipperfield.

The service were conducted by the vicar (Mr Bird).

Patricia "Nanny Pat" Brooker from the ITVBe reality television series The Only Way Is Essex was the granddaughter of Henry Chipperfield and his wife, Edith Florence Holwill (née Buckingham; 1891–1981). Carol Wright is Nanny Pat's youngest daughter.

== Richard Chipperfield Sr. ==
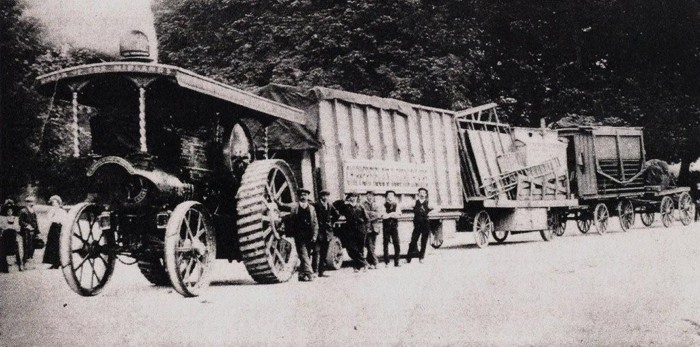
J.M. Chipperfields Electrograph Bioscope was moved by a Burrell-built engine, named "Queen of the Midlands". Chipperfield's Electrograph Bioscope traveled all over the UK starting in 1899.

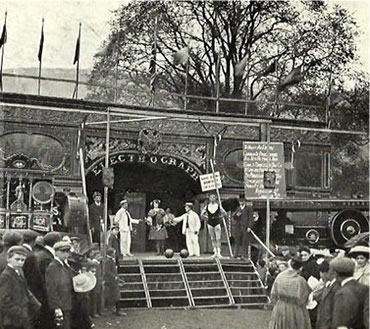
Chipperfield's Electrograph Bioscope

Richard Chipperfield Sr. was the son of James Frances and Mary Ann (Jones) Chipperfield, born in 1875, at Sileby, Leicestershire. He was the fourth generation of the Chipperfield showmen. He first performed in public at the age of five. The management of the circus was passed down to him in the early 1900s. In 1902 he added a Bioscope show to the attractions of the show at Birmingham, Manchester and London. Six films were shown at each presentation. The films included that of Marie Corelli riding in the Shakespeare Birthday procession and the HMS Albion disaster on the River Thames in 1898.

Richard's hobby was painting, particularly of animals; examples adorn the walk-ups of his circus pavilion. He married Maud, daughter of George Seaton. The circus gradually grew and in 1933 combined with the Purchase family. Richard was the father of six children: Dick (Richard) and Jimmy (James) (who took over from their father in 1937), John ("Johnny"), Thomas Henry "Tom", Marjorie and Maud. Richard Chipperfield died in 1959.

== Dick Chipperfield ==
Richard (Dick) Chipperfield (1904–1988), began performing as a clown at the family's fairground variety show when he was just five. Dick's father was Richard Chipperfield (1875–1959), Dick's mother was Emily Maud Seaton. Dick married Myrtle Eileen Slee. Myrtle and Dick had 4 children, two sons and two daughters.

Jimmy, Dick's younger brother, also took part in the show as a clown, a wire-walker and an acrobat.

It was in the early 1930s that the Chipperfields started to become well established in the traditional circus business and by the end of World War II the show had become one of the largest touring circuses in Europe.

After the end of World War II the circus owners traveled to Sri Lanka and bought nine elephants which then led on to further acquisitions and the growth of the circus. During the late 1940s, the RAF Wethersfield base was used as a winter camping ground for the Circus. Elephants were housed in the maintenance hangars and Nissen hut (Quonset), formerly used as offices, became homes for lions, tigers, snakes and monkeys. Jimmy Chipperfield fought as a fighter pilot in World War II.

By 1953, Chipperfield's Circus ousted rivals Bertram Mills and Billy Smart and boasted a big-top tent which could accommodate 6,000 people. It had a collection of 200 horses, 16 elephants and 200 other animals. Dick died at the age of 83 in 1988.

== Jimmy Chipperfield ==
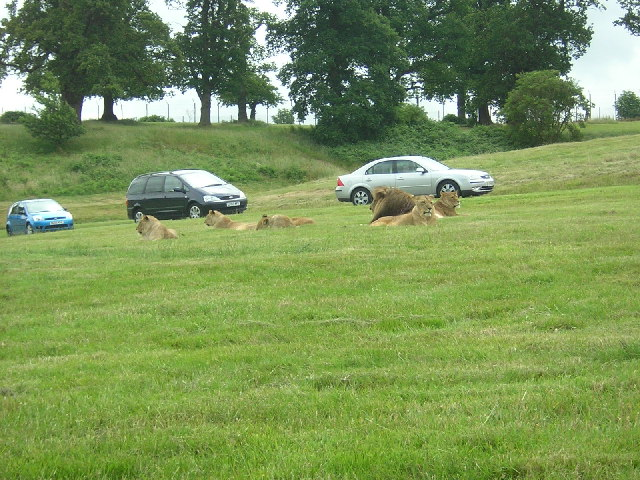
Woburn Safari Park Lion enclosure, that Jimmy Chipperfield helped open in 1970

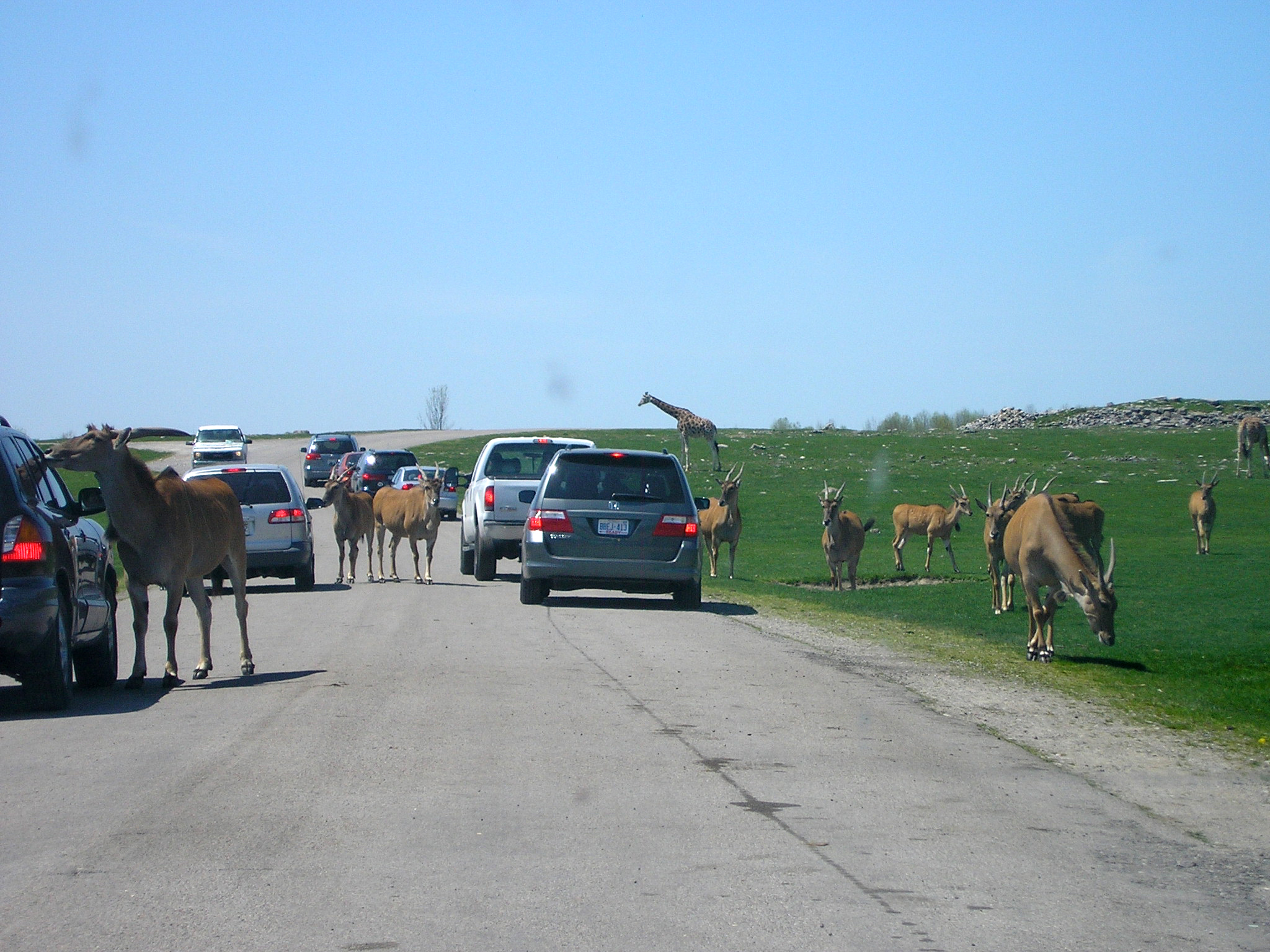
African Lion Safari opened by Dailley and the Chipperfield family on by 22 August 1969 in Hamilton, Ontario, Canada

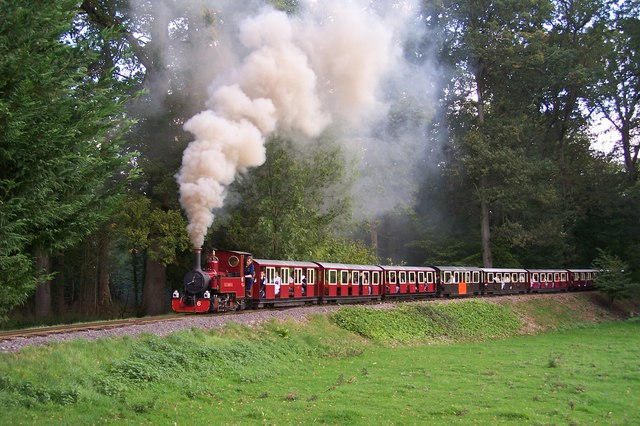
Longleat Safari Park opened by Jimmy Chipperfield in 1966, the first drive-through safari park outside Africa

Jimmy Chipperfield, "James Seaton Methuen Chipperfield" (1912–1990), was born while Chipperfield's Circus was touring. His family owned and performed in the family Circus as clowns, acrobats and the animal trainers. Jimmy learned all the trades of the Circus. Jimmy married Rosie Purchase (1912–2006) in the early 1930s. Rosie's family had a traveling menagerie show of wild animals. After Rosie's father was killed by one of his lions, Jimmy took over the Purchase's show and merged it with the Chipperfield Circus. He took the circus on local and oversea tours. Jimmy began a bear wrestling show. The second world war closed down Jimmy's show. Jimmy signed up to be a fighter pilot for the RAF. After the war he put the show back together and made it bigger and made it shine. By April 1946, the Chipperfield circus had returned to touring the UK. In 1955, Jimmy broke away from the family circus and after a brief time farming and managing other shows, he and daughter Mary began providing animals for film work.

In the 1960s, he started making a career in "drive-through" safari parks. In 1966, he opened the Longleat Safari Park. In 1967, Jimmy opened the Johannesburg Lion Park, the third lion park in the world. Chipperfield had Larenty circus family manage the park. Jimmy opened the Windsor Safari Park in Windsor, Berkshire in 1969. In 1970, he helped to establish the Woburn Safari Park with John Russell, 13th Duke of Bedford and also a park in Stirling, Scotland, the Blair Drummond Safari Park at the Blair Drummond House. In 1971 he helped open the Knowsley Safari Park Jimmy Chipperfield and Annabel Lambton opened the Lambton Lion Park at Lambton Castle in July 1972, closed in 1980. Jimmy opened his West Midland Safari Park on 17 April 1973. The Windsor park closed in 1992 and lions there were moved to the West Midland Safari Park. According to his autobiography, "My Wild Life", he pioneered the entire idea and among his first groups of animals was the lions featured in Born Free. Jimmy provided and trained pets and circus animals for Hollywood movies, like Walt Disney.

Jimmy Chipperfield was a subject of the This Is Your Life in 1961, and a photograph of him with Eamonn Andrews is featured in the collage of photographs on the first edition dust jacket of his autobiography. In 1979 Jimmy open a show called Circus World that toured and set up in the Great Yarmouth Hippodrome.

All four of the Chipperfield siblings, Dick, Jimmy, Marjorie and John who were responsible for the circus's greatest successes are deceased: Marjorie died 1975, John died in 1978 and Jimmy died in 1990.

== Marjorie Chipperfield ==
Marjorie Chipperfield performed as Equestrienne, contortionist and equilibrist. Marjorie Suzanne Phyllis, the younger daughter of Richard Chipperfield was born 12 December 1916. She was the fifth generation of the famous family, sister of Dick, Maude, Jimmy and John. In 1931 she did a bending and balancing act, climbing in and out of the narrow rungs of a ladder. In 1933, with Chipperfield's Lion Show, performed a rolling globe act. She performed with her brother Richard's circus, after he took over the circus from their father in 1937. With the family's circus and the Liberty horses she performed in Eastbourne for the 1938–39 season. For the 1939–40 season she appeared as Mlle Marita, with performing bulls, at the Belle Vue Circus. She appeared as Miss Marjorie doing a balancing and rolling at Poole's (Tom Fossett's) circus in September 1941. She exhibiting shoe horses at Arthur Joel's 'All-British' circus in 1941 and 1942, with her brother Johnny and Rosie (wife of Jimmy) Chipperfield. She also performed on the rolling globe. In 1942 she moved the act to the Reco Brothers' circus and then the Harry Benet's stage circus. She married James (Jimmy) Stockley on 15 December 1945. She performed as Roxana, assisting Marsaline (Bertha Gridneff), on the high wire. Back with Chipperfield's circus she was put as the head of the girls' wardrobe, costumes, etc.

In 1948, she became joint proprietor of Chipperfield's Circus with brothers Richard, James and John Chipperfield. Her elephant ballet was presented at the Kelvin Hall circus, Glasgow in 1948 and 1949. She was the director of Chipperfield's circus in 1951, when their headquarters were at Down farm, Stockbridge, Hampshire, and later when the winter quarters moved to Heythrop, Oxfordshire. She looked after the family's wild animal reserve in South Africa until Jimmy Stockley's death in 1973. She died 11 December 1975, in Cape Town, South Africa. Her daughter Jane Stockley married Brian Boswell.

== James Stockley ==
James (Jimmy) Stockley was a transport, electrics expert and mechanic. He was born at Stoke-on-Trent in 1914. He worked in the motor trade there before the war. In the RAF during the WW2 he flew with Jimmy Chipperfield, as his navigator, and through Jimmy met Marjorie Chipperfield. James was awarded the Distinguished Flying Medal (DFM) for his wartime service. The Award stated: "As pilot and observer respectively, this officer and airman have participated in very many sorties. They have proved themselves to be highly skilled, cool and resolute members of aircraft crew and their keenness for operations has won much praise. One night in March, 1945, they were responsible for the destruction of two enemy aircraft."

James married Marjorie Suzanne Phyllis Chipperfield, on 15 December 1945, at Blaby, Leicestershire. As part of Chipperfield's circus, he kept the post-war show on the road, running. His daughter Carol Elizabeth was christened, at Bristol, in 1950. He was the director of Chipperfield's by 1951, when its headquarters were at Down farm, Stockbridge, In the 1970s, when Chipperfield's circus returned from South Africa, Jim Stockley and his wife Marjorie remained there, running the Natal Lion Park and Game Reserve. James died on 31 May 1973, at the age of 58, following a blow to his chest during the inoculation of a gnu. He was the father of Jane, Carol, James (Jim) junior and Maryann.

== Johnny Chipperfield ==
Johnny Chipperfield (1921–1978) was a rider, clown and animal trainer. John L., was the son of Richard Chipperfield (born 1875) and Maud née Seaton. Johnny Chipperfield was the younger brother of Dick, Maud, Jimmy and Marjorie.

Johnny Chipperfield trained a Welsh pony to do tricks, as a boy, then trained a monkey to jockey on him. At age twelve bought his first ring horse and became a rider and clown with the family show. He spent the 1937 season, with the Chipperfield's animals, on Sweden's Circus Scott, where his riding was encouraged by Rudi Blumenfeld. Johnny married Doris Morche, a member of a German springboard troupe.

During the second world war he served with the RAF. He was demobilized on the day the family circus was due to open, at Southampton for the 1946 season. Johnny Chipperfield is the father of John, Tommy, Doris, Charles (married Keren, in 1988) and Sophie. John worked with the animals and helped manage the Circus. Doris worked with horses. Charles took care of the mechanical machines at the Circus. Sophie performed in a number of acts.

He presented the dogs, performed a comedy ride as 'Madame Spangaletti' and clowned with his brother Jimmy. Noted for his dog act, as 'Kelly', with Chipperfield's Circus, 1938–39. He appeared at the Tom Arnold's Mammoth Circus, Harringay, 1949–50 and 1950–51 seasons, and with Chipperfield's circus, in 1950, exhibiting 'Paul's Peerless Poodles'.

In 1951, he exhibited a high school riding show, at the Southend-on-Sea Kursaal circus. In 1952 he was presented Golden Palaminos, at Chipperfield's circus. His son John jr. was born on 20 July 1953. He was a horse trainer for Chipperfield's circus, from the 1950s on wards, he performed with Doreen Duggan in 1953. He performed with Chipperfield's, in Plymouth in 1954. During the mid-1950s began working with the Chipperfield elephants. He performed with Chipperfield's circus, at the Bingley Hall, Birmingham in 1957–58, exhibiting horses, ponies, elephants and chimpanzees. He accompanied his brother Dick and sister Marjorie to South Africa for the Chipperfield tour of Southern Africa 1965–1967 and returned to the UK 1968. Starting in 1970, he traveled with Chipperfields Circus in the UK training and presenting Asian & African elephants, horses, lions, tigers and dogs. He on died 13 November 1978 from leukaemia.

== Tommy Chipperfield ==
Tommy Chipperfield was born and raised in the Chipperfield's Circus. He grew up on the road with a menagerie of animals, like chimps to giraffes before going to Marsh Court school in Stockbridge, Hampshire. Tommy performed in the Circus as a young boy. Tommy became a big cat trainer, as his father had been. He also undertook elephants and horses shows in the 1970s. Tommy worked for the Roberts brothers for two years. Tommy has worked in the UK and traveled with his show to Spain, South Africa and Australia. He married Marilyn, who he found in Australia. Marilyn has done riding, high wire, trapeze acts and more. The two worked in Ireland in Duffy's Circus for a number of years. In 2013, they moved the show back to England. Their son Thomas Chipperfield, like his grandpa and father, is a lion and tiger trainer.

== Mary Chipperfield ==
Mary Chipperfield (1938 – 2014), Jimmy Chipperfield's daughter, specialised in chimpanzee acts in the 1970s. She was also known as an animal trainer, providing animals for the film Doctor Dolittle (1967) and BBC productions. Mary tamed wild animals for roles in films and Chipperfield's Circus. Mary worked with her father in creating the Longleat Safari Park. In 1999, she was accused of cruel treatment of some animals in her circus. In April 1998, an infant chimpanzee named Trudy had been seized by police and taken to the 'Monkey World' sanctuary after being repeatedly kicked, beaten and made to sleep in a tiny box. Chipperfield was found guilty of twelve counts of cruelty to animals and fined £8,500.

== Sally Chipperfield ==
In 1979, Sally Chipperfield broke off of the Chipperfield Circus, and made her own small show. Sally Chipperfield is the daughter of Richard, Sr., married to Jim Clubb. Sally's show has lions shown by her husband. The show also has Russian Bears. Sally also has a show with dogs, monkeys and a liberty pony act.

== 1980s–2010 ==
In 1980, two Chipperfield's lions found their way onto the grounds of Devizes School in Wiltshire.

Chipperfield Circus, as run by the Dick Chipperfield family, ceased touring in the late 1980s. In the 1989–1990 season, Chipperfield Circus toured Ireland, commencing the season in Cork. The show ran for a few months featuring The Flying Souzas, Shiganio, Peter Althoff and members of the Chipperfield family. In the early 1990s, Charles Chipperfield, a son of Jonny Chipperfield, ran Chipperfield Brothers, but this ceased in the 1990s. The show name rented to Tony Hopkins Promotions for his UK circus tour from 1992 to 1996. The show featured Dick Chipperfield Sr.'s grandson, Richard Chipperfield performing a lion act.

In the 1990s, Graham Chipperfield toured with Ringling-Barnum, showing off three of his elephants: Letchmai, Mina and Camilla. He retired from circus after a Bengal Tiger attacked his brother Richard Chipperfield Jr.

In 2002, it was reported by the BBC that Mary Chipperfield was abusing her animals, leading to a fine for cruelty to animals.

In 2010, Chipperfield Circus returned without animals in the show, appearing at Cambridge and Rochester.

== Charles Chipperfield ==
Charles Chipperfield is the seventh generation of the original Chipperfield family of shows. In 2006, Charles Chipperfield put on a show in Malta, On 15 September 2010, Charles Chipperfield officially incorporated the Charles Chipperfield Circus and run the show with his wife Rebecca Chipperfield. In 2013, the Charles Chipperfield Circus did a show for East Anglia's Children's Hospice at Stonham Barns. In 2013, Frances Middleton performed with the Charles Chipperfield Circus show off aerialist, silks & hoop skills. In 2014, Charles Chipperfield Circus performed at Gorton Park in Manchester. In 2015, the Charles Chipperfield Circus performed in Southport, 25 years after the last Chipperfield Circus performed there. Also in 2015, Charles Chipperfield Circus performed in South Bucks at Odds Farm Park. The 2016 show included flying Trapeze, Foot juggling from Ukraine, from Spain Keyla hula hoops tricks and the Wheel of Death.

== Thomas Chipperfield ==
Thomas Chipperfield, who in 2014 worked with the Peter Jolly's Circus show, most recently made an appearance in Italy as a guest presenter with Moira Orfei in 2016. In April 2018, Chipperfield lost an appeal against a decision by the Department for Environment, Food and Rural Affairs to refuse him a licence to use two lions and a tiger in a travelling circus; he said that he plans a new appeal. He has been called Britain's last lion tamer.

== Other Chipperfield companies ==
- Chipperfield Enterprises trains and supplies lion and tiger acts for circuses worldwide.
- Clubb Chipperfield Ltd. ceased trading under their title in 1998.
- The Chipperfield Organization Ltd is an international animal supply and transport business.

== Other members of the Chipperfield family ==
Sheila Chipperfield (born 17 June 1975, Coventry, England), is the daughter of Dick Chipperfield Sr.'s first cousin, Billy Chipperfield. Sheila was the bassist in the London-based rock band, Elastica from 1996 to 1998.

Jim Stockley is the son of Jimmy & Marjorie Stockley and supplies trained animals to the film industry in South Africa.

Jamie Stockley is the son of Jim Stockley (grandson of Jimmy & Marjorie Stockley) and, together with his wife Dana, runs a successful game reserve and wedding venue in South Africa.

== Books by members of the Chipperfield family ==
- My Friends the Animals, Dick Chipperfield Snr. London: Souvenir Press, 1963
- My Wild Life, Jimmy Chipperfield. London: Macmillan, 1975 ISBN 0-333-18044-5

== Books featuring the Chipperfield family ==
- Paul Gallico Love, Let Me Not Hunger. London: Heinemann, 1963 (novel that briefly mentions Chipperfield's in the first chapter)
- David Jamieson Chipperfield's Circus: an Illustrated History, Aardvark Publishing, 1997
- David Jamieson Mary Chipperfield Circus Book, Jarrold & Sons Ltd., 1979
- Freddie Mills Twenty Years: an autobiography. London: Nicholson & Watson, 1950 (first edition contains photographs taken at Chipperfield's Circus)
- Pamela McGregor Morris Chipperfield's Circus. London: Faber & Faber, 1957
- Edward Seago High Endeavour; illustrated by the author. London: Collins, 1944 (the story of Jimmy Chipperfield's war service as a fighter pilot)
- John Turner A Dictionary of British Circus Biography
  - Vols. 1–2: The Victorian Arena: the Performers. Formby: Lingdales, c1995-2000 ISBN 0-9509084-6-0 ISBN 0950908479
  - Vol. 4: Twentieth Century Circus People, 1901–1950. Formby: Lingdales ISBN 0-9509084-9-5
- J. H. Williams Elephant Bill. London: Rupert Hart-Davis, 1950
- J. H. Williams Big Charlie. London: Rupert Hart-Davis, 1959 (account of a circus elephant)

== See also ==
- African Lion Safari
- Circus
