= Stephen R. L. Clark =

British philosopher (born 1945)

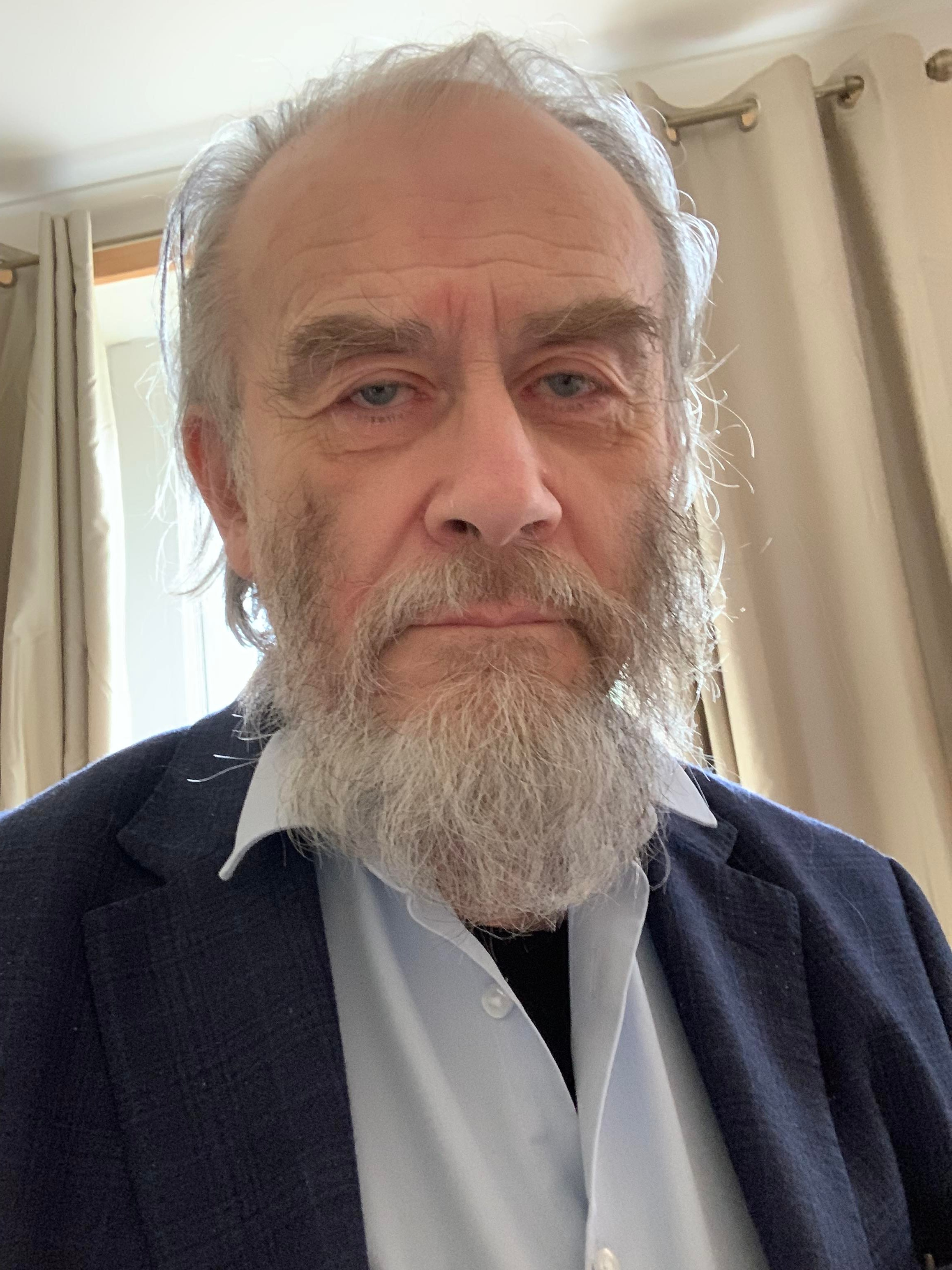
- Clark in 2023
- Born: Stephen Richard Lyster Clark; 30 October 1945 (age 81); Luton, Bedfordshire, England
- Spouse: Gillian Clark
- Children: 3
- Relatives: Samuel Finney (grandfather)

Education
- Education: Balliol College, Oxford (BA, DPhil); All Souls College, Oxford
- Thesis: Speculations upon Aristotelian Anthropology (1973)

Philosophical work
- Institutions: University of Glasgow; University of Liverpool
- Main interests: Animal ethics, philosophy of religion

Stephen Richard Lyster Clark (born 30 October 1945) is an English philosopher and professor emeritus of philosophy at the University of Liverpool. An "anarcho-conservative", Clark specialises in the philosophy of religion and animal rights, writing from a philosophical position that might broadly be described as Christian Platonist. He is the author of twenty books, including The Moral Status of Animals (1977), The Nature of the Beast (1982), Animals and Their Moral Standing (1997), G.K. Chesterton (2006), Philosophical Futures (2011), and Ancient Mediterranean Philosophy (2012), as well as 77 scholarly articles, and chapters in another 109 books. He is a former editor-in-chief of the Journal of Applied Philosophy (1990–2001) and the founder of the PHILOS-L mailing list.

== Education and career ==
Clark was born on 30 October 1945 in Luton, Bedfordshire. His family originally came from Shropshire and Staffordshire. His father, D. A. R. Clark, was an apprentice railway engineer who became a technology teacher, and was later appointed principal of Middlesbrough Technical College, now Teesside University, then principal of Nottingham Technical College, now Nottingham Trent University. His mother, M. K. Clark, was a teacher and the daughter of Samuel Finney. Clark was raised in the Anglican tradition.

After attending Nottingham High School (1956–1964), Clark won a scholarship to Balliol College, Oxford (1964–1968), graduating with a first-class honours degree in greats (classics) in 1968, followed by a fellowship at All Souls (1968–1975). He was awarded his Doctor of Philosophy degree in 1973. Brannon Hancock writes that the philosophers Arthur Prior and Sir Anthony Kenny had a great intellectual influence on Clark at Balliol, while Robin Zaehner was one of his greatest influences at All Souls.

After Oxford, Clark lectured in moral philosophy at the University of Glasgow for nine years, until he was appointed professor of philosophy at Liverpool in 1984. He retired from this post at the end of 2009. Clark has also been a visiting professor at Vanderbilt University and held an Alan Richardson Fellowship at Durham University.

=== Work on animal rights ===
Much of the early part of Clark's work was distinguished by writing and service related to animal ethics. Clark served on the British government's Animal Procedures Committee, a group that advises the Home Secretary on animal testing, from 1998 until 2006. He has also been involved with the Boyd Group, a think tank set up by researchers involved in animal testing, and others who oppose it.

In 1977, Clark authored The Moral Status of Animals. According to a description of the book, "he argues that logical extension of the liberal tradition of sparing animals "unnecessary pain" is sufficient to impose a moral obligation of vegetarianism". Clark's 1982 book The Nature of the Beast: Are Animals Moral? argues that whilst animals may show certain behaviours that appear to be ethical by human standards, animals are not moral because they cannot moralize about themselves or create moral theories.

Clark is credited as one of the earliest researchers to raise the issue of the predation problem in the field of animal ethics.

=== Work on Plotinus ===
Clark's most recent work has focused on Plotinus with Plotinus: Myth, Metaphor and Philosophical Practice (University of Chicago Press, 2016), Plotinus Ennead VI.9: On the Good or the One: Translation with an Introduction and Commentary (Parmenides Press, 2020), and Cities and Thrones and Powers: Towards a Plotinian Politics (Angelico Press: New Hampshire 2022).

== Lectures ==
Clark has delivered a number of well-renowned lectures, including the 1981–1982 Gifford Lectures at the University of Glasgow, entitled "From Athens to Jerusalem", the Stanton Lectures in Philosophy of Religion at the University of Cambridge (1987–1989), and the Wilde Lectures at the University of Oxford (1990). He has also delivered the Scott Holland Lecture at the University of Liverpool (1992), the Aquinas Lecture at the University of Oxford (1994), the Read Tuckwell Lecture at the University of Bristol (1994), the Royal Institute of Philosophy Lecture at Durham University (1995), and the Aquinas Lecture at KU Leuven (2000).

== Personal life ==
Clark is married to Gillian Clark, Professor of Ancient History at the University of Bristol, with whom he has three children. Clark is a Christian vegetarian and sits on the advisory board of the Christian Vegetarian Association.

== Publications ==
=== Books ===
- Aristotle's Man (Clarendon Press, 1975)
- The Moral Status of Animals (Clarendon Press, 1977)
- The Nature of the Beast (Oxford University Press, 1982)
- From Athens to Jerusalem (Clarendon Press, 1984)
- The Mysteries of Religion (Blackwell, 1986)
- (ed.) Berkeley: Money, Obedience and Affection (Garland Press, 1989)
- Civil Peace and Sacred Order (Oxford University Press, 1989)
- A Parliament of Souls (Oxford University Press, 1990)
- God's World and the Great Awakening (Oxford University Press, 1991)
- How to Think about the Earth (Mowbrays, 1993)
- How to Live Forever (Routledge, 1995)
- Animals and their Moral Standing (Routledge, 1997)
- God, Religion and Reality (Society for Promoting Christian Knowledge, 1998)
- The Political Animal (Routledge, 1999)
- Biology and Christian Ethics (Cambridge University Press, 2000)
- G.K. Chesterton: Thinking Backwards, Looking Forwards (Templeton, 2006)
- Understanding Faith (Imprint Academic, 2009)
- with Panayiota Vassilopoulou (eds.). Late Antique Epistemology: Other Ways to Truth (Macmillan, 2009)
- Philosophical Futures (Peter Lang, 2011)
- Ancient Mediterranean Philosophy (Continuum, 2012).
- Plotinus: myth, metaphor and philosophical practice (University of Chicago Press, 2016).
- Can We Believe in People? Human Significance in an Interconnected Cosmos (Brooklyn, NY: Angelico, 2020)
- Plotinus: Ennead VI.9: translation and commentary (Parmenides Press, 2020).
- Cities and Thrones and Powers: towards a Plotinian Politics (Angelico Press: New Hampshire 2022)
- How the Worlds Became: philosophy and the oldest stories (Angelico Press: New Hampshire, 2023).
- Other Lives and Other Worlds: philosophy and modern fictions (Angelico Press: New Hampshire, 2025).

=== Selected book chapters ===
- "The Pretext of 'Necessary Suffering'", in Clark, Stephen R.L. The Moral Status of Animals (Clarendon Press, 1977)
- "Good Dogs and Other Animals", in Peter Singer (ed.). In Defense of Animals (Basil Blackwell, 1985)
- "Is Humanity a Natural Kind?" in T. Ingold (ed.). What is an Animal? (Unwin Hyman 1988).
- "The Consciousness of Animals," in R. Tallis & H. Robinson (eds.). The Pursuit of Mind (Carcanet Press 1991)
- "How many Selves make me?," D. Cockburn (ed.) Human Beings (Cambridge University Press 1991)
- "Apes and the Idea of Kindred", in Paola Cavalieri and Peter Singer (eds.). The Great Ape Project (St. Martin's Griffin, 1993)
- "Species-essentialism," in Marc Bekoff (ed.) Encyclopedia of Animal Rights and Animal Welfare (Greenwood Press, 1998)
- "Impersonal Minds," in Anthony O'Hear (eds.). Minds and Persons (Cambridge University Press, 2003)
- "Vegetarianism and the Ethics of Virtue," in Steve F. Sapontzis (ed.). Food for Thought: The Debate Over Eating Meat (Prometheus Books, 2004)
- "Ethical Thought in India," in John Skorupski (ed.). Routledge Companion to Ethics (Routledge, 2010)
- "Animals in Classical and Late Antique Philosophy," in Raymond Frey & Tom Beauchamp (eds.). Oxford Handbook of Animal Ethics (Oxford University Press, 2011)

=== Selected papers ===
- "Animal Wrongs", Analysis, Vol. 38, No. 3 (Jun. 1978), pp. 147–149
- "The Rights of Wild Things", Inquiry, vol, 22 (1979), pp. 171–188.
- "On Wishing There Were Unicorns", Proceedings of the Aristotelian Society, New Series, Vol. 90, (1989–1990), pp. 247–265
- "Orwell and the Anti-Realists", Philosophy, Vol. 67, No. 260 (Apr. 1992), pp. 141–154
- "Deference, Degree and Selfhood", Philosophy, Vol. 80, No. 312 (Apr. 2005), pp. 249–260

== See also ==
- List of animal rights advocates
