= Nico (gorilla) =

Western lowland gorilla

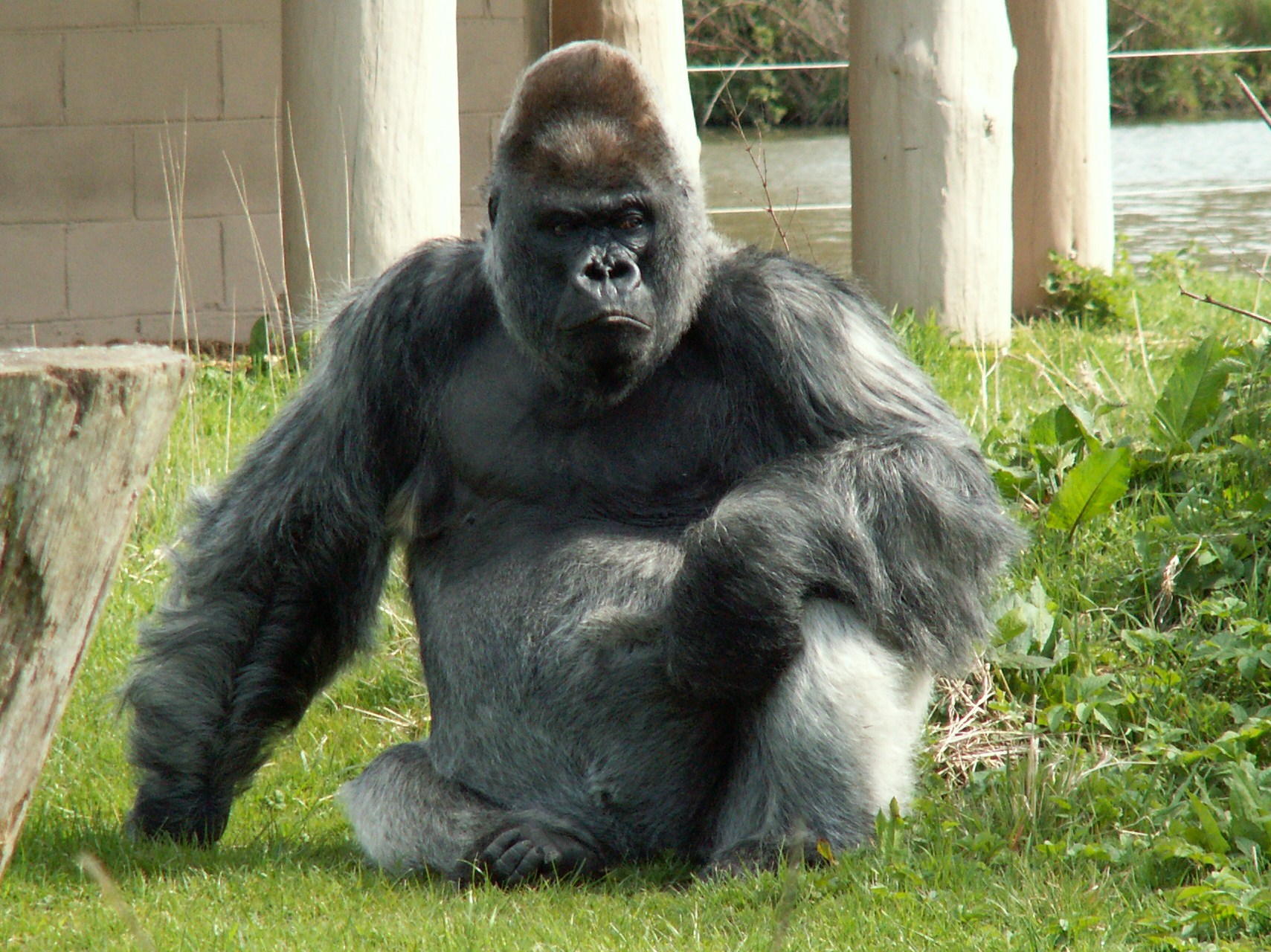
- Nico in 2008
- Species: Western lowland gorilla
- Sex: Male
- Born: July 1961
- Died: January 7, 2018 (aged 56); Longleat Safari Park
- Residence: Longleat Safari Park
- Weight: 170 kg (370 lb)
- Height: 5 ft 10 in (1.78 m)

Nico (July 1961 – 7 January 2018) was a western lowland gorilla who lived in captivity at Longleat Safari Park, Wiltshire, UK. He was one of the longest lived gorillas in captivity.

== Life ==
Nico and his partner Samba came from a zoo in Switzerland in the 1980s, and were given a television to watch during their six-month quarantine period. Nico's habitat on Half Mile Lake at Longleat covered over half an acre and included lookout stations, tree trunk climbing frames and tyre and net swings.

== Death ==
Longleat Safari announced Nico's death on 8 January 2018, at the time of his death, at 56 years old, he was the third oldest Western lowland gorilla in Europe and was thought to be the fifth oldest gorilla in the world, and the second oldest in the UK behind Babydoll. In an official statement on their social media channels the safari park stated:

"It is with deep regret and huge sadness that we have to announce the death of Nico, our much-loved western lowland gorilla. Nico, who was one of the oldest silverback gorillas in the world, died in his sleep on 7 January 2018. Everyone here has been truly saddened by the death of Nico. His main keeper has been working with Nico virtually on a daily basis since 1989 and has forged an extraordinarily close bond with him. It goes without saying that he is particularly devastated by the loss along with the rest of his keeping team who have cared for Nico over the years."

== See also ==
- List of individual apes
