= PHILOS-L =

Mailing list

PHILOS-L is an international electronic mailing list whose purpose is to facilitate the exchange of information about employment, publications, conferences, and meetings in the field of philosophy. The list is based at the University of Liverpool, has over 15,000 subscribers in over 60 countries and uses LISTSERV software. The archives of PHILOS-L are available online and extend from its creation in 1989 to the present. The founder is Stephen R.L. Clark.
