= Mary Chipperfield =

British circus entertainer (1937–2014)

Mary Rose Cawley (née Chipperfield, 26 November 1937 – 30 November 2014) was a British circus entertainer who specialised in a chimpanzee act. She was also known as an animal trainer, providing numerous animals for various BBC productions and the 1967 movie Doctor Dolittle. She was later convicted on several counts of animal cruelty.

== Early life ==
She was born on 26 November 1937, in a circus caravan in Kentish Town, London to Jimmy Chipperfield and his wife Rose (née Purchase; 1912–2006). The Purchase family had a long history of travelling menageries, and Rose had a lion act herself. The two shows amalgamated about two years after the couple married in 1935. Chipperfield's Circus was managed by Jimmy's father at the time and control later passed to his older brother. In 1955 her father broke away from the family circus and, after a brief spell at farming and managing other shows, he and Mary began providing animals for film work.

== Career ==
=== Southampton Zoo ===
In 1961, her father founded Southampton Zoological Gardens on Southampton Common and Mary used this as a base for taming a variety of wild animals for roles in films and Chipperfield's Circus.

=== Longleat ===
In the 1960s, her father began to develop drive-through safari parks. Mary and her husband Richard Cawley were actively involved in the creation of the Longleat Safari Park. Mary wrote about its creation and first year of public operation in Lions on the Lawn (1971).

=== Christmas shows in the 1970s ===
Just as the BBC showed Billy Smart's Circus shows on Christmas Day for several years during the 1970s, ITV would show Chipperfield's Circus in competition. This brought Mary even more into the public eye and she was featured in magazine articles and features such as a photospread in Princess Tina Annual 1971.

=== The Beast of Bodmin Moor ===
In 1978, the Plymouth Zoo, then owned by Chipperfield, was forced to close due to economic difficulties, and she arranged to transfer five of her pumas to the nearby Dartmoor Wildlife Park, now Dartmoor Zoo. However three of them, which included a breeding pair, were very dear to her, and when the cage arrived it was found to contain only two pumas, together with the tags of the other three. Chipperfield said that the three had escaped, but she later broke down and said she had released the three onto the moor, rather than give them up to another home. However, 38 years later, and two years after her death, Roger Cawley, her widower, denied these claims. Nonetheless, the famous legend of the Beast of Bodmin began almost at once after the alleged release in 1978, and has persisted with occasional reported sightings ever since.

== Conviction for animal cruelty ==
In 1999, Mary Chipperfield was accused of cruel treatment of some animals in her circus. In April 1998, an infant chimpanzee named Trudy had been seized by police and taken to the 'Monkey World' sanctuary after being repeatedly kicked, beaten and made to sleep in a tiny box. Chipperfield was found guilty of twelve counts of cruelty to animals and fined £8,500. Many campaigners - including Animal Defenders, who brought her mistreatment of animals to the High Court - believed that the sentence was far too lenient and that Chipperfield should have been jailed and banned from keeping animals for life.

== Personal life and death ==
Chipperfield was married to Roger Cawley. She died on 30 November 2014, aged 77.
