= Lord Dowding Fund for Humane Research =

British anti-vivisection organisation

Lord Dowding Fund for Humane Research (LDF)
- Named after: Lord Dowding
- Formation: 1974; 52 years ago
- Location: London, England
- Parent organization: National Anti-Vivisection Society
- Website: www.ldf.org.uk

The Lord Dowding Fund for Humane Research (LDF) – a department of the National Anti-Vivisection Society, the world's first anti-vivisection organisation – awards grants to scientists undertaking medical research which benefits humans, without the use of animals.

Founded in 1974, the name of the Fund is in honour of the Battle of Britain's Air Chief Marshal the Lord Dowding, a past President of the National Anti-Vivisection Society.

To date, the Fund has awarded grants approaching £2 million to researchers working in a wide range of research fields including microsurgery, toxicity testing of dental fillings, breast and lung cancer, product safety testing, Parkinson's disease, schizophrenia, cot deaths, cataracts, kidney research, cell culture, computer-aided drug design, biotechnology, brain damage and computer teaching packages which replace the use of animals in education of students at school and university level.

LDF grant around £300,000 per year for projects which show that medical progress is possible without the use of animals. LDF recognises that modern research techniques offer superior replacements to animal procedures. The major advantage is that, without the use of animals, there are no problems of species differences; the results can be directly applied to the human condition. LDF therefore aims to:

- Support and fund better methods of scientific and medical research for testing products and curing disease which replace the use of animals.
- Fund areas of fundamental research which lead to the adoption of non-animal research methodology.
- Fund, promote and assist medical, surgical, and scientific research, learning, and educational training and processes for the purpose of replacing animals in education and training
- Promote and assist any research for the purpose of showing that animal research is harmful or unnecessary to humanity.

The LDF publishes a magazine New Science, exploring the latest developments in the world of research without animals, as well as featuring reports on the research they fund.

They are also a member of Focus on Alternatives, a coalition established in 1998 for organizations funding non-animal scientific and medical research to work together.

Studying neurological disorders

The LDF has committed funding until the end of the decade towards running costs of the functional Magnetic Resonance Images (fMRI) scanning facility at Aston University. The fMRI scanner is twice as powerful as those found in hospitals, so allows detailed study of the human brain. Whilst animal researchers study neurological disorders in primates, this facility shows that it is better to use non-invasive methods to study people; results are more reliable and avoid the potentially catastrophic consequences of species differences.

Aston was the first site in the UK to marry both MEG (employing the UK's only whole-head Magnetoencephalography system) and fMRI, putting the Academy of Life Sciences at the forefront of world scientific endeavour. fMRI can be combined with MEG scanning to increase understanding of the human brain by enabling researchers to clearly track, in human volunteers, not just which areas of the brain are active, but when.

Unlocking the secrets of human neurotoxicity

In another department at Aston University, the LDF is supporting the work of Dr Michael Coleman to develop new methods for studying neurotoxicity. Neurotoxicity, or nerve toxicity, is a potential side-effect of new drugs. By studying which substances cause neurotoxicity and why, we can gain clues about illnesses such as Alzheimer's, Parkinson's and Motor Neurone Disease.

Most neurotoxicity research is carried out on some two million rodents and over 10,000 primates every year but the LDF is supporting research using human brain cells grown in culture. So far, Dr Coleman and his team have focused on creating a model for a group of cells known as the astrocytes – human brain cells which protect nerves in the CNS from toxins or injury. These cells may play a crucial role in neurodegenerative disease but there has been no model on which to perform tests – but this may be about to change. Dr Coleman's team has identified three human cell lines which might act as a suitable model for the astrocytes – in preliminary tests all behave similarly to astrocytes.

Tackling a hospital killer

Over the past 20 years, Multiple Organ Dysfunction Syndrome, or MODS, has emerged as a leading cause of death among critically ill patients in intensive care units. Triggered by an excessive and uncontrolled response to illness or injury, MODS causes organs to dysfunction gradually over a period of weeks or even days. Of those affected, 90% of adults and 54% of children die.

Conventional MODS research has entailed forcing rats and mice to endure this excruciating disease. However, the LDF is supporting the development of a technique that makes use of artificially grown human tissue.

Dr Karl Wooldridge, of the University of Nottingham, and his team have created an artificial human Blood Brain Barrier – a defence mechanism set up by blood vessels to protect the brain. They have subjected this to known MODS-causing organisms, to study how the disease takes hold and develops.

Replacements for animals in education for China & India

Computer simulations by Professor David Dewhurst with LDF funding have saved tens of thousands of animals from being used in education every year in the UK alone. The simulations replace the animals in university science practicals.

The LDF is currently supporting the development of these programmes to enable teachers to assemble their own teaching materials on-line. This will include upgrades of existing tools and programmes in different languages.
