= Animal Defenders International =

- Founded: 1990
- Founder: Jan Creamer (co-founder)
- Location: Los Angeles
- Key people: Chief Executive Jan Creamer
- Website: www.ad-international.org

Animal Defenders International (ADI), founded 1990, has offices in US, UK, Colombia, Peru and South Africa; it actuates education and public awareness campaigns to protect animals in captivity and wild animals and their environments. ADI's campaigns focus on animals used in entertainment, sport, for clothing; illegal wildlife trade; and replacement of animals used in research and testing. ADI collaborates with governments on large-scale international rescues of wild animals following legislation to end animal circuses, illegal animal trafficking. ADI owns and operates the ADI Wildlife Sanctuary, South Africa, home to nearly 40 ex-circus lions and tigers from Peru, Colombia and Guatemala.

== Animals in entertainment ==
Stop Circus Suffering is ADI's global campaign against the use of animals in circuses. ADI, through country-specific investigations, has contributed to the passing of animal rights laws, with Bolivia passing a law to ban both wild and domestic animal acts in all circuses; and similar legislation under consideration in Colombia and Peru.

In the UK, ADI is lobbying the Department for the Environment, Food and Rural Affairs to introduce a ban on the use of "certain non-domesticated animals” in traveling circuses in line with DEFRA's 2006 promise to introduce an Act.

ADI's investigation into the use of animals in circuses in the UK and Europe in 1998, resulting in the first-ever footage of behind-the-scenes abuse of circus animals, resulted in the prosecution of international animal trainer (and Hollywood animal supplier) Mary Chipperfield, her husband Roger Cawley and their elephant keeper 'Steve' Gills. Chipperfield was filmed beating a baby chimpanzee, whilst Cawley and Gills were filmed beating elephants at their headquarters in Hampshire, England. This resulted in the collapse of the UK animal circus industry, and a wholescale move over to human-only circuses. Only a few circuses remained with wild animals.

The Stop Circus Suffering campaign is also active across Europe (Greece, Ireland, Portugal and Norway), and the US.

In 2008, ADI released the findings of an undercover investigation of nine US circuses, and exposed the beatings of elephants by trainer Mike Swain, at Bailey Brothers Circus. The USDA contacted Swain but took no further action. ADI is pursuing this.

After a long campaign, in 2002 CITES (Conference of Parties to the Convention on International Trade in Endangered Species) introduced new regulations for live traveling exhibitions introducing a 'passport style' system. ADI first pressed for this tightening up of the rules on circuses in 1997, after exposing a circus in Africa as an animal trafficking front.

As well as its major campaigning activities on animal circuses, ADI also campaigns against the use of animals in advertising, television, films and video. Companies dropping advertising campaigns featuring animals include Toyota, Bombay Sapphire Gin, GMB Union and Careerbuilder.

For ADI's My Mate's a Primate campaign – which highlights the threats and exploitation of primates as a result of the bushmeat trade, in entertainment, the pet trade and in experiments – a TV advert was produced in which a young actress highlighted the suffering of chimpanzees in advertising. In the UK, the advert was banned on the grounds that it was "political". ADI's challenge against the ban – which prevents advertising by animal, environmental and human rights organizations – has now moved to the European Court of Human Rights.

In 2011 ADI contacted American Humane Association (AHA), asking them to re-evaluate how they assess the use of animals in films and the statements being made which effectively endorse the use of performing animals. This action came after ADI made accusations that Tai, the elephant star of the film Water For Elephants, was abused prior to the movie, with AHA giving the film their "No Animals Were Harmed” in the making certification.

== Chipperfield case ==
Before the successful prosecutions of the elephant keeper and two directors, Mary Chipperfield Promotions Ltd was one of Europe's largest suppliers of animals for TV, advertising, movies, zoos, and circuses. From autumn 1997 to early 1998 ADI Field Officers worked undercover at Mary Chipperfield Promotions (MCP) in Hampshire, UK. This was the final assignment in an 18-month investigation. They recorded evidence of elephants, camels, and a baby chimpanzee being beaten. The chimp, Trudy, was seen being kicked, screamed at, and thrashed with a stick by the international trainer, Mary Chipperfield.

In 1998, ADI issued multiple summonses for cruelty against Mary Chipperfield Promotions Ltd., the MCP elephant keeper Steve Gills, Mary Chipperfield (née Cawley), and Roger Cawley and later that year Gills was convicted on multiple counts of cruelty and jailed because of his sustained and repeated attacks on the elephants in his care.

In 1999, the trial of Mary Chipperfield and Roger Cawley began. At the end of the trial, Mary Chipperfield was convicted of 13 counts of cruelty to the chimpanzee Trudy and Roger Cawley (at the time a government zoo inspector) was convicted of cruelty to an elephant called Flora.

The Mary Chipperfield trial remains the defining legal case in circus campaigning around the world. The video helped to prompt legislation on animal circuses, as well as local bans on animal use were introduced in many countries in Asia, Central and South America, the US, Canada, and several European countries.

Some of the animals that featured in the trial disappeared; only Trudy was rescued. Chipperfield sold her farm in Hampshire, England, and moved to Spain. ADI continues to monitor her appearances in European circuses, as well as those of other Chipperfield family members.

== Animal rescues ==
Toto

In September 2003, Toto, a circus chimpanzee, was rescued by ADI from a circus in Chile, and transported 7,000 miles to the world-renowned chimpanzee sanctuary, Chimfunshi Wildlife Orphanage in Northern Zambia.

Twenty-seven-year-old Toto was taken from the wild in Africa when aged 2–3 years old. Toto is believed to have been purchased in the US by Chile's Circus Konig, along with three other baby chimpanzees. The other three died, leaving Toto alone with the circus for at least twenty years. Toto was chained by the neck, and his act involved dressing up in human clothes, smoking cigarettes and drinking tea. He lived in a tiny wooden packing crate little more than a metre wide, with bars on the front.

Entire circus seized in Mozambique

In an international rescue mission, ADI secured every animal from the Akef Egyptian Circus, stationed in Maputo, Mozambique. This was the first time such a broad-based rescue had ever taken place. The animals – six lions, three tigers, one African rock python, three horses (a mare and her very young foal, plus a stallion), and seven dogs – had been abandoned.

The Mozambique government confiscated all of the animals and placed them in the care of ADI. The python, tigers and lions were confiscated for CITES and import permit contraventions, in addition to welfare reasons. The horses were rehomed in Mozambique and the lions, tigers, pythons and dogs were moved to South Africa where they spent some time in quarantine whilst waiting for a permanent home.

Murphy the python could not be released and went to a protected enclosure at Fitzsimons Snake Park in South Africa. Three of the lions, from the extinct-listed Barbary sub-species, lived at the Hoedspruit Endangered Species Centre until they died of old age a decade later.

The other three lions were placed with the Moholoholo Wildlife Rehabilitation Centre, by 2009, one remains to a fit and healthy old age, the others having succumbed to the passage of time. The tigers were rehomed with the Milimani Game Lodge. After about eight years, their home was lost in a land claim and ADI retrieved and relocated them to live at Hoesdpruit, where they spent the remainder of their lives.

Tarzan, Sarah and Caesar

In 2007 ADI rescued two lions, Sarah and Caesar, and a tiger, Tarzan, from Circo Universal in Portugal. Having been spotted by an ADI Field Officer in 2006, the animals appeared to be abandoned but were in fact off the road due to lack of funds. The Portuguese authorities seized the animals, who were held at Lisbon Zoo before they were handed over to ADI, which then arranged for them to be moved to their rescue centre in South Africa, where they remain.

Peru: Spirit of Freedom

In 2014, ADI traveled to Peru for their largest animal rescue operation called Operation Spirit of Freedom. ADI took custody of 24 lions from circuses in Peru and 9 in Colombia, a Tiger named Hoover, a spectacled bear named Cholita and a mountain lion named Mufasa.

== Animal experiments ==
The Save The Primates campaign was launched in 2009, in an attempt to expose the global primate trade across three continents, including one of Europe's largest testing facilities – Huntingdon Life Sciences in Cambridgeshire.

Their investigations revealed owl monkeys were taken from the rainforest for malaria experiments in Colombia, monkeys in rusting, collapsing cages at a Home Office-approved monkey supplier in Vietnam and, in the UK, primates in commercial testing were caught on film at Huntingdon Life Sciences in Cambridgeshire, a major contract testing operation for multi-national product brands which can hold up to 550 monkeys at a time. During the one-year ADI undercover investigation, 217 monkeys were killed in five studies, which included struggling monkeys being strapped into chairs and forced to inhale products.

In September 2007, the European Parliament adopted a Declaration co-originated by ADI calling for bans on the use of wild-caught primates and great apes, along with a timetable for phasing out the use of all primates in experiments. 55% of MEPs signed the Declaration, making it the most supported on an animal protection matter ever.

In November 2008, the European Commission published its proposal for a new Directive on animal testing, replacing Directive 86/609/EEC. It included a requirement for prior authorisation for all animal experiments, the 3Rs (replacement, reduction, refinement) as a cornerstone of the legislation with particular emphasis on replacement, ethical reviews, a licensing system for suppliers, establishments and individuals using animals, an upper limit of pain, uniform implementation of Council of Europe standards of housing, the extension of the scope of the Directive to some invertebrate species and foetal animals, and other measures. However, there were also shortcomings. Notably, bans on the use of great apes and endangered species contained loopholes and exemptions.

The Directive will now go to the Council of Ministers, where every Member State will have its say on the Commission's proposal and on the European Parliament's amendments. The Directive can only be adopted if both the Council and the Parliament agree on the same text. The Commission would play an important conciliatory role if the two institutions were to disagree.

== See also ==
- Animal welfare in the United Kingdom
