= Longleat Safari and Adventure Park =

Safari park in Wiltshire, England

Longleat Safari Park
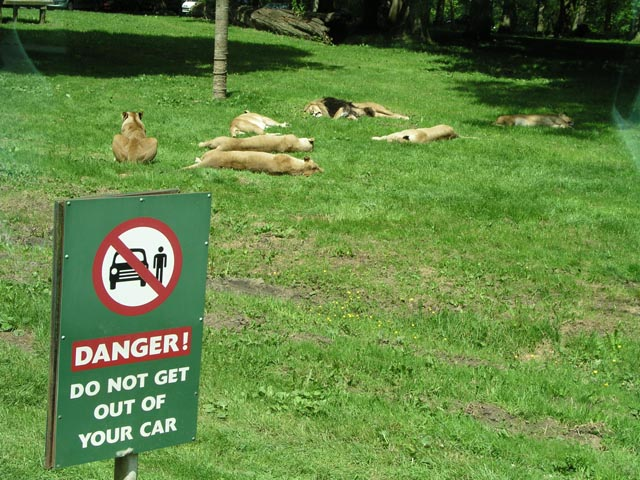
- Longleat Safari Park's lion reserve, with a warning sign

- Location within Wiltshire
- Type: Safari park
- Location: Longleat, Wiltshire
- OS grid: ST818434
- Coordinates: 51.19°N 2.261°W
- Area: 9,000 acres (36.42 km^{2})
- Created: 1966
- Visitors: 790,533 (in 2025)
- Camp sites: Yes
- Website: www.longleat.co.uk

Longleat Safari and Adventure Park in Longleat, Wiltshire, England, was opened in 1966 as the world's first drive-through safari park outside Africa. It is in the grounds of Longleat House, the home of the 8th Marquess of Bath. In addition to the main house, attractions include a Safari Park and the Longleat Railway.

The Safari Park features an East African Reserve, a Jungle Cruise, a Monkey Temple, a reserve for Giant otters and crocodiles, an Animal Adventure area and a place known as Koala Creek. Longleat Safari and Adventure Park has also featured in the media with four documentaries about the attraction.

== History ==
The park is in the grounds of Longleat House, a stately home which is open to the public and is the home of the 8th Marquess of Bath. Longleat Safari Park and the concept of safari parks were the brainchild of Jimmy Chipperfield (1912–1990), former co-director of Chipperfield's Circus.

== Description ==
=== Longleat house and grounds ===
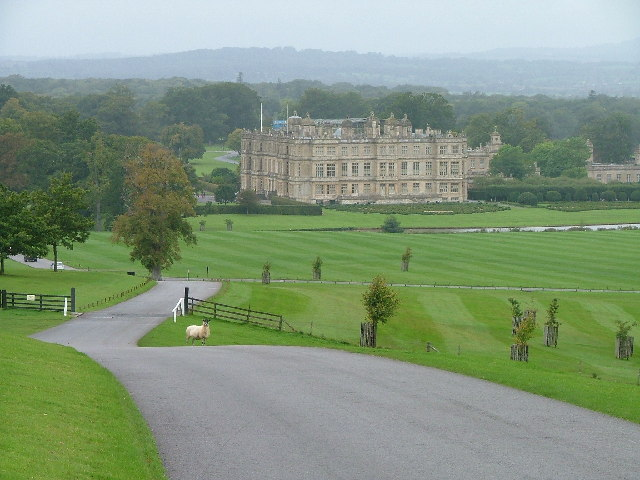
The Longleat home

Opened to the public in 1949, the house is the ancestral home of the Marquess of Bath.

=== Safari Park ===
==== East African Reserve ====
The East African Reserve, which contains Rothschild's giraffes, Grant's zebras, ostriches, black wildebeest, South American tapirs, African spurred tortoises, ring-tailed lemurs, American Pygmy goats, Somali sheep, Cameroon sheep and, since 2022, a male capybara and a separate enclosure for a male common warthog. The whole reserve extends to 60 acres (24 ha).

==== Jungle Cruise ====
The Jungle Cruise (known as the Safari Boat until 2011) is a short trip around Half Mile Lake. The journey takes visitors past an island, which was a former home to the elderly male western lowland gorilla Nico, the oldest gorilla in Europe, until his death aged 56 on 7 January 2018. The island is now home to black-and-white colobus monkeys. The journey then takes you to the new Hippo House built in 2025.

==== Monkey Temple ====
Opened in 2012, the centrepiece of this attraction is a large themed ruin with long rope walkways running across the paths, which allows visitors to safely interact with a variety of marmosets and tamarins.

==== Giant otters and crocodiles ====
Branching off from Monkey Temple, this attraction opened in 2019. Previously the enclosure was home to a colony of captive-bred Humboldt penguins which were first displayed in 2013, but there were several outbreaks of avian malaria in September 2016 and December 2018.

==== Animal Adventure ====
Animal Adventure rabbit

Containing many animals previously kept in Pets' Corner, this area which contains many exotic and familiar mammals, birds, reptiles and insects opened in 2009.

==== Koala Creek ====
Opened in 2019, Koala Creek is the newest addition to the park with koalas from Adelaide, South Australia. Longleat Safari Park is the only place in England where visitors can see the creatures and the only place in Europe that houses southern koalas. In 2022, Longleat welcomed the birth of a southern koala joey. It is the first of its kind to be born in Europe.

=== Longleat Railway ===
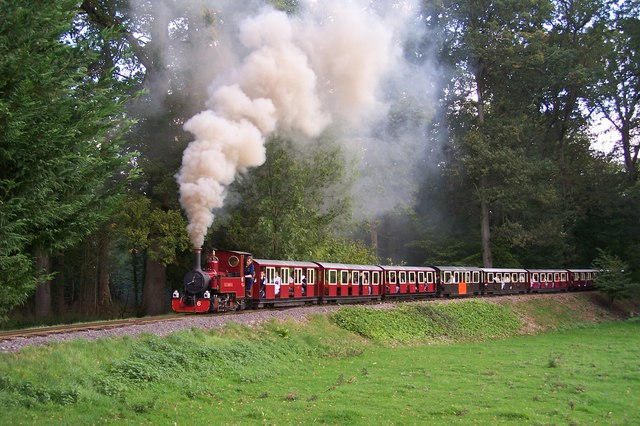
Longleat Railway no. 6 John Hayton in 2006

Established in 1965 and expanded in 1976, this 15 in (381 mm) gauge ridable miniature railway is among the busiest in the country. It has a length of 1 1/4 miles (2 kilometres) through scenic woodland and along the edge of Half Mile Lake. The line has taken several different courses across the years, but the route along the lake has remained consistent. After opening the railway was originally run by outside company Minirail on a ten-year contract, which was not renewed due to disagreements between the two companies. Following this, Longleat took over running the railway in 1976. Many engines have run on the railway over the years, both steam and diesel; as of 2018 the railway owns three diesel locomotives. The railway also has 15 carriages, all built at Longleat between 1976 and 2013 and wearing mock British Railways crimson and cream livery, along with several permanent way wagons. Between 2011 and 2017 the railway was known as the Jungle Express, with the station and carriages given additional theming.

==== Current locomotives ====
Number	Name	Wheel arrangement	Builders	Year built	Livery	Notes
7	Flynn	0-6-0DM	Alan Keef	2007	Crimson	Named after the son of Lady Lenka Thynn; Used on secondary duties
8	John Thynn	Bo-Bo	Alan Keef	2018	Crimson	Named after the eldest son of the 8th Marquess; Used on primary passenger duties
9	Henry Thynn	Bo-Bo	Alan Keef	2021	Crimson	Named after the younger son of the 8th Marquess; Twin locomotive of no. 8

==== Former locomotives ====
Number	Name	Wheel arrangement	Builders	Year built	Livery	Notes
1	Lenka	4+4wDH	Severn Lamb	1973	Maroon	Named after Lady Lenka Thynn; Sold to Oakwood Theme Park in 1985; Name transferred to Longleat Railway no. 4
3	Dougal	0-6-2T	Severn Lamb	1970	Crimson	Sold to Evesham Vale Light Railway in 2005
4	Lenka	4+4wDH	Longleat Railway	1984	BR Crimson & Cream	Only engine built by Longleat; Railcar capable of carrying 12 passengers; Sold to private owner in 2017
5	Ceawlin	0-8-2DH	Severn Lamb	1975	GWR Green	Named after the 8th Marquess of Bath; Steam outline locomotive, rebuilt in 1989; Formerly LR no. 2 before its rebuild; Loaned to Cleethorpes Coast Light Railway in 2019, sold to the railway in 2020
6	John Hayton	0-6-2T	Exmoor Steam Railway	2004	Crimson	Named after the railway's former manager; Sold to the Perrygrove Railway in 2015; Has since been overhauled and renamed 'Anne'

== In the media ==
- The Lions of Longleat – 1967 BBC1 documentary about the newly opened safari park with commentary by Lord Bath and Jimmy Chipperfield.
- Lion Country – 55-part documentary series broadcast on BBC One in 1998.
- Animal Park – BBC documentary series, broadcast almost every year since 2000.
- Inside Longleat – channel 5 documentary series, with two series.

== See also ==
- Anne (elephant), lives at Longleat
- List of zoos by country
