= OneKind =

Scottish animal welfare charity

- Founded: 1911
- Founder: Netta and Elizabeth Ivory
- Type: Registered charity no. SC041299
- Purpose: Advancing animal welfare
- Location: Edinburgh, Scotland
- Employees: 6
- Volunteers: 80
- Website: www.onekind.org

OneKind is a campaigning animal welfare charity based in Edinburgh and operating in Scotland, UK, and as part of the Eurogroup for Animals. OneKind exists to end cruelty to all animals and improve their lives.

== Background ==
The organisation was founded as the Scottish Society for the Prevention of Vivisection, in 1911 by Netta and Elizabeth Ivory. During this time the organisation was a branch of the National Anti-Vivisection Society. The Society published the magazine Our Fellow Mortals from 1911 to 1925 which was edited by Louisa Lumsden.

It continues to work towards an end to animal experimentation but in the 1950s expanded to include protection of all types of animal. It was renamed Advocates for Animals in 1990, as part of a rebranding campaign that included a new logo, but officially became known as OneKind in 2010.

== Wild animal welfare ==
In 2011, OneKind set up the SnareWatch website to document the extent of animal snaring in the UK.

Another issue OneKind works on is calling for an end to the killing of wildlife on grouse moors and elsewhere in Scotland.

== Farmed animal welfare ==
OneKind promotes compassionate dietary choices and works to improve the lives of farmed animals by campaigning to end practices such as the caging of farmed animals, and intensive animal farming.

== Companion animal welfare ==
In 2025 OneKind launched a campaign calling on the Scottish Government to put an end to the suffering of wild animals in homes.
