= National Anti-Vivisection Society =

British animal protection organization

- Abbreviation: NAVS
- Founded: 1875
- Type: Non-profit
- Purpose: Animal protection, animal welfare
- Location: London
- Region served: United Kingdom
- Chief executive: Jan Creamer
- Website: navs.org.uk

The National Anti-Vivisection Society (NAVS) is a British non-profit animal protection group, based in London, working to end animal testing, and focused on the replacement of animals in research with advanced, scientific techniques. Since 2006, the NAVS has operated its international campaigns under the working name Animal Defenders International (ADI), and the two groups now work together under the ADI name.

== History ==
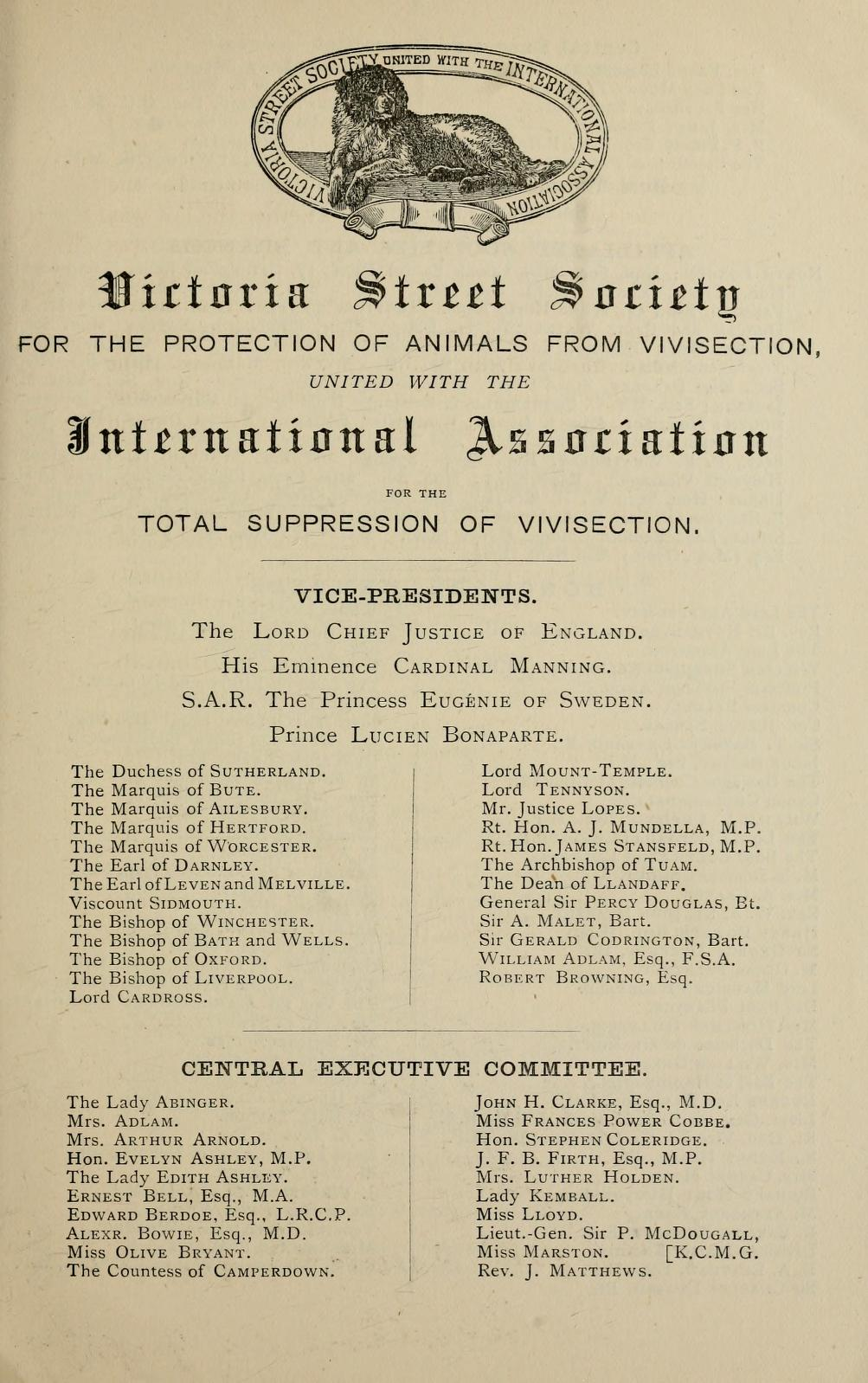
Victoria Street Society for the Protection of Animals from Vivisection, 1885

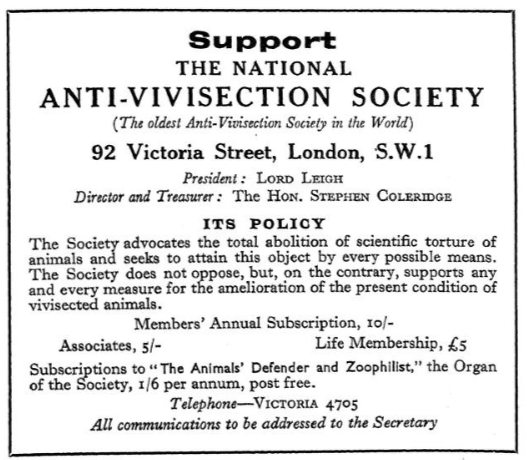
National Anti-Vivisection Society advert, 1935

The NAVS of the UK is the world's first anti-vivisection organisation, founded in 1875 by Frances Power Cobbe, a humanitarian who authored articles and leaflets opposing animal experiments. The Society was formed on 2 December 1875 in Victoria Street, London, under the name of the Victoria Street Society for the Protection of Animals from Vivisection. (Note: Some modern academic references refer to it as the Victoria Street Society for the Protection of Animals Liable to Vivisection) Other founding members were the physician George Hoggan, journalist Richard Holt Hutton and clergyman Henry Edward Manning. The Society's first President was Lord Shaftesbury. Some of the earliest vice-Presidents were Henry Edward Manning, Robert Browning, Lord Coleridge, Thomas Carlyle and Alfred, Lord Tennyson.

Public opposition to vivisection led the Government to appoint the First Royal Commission on Vivisection in July 1875; it reported its findings on 8 January 1876, recommending that special legislation be enacted to control vivisection. This led to the Cruelty to Animals Act 1876, which reached the statute book on 15 August 1876. This Act remained in force for 110 years, until it was replaced by the Animals (Scientific Procedures) Act 1986.

The Victoria Street Society had advocated restriction of vivisection but from 1878 onwards declared total abolition of vivisection. This caused some early members such as George Hoggan the then honorary secretary and vice-president Archbishop of York William Thomson to resign. Cobb commented that the total abolitionist policy of vivisection introduced "a large batch of fresh recruits of new members who had long resented our previous half-hearted policy as they considered it to have been".

In 1897 the growing Victoria Street Society changed its name to the National Anti-Vivisection Society (NAVS). Stephen Coleridge was the director of NAVS.

In 1969, NAVS formed the International Association against Painful Experiments on Animals (IAAPEA). In 1990 the Society, having outgrown the premises in Harley Street it had occupied since 1964 (a move engineered by the then Secretary, Wilfred Risdon), moved to Goldhawk Road, London, with a subsequent move in 2006 to Millbank Tower, London.

=== Abolition ===
From 1878–1898, the National Anti-Vivisection Society had demanded total abolition of vivisection. In 1898, Stephen Coleridge took control of the executive committee and attempted to introduce restrictive legislative proposals. He envisioned progressively more stringent measures leading to total abolition. At a Council meeting on 9 February 1898 the following resolution was passed:

The Council affirms that, while the demand for the total abolition of vivisection will ever remain the ultimate object of the National Anti-Vivisection Society, the Society is not thereby precluded from making efforts in Parliament for lesser measures, having for its object the saving of animals from scientific torture.

The resolution was carried by 29 votes to 23. Cobbe did not want the Society to promote any measure short of abolition. She was living in semiretirement in Wales at the time and was furious with this decision. In response, she founded the British Union for the Abolition of Vivisection.

=== Brown Dog affair ===
In 1906, a statue was erected in Battersea Park of a brown terrier dog, one of a number of animals described in the journals of two Swedish anti-vivisection campaigners that was reported to have been illegally dissected during a demonstration to medical students at the University of London. The inscription on the statue reads:

In memory of the Brown Terrier Dog done to death in the laboratories of University College in February 1903, after having endured vivisection extending over more than two months and having been handed from one vivisector to another until death came to his release. Also in memory of the 232 dogs vivisected at the same place during the year 1902. Men and women of England, how long shall these things be?"

The statue became the target of animal researchers and London University medical students; students rioted at the site; anti-vivisectionists defended their statue; the elderly Frances Power Cobbe was attacked in her office.

The statue was quietly removed before dawn on 10 March 1910 by four council workmen, accompanied by 120 police officers. Nine days later, 3,000 anti-vivisectionists gathered in Trafalgar Square to demand its return, but it was clear by then that Battersea Council had turned its back on the affair. The statue was at first hidden in the borough surveyor's bicycle shed, according to a letter his daughter wrote in 1956 to the British Medical Journal, (Note: Marjorie F. M. Martin (The British Medical Journal, 15 September 1956): "When eventually the Borough Council decided that the statue must be removed, he [the correspondent's father and borough surveyor of Battersea] brought it that night into our bicycle shed, where it was unlikely to be found, until the legal battles were finished. Eventually it was removed to the Corporation yard.") then reportedly destroyed by a council blacksmith, who melted it down. Anti-vivisectionists filed a High Court petition demanding its return, but the case was dismissed in January 1911.

The NAVS and others erected a new statue with the same inscription in 1985, again in Battersea Park, where it remains to this day.

=== Second Royal Commission on Vivisection ===
In 1906 the Government appointed the Second Royal Commission on Vivisection. This Second Royal Commission heard a great deal of evidence from the NAVS and other interested parties. It published its findings in 1912, recommending an increase in the numbers of Home Office Inspectors; further limitations with regard to the use of curare (a paralysing drug which does not deaden pain, but can heighten it); stricter provisions as to the definition and practice of pithing; additional restrictions regulating the painless destruction of animals which show signs of suffering after experimentation; a change in the method of selecting, and in the constitution of, the advisory body of the Secretary of State*; and keeping of special records by vivisectors. (*This body, under the new 1986 Animals (Scientific Procedures) Act, is called the Animal Procedures Committee).

This was a long way from abolition; it did not deal with the issue of secrecy and public accountability; it left the vivisection community protected from outside control and scrutiny. Although each successive Home Secretary attached ‘pain conditions’ to all experiments, the ‘conditions’ were so worded that they afforded no protection to the animals whatsoever.

The NAVS believes there are good scientific arguments against the use of animals in research, not least because of the misleading results from animal experiments, due to species differences. Thus, they argue, abolishing animal research would be in the public interest. However, to pursue such a case would be prohibitively expensive.

In 1963, with animal experiments running into millions each year and a public deprived of information on the issue, the Government set up a ‘Departmental Committee on Experiments on Living Animals’ to consider the use of animals in research, and whether any changes in legislation were necessary. In 1965 the Littlewood Committee, as it was known, published 83 recommendations, and although none of the recommendations were designed to bring an end to animal experiments, no legislation was passed to put any of them into effect anyway.

Throughout the 20th Century, the NAVS lobbied government and drafted various Bills against a seemingly unstoppable rise in animal experiments ‘reaching almost 6 million per year in the UK by the 1970s’. When the trade in monkeys for use in vaccine tests devastated India's population of rhesus macaques, NAVS representatives went to India and successfully lobbied for a ban on the export of these animals, which was introduced in 1978.

In 1973, the NAVS, now based in Harley Street, London, sought a new strategy and founded the Lord Dowding Fund for Humane Research. The Fund was named after Hugh Dowding, the Air Chief Marshal and Battle of Britain Second World War hero. After the war, Lord Dowding became President of the NAVS and in the House of Lords made many impassioned speeches on animal experiments. His wife Lady Dowding was also an NAVS Council member (later becoming President after her husband's death).

This new strategy was to make positive steps to replace the use of animals in research, and to show that animal research is not necessary for medical and scientific progress. The Lord Dowding Fund continues to be responsible for ground breaking medical and scientific research that does not involve animals. Tens of thousands of animals have been saved, through the introduction of techniques and technology funded by the Lord Dowding Fund for Humane Research.

=== London and Provincial Anti-Vivisection Society ===
The London Anti-Vivisection Society was formed in 1876 and became known as the London and Provincial Anti-Vivisection Society (LPAVS) from 1907. The Society advocated total abolition of vivisection, not restriction. Its president was the Earl of Tankerville. An active member of LPAVS was a former British Union of Fascists member Norah Elam. Sidney Trist was its secretary. It published The Animals' Guardian, an illustrated magazine.

During 1916 and 1917, Elam obtained work as supervisor of a typewriting pool at the Medical Research Council (MRC), gaining a wealth of information she was to use later in articles published under the auspices of the LPAVS during 1934 and 1935. In March 1921, Elam advertised in The Times and chaired a public meeting of LPAVS to discuss 'The Dog's Bill' (a bill to prohibit the vivisection of Dogs) that was being debated in Parliament at that time. The meeting was held at the Aeolian Hall in London and as Chair, Elam read out 20 letters from Members of Parliament in support of the bill, and stated that, 'A large majority of the public were strongly in favour of the measure, and she felt sure that victory would be theirs if a determined effort were made, especially if women made proper use of their new political power'.

In 1932, the MRC had produced a paper called 'Vitamins, A Survey of Present Knowledge'. Elam's 1934 response was entitled 'The Vitamin Survey, A Reply' and was a critical appraisal of that survey and its results. This was followed in 1935 by 'The Medical Research Council, What it is and how it works'. The second paper was based on the same arguments about MRC research practices and remits as the first paper, but distilled and argued more cogently on a broader front. Elam's argument was that 'powerful vested interests' had managed to 'entrench' themselves behind 'State-aided research', and had managed to make themselves unaccountable; the public were unable to influence the decisions about what research should be undertaken, and it operated like a closed shop, only answerable to itself. Elam also argued that the research involved the cruel and inhumane use of animals, and that any thinking person had to question how and why research and results based on animal models could safely be extrapolated to humans. Finally, she complained that animal experimentation was doubly cruel because of the unnecessary repetition of experiments to replicate or prove the same point, which in many cases she argued could have been arrived at by simple, common sense. These papers were widely distributed and copies could be found in libraries throughout the UK.

In 1956, the London and Provincial Anti-Vivisection Society became part of the NAVS. This amalgamation was administered and encouraged by the contemporary Committee Secretary, Wilfred Risdon, who became Secretary of the NAVS thereafter.

=== Modern movement ===
After sustained lobbying by animal welfare organisations and other interested parties, in 1983 the UK Government announced that it intended to replace the Cruelty to Animals Act (at that time still in force despite it being introduced nearly one hundred years previously) and published a White Paper that (after consultation) would eventually form the basis of the new legislation. In light of its perceived weakness of the Government's proposals, and realising that outright abolition was unachievable in the current political climate, NAVS worked with other UK groups such as BUAV, Animal Aid and the Scottish Society, in the drawing-up of a list of key experiments that should be banned under new legislation. This list included a ban on the use of animals in tests for cosmetics, tobacco, alcohol products; warfare experiments; psychological and behavioural tests; a ban on the Median lethal dose and Draize eye irritancy tests, as well as other measures in relation to the administration of the legislation. Although the Animals (Scientific Procedures) Act received Royal Assent on 20 May 1986 and was later described as being an important factor in the UK having the "tightest system of regulation in the world", this view was not supported by animal welfare organisations.

It would not be until the late 1990s that a change of Government brought in bans on the use of animals for cosmetics research and a ban on the use of great apes would start the process of change. These were followed by the Freedom of Information Act 2000, which permitted wider public scrutiny of some scientific procedures.

More recently, in 2009, the year in which the European directive on animal testing regulations was being comprehensively reviewed for the first time in over two decades, NAVS and its animal and environmental group, Animal Defenders International, joined a call for a Europe-wide ban on the use of non-human primates in research. Although only minor concessions were secured in this area when legislation was subsequently passed in September 2010, the authors of the directive acknowledged that it was "an important step towards achieving the final goal of full replacement of procedures on live animals for scientific and educational purposes as soon as it is scientifically possible to do so". The authors also recommended that the directive be regularly reviewed so as to reflect the scientific advances made in this area, thereby leaving open the possibility that future legislation will incorporate more safeguards to ensure the protection and welfare of animals used in scientific experiments.

== Mission ==
The NAVS works to educate the public, parliament and researchers about the suffering caused to animals used in research, and how research outcomes are affected by species differences, as well as the biochemical effects of fear, anxiety and stress in the animals. Research results have been known to be affected by an animal’s age, diet, even bedding materials. NAVS promotes the adoption of advanced, scientific, non-animal techniques to replace the use of animals, especially through its non-animal research wing, the Lord Dowding Fund for Humane Research. (See also Animal Defenders International)

== Position on animal rights ==
Jan Creamer the director of NAVS in 2002 at the House of Lords stated that although in "many cases rights and welfare are very much linked", the National Anti-Vivisection Society is not an animal rights organization. She commented that the goal of the organization is unified in ending animal experimentation. According to Creamer "the remit of the people that we are representing today is against animal experiments. Some of our members are vegetarians, some are not. Some oppose fox hunting, some do not. We are representing a group of people who just agree on animal experiments."

== Publications ==
From 1897–1889 the NAVS published The Zoophilist magazine. In 1900 it became known as The Zoophilist and Animal's Defender and later The Animal's Defender and Zoophilist.

NAVS is associated with Animal Defenders International and the Lord Dowding Fund for Humane Research which publish the Animal Defender magazine (latest issue 2017).

== See also ==
- List of animal welfare organizations
- Women and animal advocacy
