= Leslie Turnberg, Baron Turnberg =

British physician and politician (born 1934)

The Right Honourable The Lord Turnberg FRCP FMedSci
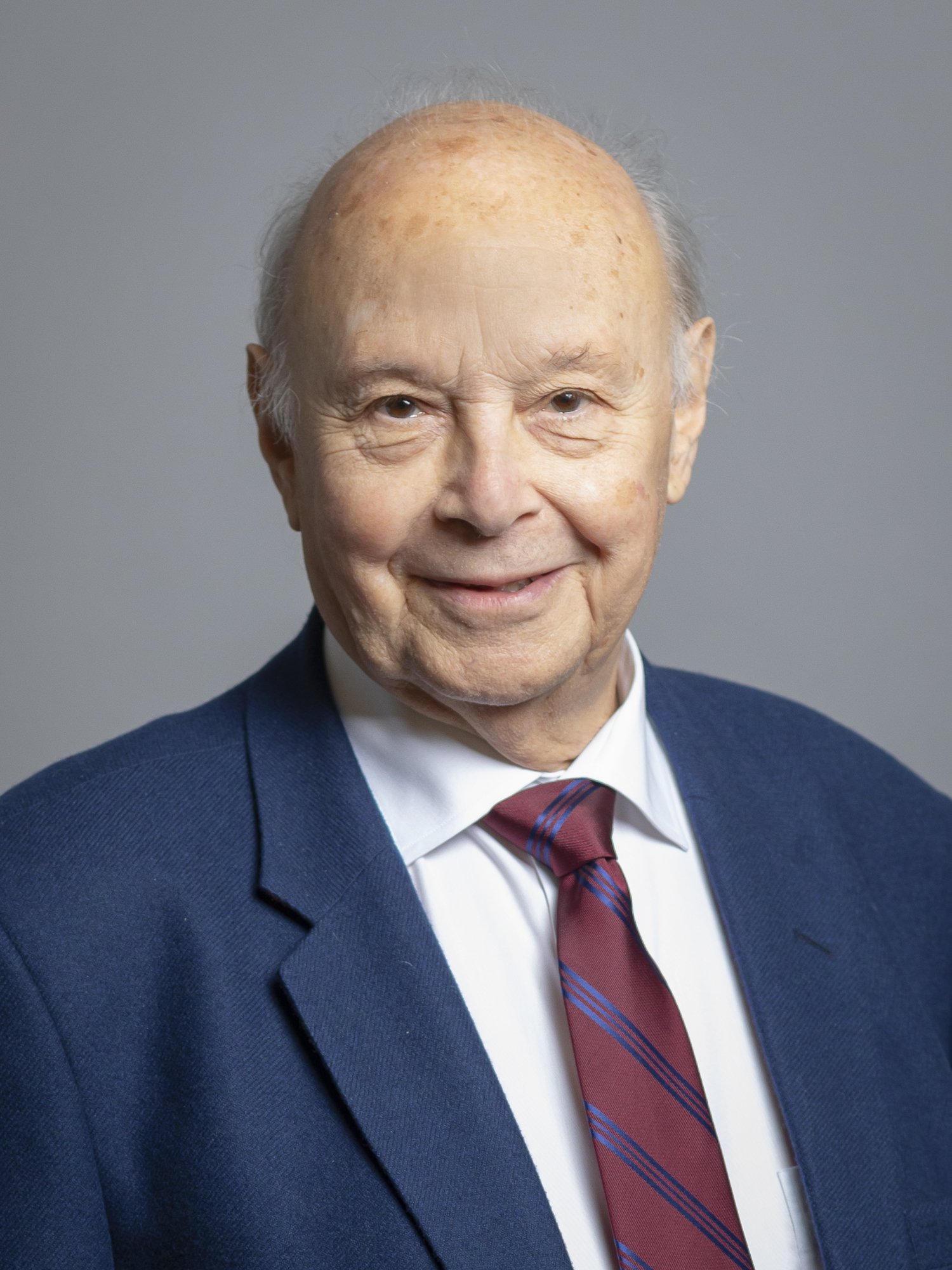
- Official portrait, 2020

Member of the House of Lords
- Lord Temporal
- Life peerage 4 May 2000 – 1 March 2026

Personal details
- Born: Leslie Arnold Turnberg; 22 March 1934 (age 92)
- Party: Labour (until 2019; since 2020)
- Other political affiliations: Non-affiliated (2019–2020)
- Education: Manchester University

Leslie Arnold Turnberg, Baron Turnberg (born 22 March 1934), is a British medical professional and an author of many publications and books related to the medical and health services fields. His experience extends to areas of research in these fields, and maintaining a clinical practice. He has published five books and some 150 articles on medical and scientific research. He has written two books on the history of Israel: Beyond the Balfour Declaration; the 100 Year Quest for Israeli-Palestinian Peace was published in 2017, and Mandate: Britain's Palestinian Burden, 1919–1939 was published in 2021. In May 2024, Patients First: How to Save the NHS was published.

In 2000, he was made a life peer. He resigned from the Labour group in July 2019 over the party's approach to Brexit and handling of allegations of antisemitism. He rejoined the party in June 2020, but remains unaffiliated.

== Early life and training ==
Turnberg was born in Manchester to Hyman Turnberg (of Romanian-Jewish origin) and his wife Dolly (born in Manchester to Polish-Jewish parents). He studied medicine at Manchester University from 1952 to 1957, and completed his house posts in North Manchester hospitals, and trained at the Manchester Royal Infirmary and later in London at the Whittington Hospital and University College Hospital. He developed a specialist interest in gastroenterology, lecturing at the Royal Free Hospital at the liver unit developed by Sheila Sherlock. He married in 1967 and spent a year in Dallas, Texas on a research fellowship with John S. Fordtran, before returning to Manchester as a lecturer in gastroenterology starting 1969. He would remain consultant gastroenterologist in Salford until 1997.

== Medical career ==
=== Professor and dean ===
In 1973 Turnberg was appointed professor of medicine at Hope Hospital (now Salford Royal) in Salford, where he developed the site as a teaching hospital by expanding academic interests. Turnberg made contributions to the understanding of the absorption of electrolytes in the small bowel, gastric secretions, and other areas of gastroenterology.

In 1983 the role of Dean of University of Manchester medical school rotated to Hope, and as senior professor there Turnberg assumed the position. He was involved with selection and during the three years as dean developed a new curriculum that pioneered problem-based learning.

=== President of the RCP ===
In 1992, on the resignation of Margaret Turner-Warwick as President of the Royal College of Physicians of London, Turnberg was elected as her successor. During his presidency, he improved the involvement of patients in the College's activities, expanded the College's premises in Regent's Park, and opened regional offices. His presidency saw the splitting off of the paediatricians and the formation of the Royal College of Paediatrics and Child Health (RCPCH), the formation of the Academy of Medical Royal Colleges (initially the Conference of Colleges), the establishment of the Academy of Medical Sciences, and the formation of bodies coordinating medical ethics and postgraduate medical training. He remained in position until 1997, when he was succeeded by George Alberti.

=== Medical positions ===
Turnberg holds honorary fellowships from sixteen different UK and overseas colleges and has held many different positions within the medical field. His other appointments included President of the Medical Protection Society from 1997 to 2007, Chairman of the Board of the Public Health Laboratory Service from 1997 to 2005, President of the Medical Council on Alcoholism from 2000 to 2005, Chair of the UK Forum for Genetics and Insurance from 1998 to 2002. His current appointments include scientific adviser to the Association of Medical Research Charities; trustee of the Wolfson Foundation, trustee of the Joseph Interfaith Foundation, He is fellow and former Vice President of the Academy of Medical Sciences.

=== Use of animals in research ===
In May 2004, the UK Government announced that it was establishing a national centre for "best practice" in animal testing called "The National Centre for the Replacement, Refinement and Reduction of Animals in Research". The board of the new centre was chaired by Lord Turnberg from 2004 to 2007. The focus of the centre is on the three Rs: the replacement, refinement, and reduction of animal testing. The three Rs were first published in the 1959 by W. M. S. Russell and Rex Birch in the book The Principles of Humane Experimentation Technique. The UK government currently still regards animal testing as necessary, but science minister Lord Sainsbury of Turville said that a "major opportunity" now existed to make progress in improving the welfare of animals used in testing through the three R's.

== Knighthood and peerage ==
Turnberg received a knighthood in 1994 Birthday Honours for services to medicine, having the honour conferred by The Queen on 13 December 1994. On 4 May 2000 he was created a Life Peer by Letters Patent, taking the title Baron Turnberg, of Cheadle in the County of Cheshire.

At the House of Lords, Turnberg speaks frequently on medical practice, medical ethics, and the Middle East.

He is President of the All-Party Britain-Israel Parliamentary Group and a parliamentary supporter of Labour Friends of Israel.

He resigned from the Labour group in July 2019 together with Ara Darzi and David Triesman. Turnberg cited dissatisfaction with the party's policies on foreign affairs, its approach to Brexit and what he called the "bypassing of parliamentary opinion" and the "overt anti-Semitism that permeates the party machine".

== Personal life ==
On the unexpected death of his son Daniel in 2007 he established a travelling fellowship that allows medical researchers from the Middle East to visit UK academic institutions.

== See also ==
- List of Barons in the Peerages of the British Isles

Academic offices
Preceded by Dame Margaret Turner-Warwick	President of the Royal College of Physicians; 1992–1997	Succeeded by George Alberti
Orders of precedence in the United Kingdom
Preceded by The Lord Layard	Gentlemen; Baron Turnberg	Followed by The Lord Mitchell
