= Do Animals Have Rights? =

2005 book by Alison Hills

- Author: Alison Hills
- Language: English
- Subjects: Animal rights
- Publisher: Icon Books, Totem Books
- Publication date: 2005
- Media type: Print (hardback, paperback)
- Pages: 247
- ISBN: 978-1840466232
- OCLC: 760651191
- Dewey Decimal: 179.3

Do Animals Have Rights? is a 2005 non-fiction book on animal rights by British philosopher Alison Hills from the University of Bristol. The book explores the ethics of factory farming, animal experimentation and other issues involving animals from a philosophical analysis.

Hills authored the book as an accessible examination of the ethical issues regarding the human use of animals. The book goes beyond the rights argument and delves into the moral issues and how they might be resolved. The book has chapters on the history of animal protection legislation; animal consciousness; human relationships with animals; and case studies on factory farming, fox hunting, science, and suffering and pets.

== Reception ==
The book was positively reviewed by Benjamin Hale as "carv[ing] a centre path between the so‐called ‘extreme’ animal rights view and the view which sees no merit in the claim that animals have rights".

Peter D, Thornton, in a review for the journal Laboratory Animals, commented that "this book can be read by anyone with an interest in animal use issues and human–animal interactions. I would particularly recommend it for those normally put off by the more traditional and stuffy (and usually overly tortuous) texts on the subject and by those who want exposure to a different viewpoint offered by the likes of Singer, Rollin or Regan."
