= Alison Hills =

British philosopher

Alison Hills is a British philosopher who specializes in moral philosophy, epistemology, and animal ethics.

Hills is Professor of Philosophy at St John's College, Oxford. She obtained her PhD in philosophy from Trinity College, Cambridge. She was a Fellow of Clare College, Cambridge. Hills lectured in philosophy at Bristol University from 2003 to 2006 before moving to St John's College, Oxford in 2006.

In September 2017 Hills was a member of the expert panel discussing Kant's Categorical Imperative on BBC Radio 4's In Our Time.

In 2005, Hills authored the book Do Animals Have Rights? The book was positively reviewed by Benjamin Hale as "carv[ing] a centre path between the so-called ‘extreme’ animal rights view and the view which sees no merit in the claim that animals have rights".

== Selected publications ==
=== Articles ===
- Animal Responsibilities (The New Statesman, 2008)

=== Books ===
- Hills, Alison (2005), Do Animals Have Rights?, Icon Books, ISBN 978-1840466232
- Hills, Alison; Press, Oxford University (2012), The Beloved Self: Morality and the Challenge from Egoism, Oxford University Press, ISBN 978-0199655168
- Hills, Alison (2016), "Gesinnung: responsibility, moral worth, and character", in Michalson, Gordon E (ed.), Kant's Religion Within the Boundaries of Mere Reason: A Critical Guide, Cambridge critical guides, Cambridge University Press, ISBN 978-1107018525
