= Ethics, Policy & Environment =

- Discipline: Ethics, geography
- Language: English
- Edited by: Benjamin Hale, Andrew Light

Publication details
- Former names: Ethics, Place & Environment; Philosophy & Geography
- History: 1998–present
- Publisher: Taylor & Francis (England)
- Frequency: Triannual
- Impact factor: 1.8 (2025)

Standard abbreviations
- ISO 4: Ethics Policy Environ.

Indexing
- ISSN: 2155-0085 (print); 2155-0093 (web)

Links
- Journal homepage

Ethics, Policy & Environment (formerly Ethics, Place & Environment: A Journal of Philosophy and Geography) is a peer-reviewed journal published three times a year by Taylor & Francis, featuring articles in English. It focuses on environmental ethics, environmental philosophy, environmental justice, normative dimension of environmental policy, animal welfare, development ethics, sustainability, and cultural values relevant to environmental concerns. It also covers practical applications of environmental, energy technology, regional, and urban policies.

The journal Philosophy & Geography (1998–2004) merged with Ethics, Place & Environment in 2005.

Benjamin Hale has been one of its editors.
