= Animal rights =

Rights belonging to animals

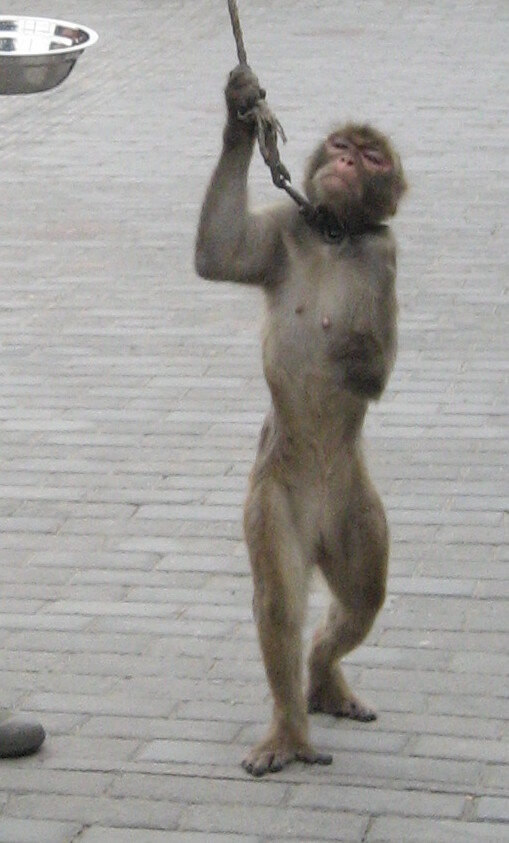
A captive monkey in Shanghai

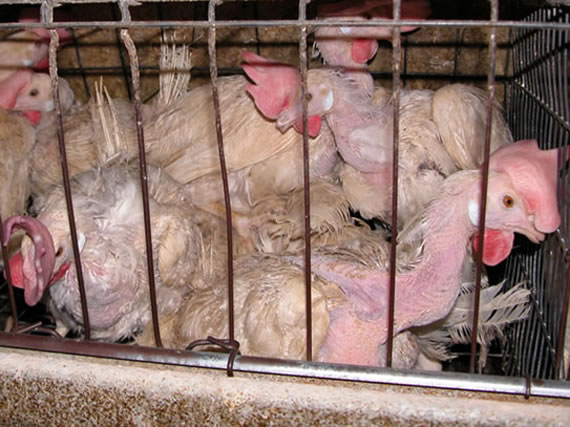
Chickens held inside a battery cage in a factory farm

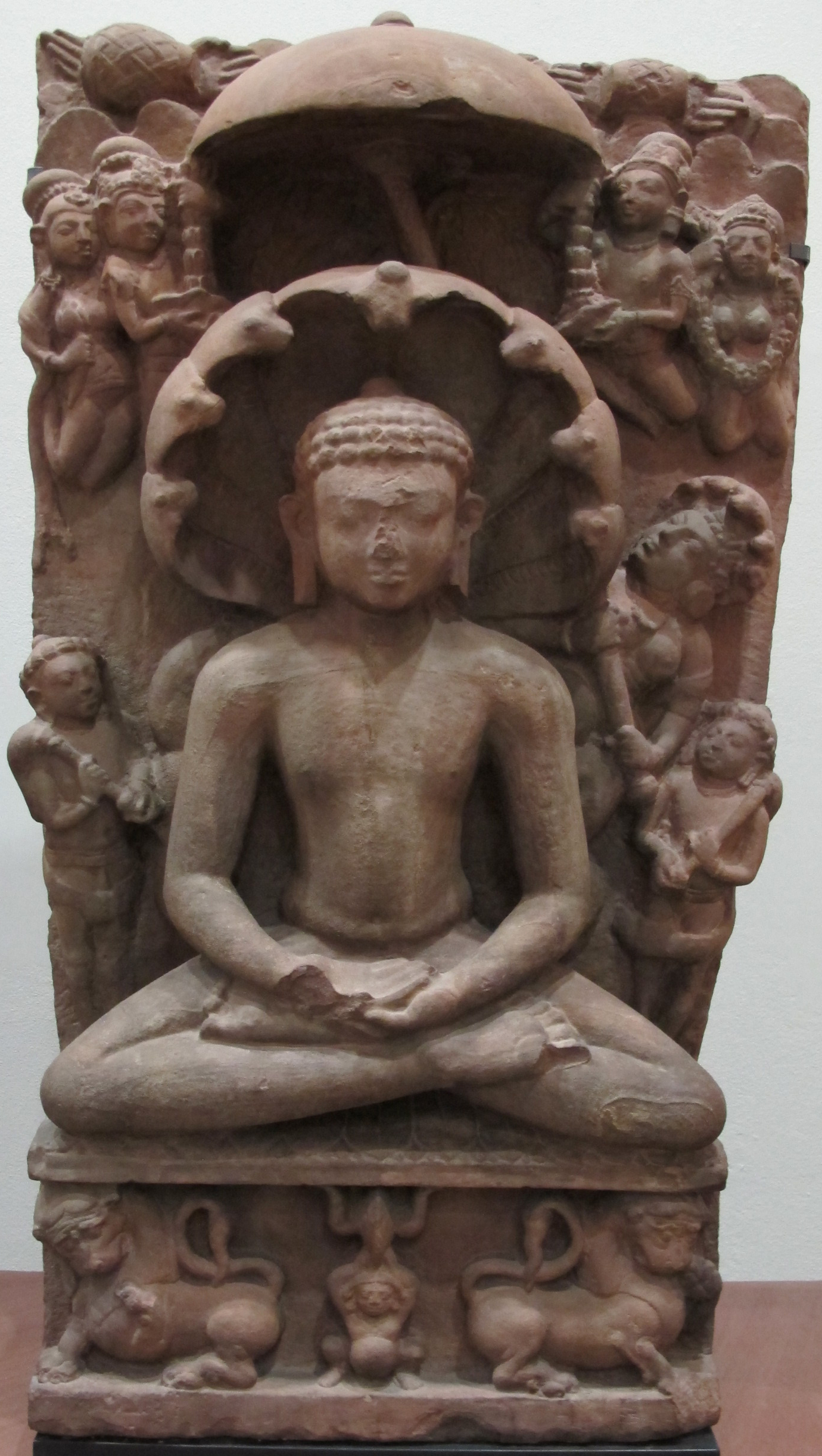
Parshvanatha, the 23rd Tirthankara, revived Jainism and ahimsa in the 9th century BCE, which led to a radical animal-rights movement in South Asia.

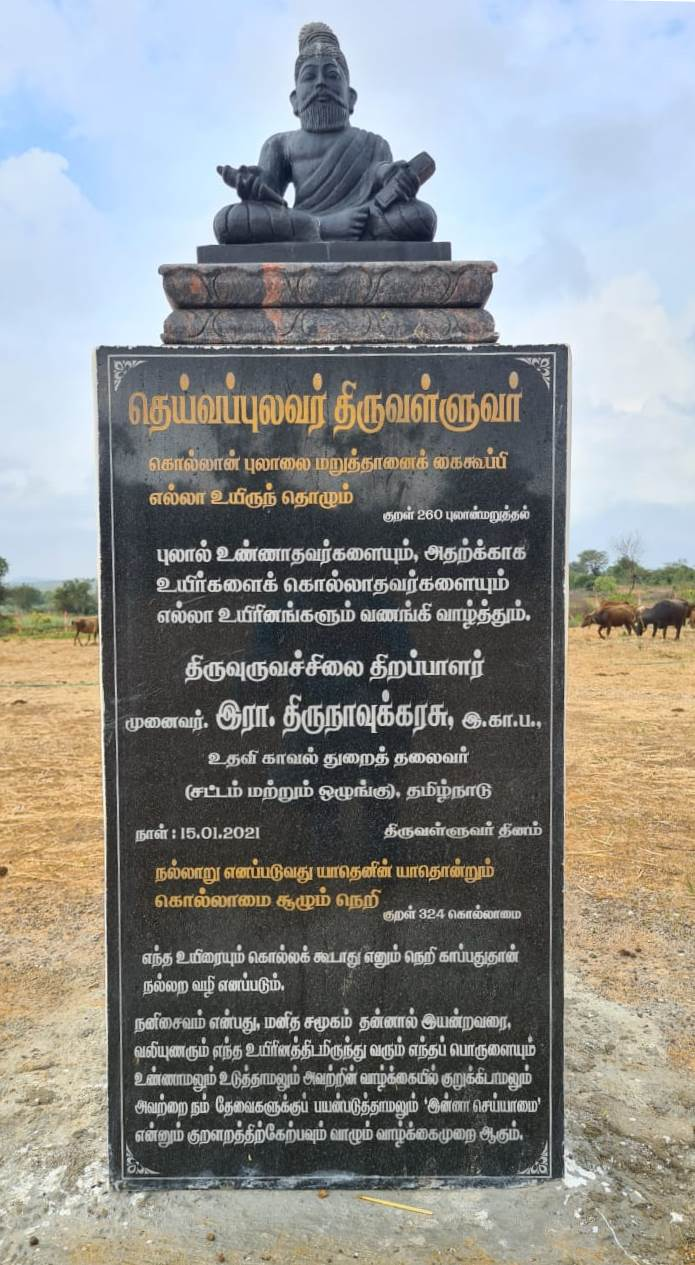
The c. 5th-century CE Tamil philosopher Valluvar, in his Tirukkural, taught ahimsa and moral vegetarianism as personal virtues. The plaque in this statue of Valluvar at an animal sanctuary in South India describes the Kural's teachings on ahimsa and non-killing, summing them up with the definition of veganism.

Animal rights is the philosophy according to which many or all sentient animals have moral worth independent of their utility to humans, and their most basic interests—such as avoiding suffering—should be afforded the same consideration as similar interests of human beings. The argument from marginal cases is often used to reach this conclusion. This argument holds that if human beings such as infants, senile people, and the cognitively disabled are granted moral status and negative rights, then nonhuman animals must be granted the same moral consideration, since animals do not lack any known morally relevant characteristic that marginal-case humans have.

Broadly speaking, and particularly in popular discourse, the term "animal rights" is often used synonymously with "animal protection" or "animal liberation". More narrowly, "animal rights" refers to the idea that many animals have fundamental rights to be treated with respect as individuals—rights to life, liberty, and freedom from torture—that may not be overridden by considerations of aggregate welfare. Like human rights, animal rights center on the notion of freedom.

Many animal rights advocates oppose assigning moral value and fundamental protections on the basis of species membership alone. They consider this idea, known as speciesism, a prejudice as irrational as any other, and hold that animals should not be considered property or used as food, clothing, entertainment, or beasts of burden merely because they are not human. Cultural traditions such as Jainism, Taoism, Hinduism, Buddhism, Shinto, and animism also espouse varying forms of animal rights.

In parallel to the debate about moral rights, North American law schools now often teach animal law, and several legal scholars, such as Steven M. Wise and Gary L. Francione, support extending basic legal rights and personhood to nonhuman animals. The animals most often considered in arguments for personhood are apes, especially great apes. Some animal-rights academics support this because it would break the species barrier, but others oppose it because it predicates moral value on mental complexity rather than sentience alone. As of November 2019, 29 countries had enacted bans on hominoid experimentation; Argentina granted captive orangutans basic human rights in 2014. Outside of primates, animal-rights discussions most often address the status of mammals (compare charismatic megafauna). Other animals (considered less sentient) have gained less attention—insects relatively little (outside Jainism) and animal-like bacteria hardly any. The vast majority of animals have no legally recognised rights.

Critics of animal rights argue that nonhuman animals are unable to enter into a social contract, and thus cannot have rights, a view summarised by the philosopher Roger Scruton, who writes that only humans have duties, and therefore only humans have rights. Another argument, associated with the utilitarian tradition, maintains that animals may be used as resources so long as there is no unnecessary suffering; animals may have some moral standing, but any interests they have may be overridden in cases of comparatively greater gains to aggregate welfare made possible by their use, though what counts as "necessary" suffering or a legitimate sacrifice of interests can vary considerably. Certain forms of animal-rights activism, such as the destruction of fur farms and of animal laboratories by the Animal Liberation Front, have attracted criticism, including from within the animal-rights movement itself, and prompted the U.S. Congress to enact laws, including the Animal Enterprise Terrorism Act, allowing the prosecution of this sort of activity as terrorism.

== History and background ==
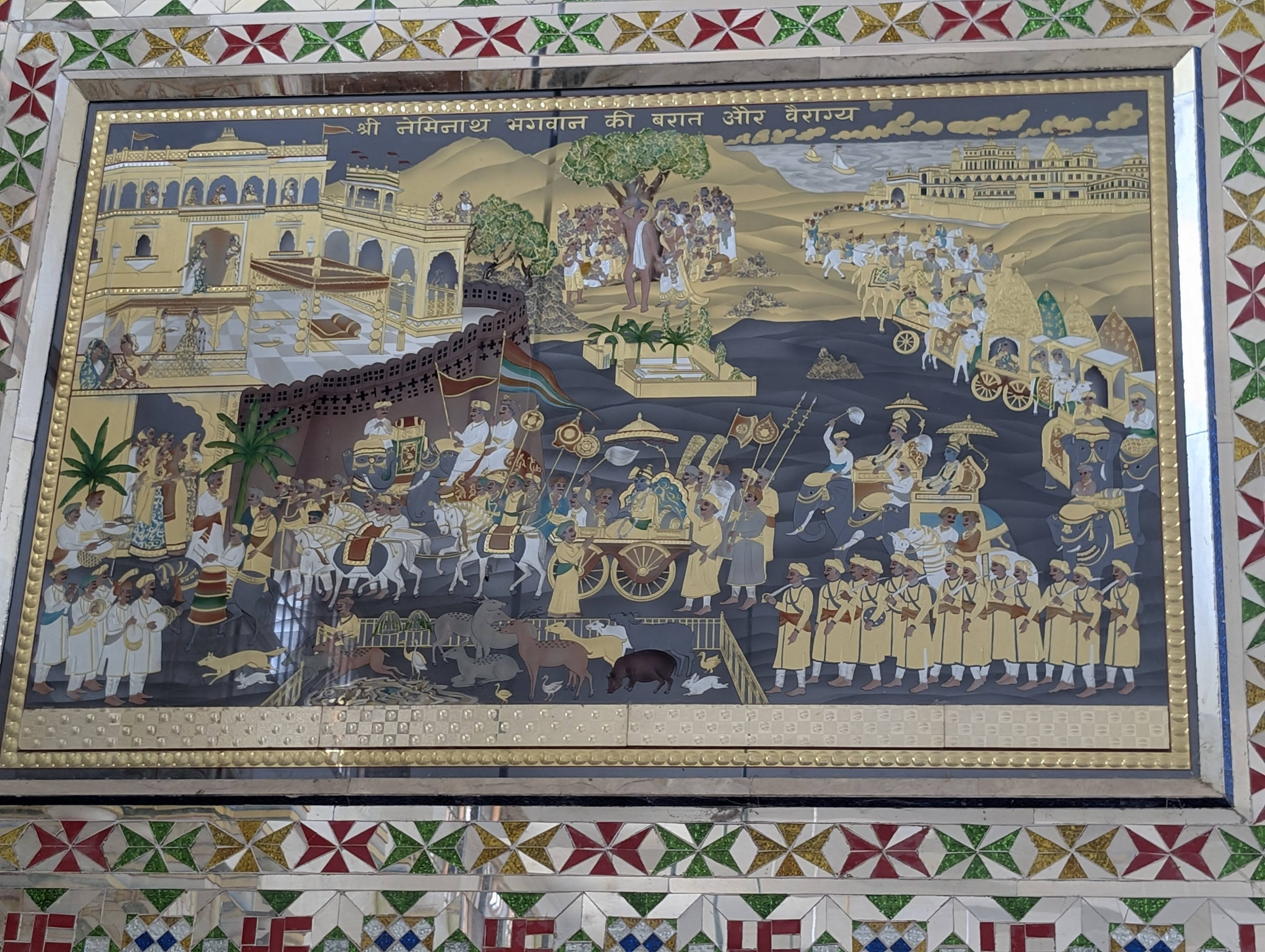
Wedding procession of Neminatha, 22nd Jain tirthankara and his renunciation seeing pain of animals kept for slaughter. Painting in Ranila Jain temple, Haryana

Hemachandra, a 12th-century Jain scholar and monk, achieved a significant political victory for vegetarianism in Indian history. He converted King Kumarapala of the Chaulukya dynasty (who ruled present-day Gujarat and surrounding areas) to Jainism. Under Hemachandra's guidance, Kumarapala issued sweeping imperial edicts (amari-ghoshana) that banned the slaughter of animals. This alliance is historically responsible for cementing Gujarat as the geographic epicenter of strict vegetarian cuisine in India.

In the 16th century, the Jain monk Hiravijaya Suri was invited to the court of the Mughal Emperor Akbar. Through philosophical discussions about nonviolence, the monk persuaded Akbar to issue imperial edicts (farmans) that enforced animal welfare across the empire. These edicts banned the slaughter of animals for several months of the year, prohibited fishing in specific sacred lakes, and mandated the release of thousands of caged birds. This represents one of the earliest recorded instances of state-enforced animal welfare and dietary restrictions at the imperial level in Indian history.

Jain communities established large-scale systems for animal welfare long ago. Jain merchants funded the creation of panjrapoles—specialized animal shelters and hospitals designed to care for sick, old, or rescued livestock and birds. The motivation for these shelters was not ethical philosophy, but the core Jain religious belief that committing violence against any living creature directly harms a person's soul and spiritual purity.

Serious discussion about animal rights began in 18th- and 19th-century Europe, but respect for animals can be found in most cultures and traditions, including Hinduism, Buddhism, Jainism, and some African and Indigenous cultures. In the Western world, Aristotle viewed animals as lacking reason and existing for human use, though other ancient philosophers believed animals deserved gentle treatment. Major religious traditions, chiefly Indian or Dharmic religions, opposed animal cruelty. While scholars like Descartes saw animals as unconscious automata, and Kant denied direct duties to animals, Jeremy Bentham emphasized their capacity to suffer. The publications of Charles Darwin eventually eroded the Cartesian view of animals. Darwin noted the mental and emotional continuity between humans and animals, suggesting the possibility of animal suffering. The anti-vivisection movement emerged in the late 19th and early 20th centuries, driven significantly by women. From the 1970s onward, growing scholarly and activist interest in animal treatment has aimed to raise awareness and reform laws to improve animal rights and human–animal relationships.

In The Sage Handbook of Promotional Culture and Society, Edwards et al. write, "unsurprisingly, no consensus is required to acknowledge that if a being can suffer, then it is wrong to make her suffer, regardless of the species." In the words of Jeremy Bentham, what matters is not a being's cognitive abilities or capacities, but whether they can feel and therefore experience suffering. The scientific consensus that nonhuman animals are not only sentient but also conscious, and therefore able to feel and generate states of mind accordingly, is affirmed by the 2012 Cambridge Declaration of Consciousness, which says "non-human animals have the neuroanatomical, neurochemical and neurophysiological substrates of conscious states along with the capacity to exhibit intentional behaviours." This further involves not only agency (the capacity to make choices and subjectivity, i.e., personhood or individual, differentiated traits) but also having a concept of death. These can be illustrated by the behavior of exploited animals (as in farming, labor, scientific laboratories), particularly their resistance to manipulation and confinement, including attempts to escape when opportunities arise.

== In religion ==
For some the basis of animal rights is in religion or animal worship (or in general nature worship), with some religions banning killing any animal. In other religions animals are considered unclean. Hindu and Buddhist societies abandoned animal sacrifice and embraced vegetarianism from the 3rd century BCE. One of the most important sanctions of the Jain, Hindu, and Buddhist faiths is the concept of ahimsa, or refraining from the destruction of life. According to Buddhism, humans do not deserve preferential treatment over other living beings. The Dharmic interpretation of this doctrine prohibits the killing of any living being. These Indian religions' dharmic beliefs are reflected in the ancient Indian works of the Tolkāppiyam and Tirukkural, which contain passages that extend the idea of nonviolence to all living beings.

The historical codification of Jain vegetarianism as a universal mandate for the lay community is sociologically anchored in the narrative of Neminatha, the 22nd tirthankara. According to Jain tradition, Prince Neminatha abandoned his royal wedding in Junagadh upon hearing the cries of captive animals slated to be slaughtered for the wedding feast. His renunciation is said to be followed by his meditation at Mount Girnar. His refusal to predicate personal celebration upon animal slaughter served as a defining cultural catalyst. Scholars identify this event as the foundational charter myth that shifted vegetarianism from an isolated ascetic exercise in self-denial into a universal ethical baseline regarding animal welfare for the entire Jain community.

In Islam, animal rights were recognized early by the Sharia. This recognition is based on both the Qur'an and the Hadith. The Qur'an contains many references to animals, detailing that they have souls, form communities, communicate with God, and worship Him in their own way. Muhammad forbade his followers to harm any animal and asked them to respect animals' rights. Nevertheless, Islam does allow eating of certain species of animals.

According to Christianity, all animals, from the smallest to the largest, are cared for and loved. According to the Bible, "All these animals waited for the Lord, that the Lord might give them food at the hour. The Lord gives them, they receive; The Lord opens his hand, and they are filled with good things." It further says God "gave food to the animals, and made the crows cry."

== Philosophical and legal approaches ==
=== Overview ===
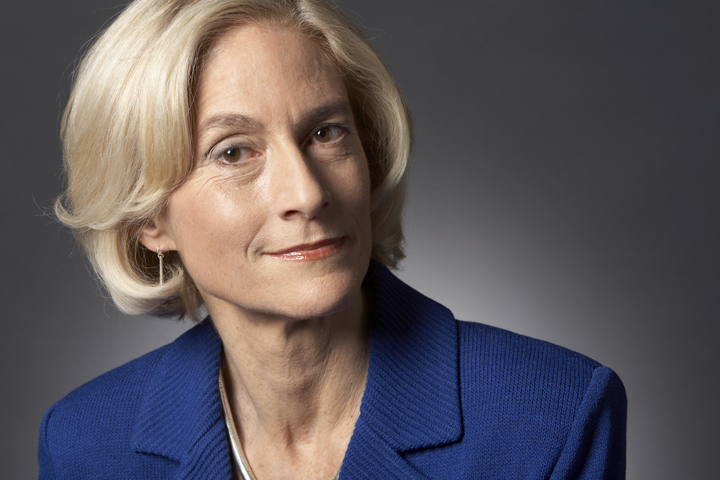
Martha Nussbaum, Professor of Law and Ethics at the University of Chicago, is a proponent of the capabilities approach to animal rights.

The two main philosophical approaches to animal ethics are utilitarian and rights-based. The former is exemplified by Peter Singer, and the latter by Tom Regan and Gary Francione. Their differences reflect a distinction philosophers draw between ethical theories that judge the rightness of an act by its consequences (consequentialism, teleological ethics, or utilitarianism), and those that focus on the principle behind the act, almost regardless of consequences (deontological ethics). Deontologists argue that there are acts we should never perform, even if failing to do so entails a worse outcome.

There are a number of positions that can be defended from a consequentalist or deontologist perspective, including the capabilities approach, represented by Martha Nussbaum, and the egalitarian approach, which has been examined by Ingmar Persson and Peter Vallentyne. The capabilities approach focuses on what individuals require to fulfill their capabilities: Nussbaum (2006) argues that animals need a right to life, some control over their environment, company, play, and physical health.

Stephen R. L. Clark, Mary Midgley, and Bernard Rollin also discuss animal rights in terms of animals being permitted to lead a life appropriate for their kind. Egalitarianism favors an equal distribution of happiness among all individuals, which makes the interests of the worse off more important than those of the better off. Another approach, virtue ethics, holds that in considering how to act we should consider the character of the actor, and what kind of moral agents we should be. Rosalind Hursthouse has suggested an approach to animal rights based on virtue ethics. Mark Rowlands has proposed a contractarian approach.

=== Utilitarianism ===
Nussbaum (2004) writes that utilitarianism, starting with Jeremy Bentham and John Stuart Mill, has contributed more to the recognition of the moral status of animals than any other ethical theory. The utilitarian philosopher most associated with animal rights is Peter Singer, professor of bioethics at Princeton University. Singer is not a rights theorist, but uses the language of rights to discuss how we ought to treat individuals. Until 2014, he was a preference utilitarian, meaning that he judged the rightness of an act by the extent to which it satisfies the preferences (interests) of those affected.

His position is that there is no reason not to give equal consideration to the interests of human and nonhumans, though his principle of equality does not require identical treatment. A mouse and a man both have an interest in not being kicked, and there are no moral or logical grounds for failing to accord those interests equal weight. Interests are predicated on the ability to suffer, nothing more, and once it is established that a being has interests, those interests must be given equal consideration. Singer quotes the English philosopher Henry Sidgwick (1838–1900): "The good of any one individual is of no more importance, from the point of view ... of the Universe, than the good of any other." Singer calls unequal treatment of nonhuman animals speciesism, where consideration of interest favors members of the individual's own species over any other species.

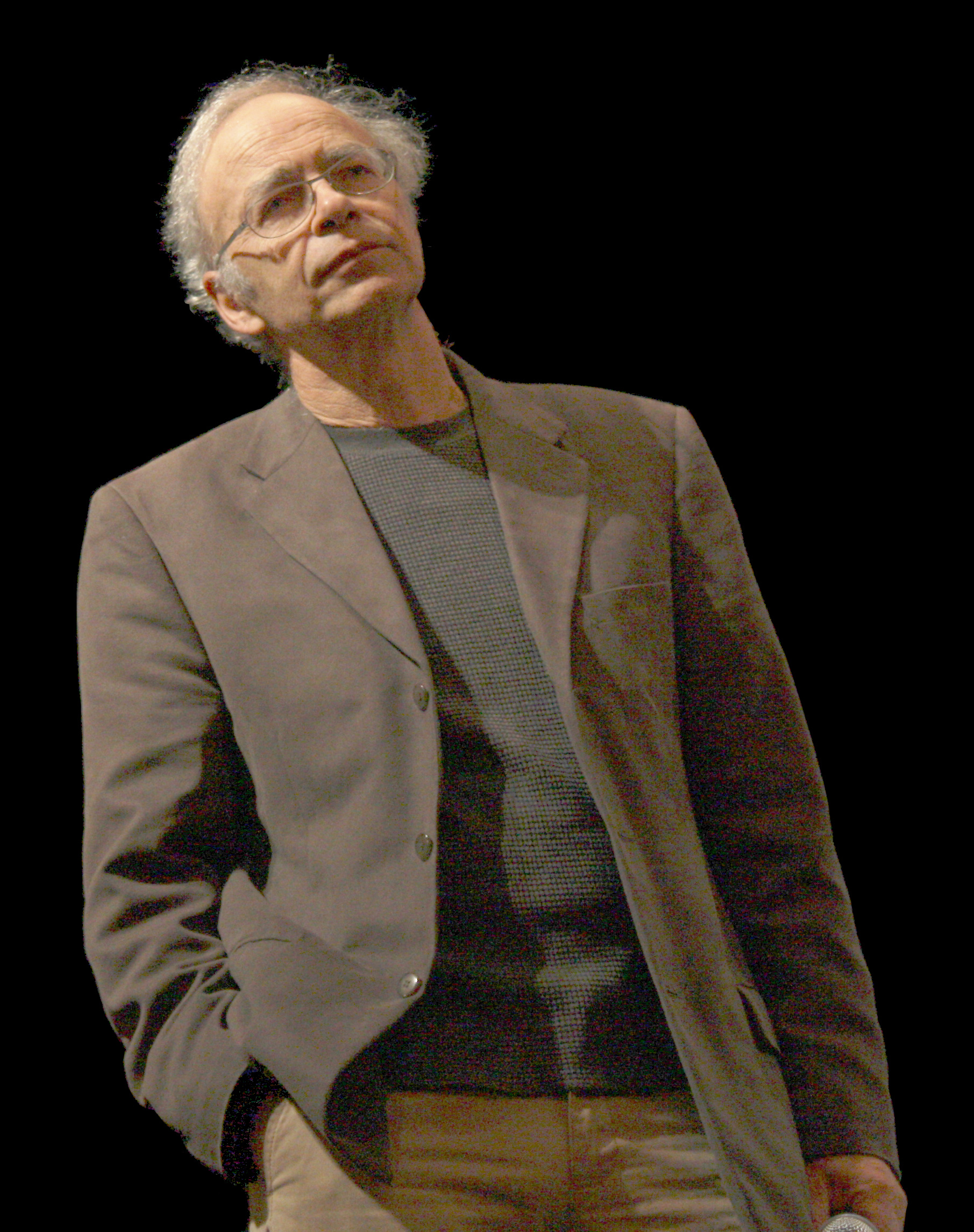
Peter Singer: interests are predicated on the ability to suffer.

Singer argues that equality of consideration is a prescription, not an assertion of fact: if the equality of the sexes were based only on the idea that men and women were equally intelligent, we would have to abandon the practice of equal consideration if this were later found to be false. But the moral idea of equality does not depend on matters of fact such as intelligence, physical strength, or moral capacity. Equality therefore cannot be grounded on the outcome of scientific investigations into the intelligence of nonhumans. All that matters is whether they can suffer.

People now accept that animals suffer and feel pain, but it was not always so. Bernard Rollin, professor of philosophy, animal sciences, and biomedical sciences at Colorado State University, writes that Descartes's influence continued to be felt until the 1980s. Veterinarians trained in the US before 1989 were taught to ignore pain, he writes, and at least one major veterinary hospital in the 1960s did not stock narcotic analgesics for animal pain control. In his interactions with scientists, he was often asked to "prove" that animals are conscious, and to provide "scientifically acceptable" evidence that they could feel pain.

Scientific publications have made it clear since the 1980s that the majority of researchers do believe animals suffer and feel pain, though it continues to be argued that their suffering may be reduced by an inability to experience the same dread of anticipation as humans or to remember the suffering as vividly. The ability of animals to suffer, even it may vary in severity, is the basis for Singer's application of equal consideration. The problem of animal suffering, and animal consciousness in general, arose primarily because it was argued that animals have no language. Singer writes that, if language were needed to communicate pain, it would often be impossible to know when humans are in pain, though we can observe pain behavior and make a calculated guess based on it. He argues that there is no reason to suppose that the pain behavior of nonhumans would have a different meaning from the pain behavior of humans.

=== Subjects-of-a-life ===
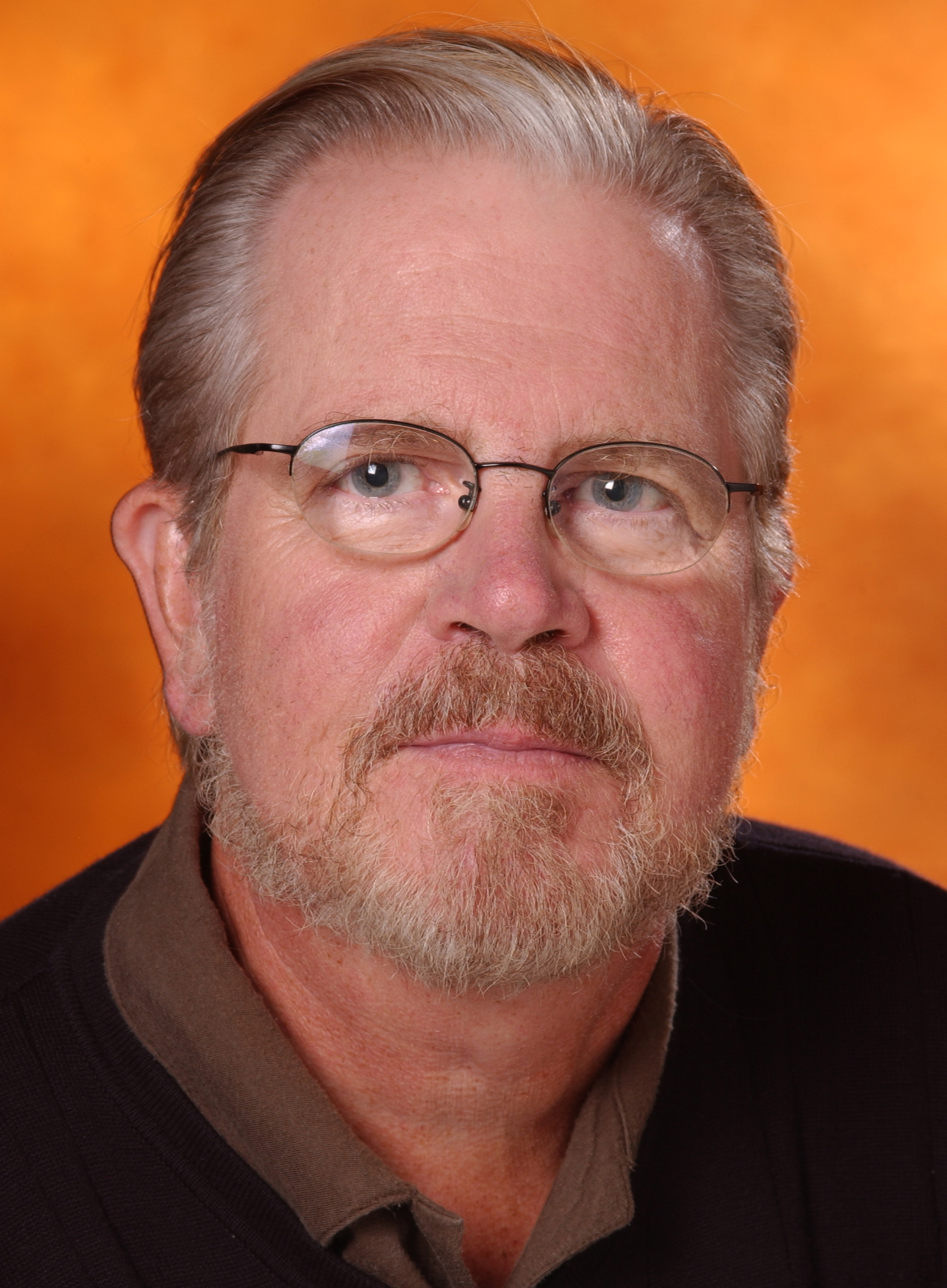
Tom Regan: animals are subjects-of-a-life.

Tom Regan, professor emeritus of philosophy at North Carolina State University, argues in The Case for Animal Rights (1983) that nonhuman animals are what he calls "subjects-of-a-life", and as such are bearers of rights. He writes that, because the moral rights of humans are based on their possession of certain cognitive abilities, and because these abilities are also possessed by at least some nonhuman animals, such animals must have the same moral rights as humans. Although only humans act as moral agents, both marginal-case humans, such as infants, and at least some nonhumans must have the status of "moral patients".

Moral patients are unable to formulate moral principles, and as such are unable to do right or wrong, even though what they do may be beneficial or harmful. Only moral agents are able to engage in moral action. Animals for Regan have "intrinsic value" as subjects-of-a-life, and cannot be regarded as a means to an end, a view that places him firmly in the abolitionist camp. His theory does not extend to all animals, but only to those that can be regarded as subjects-of-a-life. He argues that all normal mammals of at least one year of age would qualify:

... individuals are subjects-of-a-life if they have beliefs and desires; perception, memory, and a sense of the future, including their own future; an emotional life together with feelings of pleasure and pain; preference- and welfare-interests; the ability to initiate action in pursuit of their desires and goals; a psychophysical identity over time; and an individual welfare in the sense that their experiential life fares well or ill for them, logically independently of their utility for others and logically independently of their being the object of anyone else's interests.

Whereas Singer is primarily concerned with improving the treatment of animals and accepts that, in some hypothetical scenarios, individual animals might be used legitimately to further human or nonhuman ends, Regan believes we ought to treat nonhuman animals as we would humans. He applies the strict Kantian ideal (which Kant himself applied only to humans) that they ought never to be sacrificed as a means to an end, and must be treated as ends in themselves.

=== Abolitionism ===
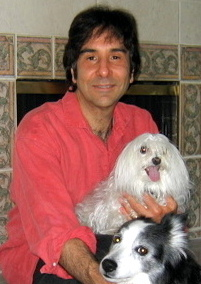
Gary Francione: animals need only the right not to be regarded as property.

Gary Francione, professor of law and philosophy at Rutgers Law School in Newark, is a leading abolitionist writer, arguing that animals need only one right, the right not to be owned. Everything else would follow from that paradigm shift. He writes that, although most people would condemn the mistreatment of animals, and in many countries there are laws that seem to reflect those concerns, "in practice the legal system allows any use of animals, however abhorrent." The law only requires that any suffering not be "unnecessary". In deciding what counts as "unnecessary", an animal's interests are weighed against the interests of human beings, and the latter almost always prevail.

Francione's Animals, Property, and the Law (1995) was the first extensive jurisprudential treatment of animal rights. In it, Francione compares the situation of animals to the treatment of slaves in the United States, where legislation existed that appeared to protect them while the courts ignored that the institution of slavery itself rendered the protection unenforceable. He offers as an example the United States Animal Welfare Act, which he describes as an example of symbolic legislation, intended to assuage public concern about the treatment of animals, but difficult to implement.

He argues that a focus on animal welfare, rather than animal rights, may worsen the position of animals by making the public feel comfortable about using them and entrenching the view of them as property. He calls animal rights groups who pursue animal welfare issues, such as People for the Ethical Treatment of Animals, the "new welfarists", arguing that they have more in common with 19th-century animal protectionists than with the animal rights movement; indeed, the terms "animal protection" and "protectionism" are increasingly favored. His position in 1996 was that there is no animal rights movement in the United States.

=== Contractarianism ===
Mark Rowlands, professor of philosophy at the University of Florida, has proposed a contractarian approach, based on the original position and the veil of ignorance—a "state of nature" thought experiment that tests intuitions about justice and fairness—in John Rawls's A Theory of Justice (1971). In the original position, individuals choose principles of justice (what kind of society to form, and how primary social goods will be distributed), unaware of their individual characteristics—their race, sex, class, or intelligence, whether they are able-bodied or disabled, rich or poor—and therefore unaware of which role they will assume in the society they are about to form.

The idea is that, operating behind the veil of ignorance, they will choose a social contract in which there is basic fairness and justice for them no matter the position they occupy. Rawls did not include species membership as one of the attributes hidden from the decision-makers in the original position. Rowlands proposes extending the veil of ignorance to include rationality, which he argues is an undeserved property similar to characteristics including race, sex and intelligence.

=== Prima facie rights theory ===
American philosopher Timothy Garry has proposed an approach that deems nonhuman animals worthy of prima facie rights. In a philosophical context, a prima facie (Latin for "on the face of it" or "at first glance") right is one that appears to be applicable at first glance, but upon closer examination may be outweighed by other considerations. In his book Ethics: A Pluralistic Approach to Moral Theory, Lawrence Hinman characterizes such rights as "the right is real but leaves open the question of whether it is applicable and overriding in a particular situation". The idea that nonhuman animals are worthy of prima facie rights is to say that, in a sense, animals have rights that can be overridden by many other considerations, especially those conflicting a human's right to life, liberty, property, and the pursuit of happiness. Garry supports his view arguing:

... if a nonhuman animal were to kill a human being in the U.S., it would have broken the laws of the land and would probably get rougher sanctions than if it were a human. My point is that like laws govern all who interact within a society, rights are to be applied to all beings who interact within that society. This is not to say these rights endowed by humans are equivalent to those held by nonhuman animals, but rather that if humans possess rights then so must all those who interact with humans.

In sum, Garry suggests that humans have obligations to nonhuman animals; animals do not, and ought not to, have uninfringible rights against humans.

=== Feminism and animal rights ===
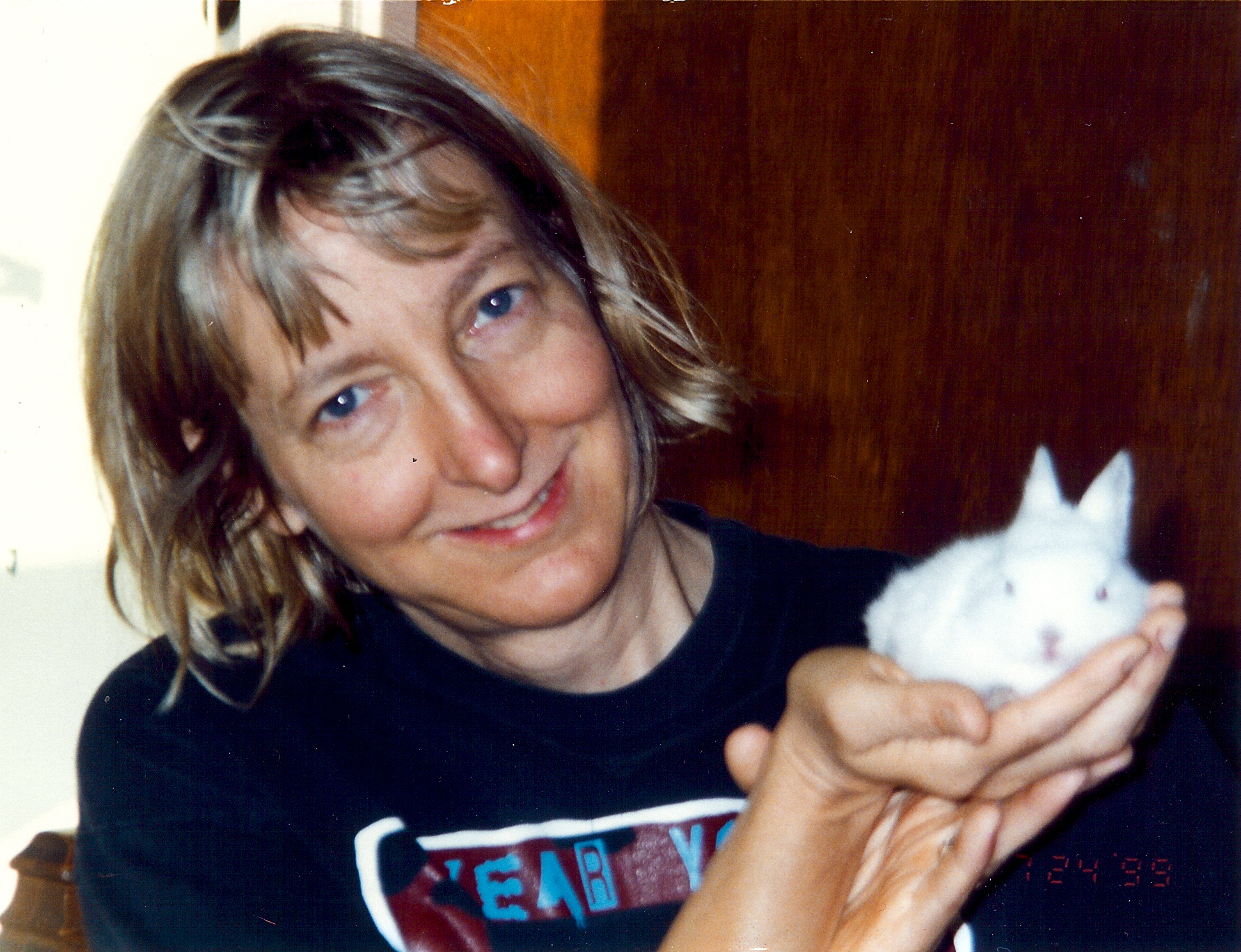
The American ecofeminist Carol Adams has written extensively about the link between feminism and animal rights, starting with The Sexual Politics of Meat (1990).

Women have played a central role in animal advocacy since the 19th century. The anti-vivisection movement in the 19th and early 20th century in England and the United States was largely run by women, including Frances Power Cobbe, Anna Kingsford, Lizzy Lind af Hageby and Caroline Earle White (1833–1916). Garner writes that 70 per cent of the membership of the Victoria Street Society (one of the anti-vivisection groups founded by Cobbe) were women, as were 70 per cent of the membership of the British RSPCA in 1900.

The modern animal advocacy movement has a similar representation of women. They are not invariably in leadership positions: during the March for Animals in Washington, D.C., in 1990—the largest animal rights demonstration held until then in the United States—most of the participants were women, but most of the platform speakers were men. Nevertheless, several influential animal advocacy groups have been founded by women, including the British Union for the Abolition of Vivisection by Cobbe in London in 1898; the Animal Welfare Board of India by Rukmini Devi Arundale in 1962; and People for the Ethical Treatment of Animals, co-founded by Ingrid Newkirk in 1980. In the Netherlands, Marianne Thieme and Esther Ouwehand were elected to parliament in 2006 representing the Parliamentary group for Animals.

The preponderance of women in the movement has led to a body of academic literature exploring feminism and animal rights, such as feminism and vegetarianism or veganism, the oppression of women and animals, and the male association of women and animals with nature and emotion, rather than reason—an association that several feminist writers have embraced. Lori Gruen writes that women and animals serve the same symbolic function in a patriarchal society: both are "the used"; the dominated, submissive "Other". When the British feminist Mary Wollstonecraft (1759–1797) published A Vindication of the Rights of Woman (1792), Thomas Taylor (1758–1835), a Cambridge philosopher, responded with an anonymous parody, A Vindication of the Rights of Brutes (1792), saying that Wollstonecraft's arguments for women's rights could be applied equally to animals, a position he intended as reductio ad absurdum. In her works The Sexual Politics of Meat: A Feminist-Vegetarian Critical Theory (1990) and The Pornography of Meat (2004), Carol J. Adams focuses in particular on what she argues are the links between the oppression of women and that of non-human animals.

=== Transhumanism ===
Some transhumanists argue for animal rights, liberation, and "uplift" of animal consciousness into machines. Transhumanism also understands animal rights on a gradation or spectrum with other types of sentient rights, including human rights and the rights of conscious artificial intelligences (posthuman rights).

=== Socialism and anti-capitalism ===
According to sociologist David Nibert of Wittenberg University, the struggle for animal liberation must happen in tandem with a more generalized struggle against human oppression and exploitation under global capitalism. He says that under a more egalitarian democratic socialist system, one that would "allow a more just and peaceful order to emerge" and be "characterized by economic democracy and a democratically controlled state and mass media", there would be "much greater potential to inform the public about vital global issues—and the potential for "campaigns to improve the lives of other animals" to be "more abolitionist in nature." Philosopher Steven Best of the University of Texas at El Paso states that the animal liberation movement, as characterized by the Animal Liberation Front and its various offshoots, "is a significant threat to global capital."

... Animal liberation challenges large sectors of the capitalist economy by assailing corporate agriculture and pharmaceutical companies and their suppliers. Far from being irrelevant to social movements, animal rights can form the basis for a broad coalition of progressive social groups and drive changes that strike at the heart of capitalist exploitation of animals, people and the earth.

According to sociologist Richard Twine, animals themselves serve as producers and product for human consumption within a global capitalist system. He believes that the capitalist system exploits animals as a producer and a product, which he calls the "profoundly speciesist animal-industrial complex".

=== Animal rights and far-right ideologies ===
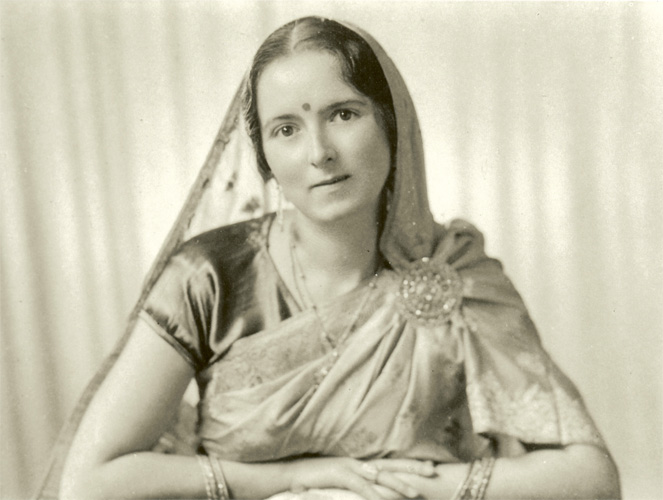
Savitri Devi was an animal rights proponent and a supporter of a fusion between Hinduism and Nazism. She remains influential in Eco-Fascist circles today.

Many members of Germany's Nazi Party were proponents of vegetarianism and animal rights. Adolf Hitler regarded himself as a vegetarian, and according to a transcript of one of Hitler's Table Talks, he said "the world of the future will be vegetarian." Other radical proponents of animal rights included Hindu writer Savitri Devi, the author of Impeachment of Man. In her book Long-Whiskers and the Two-Legged Goddess, she wrote of Heliodora, a woman much like herself, who was "much too profoundly shocked at the behaviour of man towards animals... to have any sympathy for people suffering on account of their being Jews."

Today there is a growing ecofascist movement influenced by past rightist commentators that incorporates animal rights into its ideology.

=== Critics ===
==== R. G. Frey ====
R. G. Frey, professor of philosophy at Bowling Green State University, is a preference utilitarian. In his early work, Interests and Rights (1980), Frey disagreed with Singer—who wrote in Animal Liberation (1975) that the interests of nonhuman animals must be given equal consideration when judging the consequences of an act—on the grounds that animals have no interests. Frey argues that interests are dependent on desire, and that no desire can exist without a corresponding belief. Animals have no beliefs, because a belief state requires the ability to hold a second-order belief—a belief about the belief—which he argues requires language: "If someone were to say, e.g. 'The cat believes that the door is locked,' then that person is holding, as I see it, that the cat holds the declarative sentence 'The door is locked' to be true; and I can see no reason whatever for crediting the cat or any other creature which lacks language, including human infants, with entertaining declarative sentences."

==== Carl Cohen ====
Carl Cohen, professor of philosophy at the University of Michigan, argues that rights holders must be able to distinguish between their own interests and what is right. "The holders of rights must have the capacity to comprehend rules of duty governing all, including themselves. In applying such rules, [they] ... must recognize possible conflicts between what is in their own interest and what is just. Only in a community of beings capable of self-restricting moral judgments can the concept of a right be correctly invoked." Cohen rejects Singer's argument that, since a brain-damaged human could not make moral judgments, moral judgments cannot be used as the distinguishing characteristic for determining who is awarded rights. Cohen writes that the test for moral judgment "is not a test to be administered to humans one by one", but should be applied to the capacity of members of the species in general.

==== Richard Posner ====
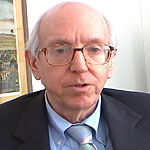
Judge Richard Posner: "facts will drive equality."

Judge Richard Posner of the United States Court of Appeals for the Seventh Circuit debated the issue of animal rights in 2001 with Peter Singer. Posner posits that his moral intuition tells him "that human beings prefer their own. If a dog threatens a human infant, even if it requires causing more pain to the dog to stop it, than the dog would have caused to the infant, then we favour the child. It would be monstrous to spare the dog."

Singer challenges this by arguing that formerly unequal rights for gays, women, and certain races were justified using the same set of intuitions. Posner replies that equality in civil rights did not occur because of ethical arguments, but because facts mounted that there were no morally significant differences between humans based on race, sex, or sexual orientation that would support inequality. If and when similar facts emerge about humans and animals, the differences in rights will erode too. But facts will drive equality, not ethical arguments that run contrary to instinct, he argues. Posner calls his approach "soft utilitarianism", in contrast to Singer's "hard utilitarianism". He argues:

The "soft" utilitarian position on animal rights is a moral intuition of many, probably most, Americans. We realize that animals feel pain, and we think that to inflict pain without a reason is bad. Nothing of practical value is added by dressing up this intuition in the language of philosophy; much is lost when the intuition is made a stage in a logical argument. When kindness toward animals is levered into a duty of weighting the pains of animals and of people equally, bizarre vistas of social engineering are opened up.

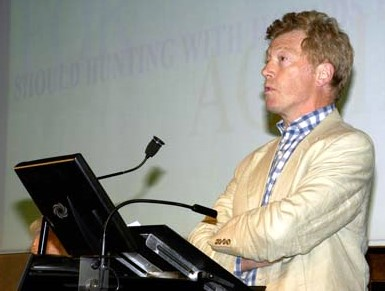
Roger Scruton: rights imply obligations.

==== Roger Scruton ====
Roger Scruton, the British philosopher, argued that rights imply obligations. Every legal privilege, he wrote, imposes a burden on the one who does not possess that privilege: that is, "your right may be my duty." Scruton therefore regarded the emergence of the animal rights movement as "the strangest cultural shift within the liberal worldview", because the idea of rights and responsibilities is, he argued, distinctive to the human condition, and it makes no sense to spread them beyond our own species.

He accused animal rights advocates of "pre-scientific" anthropomorphism, attributing traits to animals that are, he says, Beatrix Potter-like, where "only man is vile." It is within this fiction that the appeal of animal rights lies, he argued. The world of animals is non-judgmental, filled with dogs who return our affection almost no matter what we do to them, and cats who pretend to be affectionate when, in fact, they care only about themselves. It is, he argued, a fantasy, a world of escape.

Scruton singled out Peter Singer, a prominent Australian philosopher and animal-rights activist, for criticism. He wrote that Singer's works, including Animal Liberation, "contain little or no philosophical argument. They derive their radical moral conclusions from a vacuous utilitarianism that counts the pain and pleasure of all living things as equally significant and that ignores just about everything that has been said in our philosophical tradition about the real distinction between persons and animals."

Tom Regan countered this view of rights by distinguishing moral agents and moral patients.

== Public attitudes ==
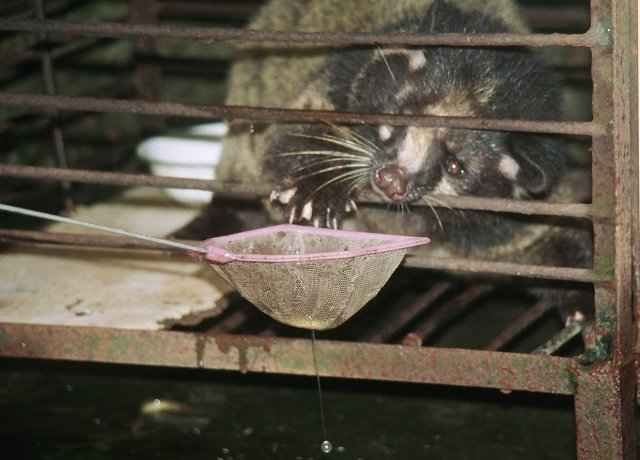
A civet, or sea fox, photographed in 2001 in the Zigong People's Park Zoo, Sichuan, by the Asian Animal Protection Network. The animal was kept hungry so that visitors could feed him live eels from a ladle.

According to a 2000 paper by Harold Herzog and Lorna Dorr, previous academic surveys of attitudes toward animal rights tended to have small sample sizes and non-representative groups. But a number of factors appear to correlate with people's attitudes about the treatment of animals and animal rights. These include gender, age, occupation, religion, and level of education. There is also evidence suggesting that experience with pets may be a factor in people's attitudes.

According to some studies, women are more likely to empathize with the cause of animal rights than men. A 1996 study suggested that factors that may partially explain this discrepancy include attitudes towards feminism and science, scientific literacy, and the presence of a greater emphasis on "nurturance or compassion" among women.

A common misconception about animal rights is that its proponents want to grant nonhuman animals the same legal rights as humans, such as the right to vote. This is false. Rather, the idea is that animals should have rights that accord with their interests (for example, cats have no interest in voting, and so should not have the right to vote). A 2016 study found that support for animal testing may not be based on cogent philosophical rationales and that more open debate is warranted.

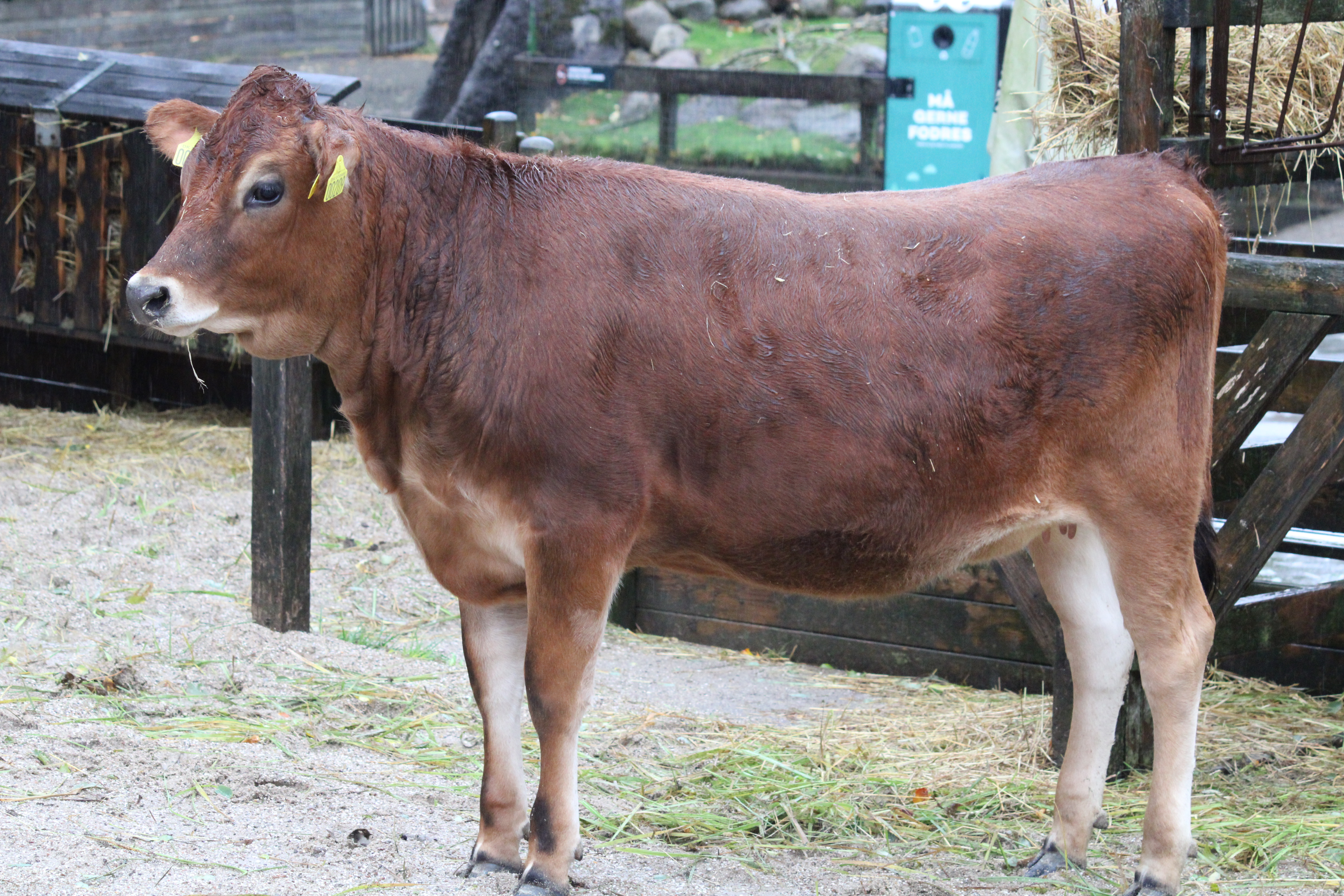
Cattle are among the most killed animals by humans, predominately due to food production

A 2007 survey that examined whether people who believe in evolution are more likely to support animal rights than creationists and believers in intelligent design found that this was largely the case; according to the researchers, strong Christian fundamentalists and believers in creationism were less likely to advocate for animal rights than those who were less fundamentalist in their beliefs. The findings extended previous research, such as a 1992 study that found that 48% of animal rights activists were atheists or agnostic. A 2019 Washington Post study found that those with favorable attitudes toward animal rights also tend to have favorable views of universal healthcare; reducing discrimination against African Americans, the LGBT community, and undocumented immigrants; and expanding welfare to aid the poor.

Two surveys found that attitudes toward animal rights tactics, such as direct action, are very diverse within the animal rights communities. Near half (50% and 39% in two surveys) of activists do not support direct action. One survey concluded, "it would be a mistake to portray animal rights activists as homogeneous."

Even though around 90% of U.S. adults regularly consume meat, almost half of them appear to support a ban on slaughterhouses: in Sentience Institute's 2017 survey of 1,094 U.S. adults' attitudes toward animal farming, 49% "support a ban on factory farming, 47% support a ban on slaughterhouses, and 33% support a ban on animal farming". The 2017 survey was replicated by researchers at Oklahoma State University, who found similar results: 73% of respondents answered "yes" to the question "Were you aware that slaughterhouses are where livestock are killed and processed into meat, such that, without them, you would not be able to consume meat?"

In the U.S., the National Farmers Organization held many public protest slaughters in the late 1960s and early 1970s. Protesting low prices for meat, farmers killed their animals in front of media representatives. The carcasses were wasted and not eaten. This effort backfired because it angered people to see animals needlessly and wastefully killed.

== See also ==
- Animal cognition
- Animal consciousness
- Animal–industrial complex
- Animal resistance
- Animal rights by country or territory
- Animal studies
- Animal suffering
- Animal trial
- Animal Welfare Institute
- Antinaturalism (politics)
- Bibliography of animal rights
- Cambridge Declaration on Consciousness
- Chick culling
- Cruelty to animals
- Critical animal studies
- Deep ecology
- Do Animals Have Rights? (book)
- List of animal rights advocates
- List of songs about animal rights
- Moral circle expansion
- Non-human electoral candidate
- Open rescue
- Plant rights
- Sentientism
- Timeline of animal welfare and rights
- Wild animal suffering
- World Animal Day
