= Stephanie Amiel =

British physician and academic

Dame Stephanie Amiel DBE
- Born: 17 October 1954 (age 71); Farnborough, Kent, England
- Education: Guy's Hospital School of Medicine
- Spouse: Sir George Alberti (m. 1998)
- Scientific career
- Fields: Medicine; Type 1 diabetes
- Institutions: Yale University; St Bartholomew's Hospital, London; Guy's Hospital, London; King's College London; King's College Hospital, London

Dame Stephanie Anne Amiel, Lady Alberti (born 17 October 1954) is a British physician and academic, specialising in type 1 diabetes. From 1995 to 2018, she was the R. D. Lawrence Professor of Diabetic Medicine at King's College London. She has also been an honorary consultant at King's College Hospital since 1995.

== Early life and education ==
Amiel was born on 17 October 1954 in Farnborough, Kent, England. She was educated at Baston School for Girls, an all-girls private school in Kent. She studied at Guy's Hospital School of Medicine, graduating with a Bachelor of Science (BSc) degree in 1975 and Bachelor of Medicine, Bachelor of Surgery (MBBS) degrees in 1978. She later undertook research towards a Doctor of Medicine (MD) degree which she completed in 1988.

== Academic career ==
From 1983 to 1986, Amiel was a research fellow at Yale University. At Yale she undertook research in diabetes under professors William V. Tamborlane and Robert Stanley Sherwin. She then returned to England, and was a research fellow and honorary senior registrar at St Bartholomew's Hospital in the City of London from 1986 to 1989. Between 1989 and 1995, she was a senior lecturer and honorary consultant at Guy's Hospital in the London Borough of Southwark. In May 1995, she joined King's College London as the R. D. Lawrence Professor of Diabetic Medicine. She is also a consultant physician to the diabetes services at King's College Hospital NHS Foundation Trust. In 2018, she stepped down from the R. D. Lawrence Chair to become Professor of Diabetes Research. She then retired from full-time academia in 2021 and made emeritus professor.

Amiel's research continues to be focused on type 1 diabetes. As a practising physician, she specialises in intensive insulin therapy, insulin pumps, and diabetes in pregnancy. Her academic interests include diabetic hypoglycaemia, islet transplantation, and diabetes and mental health.

== Personal life ==
In 1998, Amiel married the British physician Sir George Alberti. This marriage brought three stepsons.

== Selected works ==
- Amiel, S. A. (February 2001). "Islet transplantation". Diabetic Medicine. 18 (2): 77. doi:10.1046/j.1464-5491.2001.00502.x. PMID 11251670. S2CID 42496791.
- Amiel, S. A.; Matyka, K. (2003). "Hypoglycemia in Type 1 Diabetes". In Sperling, Mark A. (ed.). Type 1 diabetes: etiology and treatment. Totowa, N.J.: Humana Press. pp. 321–343. ISBN 978-0-89603-931-5.
- Amiel, S. A.; Blott, M. (25 June 2004). "A Randomized Trial Evaluating a Predominantly Fetal Growth-Based Strategy to Guide Management of Gestational Diabetes in Caucasian Women: Response to Schaefer-Graf et al". Diabetes Care. 27 (7): 1848, author reply 1848–9. doi:10.2337/diacare.27.7.1848. PMID 15220290.
- Mathiesen, E. R.; Kinsley, B.; Amiel, S. A.; Heller, S.; McCance, D.; Duran, S.; Bellaire, S.; Raben, A. (28 March 2007). "Maternal Glycemic Control and Hypoglycemia in Type 1 Diabetic Pregnancy: A randomized trial of insulin aspart versus human insulin in 322 pregnant women". Diabetes Care. 30 (4): 771–776. doi:10.2337/dc06-1887. PMID 17392539.
- Amiel, S. A.; Dixon, T.; Mann, R.; Jameson, K. (March 2008). "Hypoglycaemia in Type 2 diabetes". Diabetic Medicine. 25 (3): 245–254. doi:10.1111/j.1464-5491.2007.02341.x. PMC 2327221. PMID 18215172.
- Amiel, S. A.; Cryer, P. E. (26 February 2009). "Attenuated Sympathoadrenal Responses, but Not Severe Hypoglycemia, During Aggressive Glycemic Therapy of Early Type 2 Diabetes". Diabetes. 58 (3): 515–517. doi:10.2337/db08-1647. PMC 2646046. PMID 19246599.
- Amiel, S. A. (28 July 2009). "Hypoglycemia: From the Laboratory to the Clinic". Diabetes Care. 32 (8): 1364–1371. doi:10.2337/dc09-0113. PMC 2713613. PMID 19638523.
- Amiel, S. A. (April 2014). "A life in balance: wandering the pathways of control". Diabetic Medicine. 31 (4): 382–392. doi:10.1111/dme.12351. PMID 24765675.
- Amiel, Stephanie A; Pursey, Nancy; Higgins, Bernard; Dawoud, Dalia (26 August 2015). "Diagnosis and management of type 1 diabetes in adults: summary of updated NICE guidance". BMJ. 351 h4188. doi:10.1136/bmj.h4188. PMID 26311706. S2CID 206907064.
- Thabit, Hood; Leelarathna, Lalantha; Wilinska, Malgorzata E.; Elleri, Daniella; Allen, Janet M.; Lubina-Solomon, Alexandra; Walkinshaw, Emma; Stadler, Marietta; Choudhary, Pratik; Mader, Julia K.; Dellweg, Sibylle; Benesch, Carsten; Pieber, Thomas R.; Arnolds, Sabine; Heller, Simon R.; Amiel, Stephanie A.; Dunger, David; Evans, Mark L.; Hovorka, Roman (November 2015). "Accuracy of Continuous Glucose Monitoring During Three Closed-Loop Home Studies Under Free-Living Conditions". Diabetes Technology & Therapeutics. 17 (11): 801–807. doi:10.1089/dia.2015.0062. PMC 4649721. PMID 26241693.
- Naidu, Vasanth Venkat; Ismail, Khalida; Amiel, Stephanie; Kohli, Reena; Crosby-Nwaobi, Roxanne; Sivaprasad, Sobha; Stewart, Robert; Lewin, Alfred S (15 January 2016). "Associations between Retinal Markers of Microvascular Disease and Cognitive Impairment in Newly Diagnosed Type 2 Diabetes Mellitus: A Case Control Study". PLOS ONE. 11 (1) e0147160. Bibcode:2016PLoSO..1147160N. doi:10.1371/journal.pone.0147160. PMC 4714814. PMID 26771382.
- Winkley, Kirsty; Stahl, Daniel; Chamley, Mark; Stopford, Rosanna; Boughdady, Monica; Thomas, Stephen; Amiel, Stephanie A; Forbes, Angus; Ismail, Khalida (January 2016). "Low attendance at structured education for people with newly diagnosed type 2 diabetes: General practice characteristics and individual patient factors predict uptake". Patient Education and Counseling. 99 (1): 101–107. doi:10.1016/j.pec.2015.08.015. PMID 26319362. S2CID 8377512.
