= Benjamin Hale =

Benjamin Hale may refer to:

- Benjamin Hale (author) (born 1983), American writer
- Benjamin Hale (philosopher), American environmental philosopher and ethicist
- Benjamin Hale Settle (born 1947), American judge
