= ARRIVE guidelines =

Guidelines for improving standards in animal research

The ARRIVE guidelines (short for Animals in Research: Reporting In Vivo Experiments) are a set of guidelines for improving experimental design and reporting standards for animal research, drawn up by the National Centre for the Replacement, Refinement and Reduction of Animals in Research. First published in 2010 as a checklist of 20 items, a revision, titled ARRIVE 2.0, was published in 2020 as two checklists of 10 "essential" items and 11 "recommended" items. While the guidelines have been endorsed by over a thousand scientific journals, their adoption and enforcement has remained limited.

== Origin ==
A 2009 review of the quality of experimental design, analysis, and reporting methods of animal research conducted by the National Centre for the Replacement, Refinement and Reduction of Animals in Research (NC3Rs) found that most biomedical journals were providing little or no guidance on how animal research should be analyzed and reported, outside of ethical guidelines for experimental design, such as the Three Rs. Additionally, it found issues with the way animal research is reported, with large proportions of articles not stating a hypothesis or objective of the study, lacking specifics about the characteristics of the animals used, not having used techniques such as randomization or blinding to reduce experimental bias, and not fully describing statistical methodology or providing measures of the precision or variability of the results. Additionally, while other fields had existing reporting guidelines for reducing methodological and statistical biases and improving reproducibility, such as MIAME, PRISMA, and the CONSORT statement, no such guidelines existed for animal studies.

In response, NC3Rs put together a working group to develop the ARRIVE guidelines, which included researchers and statisticians from multiple fields, and journal editors from Nature Cell Biology, Science, Laboratory Animals, and the British Journal of Pharmacology. This initial revision of the guidelines was a checklist of 20 items intended to cover the "minimum information that all scientific publications reporting research using animals should include," such as specific details about the animals used, their living conditions, and the experimental, statistical, and analytical methods used in the study. The guidelines were written using the CONSORT statement, a general-purpose 25-item checklist of recommendations for reporting randomized trials, as a basis.

== Initial adoption ==
By 2016, over 600 journals had endorsed the guidelines, with over 150 endorsing the guidelines in 2015 alone; by 2020, that number risen to over a thousand. Despite this, multiple studies between 2014 and 2018 found that the guidelines had been largely ignored by researchers and had made little impact in the general quality of reporting of papers published after the guidelines were issued. Surveys conducted in China in 2017 and 2019 found that only 9.4% and 13.1% of journals were aware of the guidelines, and none specifically directed their authors to follow the guidelines. This low level of adoption by reviewers and researchers was partially attributed to the amount of effort required from journals and editors to check and enforce the guidelines; the original list's 20 items were made up of multiple sub-items, resulting in effectively 38 items to follow. The lack of adoption was also attributed to a lack of awareness from researchers of the significance of incomplete reporting.

== Revision ==
In 2020, in response to low levels of adoption & enforcement of the guidelines, an international working group, supported by NC3Rs, published ARRIVE 2.0, a revision of the ARRIVE guidelines. The revision was intended to clarify the guidelines for researchers, to prioritize the most important items to make enforcement by journal editors and reviewers more manageable, and to provide context & reasoning for the importance of each guideline. The most significant change from the original ARRIVE guidelines was the splitting of the checklist into two separate checklists – an "Essential 10", which encompasses the "basic minimum" that must be included in a manuscript for its findings to be assessed reliably, and a "Recommended Set", which encompasses items that add context and helpful details to a manuscript.

Meta-analyses of studies in the fields of peritoneal dialysis and orthodontics have found that adoption and enforcement of the revised guidelines continues to be sub-optimal.
