= Three Rs (animal research) =

Principles for ethical use of animals in science

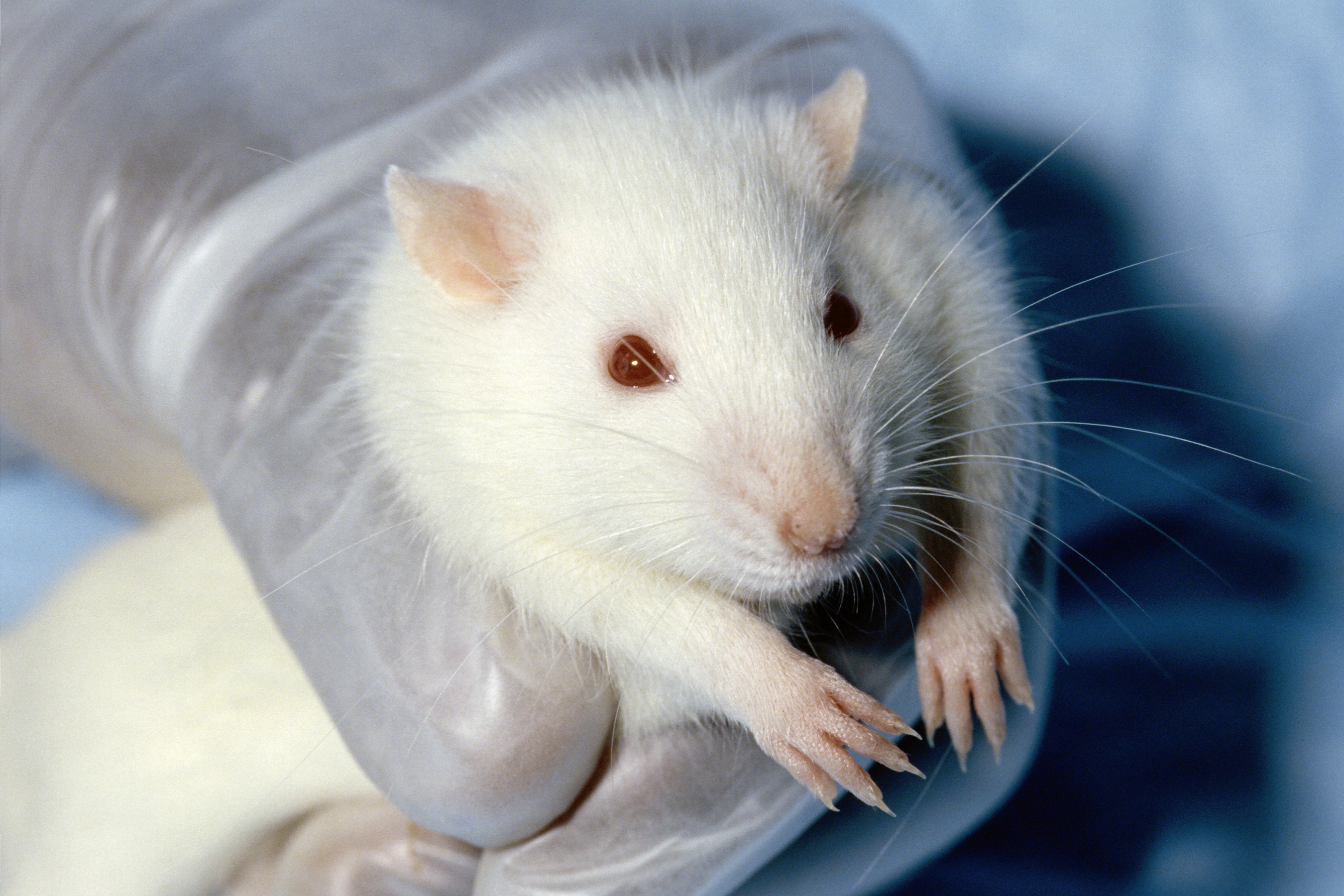
A Wistar laboratory rat

The Three Rs (3Rs) are guiding principles for more ethical conduct in product testing and scientific research in relation to the use (or ideally non-use) of animals. They were first described by W. M. S. Russell and R. L. Burch in 1959. The 3Rs are:

1. Replacement: methods which avoid the use of animals in research, increasingly referred to in regulatory frameworks as New Approach Methodologies or Non-Animal Methods (NAMs).
2. Reduction: use of methods that enable researchers to minimise the number of animals necessary to obtain reliable and useful information.
3. Refinement: use of methods that alleviate or minimize potential pain, suffering, distress, or lasting harm and improve welfare for the animals used.

The 3Rs have a broader scope than simply encouraging alternatives to animal testing, but aim to improve animal welfare and scientific quality where the use of animals cannot be avoided. In many countries, these 3Rs are now explicit in legislation governing animal use. It is usual to capitalise the first letter of each of the three 'R' principles (i.e. 'Replacement' rather than 'replacement') to avoid ambiguity and clarify reference to the 3Rs principles.

== History ==
In 1954, the Universities Federation for Animal Welfare (UFAW) decided to sponsor systematic research on the progress of humane techniques in the laboratory. In October of that year, William Russell, described as a brilliant young zoologist who happened to be also a psychologist and a classical scholar, and Rex Burch, a microbiologist, were appointed to inaugurate a systematic study of laboratory techniques in their ethical aspects. In 1956, they prepared a general report to the Federation's committees, and this report formed the nucleus of the book which was completed at the beginning of 1958. Over much of the period they worked with a special Consultative Committee, chaired by Professor Peter Medawar.

As a contribution to the centenary of The Origin of Species, the quotations at the head of each chapter are all from the works of Charles Darwin.

== Scope and development ==
A common misconception of the 3Rs is that they refer only to replacement; however, their scope is much broader. Moreover, while the 3Rs were designed for research on laboratory animal models, their implementation has been encouraged also in farmed animals and wildlife conservation research.

Replacement: In the original book, the 3Rs were restricted, arbitrarily, to vertebrates. Russell and Burch discussed the possibility of suffering with reference to sentience. They used the term "replacement technique" for any scientific method using non-sentient material to replace methods which use conscious living vertebrates. This non-sentient material included higher plants, microorganisms, and the more degenerate metazoan endoparasites which, they argued, had nervous and sensory systems that were almost atrophied. They acknowledged that the arbitrary exclusion of invertebrates meant that in several contexts, these species could be considered as possible replacements for vertebrate subjects; they termed this "comparative substitution". Russell and Burch also considered levels of replacement. In "relative replacement", animals are still required, though during an experiment they are exposed, probably or certainly, to no distress at all. In "absolute replacement", animals are not required at all at any stage.

Replacement strategies include:

1. Tissue culture
2. Perfused organs
3. Tissue slices
4. Cellular fractions
5. Subcellular fractions

More recent interpretations of the replacement principle suggest the preferred use of non-animal methods over animal methods whenever it is possible to achieve the same scientific aims, i.e. invertebrates are not considered suitable replacements for vertebrates. However, others such as the National Centre for the Replacement, Refinement and Reduction of Animals in Research (NC3Rs) advocate the use of some invertebrates in replacement studies. Therefore, the term 'Replacement' can refer to the use of a supposedly less sentient species, as in "relative replacement".

Russell and Burch writing six decades ago could not have anticipated some of the technologies that have emerged today. One of these technologies, 3D cell cultures, also known as organoids or mini-organs, have replaced animal models for some types of research. In recent years, scientists have produced organoids that can be used to model disease and test new drugs. Organoids grow in vitro on scaffolds (biological or synthetic hydrogels such as Matrigel) or in a culture medium. Organoids are derived from three kinds of human or animal stem cells—embryonic pluripotent stem cells (ESCs), adult somatic stem cells (ASCs), and induced pluripotent stem cells (iPSCs). These organoids are grown in vitro and mimic the structure and function of different organs such as the brain, liver, lung, kidney, and intestine. Organoids have been developed to study infectious disease. Scientists at Johns Hopkins University have developed mini-brain organoids to model how COVID-19 can affect the brain. Researchers have used brain organoids to model how the Zika virus disrupt fetal brain development. Tumoroids—3D cell cultures derived from cells biopsied from human patients—can be used in studying the genomics and drug resistance of tumors in different organs. Organoids are also used in modeling genetic diseases such as cystic fibrosis, neurodegenerative diseases such as Alzheimer's and Parkinson's, infectious diseases such as MERS-CoV and norovirus, and parasitic infections such as Toxoplasma gondii. Human- and animal-cell-derived organoids are also used extensively in pharmacological and toxicological research.

Reduction: Reduction refers to methods which minimise the number of animals used per study. Russell and Burch suggested a reduction in the number of animals used could be achieved in several ways. One general way in which great reduction may occur is by the right choice of strategies in the planning and performance of whole lines of research. A second method is by controlling variation amongst the animals used in studies, and a third method is careful design and analysis of studies. With the advent, development and availability of computers since the original 3Rs, large data-sets can be used in statistical analysis, thereby reducing the numbers of animals used. In some cases, by using previously published studies, the use of animals can be totally avoided by avoiding unnecessary replication. Modern imaging techniques in conjunction with new statistical analysis methods also allow reductions in the numbers of animals used, for example, by providing greater information per animal.

Refinement: Russell and Burch wrote "Suppose, for a particular purpose, we cannot use replacing techniques. Suppose it is agreed that we shall be using every device of theory and practice to reduce to a minimum the number of animals we have to employ. It is at this point that refinement starts, and its object is simply to reduce to an absolute minimum the amount of distress imposed on those animals that are still used." Amongst areas of experiments that can be refined are the procedure to be used, the appropriateness of the species (its suitability for the procedure and its responses to a laboratory environment in general), as well as key aspects such as animal husbandry and management, environmental enrichment, anesthesia and analgesia protocols, experimental endpoint design, and the selection of appropriate euthanasia methods.

Refinements techniques may include:

1. Non-invasive techniques
2. Appropriate anaesthetic and analgesic regimes for pain relief
3. Training animals to voluntarily co-operate with procedures (e.g. blood sampling) so that they have greater control over the procedure reduce distress
4. Provision of species-appropriate housing and environmental enrichment which meet the animals' physical and behavioural needs (e.g. providing opportunities for nesting for rodents)

The definition of Refinement has evolved from that provided by Russell and Burch. A newer definition is now commonly accepted: "any approach which avoids or minimises the actual or potential pain, distress and other adverse effects experienced at any time during the life of the animals involved, and which enhances their wellbeing." Refinement encompasses not only the direct harms associated with animal use, but the indirect, or contingent harms associated with breeding, transportation, housing and husbandry.

== Criticism ==
Some have criticized the Three Rs for what they call "ambiguities" and tensions in the understanding and implementation of different prongs of the approach –Refinement, Reduction and Replacement. This is, in part, because different stakeholders (e.g. animal experimenters, institutional figures, policy makers, activists and the public) may interpret the Three Rs differently. The 3Rs principles do not address some issues, such as the ethics of using animals in research and focus instead on improving the humane use of animals which are used.

Others have noted that promotion of the 3Rs has failed to reduce the number of animals used in experiments. However, this may be the result of a misunderstanding of the definition of 'Reduction', not an absolute reduction in the number of animals used, but a reduction in the number of animals used per study. By its nature, it is difficult to estimate the number of animals not used in scientific procedures as a result of Replacement or Reduction techniques however, despite the rapid increases in medical research, animal numbers have not increased at the same rate.

In a review of dozens of articles involving mice in prolonged pain experiments, researchers found "there were no references to the '3Rs'" which in turn "raise serious questions about whether the 3Rs' principles of Replacement, Reduction, and Refinement are being appropriately implemented by researchers and institutions". The researchers continued,

That the 3Rs or any of the 3Rs' components—Replace, Reduce, or Refine—were not mentioned in any of the... studies suggests that prolonged mouse pain researchers may be unaware of or indifferent to the 3Rs framework and that this aspect is not considered relevant in the peer review process of manuscripts for scientific journals... [T]he growing proportion of the number of studies...in this paper suggests that adherence to guidelines and/or animal use committee requirements is not translating into significant progress from a reduction or replacement perspective.

Following a review of the quality of experimental design in published journal articles, including the use of the 3Rs, it was found that the use and reporting of these principles was sporadic. As a result, the ARRIVE (Animal Research: Reporting of In Vivo Experiments) guidelines were developed and published in 2010. The ARRIVE guidelines present a 20-point list of items which must be reported in publications which have used animals in scientific research, including sample size calculations, explicit descriptions of the environmental enrichment employed and welfare-related assessments made during the study. Many journals now require authors to comply with the ARRIVE guidelines in the preparation of manuscripts. A follow-up review published in 2014 found that there were still low reporting levels of some elements, such as reporting of appropriate statistical methods and the avoidance of bias.

In a survey of scientists in Portugal who had recently undergone training in the Three Rs, researchers found that a "surprisingly large number of researchers were unaware of the 3Rs principle, even those who had worked with animal models for over 10 years" and that subsequent training in the Three Rs "did not change perceptions on the current and future needs for animal use in research", but did increase knowledge of the application of the 3Rs The authors found that the training they provided "appear to have little influence on researchers' acceptance of replacement alternatives to animal use".

== Organisations ==
There are a number of organisations which promote the implementation of the 3Rs and methods that avoid the use of animals in research. Amongst the earliest is FRAME (the Fund for the Replacement of Animals in Medical Experiments) in the UK, established in 1969. The ZEBET (Zentralstelle zur Erfassung und Bewertung von Ersatz- und Ergänzungsmethoden zum Tierversuch) was founded in Germany in 1989, as the first governmental institution with the mandate to reduce animal experiments on a scientific basis. The United Kingdom's Home Office led the Inter-Departmental Group on Reduction, Refinement and Replacement, which aims to improve the application of the 3Rs and promote research into alternatives, reducing the need for toxicity testing through better sharing of data, and encouraging the validation and acceptance of alternatives.The Group reported to Ministers that there was support for a body which would act as a means to better publicise and coordinate what is already done by way of research into the 3Rs. In May 2004, the NC3Rs was announced in the UK to act as a focal point for research into the 3Rs. Although the principles of the 3Rs were implicit in UK law under the Animals (Scientific Procedures) Act (1986), the Directive 2010/63/EU governing animal use within the European Union makes the principles explicit and researchers must demonstrate the use of Replacement, Reduction and Refinement techniques in research involving animals. The Directive introduced a new level of transparency to help progress towards eventually replacing animal use in science and was instrumental in accelerating the concrete application of the 3Rs and the establishment of institutions and centres dedicated to dissemination, education and research based on the Principles across Europe. To date there are such centres in Austria, Belgium, Denmark, Germany, Ireland, Italy, Luxembourg, the Netherlands, Norway, Span, Sweden and Switzerland.

== Alternatives ==
=== In vitro testing ===
Human cells and tissues cultured in the lab are used to make in vitro models, which provide a better representation of human biology. They are already taking over for animals in toxicity and drug discovery.

=== In silico testing ===
In silico testing uses computer simulations, algorithms, and predictive models to study biological processes, chemical interactions, and drug effects.

== See also ==
- Bateson's cube
