= Frederick Stratten Russell =

English marine biologist

- Born: 3 November 1897; Bridport, England, British Empire
- Died: 5 June 1984 (aged 86)
- Education: Cambridge University
- Children: William
- Awards: Linnean Medal (1961); Fellow of the Royal Society
- Scientific career
- Fields: Marine biology
- Workplaces: Marine Biological Association

Sir Frederick Stratten Russell DSC DFC FRS (3 November 1897 – 5 June 1984) was an English marine biologist.

Russell was born in Bridport, Dorset, and studied at Gonville and Caius College, Cambridge. From 1924 he worked for the Marine Biological Association in Plymouth, becoming its director in 1945. He was elected to the Royal Society in 1938, was awarded the Linnean Medal in 1961, and knighted in 1965. The National Marine Biological Library at the Marine Biological Association retains much of Russell's scientific and personal papers for the period 1921-1984.

Russell studied the life histories and distribution of plankton. He also discovered a means of distinguishing between different species of fish shortly after they have hatched. He was the author of The Medusae of the British Isles (1953–1970). He served in both World Wars, being awarded, among others, the Distinguished Flying Cross.

He was the father of W. M. S. Russell.

== Taxon named in his honor ==
- Russell’s dragonet, Callionymus russelli C. R. Johnson, 1976
