= Patrick Bateson =

English biologist

Sir Patrick Bateson FRS
- Born: Paul Patrick Gordon Bateson; 31 March 1938
- Died: 1 August 2017 (aged 79)
- Education: Westminster School, University of Cambridge (BA, PhD)
- Known for: Bateson's cube
- Awards: Frink Medal (2014)
- Scientific career
- Fields: Ethology; Plasticity
- Workplaces: University of Cambridge; Stanford University
- Thesis: The Development of Filial and Avoidance behaviour in the domestic chicken (1963)
- Doctoral advisor: Robert Hinde
- Doctoral students: Mark H. Johnson

Sir Paul Patrick Gordon Bateson, FRS (31 March 1938 – 1 August 2017) was an English biologist with interests in ethology and phenotypic plasticity. Bateson was a professor at the University of Cambridge and served as president of the Zoological Society of London from 2004 to 2014.

== Education ==
Bateson was educated at Westminster School and King's College, Cambridge where he was awarded a Bachelor of Arts degree in zoology in 1960 and a PhD for research on animal behaviour supervised by Robert Hinde.

== Career and research ==
Bateson was a biologist who specialised in researching the behaviour of animals and how it is influenced by genetic and environmental factors. He was a world authority on imprinting in birds – the process of learning to recognise their parents and members of their own species – and his work led to new principles in behavioural development.

Bateson devised original experiments that showed how characteristics of imprinting depend on the bird's early life experiences. Bateson's investigation of learning in birds has led to greater understanding of the neural basis of memory. He had an interest in how developmental and behavioural processes influence evolution.

Bateson was concerned with the ethics of using animals in research and the analysis of animal pain and suffering. This led to a study exploring the effects hunting with hounds had on red deer, an inquiry into dog breeding, and a review of the use of animals in research.

Previous academic positions include a Harkness Fellowship at Stanford University and ten years as head of the Cambridge sub-department of Animal Behaviour. Bateson served five years as biological secretary to the Royal Society and fifteen years as provost of King's College, Cambridge, retiring from both in 2003. He retired from his Cambridge Chair in 2005.

Bateson published on such topics as ethology, animal welfare, behavioral development and evolution.

=== Selected publications ===
- Growing Points in Ethology, with Robert Hinde (1976)
- Mate Choice (1983)
- The Development and Integration of Behaviour (1991)
- Assessment of Pain in Animals (1991)
- Behavioural Mechanisms in Evolutionary Perspective (1992)
- Measuring Behaviour, with Paul Martin (3rd edition 2007)
- The Behavioural and Physiological Effects of Culling Red Deer (1997)
- Perspectives in Ethology (series)
- Design for a Life, with Paul Martin (1999); 2000 hbk ISBN 0-684-86932-2; 2001 pbk ISBN 0-684-86933-0
- "Innateness and the sciences", with Matteo Mameli (2006), Biology & Philosophy, https://doi.org/10.1007/s10539-005-5144-0
- Independent Inquiry into Dog Breeding (2010)
- Review of Research using Non-Human Primates (2011)
- "An evaluation of the concept of innateness", with Matteo Mameli (2011), Philosophical Transactions of the Royal Society, https://doi.org/10.1098/rstb.2010.0174
- Plasticity, Robustness, Development and Evolution, with Peter Gluckman (2011)
- Patrick Bateson; Paul Martin (2013). Play, Playfulness, Creativity and Innovation. Cambridge University Press. doi:10.1017/CBO9781139057691.003. ISBN 978-1107015135.
- Patrick Bateson (2017). Behaviour, Development and Evolution. Open Book Publishers. doi:10.11647/obp.0097. ISBN 978-1-80064-516-5.

=== Awards and honours ===
Bateson was knighted for services to science in the 2003 Birthday Honours list. He received an Honorary Doctor of Science (ScD) degree from the University of St Andrews and an honorary fellowship from Queen Mary University of London.

He was elected a Fellow of the Royal Society (FRS) in 1983. In 2014 he received the Frink Medal from the Zoological Society of London.

== Personal life ==
Patrick Bateson's grandfather's cousin was the geneticist William Bateson. Patrick's daughter is Melissa Bateson, also a professor of ethology, at Newcastle University. Patrick Bateson was an atheist. He died on 1 August 2017 at the age of 79.

Academic offices
Preceded by Bernard Williams	Provost of King's College, Cambridge; 1988–2003	Succeeded by Judith Mayhew
