= George Alberti =

British doctor

Professor Sir George Alberti FRCP FRCPE FRCS FRCPath

Professor of Medicine, University of Newcastle upon Tyne
- In office 1985–2002

Professor of Clinical Biochemistry and Metabolic Medicine, University of Newcastle upon Tyne
- In office 1978–1985

Professor of Chemical Pathology and Human Metabolism, University of Southampton
- In office 1973–1978

Personal details
- Born: Kurt George Matthew Mayer Alberti; 27 September 1937 (age 88) Koblenz, Germany

Sir Kurt George Matthew Mayer Alberti (born 27 September 1937, according to Who's Who, in Koblenz, Germany) is a British doctor. His long-standing special interest is diabetes mellitus, in connection with which he has published many research papers and served on many national and international committees. He was President of the European Association for the Study of Diabetes (EASD) and President of the International Diabetes Federation (IDF). In the 1970s, Alberti published recommendations for the management of diabetic ketoacidosis, a serious metabolic emergency which affects people suffering from severe insulin deficiency. This 'Alberti regime' rationalised the use of insulin and fluid therapy in this condition to the undoubted benefit of many patients.

Alberti served as national clinical director for emergency access from September 2002 to March 2009. He has been professor and dean of medicine at the University of Newcastle upon Tyne and president of the Royal College of Physicians.

Alberti drove controversial changes to emergency care in the UK, leading to some hospitals losing their status as emergency care centres.

== Personal life ==
Alberti first married in 1964 and had three sons with his first wife. In 1998, he married Stephanie Amiel.

== Education ==
- Balliol College, Oxford (MA; DPhil 1964; BM BCh 1965; Honorary Fellow 1999).

== Career ==
- Research Fellow, Harvard University, 1966–69
- Research Officer, Department of Medicine, Oxford University, 1969–73
- Professor of Chemical Pathology and Human Metabolism, University of Southampton, 1973–78
- Professor of Clinical Biochemistry and Metabolic Medicine, University of Newcastle, 1978–85
- Professor of Medicine, Newcastle upon Tyne, 1985–2002 (Dean of Medicine, 1995–97)
- Professor of Metabolic Medicine, Imperial College London, 1999–2002
- National Clinical Director for Emergency Access, 2002–2009
- Chair of King's College Hospital NHS Foundation Trust, 2011–2015
- Senior Research Investigator, Imperial College, London, 2002–

== Honours ==
- Fellow of the Royal College of Physicians (president, 1997–2002)
- Fellow of the Royal College of Physicians of Edinburgh
- Fellow of the Royal College of Pathologists
- Fellow of King's College London
- Member, World Health Organization Expert Advisory Panel on Diabetes, 1979–
- President, International Diabetes Federation, 2000-03 (Vice-President, 1988–94)
- Vice-Chairman, British Diabetic Association, 1996–99
- Vice President, Diabetes UK, 2000–
- Founder FMedSci 1998 (Member of Council, 1998–2002)
- Knight Bachelor for services to Diabetic Medicine in the New Year Honours 2000
- Member of the Advisory Council of the Campaign for Science and Engineering

Academic offices
Preceded by Sir Leslie Turnberg	President of the Royal College of Physicians; 1997–2002	Succeeded by Carol M. Black
