= W. M. S. Russell =

British zoologist, originator of the 3Rs concept

- Born: 26 March 1925; Plymouth, Devon, England
- Died: 2006 (aged 80–81)
- Occupation: Zoologist

William Moy Stratton Russell (26 March 1925 – 2006), also known as Bill Russell, was an English zoologist and animal welfare worker. He was best known for writing, along with R. L. Burch (1926-1996) The Principles of Humane Experimental Technique (1959), a landmark in the humane use of animals in research, education and testing. Russell and Burch introduced the concept of the Three Rs (replacement, reduction and refinement) in the scientific community and provided a blueprint for combining animal welfare considerations and quality of research.

== Early life ==
Bill Russell was born in 1925 in Plymouth. His father, Sir Frederick Stratten Russell, was the Director of the Marine Biological Association of the United Kingdom. At the age of seventeen Bill started to study classics at Oxford, but one year later he joined the army. In the autumn of 1944 his battalion was sent to Northwest Europe. Places he served included the area of Druten, the Netherlands.

After the war Bill continued to study Classics and English Literature at Oxford but switched later on to Zoology, with Peter Medawar (later Sir Peter Medawar, Nobel Prize Winner Physiology, 1960) as tutor. In 1952 he defended his thesis on endocrinology and behaviour of the South African clawed frog, Xenopus laevis. As part of his thesis study he developed, together with Richard Murray, a more humane method of killing this species and introduced, for the first time in ethology, Sir Ronald Fisher’s method of experimental design and statistical analysis. He also studied psychology and worked for some time as an agricultural research fellow at Oxford.

== Career ==
From 1954 to 1959 he worked, together with Rex Burch, on a project funded by UFAW (Universities Federation for Animal Welfare). The founder of UFAW, C. W. Hume, described Bill Russell as "a brilliant young zoologist who happens to be also [a] psychologist and a classical scholar". As the result of this project the Principles of Humane Experimental Technique was published in 1959. In the UK the Fund for the Replacement of Animals in Medical Experiments (FRAME), established in 1969, was among the first to recognize the importance of the Three Rs concept. In the years thereafter, recognition of the concept increased, first gradually but later on exponentially, when centres on animal alternatives were established in several parts of the world and also a series of World Congresses on Alternatives and Animal Use in the Life Sciences was started.

After publication of the book Bill worked for five years in private practice as a psychoanalyst and for two years as scientific information officer at the Commonwealth Bureau of Pastures and Field Crops, where he learned Japanese with the aim to understand the contents of agricultural publications from Japan.

In 1966 he was appointed as a lecturer at the Department of Sociology, University of Reading, teaching several disciplines such as sociology, statistics, genetics and cultural evolution. He became Reader in 1971 and Professor in 1986.

He was not aware of the growing impact of the book until the early nineties, when Marty Stephens, vice-president of the Humane Society of the United States (HSUS), took the initiative to institute the Russell and Burch Award for advancement of the Three Rs in science and Alan Goldberg, director of the Johns Hopkins Center for Alternatives to Animal Testing (CAAT), invited Bill and his wife Claire to participate as guests of honour in the First World Congress on Alternatives and Animal Use in the Life Sciences in Baltimore. They accepted the invitation. Bill announced the next World Congress in Utrecht with a song, paraphrasing Cole Porter's "Another Op'nin, Another Show" from the musical Kiss Me, Kate.

Singing was one of his trademarks. Already from the time that he was lecturer in Reading he used to present parts of his lectures in rhyming songs to the tunes of Gilbert and Sullivan. These were also the years that he earned great popularity in Great Britain by his original approach and through singing answers to some of the questions in BBC radio's Round Britain Quiz. For eight years he was a regular contestant on this programme, representing the West of England.

Bill Russell published many research papers and several books on quite different subjects. Together with Claire he published Human Behaviour (Little, Brown, 1961), Violence, Monkeys and Man (Macmillan, 1968), and Population Crisis and Population Cycles (1999). He also published a science fiction novel The Barber of Aldebaran (1995), wrote the introduction to The Myths of Greece and Rome (2000) and was a past president of the Folklore Society (and a regular contributor to their newsletter).

In 1990, Russell became an Emeritus Professor at the University of Reading and continued writing and publishing until his death in 2006.

== Legacy ==
The three Rs have been globally influential, including in Canada and India. In 2004, in response to a House of Lords Select Committee report informed by Russell's work, the UK launched the National Centre for the Replacement, Refinement and Reduction of Animals in Research NC3Rs. Russell work has also been influential in shaping EU legislation.
