= Lawrence M. Hinman =

American philosopher

- Born: September 26, 1944 (age 82)

Education
- Education: Loyola University of Chicago (Ph.D.)
- Thesis: Nietzsche’s Philosophy of Play (1975)
- Doctoral advisor: Hans Seigfried

Philosophical work
- Era: 21st-century philosophy
- Region: Western philosophy
- Institutions: University of San Diego
- Main interests: moral philosophy

Lawrence Michael Hinman (born September 26, 1944) is an American philosopher and Professor Emeritus of Philosophy at the University of San Diego. He is known for his expertise on moral philosophy.

== Books ==
- Ethics: A Pluralistic Approach to Moral Theory. Fifth Edition. Belmont, CA: Wadsworth, 2013
- Contemporary Moral Issues: Diversity and Consensus .Fourth Edition. Upper Saddle River, NJ: Prentice-Hall, 2012
