= Bateson's cube =

Cost-benefit analysis of animal research

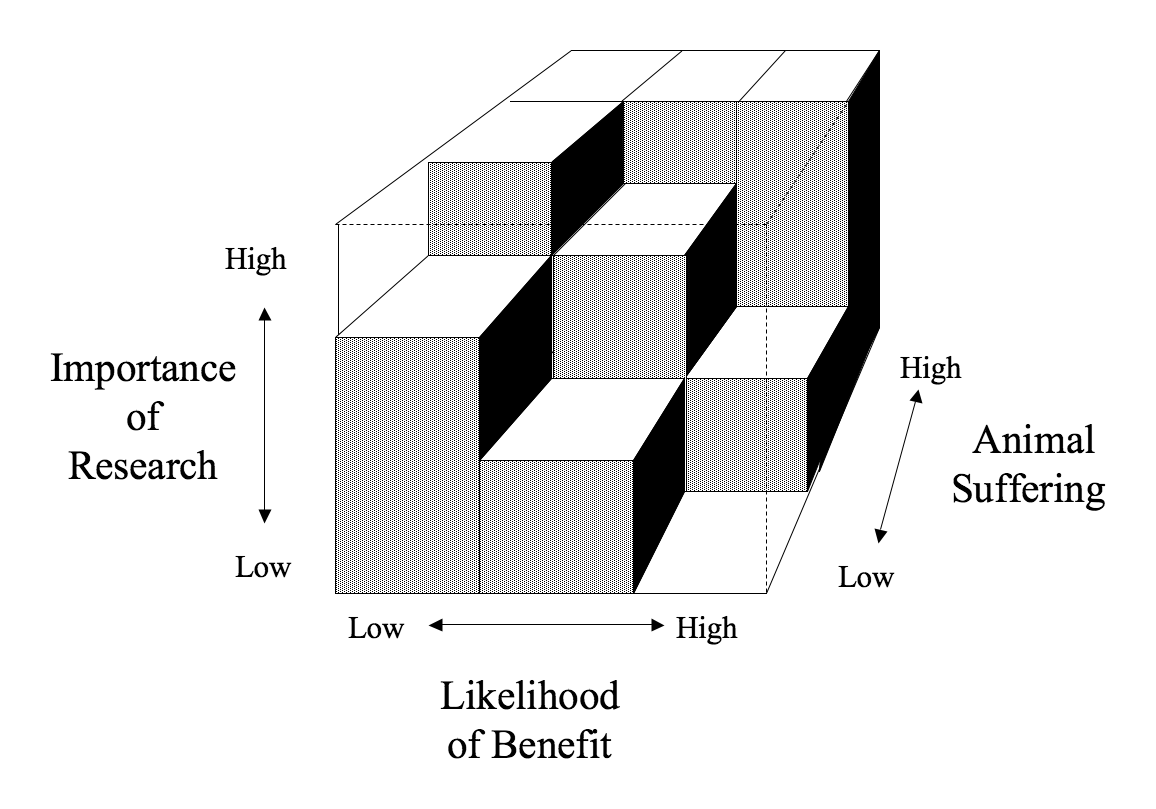
Illustration of Bateson's cube with three axes: animal suffering, likelihood of benefit, and importance of research

Bateson's cube is a model of the cost–benefit analysis for animal research developed by Patrick Bateson, president of the Zoological Society of London.

== Background ==
Bateson's cube evaluates proposed research through three criteria:

- the degree of animal suffering,
- the likelihood of finding benefit,
- the medical importance of the research

Bateson suggested that research that does not meet these requirements should not be approved or performed, in accordance with the Animals (Scientific Procedures) Act 1986. It is not intended as a formal model for optimal trade-offs, but rather a tool for making judicial decisions, since the three axes are not in a common currency. The third criterion also does not necessarily have to be medical benefit, but could be a wider form of utility.

Bateson's cube has three axes measuring suffering, certainty of benefit, and importance of research. If the research is considered important, certain to be beneficial, and not going to inflict suffering, then it will fall into the hollow section meaning research should proceed. Painful, less important research with lower likelihood of success will be lower back in the solid area, and should not proceed. Most research will not be clear-cut, but the guiding principle is 'hollow' should continue, 'solid' should not.
