= Thomas Pieber =

Endrocrinologist

- Born: 25 May 1961 (age 65)
- Education: University of Graz
- Awards: Somogyi Award (2010); Walter Herzig Award (1989); The EFSD and the Novo Nordisk Foundation Precision Diabetes Medicine Award (2021)
- Scientific career
- Fields: Endocrinology; Diabetes
- Workplaces: Medical University of Graz
- Website: Prof Thomas R. Pieber

Thomas Rudolf Pieber (born 25 May 1961) is an Austrian clinical specialist in endocrinology and diabetes. He is Professor of Medicine, Head of the Division of Endocrinology and Metabolism and Chairman of the Department of Internal Medicine at the Medical University of Graz. He is also Director of the Institute of Biomedicine and Health Sciences at Joanneum Research.

Born in Salzburg, Austria, he graduated with an MD from the University of Graz in 1987.

Recently his research has also addressed the role of 15-hydroxy-vitamin D in immune tolerance and autoimmunity.

He received the Walter Herzig Award from the Austrian Diabetes Association in 1989, and the Somogyi Award from the Hungarian Diabetes Association in 2010. In 2021 he was awarded The EFSD and the Novo Nordisk Foundation Precision Diabetes Medicine Award.

He is a member of the Scientific Advisory Board of Arecor Therapeutics plc.

== Selected publications ==
He has an h-index of 103 according to Google Scholar.

- Hovorka R, Canonico V, Chassin LJ, Haueter U, Massi-Benedetti M, Federici MO, Pieber TR, Schaller HC, Schaupp L, Vering T, Wilinska ME. Nonlinear model predictive control of glucose concentration in subjects with type 1 diabetes. Physiological measurement. 2004 Jul 22;25(4):905. (Cited 1298 times)
- Prietl B, Treiber G, Pieber TR, Amrein K. Vitamin D and immune function. Nutrients. 2013 Jul;5(7):2502-21. (Cited 789 times)
- Horvath K, Jeitler K, Berghold A, Ebrahim SH, Gratzer TW, Plank J, Kaiser T, Pieber TR, Siebenhofer A. Long‐acting insulin analogues versus NPH insulin (human isophane insulin) for type 2 diabetes mellitus. Cochrane Database of Systematic Reviews. 2007(2). (Cited 555 times)
- Marso SP, McGuire DK, Zinman B, Poulter NR, Emerson SS, Pieber TR, Pratley RE, Haahr PM, Lange M, Brown-Frandsen K, Moses A. Efficacy and safety of degludec versus glargine in type 2 diabetes. New England Journal of Medicine. 2017 Aug 24;377(8):723-32. (Cited 499 times)
- Pilz S, Tomaschitz A, Ritz E, Pieber TR. Vitamin D status and arterial hypertension: a systematic review. Nature reviews cardiology. 2009 Oct;6(10):621. (Cited 514 times)
- Eisenberg T, Abdellatif M, Schroeder S, Primessnig U, Stekovic S, Pendl T, Harger A, Schipke J, Zimmermann A, Schmidt A, Tong M. Cardioprotection and lifespan extension by the natural polyamine spermidine. Nature Medicine. 2016 Dec;22(12):1428-38. (Cited 522 times)
