= Laboratory Animals (journal) =

- Discipline: Animal testing
- Language: English
- Edited by: P. Jirkof, A. Lang, J. Lopez-Tremoleda, J.-P. Mocho, J. Sánchez Morgado

Publication details
- History: 1967–present
- Publisher: SAGE Publishing on behalf of Laboratory Animals Ltd.
- Frequency: Bi-monthly
- Open access: Hybrid
- Impact factor: 1.3 (2023)

Standard abbreviations
- ISO 4: Lab. Anim.

Indexing
- CODEN: LBANAX
- ISSN: 0023-6772 (print); 1758-1117 (web)
- LCCN: sf78000754
- OCLC no.: 989824498
- OCLC no.: 46842204

Links
- Journal homepage; Online access; Online archive

Laboratory Animals is a bimonthly peer-reviewed scientific journal published by SAGE Publishing. Established in 1967, its focus is on laboratory animal science, technology, welfare, and medicine, with a focus on the care of research animals. The journal published on a semi-annual basis from its inception to 1971, on a triannual basis from 1972 to 1974, and on a quarterly basis from 1975 to 2015; it has published on a bimonthly basis since 2016. It is the official journal of the Federation of European Laboratory Animal Science Associations and a number of its member associations.

As of 2024, its editors-in-chief are Paulin Jirkof, Annemarie Lang, Jordi Lopez-Tremoleda, Jean-Pierre Mocho, and José Sánchez Morgado.

According to the Journal Citation Reports, the journal has a 2023 impact factor of 1.3.
