= National Centre for the Replacement, Refinement and Reduction of Animals in Research =

British organization

The National Centre for the Replacement, Refinement and Reduction of Animals in Research (NC3Rs, pronounced as "N C 3 Rs") is a British organization with the goal of reducing the number of animals used in scientific research. It is named after the three Rs principles, first described in 1959, for reducing the scale and impact of animal research. It was established in 2004 after the publication of a 2002 House of Lords select committee report on Animals In Scientific Procedures As of 2021, the chief executive of NC3Rs is Dr Vicky Robinson, who was appointed CBE in the 2015 Birthday Honours "For services to Science and Animal Welfare".

== See also ==
- ARRIVE guidelines
