= Benjamin Hale (philosopher) =

Benjamin S. Hale (born 1972) is an environmental philosopher and ethicist at the University of Colorado Boulder. He is author of the books A Philosopher Looks at the Weather (Cambridge 2026) and The Wild and the Wicked: On Nature and Human Nature (MIT Press: 2016), co-editor of the Routledge Companion to Environmental Ethics (2022), general editor of the Routledge Environmental Ethics Book Series, co-editor of the journal Ethics, Policy & Environment, and former officer (VP, 2013-16; President, 2016-2019) of the International Society for Environmental Ethics. From 2019-2020 he was the Interim Director of the Bruce D. Benson Center for the Study of Western Civilization and from 2006-2008 he was Director of the Philosophy Department's Center for Values and Social Policy..
