= Timeline of Earth Liberation Front actions =

The Earth Liberation Front (ELF) has carried out various criminal actions in defense of the environment since 1992. Actions were rarely publicized prior to 1996 and are therefore difficult to find.

== 1997 ==
- 11 March 1997, Sandy, Utah: A series of pipe bombs and one firebomb claimed jointly by the ALF and the ELF destroys four trucks and leveled the offices of the Agricultural Fur Breeders Co-Op, causing about $1 million in damage.
- 14 March 1997, near Eugene, Oregon: Tree spiking at Robinson-Scott timber harvest site in the McKenzie River watershed, Willamette National Forest . Joint ALF / ELF claim.
- 18 March 1997, Davis, California: The "Bay Area Cell of the Earth X ALF" takes credit for setting fire to the University of California, Davis, Center for Comparative Medicine facility, which was still under construction.
- 21 July 1997, Redmond, Oregon : Arson attack on the Cavel West meat packing plant. The plant was in the business of slaughtering horses and then shipping the meat to Europe to be sold there. Estimated cost over $1 million. The plant was never rebuilt. Joint ALF / ELF claim.
- 29 November 1997, Burns, Oregon: Fire at the Bureau of Land Management Wild Horse Corrals destroys a horse barn, chutes, pens and equipment, and 400 horses are released. ELF and ALF claim joint responsibility. Damages: $474,000.

== 1998 ==
- 2 June 1998, Olympia, Washington: The U.S. Department of Agriculture Animal Damage Control building and another U.S. Department of Agriculture wildlife station, miles apart, go up in flames on the same morning. The Earth Liberation Front and Animal Liberation Front take joint responsibility for both actions. Damages: $1.9 million.
- 28 June 1998, Boston, Massachusetts: ELF defaces the Mexican Consulate in Boston with red paint in support of the indigenous Zapatista Army of National Liberation uprising in the Mexican state of Chiapas. ELF paints blood-red hand prints on the walls, spills pools of red paint on the ground, and paints "VIVA E.Z.L.N."
- 3 July 1998, Middleton, Wisconsin: Break-in and release of 171 mink and ferrets from United Vaccines laboratory during a daylight raid. Holes are cut in the fence and 310 ferrets and mink are released. Equipment and windows are also destroyed. The slogan 'Independence Day for Fur Farm Prisoners' is painted at the United Vaccines laboratory during the daylight raid. Joint ALF / ELF claim.
- 10 October 1998, Rock Springs, Wyoming: Saboteurs cut the locks off horse pens at a BLM corral, freeing about 40-100 wild horses. Failed incendiaries are found next to a pickup truck and a building. The ELF and the ALF take joint responsibility.
- 19 October 1998, Vail, Colorado: The ELF claims responsibility for burning five buildings and four chair lifts at Vail Resorts company's Vail Ski Resort, causing in excess of $12 million in damages. The action came only five days after a court had ruled that Vail could proceed with its planned Category III expansion into the Two Elks Roadless Area, despite the objections of local environmentalists. In a communiqué, ELF claims that the fires were set on behalf of the lynx. "If there is any critical lynx habitat in the state, this is it!"
- 26 October 1998, Powers, Michigan: About 5,000 mink are released from the Pipkorn farm in the Upper Peninsula. Damages: $100,000.
- 26 December 1998, Medford, Oregon : Fire ravages the headquarters of U.S. Forest Industries. An ELF communiqué issued weeks later says the strike was payback to the company for razing forests and killing wild animals for profit. Damages: $700,000.

== 1999 ==
- 7 August 1999, Escanaba, Michigan: Two fishing boats are set ablaze in the driveway of a veterinarian who once worked as a mink rancher. A garage door is tagged with graffiti 18 inches (460 mm) high: "FUR IS MURDER. E.L.F." The ELF later claims in an Internet posting it targeted the veterinarian after finding a "Fur is Enough" sign outside his home. Damages: $15,000.
- 25 December 1999, Monmouth, Oregon: Fire destroys the main office of the Boise Cascade logging company costing over $1 million. ELF claim responsibility in a communiqué.
- 31 December 1999, East Lansing, Michigan: Arson of the offices of Catherine Ives, Room 324, Agriculture Hall at Michigan State University. The offices were doused with gasoline and set afire. ELF says the fire was set in response to the work being done to force developing nations in Asia, Latin America and Africa to switch from natural crop plants to genetically engineered sweet potatoes, corn, bananas and pineapples. USAID was the major funder of the research and promotional work being done through Michigan State University. ELF spokesmen claimed Monsanto had been a major contributor to funding the program, however the only funding from Monsanto Corp. was a one-time sum of $2,000 to send five African students to a conference on biotechnology. According to local newspapers, the fire caused over $1 million in damage.

== 2000 ==
- 23 January 2000, Bloomington, Indiana: Arson destroys a partially built luxury home. Investigators found a message spray-painted in black on a sign near the house: "No Sprawl ELF." The ELF later issues a communiqué saying it torched the home because it was in the Lake Monroe Watershed, which provides drinking water to the city of Bloomington. Damages: $200,000.
- 9 February 2000, Saint Paul, Minnesota: University of Minnesota, ELF Crop Destruction, $1,000+ in damages.
- 24 March 2000, Minneapolis, Minnesota: Highway 55 reroute, $500,000 in damages done to construction equipment.
- 30 April 2000, Bloomington, Indiana: At least six pieces of logging and heavy construction equipment are sabotaged and a trailer full of wood chips is set ablaze at a road construction site just outside the city. A communiqué from the Earth Liberation Front states its plan was to punish those developing wooded areas around Bloomington, which "have turned what was once forested land into parking lots, luxury houses for rich scum and expanded roads." Damages: $75,000.
- 20 July 2000, Rhinelander, Wisconsin: Vandals hack down thousands of experimental trees, mostly poplars, and spray-paint vehicles at a U.S. Forest Service research station. The ELF claims the attack was against bioengineering, although researchers say the trees were naturally bred (not bioengineered) to grow faster and resist diseases. Damages: $1 million.
- 9 September 2000, Bloomington, Indiana: Fire erupts at the headquarters of the Monroe County Republican Party Committee headquarters. Investigators say a flammable liquid was poured on the building and ignited. The arson was a reminder, according to the ELF communiqué, that the ELF would not sit quietly as politicians pushed for plans to extend Interstate 69. Damages: $1,500.
- 18 October 2000, Shoals, Indiana: Vandals find four pieces of heavy logging equipment in the Martin State Forest and cut hoses, slash seats, destroy gauges and pour sand in the engines, fuel tanks and radiators. They leave spray-painted graffiti including, "Earth Raper," "Go Cut in Hell," and "ELF." Damages: $55,000.
- 27 November 2000, Niwot, Colorado: Arson hits one of the first luxury homes going up in a new subdivision. The ELF later sends a note, made of letters clipped from magazines, to the Boulder Weekly newspaper: "Viva la revolution! The Boulder ELF burned the Legend Ridge mansion on Nov. 27th." The underground group explains in a follow-up communiqué that the arson was driven by defeat of a statewide ballot measure to control growth. Damages: $2.5 million.
- 9 December 2000, Middle Island, New York: Fire erupts in a Long Island condominium under construction. The ELF claims responsibility, saying the homes were "future dens of the wealthy elite." The group, announcing "an unbounded war on urban sprawl," claims it checked for occupants—human and animal—in 16 condos before setting incendiaries in them. Damages: $200,000.
- 19 December 2000, Miller Place, New York : A Long Island house under construction goes up in flames. "Building homes for the wealthy should not even be a priority," the ELF writes in its communiqué. "Forests, farms and wetlands are being replaced with a sea of houses, green chemical lawns, blacktop and roadkill." Damages: $50,000.
- 29 December 2000, Mount Sinai, New York : Three Long Island luxury homes under construction are set ablaze, and a fourth is spray-painted with graffiti: "If you build it we will burn it." The ELF issues a communiqué saying: "Recently, hundreds of houses have been built over much of Mount Sinai's picturesque landscape and developers now plan to build a further 189 luxury houses over the farms and forests adjacent to Island Estates...This hopefully provided a firm message that we will not tolerate the destruction of our island." Damages: $160,000.

== 2001 ==
- 21 May 2001, Seattle, Washington: ELF sets off a firebomb that caused $7 million in damages at the University of Washington's Center for Urban Horticulture. Lacey Phillabaum and Jennifer Kolar pleaded guilty to the attack in 2006. Bill Rodgers, who was "considered to be one of the top organizers of the ELF and a hands-on participant who allegedly help set the fire bombs inside the UW horticulture center," later commits suicide in an Arizona jail. Justin Solondz, who allegedly helped assemble the fire bombs and joined Rodgers in setting them is now a fugitive. Briana Waters, a student at The Evergreen State College at the time of the bombing, was convicted in 2008 and sentenced to six years in prison.

== 2002 ==
- 26 January 2002, St. Paul, Minnesota: University of Minnesota Microbial and Plant Genomics Research Center soil testing lab and construction trailer burned down, construction equipment, including a bulldozer damaged, $630,000 damages. Claimed by ELF.
- 29 January 2002, Fairfield, Maine: ELF announced they had sabotaged a "Biotech Park" in a communiqué that read:

We are writing to inform you that there is a Biotech Park being built in Fairfield, Maine. We went there some weeks ago and put a sand/quickcrete mix in the engines, gas, and hydraulics of an excavator and a roller. These were the only machines there, plowing up the land, building bridges over creeks. So we left no trace so when the operators came to work the machines would run and then seize, costing big bucks. Now, we are letting the people know.

The park is being pushed by Paul Tessier, a representative of Fairfield, and others. It is in cohoots with Jackson Labs, which is the largest breeder of mice. They grow mice with human ears there! How sick! These people want the park to be an incubator to bring more biotechnology into Maine.

We oppose this for the following reasons... Biotechnology is one more tool by the ruling class to control our lives and make more money. Only the rich can produce biotechnology and even if that wasn't so, we would want no part of it because it sees the wild as incomplete, or as lacking, needing manipulation. Our ancestors lived in harmony on this planet for a long time, now all of humanity's progress is making us sick. And we're gonna trust those that gave us cancer to create new technologies to cure it. No way!

We want to be left alone. No more development. We enjoy life here and are sick of business men coming in and trying to dupe us into trading the good life for their wage slavery. People!!! Take action!!!

The Biotech Park is on route 201 near Kennebec Valley Technical College in Fairfield. KVTC is in on it too. Solidarity to those fighting against the greedy! ELF...ALF...Together with all

- 12 February 2002, Washington D.C.: FBI testimony before the House Ecoterror Hearing.

Domestic terrorism is the unlawful use, or threatened use, of violence by a group or individual based and operating entirely within the United States (or its territories) without foreign direction, committed against persons or property to intimidate or coerce a government, the civilian population, or any segment thereof, in furtherance of political or social objectives...During the past several years, special interest extremism, as characterized by the Animal Liberation Front (ALF) and the Earth Liberation Front (ELF), has emerged as a serious terrorist threat. The FBI estimates that the ALF/ELF have committed more than 600 criminal acts in the United States since 1996, resulting in damages in excess of 43 million dollars.

- 24 March 2002, Erie, Pennsylvania: Hundreds of trees spiked in Wintergreen Gorge, crane, generators and pumps torched, other equipment monkey wrenched, $500,000 damages Claimed by ELF.
- 12 May 2002, Harbor Creek, Pennsylvania: 200 mink released from Mindek mink farm Claimed by ALF and ELF.
- 11 August 2002, Irvine, Pennsylvania: A device, containing gasoline, was thrown onto the roof of the Northeast Research Station in the Allegheny National Forest. The ensuing fire caused nearly $700,000 in damages. An e-mail from ELF's office said:

While innocent life will never be harmed in any action we undertake, where it is necessary, we will no longer hesitate to pick up the gun to implement justice, and provide the needed protection for our planet that decades of legal battles, pleading protest, and economic sabotage have failed so drastically to achieve.

and that

all other US Forest Services administration and research facilities, as well as all Pennsylvania Department of Conservation and Natural Resources (DCNR) buildings nationwide should now be considered likely targets.

- September 2002, Harbor Creek, Pennsylvania: more than 50 mink released Mindek mink farm Claimed by ALF and ELF.
- 28 September 2002, Richmond, Virginia: 25 windows etched at 1 Burger King and 13 windows etched at each of 2 McDonald's Claimed by ELF.
- 1 November 2002, Richmond, Virginia: Vandals who left messages crediting ELF damaged SUVs in several incidents recently. Twenty-five SUVs on the lot of a Ford dealer were permanently defaced with a glass-etching cream. A week later, SUVs parked near homes were severely damaged with an ax or hatchet. Vandalism and attempted arson have also been reported recently at highway and home construction sites in the area.
- 28 December 2002, Philadelphia, Pennsylvania: ELF activists attacked a housing development, severely damaging construction vehicles and the model home on the property.

== 2003 ==
- 1 January 2003, Girard, Pennsylvania: Jugs of gasoline were set under three vehicles at Bob Ferrando Ford Lincoln Mercury and set ablaze. Two pickup trucks, one Sport Utility Vehicle (SUV) and a car were destroyed causing $90,000 in damages. Steve Dartnell of Fairview Pennsylvania claimed responsibility for the attack.
- 20 January 2003, Seattle, Washington: Arson at a McDonald's caused $5000 worth of damage. In September, 2005, Christopher W. McIntosh of Maple Shade, NJ, admitted he set the fire by pouring several gallons of gasoline on the roof on behalf of ALF-ELF. In an anonymous phone call he said:

[t]here was an E-L-F-A-L-F hit at McDonald's across from the Space Needle. There will be more. ... As long as Mother Earth is pillaged, raped, destroyed. As long as McDonald's keeps hurting our furry brothers, there will be more.

He was sentenced to eight years in prison.

- 21 March 2003, Superior Township, Michigan: Two luxury homes set on fire in a Superior Township housing development in an action against urban sprawl. Claimed by the ELF. Damages estimated at $400,000.
- 28 March 2003, Montgomery, Alabama: Five government vehicles were vandalized and one truck was set on fire at a Naval Recruitment Headquarters in Montgomery, Alabama. The ELF claimed responsibility for the attacks both in a communiqué and by spray-painting their initials at the scene. Messages that read, "Stop the War," "Stop killing" and "Leave Iraq" were also found along with the ELF initials.
- 8 April 2003, Santa Cruz, California: The ELF claims responsibility for vandalizing 65 SUVs, including about twenty private vehicles as well forty at the North Bay Ford and Lincoln Mercury car dealership. Messages are spray-painted on the vehicles denouncing the war in Iraq.
- 15 April 2003, Santa Cruz, California: ELF activists attack 15 SUVs with bright orange paint, and in an ELF press release, complain that the local paper did not cover the story.
- 3 June 2003, Chico, California: ELF claims the attempted arson of a new home. The fire burns through a PVC pipe holding water, dousing the flames so the damage was minimal, about $100. "Save our bio-region ELF" is painted on the sidewalk.
- 4 June 2003, Macomb County, Michigan: ELF sets fire to two luxury homes in a Macomb County housing development in an action against urban sprawl. "ELF" and "Stop sprawl" are spray painted on nearby construction equipment. Damages estimated at $700,000.
- 5 June 2003, Chico, California: An arson attempt is made at a shopping center under construction. Workers find remnants of several small fires, and ELF spray-painted on the door of a work truck at the site. The FBI explores connections with arson attempts at two McDonald's in March, and SUVs in May, in Chico.
- 14 June 2003, Santa Cruz, California: Environmental activists scratch the slogan ELF into ten new SUVs, causing $15,000 worth of damage.
- 2 July 2003, South Windsor, Connecticut: Signs of the Earth Liberation Front, "ELF" and "no sprawl," are spray-painted on a newly completed. An unidentified man called police and said the graffiti was done by an ELF activist.
- 1 August 2003, San Diego, California: A 206-unit condominium being built is burnt down causing damage in excess of $50 million. A 12-foot (3.7 m) banner at the scene reads "If you build it, we will burn it," signed, "The E.L.F.s are mad."
- 22 August 2003, West Covina, California: The ELF attacks several car dealerships in east suburban Los Angeles, burning down a warehouse and vandalizing several cars, with such phrases as "I love pollution" written on the cars. All told, more 125 SUVs and Hummers, which were targeted due to their lower than average fuel efficiency, are damaged or destroyed causing $2.3 million in damages.
- 29 August 2003, Fairbanks, Alaska: ELF spray-paints concrete walls and construction equipment at a Wal-Mart construction site.
- 4 September 2003, Santa Fe, New Mexico: ELF action against SUV dealer in New Mexico - SUVS spray-painted with messages naming the seven deadly sins. 1/3 of the dealership's stock was marked, leaving thousands of dollars in damages.
- 12 September 2003: Federal agents arrest Pomona, California resident Joshua Thomas Connole in connection with the 22 August 2003 Los Angeles area arsons. He was soon released due to lack of evidence. The FBI later awards Connole $100,000 and agrees to give him an apology after he files a lawsuit against the agency.
- 19 September 2003, San Diego, California: ELF action against urban sprawl at three separate construction sites in the upscale Carmel Valley neighborhood of San Diego, causing an estimated $1 million in damages. Four unfinished houses were destroyed, two others were damaged and a condominium under construction sustained minor damage. A banner at the site of the first fires read, "Development = destruction. Stop raping nature. The ELFs are mad."
- 22 September 2003, Martiny, Michigan: The ELF claims responsibility for planting plastic bottles containing flammable liquid at an Ice Mountain Spring Water Company (a subsidiary of Nestle) pumping station. The devices are apparently intended to start a fire at the premises but are discovered by maintenance workers before they are set ablaze. In a written statement, the ELF stated:

We will no longer stand idly be while corporations profit at the expense of all others. To this end, we have taken action against one of the pumping stations that Perrier uses to steal water… Clean water is one of the most fundamental necessities and no one can be allowed to privatize it, commodify it, and try and sell it back to us.

Two months later a judge orders the company to halt pumping water from the wells. Nestle had been removing 200 gallons of water from the ground per minute and was lowering the water table.

- 6 October 2003, Jemez Mountains, New Mexico: Construction equipment belonging to the US Forest has electrical wires cut, tires cut and windows broken by ELF.
- October (mid), 2003; Portland, Maine: The Acadian Green Brigade of the ELF slashes the tires of 8 Boise Cascade delivery trucks and two trailers, glued locks and painted slogans across the building's main entrance.
- 24 October 2003, Martinsville, Indiana: ELF activists sabotage a Wal-Mart construction site. Survey stakes are removed, and walls and machinery spray-painted. Over a dozen pieces of heavy machinery and vehicles are vandalized, with slashed tires, cut fuel hoses, and sand poured in fuel tanks.

== 2004 ==
- 22 January 2004, Fayetteville, Arkansas: Five Hummer SUVs are vandalized. The letters ELF are spray-painted on the vehicles, tires are slashed and windows broken.
- 7 February 2004, Charlottesville, Virginia: The ELF sets fire to a bulldozer and causes damage to other equipment that is parked off Route 29. This site is to be developed into a retail, commercial and residential community. On their website, the ELF writes that the site was "targeted as part of the ELF's ongoing actions against large-scale developments going up at the expense of what little green space is left in North America." A banner left on the site read "Your construction = long term destruction - ELF" The action causes over $30,000 in damages.
- 17 February 2004, North Lima, Ohio: Vandals break windows in a construction trailer, spray a fire extinguisher and scratch the initials "ELF" on the side of a piece of construction equipment at the construction site of a new showroom for a fireworks company.
- 20 April 2004, Snohomish, Washington: Two homes are destroyed and attempts are made to burn two others at a housing development. A note found at the site of one of the fires is signed "ELF" and reportedly contains statements condemning suburban developments. As well, bottles of flammable liquid are found at two different housing development sites in the area. The action causes an estimated $1 million in damages.
- 30 July 2004, Charlotte, North Carolina: Activists vandalize a fleet of utility trucks owned by Utiliquest, a utility contractor. All the trucks are marked with "ELF" and all have their tires slashed.
- 3 August 2004, Spokane, Washington: A fire heavily damages one $55,000 Hummer SUV and nearly burns two others at the George Gee Hummer dealership. One H2 Hummer has its windows broken and is spray painted with messages that oppose the Iraq war and President Bush. An e-mail sent to local media outlets claims credit for the Eastern Washington Chapter of the Earth Liberation Front.
- 27 December 2004, Lincoln, California: Incendiary devises are located in three houses under construction at the Verdera Models construction site on Flores Court in the Twelve Bridges development. Graffiti is discovered on another house under construction in the same development. The graffiti found at the scene includes notations such as "Enjoy the world as is - as long as you can", "U will pay", "Evasion", "4 Q" and "Leave". This house also sustains broken windows. The letters "ELF" are printed in the cul-de-sac where these homes are located. Across the street from this house a tractor is vandalized with the notation "Disarm or die".

== 2005 ==
- 12 January 2005, Auburn, California: Five un-ignited incendiary devices are discovered in a commercial building under construction that, upon completion, were to be rented as doctor's offices. A letter claiming responsibility for "the actions taken in Placer County (CA)" is received by several media outlets. The return address on the letter indicates it was from "Emma Goldman." Emma Goldman is a major figure in the history of anarchism.
- 7 February 2005, Sutter Creek, California: The ELF sets fire to the new Pinewoods apartment complex, about 45 miles (72 km) east of Sacramento. Sutter Creek Chief of Police Robert Duke says "there were seven individual fires and some kind of incendiary device with very, very crude triggering mechanisms." graffiti found near the fire reads: "We will win -- ELF."
- 6 March 2005, Fair Oaks, California: Three vehicles – two full-size pickup trucks and a Ford Expedition – are spray-painted with the initials "ELF," and their rear license plates are painted over. A total of at least seven SUVs are vandalized in the Sacramento area during the week.
- 13 April 2005, Sammamish, Washington: ELF partially burns down one of two buildings it targeted in a King County, Washington development. David Ammon, a developer whose property was burned, had planned on constructing two more homes in the area. Police discover an incendiary device which had failed to ignite in a second house nearby along with a sheet condemning the rape of the Earth, clearing of trees, and claiming responsibility on behalf of ELF. It reads, "Where are all the trees? Burn, rapist, burn. E.L.F" The homes targeted are new ones located in a golf course subdivision.
- 17 May 2005, Fair Oaks, California: Several SUVs and trucks are spray-painted with "ELF" and "polluter", and many also have their tires slashed. A short distance away, the words "bomb the White House" are found spray-painted on a real estate sign. FBI, Secret Service, and a joint terrorism task force are investigating, and trying to find out if the two attacks are related.
- 27 July 2005 Whatcom County, Washington: Arsonists damage two homes under construction. The first causes $100,000 in damages. The second, a few days later, completely destroys another home being built in the area. ELF has taken credit for other arsons in the area earlier in the year that police are investigating.
- 11 September 2005, West Old Town, Maine: The ELF vandalizes at least a dozen large machines at the West Old Town Landfill. The machines had their ignitions ripped out, or superglue poured into them, tires were slashed, two buildings and many vehicles were spray painted, and the fuel in the equipments' tanks may have been tampered with. Officials say the damage will cost tens of thousands of dollars to repair.
- 3 October 2005, Bozeman, Montana: U.S. - A construction site owned by the Kenyon Noble lumber company is vandalized by the Earth Liberation Front causing about $3000 in damage.
- 19 November 2005, Hagerstown, Maryland: ELF claims responsibility for setting four fires in newly constructed unoccupied homes built by the McLean, Virginia Ryan Homes in the Hager's Crossing subdivision. One building is burned to the ground but the other three sustain less serious damage. The developer estimated the damage at more than $300,000.

Credit for the arson is claimed via an e-mail originating from the address with email ID "tree_beard1234", that is similar to Treebeard - the name of a giant shepherd, one of a race called the Ents, in J.R.R. Tolkien's cult fantasy novel "The Two Towers." The message reads:

Last night we, the Earth Liberation Front, put the torch to a development of Ryan Homes in Hagerstown, Maryland (off Route 40, behind the Wal-Mart). We did so to strike at the bottom line of this country's most notorious serial land rapist...We warn all developers that the people of the Earth are prepared to defend what remains of the wild and the green...We encourage all who watch with sadness while developers sell out the future of us and our children to join us in resisting them in any and every possible way...The Ents are going to war.

- 25 November 2005, Bothell, Washington: Two pieces of construction equipment are destroyed by fire, causing more than $100,000 in damage.
- 29 November 2005, Bothell, Washington: One piece of construction equipment is destroyed by fire.
- 14 December 2005, Kenmore, Washington: Two pieces of excavation equipment are burned overnight at a housing development, causing around $180,000 in damage. Apparently this is the second fire at this construction site since November. The earlier fire caused $50,000 in damage.
- 16 December 2005, Valley Springs, California: A window is broken and the letters E-L-F were spray-painted on the garage door of a partially constructed home. There is considerable opposition to new development and the required re-zoning in rural Calaveras County, where Valley Springs is located.

== 2006 ==
- January 17th, Camano Island, Washington: ELF burns down a nearly completed 9,600-square-foot (890 m^{2}), $3 million, trophy house. Investigators say that someone spray-painted a threatening message on a pink bedsheet and draped it across the front gate.
- January 31st, Guelph, Ontario, Canada: A fire destroys a partially constructed home. ELF claims credit for the blaze a few days later, in an email in which the group explains that the fire had been "A STRIKE AGAINST DEVELOPERS, FOR THE LOCAL COMMUNITY." The statement criticizes city council for approving more than 1,200 new homes "despite the fact there are enough homes already approved to meet the city's needs for seven more years," causing a strain on resources in the area.
- March 11th, Salem, Oregon: Three newly constructed upscale homes are vandalized with pro-environmental slogans which read: "Quit building ant farms," "E.L.F.," "Rent is theft," "Viva E.L.F." and "Don't kill my air." Additionally, a window is broken. According to authorities, this is the second time within the past two years that ELF vandals struck in this neighborhood.
- June 27th, Guelph, Ontario, Canada: A fire destroys a partially constructed home at 75 Summit Ridge, in view of the old Eastview Road landfill site. It caused about $200,000 of damage. ELF claims credit for the blaze a few days later in an email which includes anti-sprawl slogans.

== 2008 ==
- March 3rd, Street of Dreams, Washington: ELF is the primary suspect for the intentional destruction, by using explosive devices, set fire to four multimillion-dollar homes from the 2007 Seattle Street of Dreams in Woodinville, Washington, costing $7 million in damage. Authorities describe the act as "domestic terrorism" after finding the initials of the Earth Liberation Front spray-painted in red letters, mocking claims that the homes were environmentally friendly: "Built Green? Nope black! McMansions in RCDs r not green. ELF."
- From November 25th to 28th, Mexico City, Mexico: a group calling itself eco-anarquista por el ataque directo (Eco-anarchist cell for direct attack) claimed responsibility for a number of recent actions, including: half a dozen Molotov cocktails thrown at tren férreo (metro rail) in Mexico City, Incendiary sabotage against Telmex, a Molotov cocktail thrown at a Banamex ATM. These attacks were claimed to have taken place "as a form of 'protest' against the construction of a new rail line (line 12), in Mexico City (D.F.) and Mexico State; already because of its construction many trees were cut down, entire families evicted and land expropriated with large hectares of green areas subsequently deforested."

== 2009 ==
- January 29th, Mexico City, Mexico: The Frente de Liberación de la Tierra (ELF) claimed responsibility for setting a fire within the College of Sciences and Humanities at Universidad Nacional Autónoma de México (UNAM) along with setting fire to and destroying a construction crane. this was in response to the university building upon an ecological reserve.
- March 22nd, Guadalajara, Jalisco, Mexico: Frente de Liberación de la Tierra (ELF) set fire to construction equipment and broke windows of a local bank.
- September 4th, Everett, Washington: The ELF claims responsibility for the destruction of two broadcasting towers used by the local radio station KRKO.

== See also ==
- Timeline of Animal Liberation Front actions
- ELF and ALF cooperation
