= Radical environmentalism =

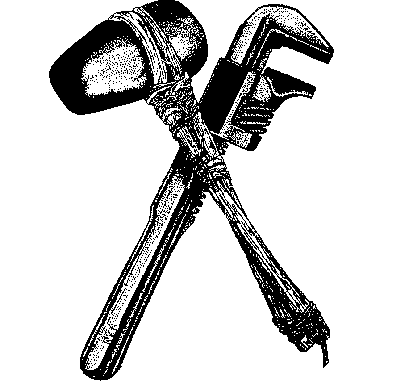
The symbol of Earth First! is a monkey wrench and stone hammer.

Radical environmentalism is a grass-roots branch of the larger environmental movement that emerged from an ecocentrism-based frustration with the co-option of mainstream environmentalism.

== As a movement ==
=== Philosophy ===
The radical environmental movement aspires to what scholar Christopher Manes calls "a new kind of environmental activism: iconoclastic, uncompromising, discontented with traditional conservation policy, at times illegal". Radical environmentalism presupposes a need to reconsider Western ideas of religion and philosophy, including capitalism, patriarchy, and globalization, sometimes through "resacralising" and reconnecting with nature.

The movement is typified by leaderless resistance organizations such as Earth First!, which subscribe to the idea of taking direct action in defense of Mother Nature including civil disobedience, ecotage and monkeywrenching. Movements such as the Earth Liberation Front (ELF) and Earth Liberation Army (ELA) also take this form of action, although focusing on economic sabotage, rather than civil disobedience. Radical environmentalists can include earth liberationists, as well as anarcho-primitivists, animal liberationists, bioregionalists, deep ecologists, eco-nationalism, ecopsychologists, green anarchists, and less often anti-globalization and anti-capitalist protesters, ecofeminists, neo-Pagans, Third Positionists, and Wiccans.

=== History ===
While many people believe that the first significant radical environmentalist group was Greenpeace, which made use of direct action beginning in the 1970s to confront whaling ships and nuclear weapons testers, others within the movement, argues as Earth Liberation Front (ELF) prisoner Jeff "Free" Luers, suggests that the movement was established centuries ago. He often writes that the concept of "eco-defence" was born shortly after the existence of the human race, claiming it is only recently that within the modern development of human society, and individuals losing touch with the earth and its wild roots, that more radical tactics and political theories have emerged.

The alternative tactic of using explosive and incendiary devices was established in 1976 by John Hanna and others as the Environmental Life Force (ELF), also now known as the original ELF. The group conducted a campaign of armed actions in northern California and Oregon, later disbanding in 1978 following Hanna's arrest for placing incendiary devices on seven crop-dusters at the Salinas, California airport on May Day, 1977. It wasn't until over a decade and a half later that this form of guerrilla warfare resurfaced as the Earth Liberation Front using the same ELF acronym.

In 1980 Earth First! was founded by Dave Foreman and others to confront environmental destruction, primarily of the American West. Inspired by the Edward Abbey novel The Monkey Wrench Gang, Earth First! made use of such techniques as treesitting and treespiking to stop logging companies, as well as other activities targeted towards mining, road construction, suburban development and energy companies. The organization were committed to nonviolent ecotage techniques from the group's inception, with those that split from the movement in the 1990s including the Earth Liberation Front (ELF) in 1992, naming themselves after the Animal Liberation Front (ALF) who formed in the 1970s. Three years later in Canada, inspired by the ELF in Europe the first Earth Liberation direct action occurred, but this time as the Earth Liberation Army (ELA), a similar movement who use ecotage and monkeywrenching as a tool, although no guidelines had been published.

The ELF gained national attention for a series of actions which earned them the label of eco-terrorists, including the burning of a ski resort in Vail, Colorado in 1998 that the ALF also claimed credit for —and the burning of an SUV dealership in Oregon in 1999. The defendants in the case were later charged in the FBI's "Operation Backfire", along with other arsons and cases, which were later named by environmentalists as the Green Scare; alluding to the Red Scare, periods of fear over communist infiltration of U.S.

Following the September 11, 2001 attacks several laws were passed increasing the penalties for ecoterrorism, and hearings were held in Congress discussing the activities of groups such as the ELF. To date no one has been killed as a result of an ELF or ALF action since both groups forbid harming human or non-human life. It was then announced in 2003 that "eco-terrorist" attacks, known as "ecotage", had increased from the ELF, ELA and the "Environmental Rangers", another name used by activists when engaging in similar activity. In 2005 the FBI announced that the ELF was America's greatest domestic terrorist threat, responsible for over 1,200 "criminal incidents" amounting to tens of millions of dollars in damage to property, with the United States Department of Homeland Security confirming this regarding the ALF and ELF.

Plane Stupid then was launched in 2005, in an attempt to combat the growing airport expansions in the UK using direct action with a year later the first Camp for Climate Action being held with 600 people attending a protest called Reclaim Power converging on Drax Power Station in North Yorkshire and attempted to shut it down. There were thirty-eight arrests, with four breaching the fence and the railway line being blocked.

Radical environmentalism has been called a new religious movement by Bron Taylor (1998). Taylor contends that "Radical environmentalism is best understood as a new religious movement that views environmental degradation as an assault on a sacred, natural world."

Some writers have used it to refer to the hypothetical danger of future dystopian governments, which might resort to fascist radical environmentalist policies in order to deal with environmental issues. Themes of eco-fascism and radical environmentalism can be found in movies and literature like Soylent Green, The Hunger Games, Z.P.G., and My Diary from 2091. Research analyzing 32 commercially and culturally significant fiction film portrayals of radical environmentalism—released between 1972 and 2023—found that depictions tended to show more extreme acts of environmentally-motivated violence, like eco-tage and eco-terrorism, as morally illegitimate, with more recent and commercially successful films tending to favor binary hero–villain characterizations over morally complex narratives.

=== Offshoots ===
Several philosophies have arisen from ideas in radical environmentalism that include deep ecology, ecofeminism, social ecology and bioregionalism.

Deep Ecology is attributed to Arne Naess and is defined as "a normative, ecophilosophical movement that is inspired and fortified in part by our experience as humans in nature and in part by ecological knowledge."

A rising Deep Ecologist among radical environmentalist circles is Pentti Linkola, regarded as the founder of ecofascism, and author of the book Can Life Prevail? A Radical Approach to the Environmental Crisis.

Ecofeminism originated in the 1970s and draws a parallel between the oppression of women in patriarchal societies and the oppression of the environment.

Social Ecology is an idea attributed to Murray Bookchin, who argued that in order to save the environment, human society needed to copy the structure of nature and decentralize both socially and economically.

Bioregionalism is a philosophy that focuses on the practical application of Social Ecology, and theorizes on "building and living in human social communities that are compatible with ecological systems".

== See also ==
- Anarchism and animal rights
- Anarcho-primitivism
- Deep ecology
- Deep Green Resistance
- Earth liberation
- Ecoterrorism
- Ecofascism
- Eco-nationalism
- Ecotage
- Environmental crime
- Extinction Rebellion
- Green syndicalism
- Greenwashing
- Guerrilla gardening
- Planet of the Humans
- Sexecology
- Social ecology
- Veganarchism
