= Darren Thurston =

Canadian environmentalist

- Born: Darren Todd Thurston c. 1970 (age 55–56)
- Occupation: Former activist
- Status: Deported to Canada following expiration of sentence
- Conviction: Eco-sabotage related charges
- Penalty: 37 months in prison

Darren Todd Thurston (born c. 1970) is a former Canadian animal rights activist.

In July 2006, Thurston pleaded guilty to criminal conspiracy and related arson charges that occurred from 1996 through 2001 in Oregon and four other U.S. states, and which were claimed in the name of the Earth Liberation Front (ELF) and the Animal Liberation Front (ALF). The FBI arrested Thurston and 10 other members of a west coast-based animal rights and environmentalist organization that the FBI and media called "The Family." The arrests were made as part of the FBI's Operation Backfire.

Thurston was sentenced in May 2007 to 37 months in prison in exchange for his cooperation with the investigation.

== Charges and convictions ==
In 1992, Thurston was convicted for his part in an Animal Liberation Front action at a University of Alberta laboratory and liberating 29 cats slated for medical experimentation. For this act and another earlier action, he served 2 1/2 years in a Canadian prison and was released in 1994.

In 1998, Thurston was charged along with former ALF spokesman David Barbarash relating to a series of threatening letters that were booby-trapped with razor blades and sent to hunting-guide outfitters across British Columbia. In late 2000, charges against Thurston were stayed by the Crown following a refusal by the Royal Canadian Mounted Police (RCMP) to release certain records.

On December 7, 2005, Thurston was arrested in Portland, Oregon, in the company of Chelsea Gerlach. Although he was initially told he would receive a speedy deportation, he was later indicted in a case involving 16 individuals alleged to have been involved in 17 Earth Liberation Front, Animal Liberation Front and other unclaimed actions that took place between 1996 and 2001. These arrests took place as part of the Federal Bureau of Investigation's Operation Backfire, referred to in the activist community as part of an ongoing trend known as the Green Scare.

Thurston was facing five federal charges including arson with an incendiary device and conspiracy in addition to two federal charges for the possession of fraudulent identification. In 2007, Thurston was sentenced to 37 months of imprisonment for his role in an attack on a Bureau of Land Management corral in Litchtfield, California. He was given BOP #69110-065 and served his sentence at FCI Sheridan. Following his release, he was deported to Canada.

== See also ==
- Animal Liberation Front Supporters Group (ALFSG)
- Behind the Mask (2006 film)
- Earth Liberation Prisoner Support Network (ELPSN)
- Eco-Terrorism
- List of animal rights advocates
