= Will Potter =

American journalist (born 1980)

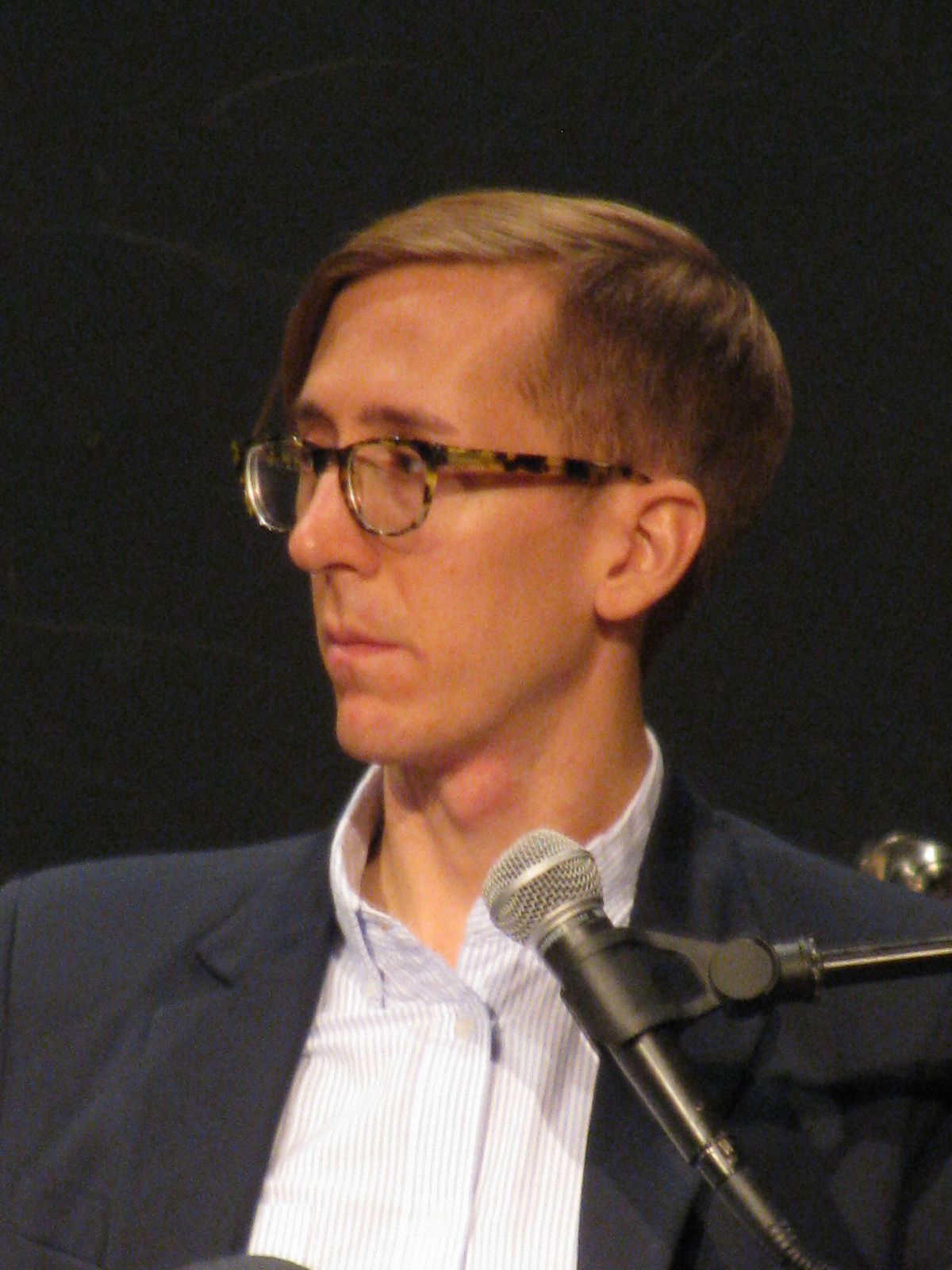
- Potter at Busboys and Poets, 2013
- Born: 1980 (age 45–46)
- Education: Johns Hopkins University; UT Austin
- Occupation: Journalist
- Website: willpotter.com

Will Potter (born 1980) is an American investigative journalist and public speaker. From 2016 to 2017, he was the Marsh Visiting Professor of Journalism at the University of Michigan. He has written for several publications, including the Chicago Tribune, The Dallas Morning News, and Legal Affairs. In his writings, he has focused on how the "war on terrorism" affects civil liberties. He has become a leading critic of the US government's Green Scare tactics, through his website, GreenIsTheNewRed.com. He has written several articles on this topic, as well as participating in conferences and giving lectures at universities, with some of his papers used in courses. In 2006, he spoke to the U.S. Congress about his reporting on these issues, and in 2008 his article about the Animal Enterprise Terrorism Act, was discussed in the book, Censored 2008, as one of the top 25 overlooked news stories of 2007. Potter is also a TED Fellow, having given a talk about communication management units.

In 2025 Potter published Little Red Barns, described in a Washington Post review as "an impassioned and thoroughly researched examination of factory farming and how it harms animals, the planet and us. [The book is based on Potter's] epic, emotionally and physically draining 10-year investigation into American factory farms — also known as CAFOs, “concentrated animal feeding operations” — and the dedicated activists seeking to expose the mass suffering within."

== Education ==
Potter received a master's degree in writing from the Johns Hopkins University. He graduated summa cum laude from the University of Texas at Austin in 2002 with a degree in journalism.

== Green Scare ==
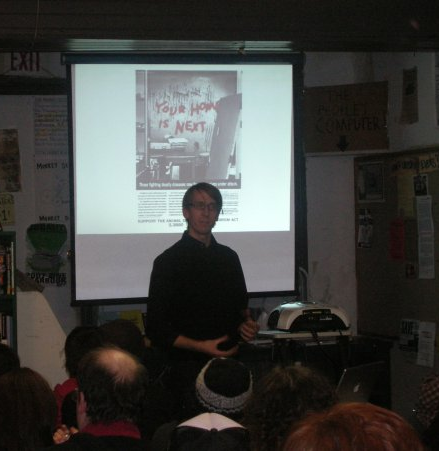
Will Potter presentation at Green Scare Event, Wooden Shoe Books, Philadelphia

Potter sees a parallel between the branding of current activists as "terrorists", and the use of the media in sensationalizing these cases, and the persecution of leftists in the Red Scare, during the McCarthy era. According to him, the Green Scare is a new phenomenon associated with environmentalist groups that may or may not engage in illegal activities, but are disproportionately attacked by the government for extra-legal reasons. He thinks that these government tactics are a threat to civil liberties which can progressively affect more groups and individuals.

He believes that labeling individuals as "terrorists" is being used as a fear tactic to discredit and suppress peaceful activists. He points out the obvious differences between what is generally accepted as terrorism and the tactics of certain activists. He believes the real motivation for this "terrorist" characterization is the defense of corporate profit and control over social activism. Potter believes that the targeting of animal rights and earth liberation movements, considered the number one domestic terrorist threat by the FBI, has nothing to do with security. He warns of repression extended to other groups protected by the First Amendment, in the future. He makes clear that he does not excuse acts considered criminal or say that they should not be prosecuted by law.

In 2006, Potter spoke to Congress about the Animal Enterprise Terrorism Act. He explained why he does not believe that pushing for a broader basis of prosecution among activists will deter the more radical fringe. He says they are motivated by ideology and not fear. Also, he called attention to the erosion of civil liberties for peaceful activists, while stressing the harm done in the name of state control and not security.

== Works ==
- Green is the New Red (City Lights, 2011) ISBN 978-0-87286-538-9
- Little Red Barns: Hiding the Truth, from Farm to Fable (City Lights, 2025) ISBN 9780872869141

== Criticism ==
Potter has become the target of a group accusing him of defrauding the public through a 2014 Kickstarter campaign. The campaign raised USD 75,064 to fund a project to buy a drone to capture aerial footage of factory farms for investigative reporting on "ag-gag" laws. Potter has made numerous public statements to address the delays in the project, namely an expansion of the project that include a paperback book to be released by a publisher in 2018. In March 2018 the TED organization and their legal team reviewed financial documents for the project and dismissed the fraud claims, stating publicly: “We have looked into the allegations and are satisfied that the accusations against him are unfounded. More specifically we’ve reviewed detailed records of how he has spent the money raised for this project. We are certain he has made appropriate use of the funding as he continues to carry out a challenging project, and that the finished project will meet the high standard of work for which he is known. We completely stand by Will, and he will continue to be a TED Senior Fellow."

== Other ==
Potter appears in the 2014 documentary film Cowspiracy. He also delivers a spoken-word track about eco-terrorism called "We Will Never Forget" on punk band Rise Against's Record Store Day exclusive The Eco-Terrorist in Me. The record's eponymous track is said to be inspired by Potter's book Green Is the New Red.

== Awards ==
His reporting on the Animal Enterprise Terrorism Act has been recognized by Project Censored “for outstanding investigative journalism,” as one of the top 25 “stories that didn’t make the news in 2007". He has also received the Mark of Excellence award for feature writing, presented by the Society of Professional Journalists, and recognition from Scripps Howard, Lantern Books and the Press Club of Dallas.
