= If a Tree Falls: A Story of the Earth Liberation Front =

2011 documentary film

If a Tree Falls
- Promotional poster
- Directed by: Marshall Curry
- Written by: Marshall Curry; Matthew Hamacheck
- Produced by: Marshall Curry; Sam Cullman
- Cinematography: Sam Cullman
- Edited by: Matthew Hamacheck; Marshall Curry
- Music by: James Baxter; The National
- Distributed by: Oscilloscope Laboratories
- Release dates: January 21, 2011 (Sundance); June 22, 2011 (United States)
- Running time: 85 minutes
- Language: English

If a Tree Falls: A Story of the Earth Liberation Front is a 2011 American documentary film by filmmaker Marshall Curry. It tells the story of activist Daniel G. McGowan of the Earth Liberation Front (ELF), from his first arson attacks in 1996 to his 2005 arrest by the Department of Justice. The film also examines the ethics of the ELF and the nature of eco-terrorism.

Premiering at the 2011 Sundance Film Festival, If a Tree Falls was rapidly acclaimed by critics as many considered it one of the best documentaries of 2011 for its thought-provoking portrayal of complex environmental and political issues. It won a number of awards and was nominated for an Academy Award for Best Documentary Feature.

== Plot ==
Daniel McGowan first became involved with the ELF in 1996.

The Department of Justice launched Operation Backfire to find the arsonists.

In 2006, McGowan was arrested.

Signing a plea agreement, he was sentenced to 7 years in prison.

== Production ==
Director Marshall Curry knew Daniel McGowan through his wife's work. McGowan did not strike him as the terrorist type, so after his 2006 arrest, he was intrigued to find out what led him to his radical course of action.

== Release ==
If a Tree Falls: A Story of the Earth Liberation Front premiered at the 2011 Sundance Film Festival, where it won the award for Best Documentary Editing. Oscilloscope Laboratories would subsequently pick it up for theatrical distribution.

PBS broadcast the film on September 13, 2011, as part of its POV series.

=== Reception ===
On the review aggregator website Rotten Tomatoes, 88% of 33 critics' reviews are positive, with an average rating of 7/10. The website's consensus reads: "Rooted in the trials of a fast-moving reality, If a Tree Falls: A Story of the Earth Liberation Front deftly connects to a larger system with care and attention." Metacritic, which uses a weighted average, assigned the film a score of 65 out of 100, based on 14 critics, indicating "generally favorable" reviews.

Kenneth Turan of the Los Angeles Times called it "one of the best documentaries of the year" and The New York Times said it was "an extraordinary documentary... [a] fearless exploration of complexity in a world drawn to oversimplified depictions of events and problems, heroes and villains."

The various organizations involved—including the spokesman for the Earth Liberation Front and the prosecutor who put members of the E.L.F. in prison—also responded favorably.

=== Awards ===
- Academy Award, Best Documentary Feature (nominee)
- Sundance Film Festival, Best Documentary Editing (winner)
- Dallas Film Festival, Environmental Visions Award (winner)
- Miami International Film Festival, Knight Dox Competition Grand Jury Prize (nominee)
- Miami Film Festival, Knight Dox Competition Special Mention (winner)
- Nashville Film Festival, Best Documentary (winner)
- Traverse City Film Festival, Founders Award for Best Documentary (winner)
- Santa Cruz Film Festival, Earthvision Environmental Jury Prize (winner)
- Flagstaff Mountain Film Festival, Best Feature (winner)
- Best Documentary Screenplay from the Writers Guild of America (nominee)
