= Tre Arrow =

American activist (born 1974)

- Born: 1974 (age 51–52)

Tre Arrow (born Michael Scarpitti in 1974) gained prominence in the U.S. state of Oregon in the late 1990s and early 2000s for his environmental activism, bid for Congress as a Pacific Green Party candidate, and then for his arrest and later conviction for committing acts of arson on cement and logging trucks. He unsuccessfully sought political asylum in Canada, and was extradited to Portland, Oregon, on February 29, 2008, to face 14 counts of arson and conspiracy. These actions were claimed as acts of protest by the Earth Liberation Front (ELF). On June 3, 2008, Arrow pleaded guilty to two counts of arson and was sentenced to 78 months in prison. He was released to a halfway house in 2009.

== Background ==
Arrow first came to public attention in July 2000 when he scaled a U.S. Forest Service building in downtown Portland, Oregon and lived on a nine-inch ledge for eleven days, to protest the plan to log near Eagle Creek, Oregon. His protest played an important role in reversing the Forest Service's plans to log the area.

Arrow ran for Congress in 2000 and received 15,000 votes as a Pacific Green Party candidate.

In October 2001, he suffered a broken pelvis, broken ribs and a concussion when he fell 60 feet from a hemlock tree where he had perched to protest a logging sale in Tillamook County.

== Arson incidents ==
Arrow was sought by the FBI in connection with the April 15, 2001, arson at Ross Island Sand and Gravel in Portland. Three trucks were damaged in the amount of $200,000. The Earth Liberation Front (ELF) claimed this fire via a written communique. The U.S. Department of Justice says it considers ELF to be the worst domestic terrorism group.

Another arson occurred a month later at Ray Schoppert Logging Company in Eagle Creek, Oregon, on June 1, 2001. Two logging trucks and a front loader were damaged, resulting in $50,000 worth of damage. The ELF did not claim responsibility, but the explosions were similarly created by milk jugs filled with gasoline, and a fuse made from incense and a pack of matches.

== Arrest and legal proceedings ==
Jacob Sherman, a 21-year-old Portland State University student, was subsequently arrested by the FBI and interrogated on four occasions. About four months after his arrest Sherman admitted to his involvement in both arsons. In order to avoid a potential life sentence in prison, Sherman named three others who had participated in the crimes: Tre Arrow, Angela Marie Cesario and Jeremy David Rosenbloom. Cesario and Rosenbloom decided to enter plea agreements since Sherman had already implicated Arrow. All three entered guilty pleas and while Sherman named the high-profile activist Arrow as the mastermind behind the arsons, Cesario and Rosenbloom disputed this and testified that Jacob himself was the mastermind.

Arrow was indicted by a federal grand jury in Oregon and charged with four felonies for this crime on October 18, 2002. He was listed on the FBI's December 2002 most-wanted list, and appeared on the America's Most Wanted television program.

Arrow fled to Canada, but on March 13, 2004, he was arrested in Victoria for stealing bolt cutters and was also charged with being in Canada illegally. He was in custody in the Vancouver Island Regional Correctional Centre near Victoria where he unsuccessfully fought extradition back to the United States.

Arrow's family and supporters had expressed concern that he could not receive a fair trial in the United States due to character assassination by the media; at least two newspapers have referred to Arrow as an "eco-terrorist", and the FBI held his capture up as an example of its success in prosecuting terrorists in a 2004 report to Congress. Judges in both Canadian and American cases against him have ruled that the term "terrorist" could not be used during the proceedings against him.

Arrow was sentenced August 12, 2008, in Portland Oregon federal court to 78 months in federal prison for his part in two arson attacks in 2001 by U.S. District Judge James A. Redden. Arrow had earlier pleaded guilty, acknowledging he set fire to cement-mixing trucks at Ross Island Sand and Gravel Company in Portland on April 15, 2001, and logging trucks at Schoppert Logging Company in Eagle Creek on June 1, 2001. Arrow’s three co-defendants had each completed 41-month prison terms in 2003. The Judge increased the ordinary 60-month mandatory minimum term for arson based on a finding that Arrow committed the arson attacks in an aggravated manner calculated to influence or affect the conduct of the victims by intimidation, coercion and retaliation.

In June 2009, Arrow entered a halfway house in Portland, Oregon, after a year in federal prison.

On Mar 6, 2012, Arrow was arrested for domestic violence. However, no charges were filed as a result of this incident.

== Candidacy for Portland mayor ==
On March 5, 2012, Arrow submitted a completed nominating petition for the office of mayor of Portland and was added to the register of candidates.

On April 18, 2012, during an environmentally themed Portland mayoral debate, Arrow made a scene and was shouted down by the crowd and asked to return to his seat.

In the non-partisan primary, Arrow placed eighth out of twenty-three candidates with 916 votes, 0.68% of the votes cast.

== See also ==
- Raw veganism
- Jeff Luers - environmentalist sentenced to twenty-two years for SUV arson attacks in Eugene, released after serving ten
- Marius Mason - activist sentenced to twenty-two years for arson as part of the ELF
- Direct action
- Green Scare
- Operation Backfire (FBI)
- Eco-terrorism
