= Resistance: Journal of the Earth Liberation Movement =

Environmental activism magazine

- Type: Political philosophy Direct action
- Format: Quarterly
- Owner(s): n/a
- Founded: 2009
- Political alignment: Earth liberation
- Language: English
- Headquarters: Tempe, Arizona

Resistance: Journal of the Earth Liberation Movement was an environmentalist magazine that was created with the stated aim to "inform, inspire, and energize the earth liberation movement". One of the activists involved was former Earth Liberation Front spokesman, Craig Rosebraugh.

== History and aims ==
The issues carry several articles on the philosophy of direct action in defense of earth liberation, news concerning the struggle and the environmental crisis, practical discussions on strategies and security issues, as well as listing the diary of actions for various earth liberation groups like the Earth Liberation Front and the Animal Liberation Front.

The first issue was published in Summer of 2009. According to their website, the magazine has a worldwide based subscription, and can be found on several mainstream bookstores, such as Borders and Chapters Indigo, as well as hundreds of independent bookstores and Infoshops across the United States and Canada.

Rosebraugh, one of the co-editors, explained in an interview that the magazine was searching a more mainstream distribution in order to create "an effective, diverse and large movement to protect the planet". He believes that when governments and politicians refuse to act to protect it, it is "up to all of us to step in and protect our home." The goal, he says, is to "remove the profit motive that is driving environmental destruction." Rosebraugh says that the magazine "was created to inform readers not only of the dangerous state of the planet, but also the urgency of action."

== See also ==
- Bite Back
- Deep ecology
- Direct action
- Green anarchism
- Monkeywrenching
