= RCD =

RCD may refer to:

== Science and technology ==
- Residual-current device, a safety device that breaks an electrical circuit
- Rabbit calicivirus disease, a disease caused by the Rabbit haemorrhagic disease virus
- Registered clock driver chips, part of registered memory DIMMs
- Resistor-capacitor delay in electronic circuits

== Organisations ==
- Rassemblement Congolais pour la Démocratie (Rally for Congolese Democracy), a rebel group in the Democratic Republic of the Congo
- The Royal Canadian Dragoons, a Canadian Forces armoured regiment
- Rassemblement Constitutionnel Démocratique (Democratic Constitutional Rally), a political party in Tunisia
- Rally for Culture and Democracy, a political party in Algeria
- Regional Cooperation for Development, a former multi-governmental organization of Iran, Pakistan and Turkey

=== Football clubs ===
- RCD Mallorca (Real Club Deportivo or Catalan: Reial Club Deportiu)
- RCD Espanyol de Barcelona
- Real Club Deportivo de La Coruña

== Other uses ==
- Rural cluster development, a form of subdivision of residential housing
- Registered Community design, an industrial design right that covers the European Community
- Recreational Craft Directive, a European Union directive for pleasure boats
- Rochdale railway station, Greater Manchester, England (National Rail station code)
- River-class destroyer (2030s), the Royal Canadian Navy River-class destroyer
