= Prisoner support =

Activities providing assistance to prisoners

Prisoner support encompasses a variety of activities aimed a providing assistance to prisoners, particularly political prisoners. Many programs devoted to this purpose have quite limited resources; for instance, Nottingham Black Prisoner Support, with one staff worker, had 297 active cases in 1999. Black prisoner support groups such as Partners of Prisoners have sought to establish productive working relationships with prison staff. South Carolina's Alston Wilkes Society is the largest statewide prison support organization in the United States, with a budget of $918,000 and a staff of 50. It operates two halfway houses, arbitrates prisoner grievances, maintains a youth home, helps ex-inmates find work, and provides social services to prisoners' families. There are many special-interest prison support groups such as the Out of Control Lesbian Committee to Support Women in Prison.

Some political movements find it to be in their interests to provide prisoner supports; Break the Chains argues, "Any movement that does not support its political internees is a movement destined to fail. When power is challenged, it inevitably turns to violent repression and imprisonment to maintain itself. In order to avoid defeat, movements must become organized and capable of combating the repression of the state apparatus, and they must be able to support their comrades and allies in the event that they are arrested or imprisoned. Few would commit themselves to a movement that would leave them behind prison walls, or a movement that is incapable of sustaining itself in the face of state intimidation." Ratner writes that the prisoner support movement has been hampered by "particularly strong public antipathy toward offenders who would deny culpability by assigning blame to the 'system'. This compromises the efforts of prisoner-support groups, who must rally public support in order to procure government funds. Such groups face the dilemma of rapidly losing their own legitimacy should they draw too closely to the very offenders whom they seek to help — offenders who are not perceived by the public as victims of injustice. Thus, many 'outside' groups are forced to shun the support of inmates who are in prison for violent offences, a serious ideological fracture of inside-outside alliances which limits the possibilities for prisoner politicization."

In the early 2000s, the United States Libertarian Party's California affiliate established a Political Prisoner Support Committee. It mostly served to support medical cannabis patients. Spokesperson Ann McCormick opined, "we need not only to protect and care for our wounded, but to present them as patriots and heroes of 'the people'."

== See also ==
- Anarchist Black Cross
- Earth Liberation Prisoners Support Network
- Vegan Prisoners Support Group
- Prisoner Visitation and Support
- Prison Dharma Network
