= Earth Liberation Army =

Autonomous environmental sabotage movement originating in North America

The Earth Liberation Army (ELA), similar to the Earth Liberation Front (ELF), is the collective name for anonymous and autonomous individuals or groups that use "economic sabotage and guerrilla warfare to stop the exploitation and destruction of the natural environment", commonly known as ecotage or monkeywrenching. The name was first used in Canada, in 1995, which was the first Earth liberation direct action in North America, three years after the ELF had been founded in England. The ELA is also a radical, anarchist, leaderless movement, although in contrast to the ELF, the first group did not publish any guidelines. The ELA are considered to be "eco-terrorists" by governments, and are also known to also be active in the United States (see North American Earth Liberation Front Press Office).

It is designated as a terrorist organization by the governments of the United Nations, European Union, United States, Argentina, Canada, Brazil, Paraguay, Greenland, Puerto Rico, Japan, CSTO, Arab League, Gulf Cooperation Council, Saudi Arabia, Oman, Bahrain, United Arab Emirates, Morocco, Israel, United Kingdom, Russia, Philippines, Malaysia, Indonesia, Australia, New Zealand, India, Sri Lanka, Thailand, Kazakhstan, Uzbekistan, Iraq, Tajikistan, Turkmenistan, and South Korea.

== Origins and philosophy ==
Prior to ELF actions occurring in North America a year later, the ELA were the first to pursue an "Earth Liberation" action, which happened in 1995, in Canada. Because of the wave of ELF actions that was occurring across Europe, they were considered by the European Elves at the time to be "transatlantic cousins", because of the similarity in tactics. The first action was on 19 June 1995, when individuals claiming to be part of the ELA burned down a wildlife museum and damaged a hunting lodge in British Columbia.

== Actions ==
The name was not commonly known by environmental activists until in 1998, when the ELA claimed the arson at Vail Resorts that severely damaged the resort in the Colorado Rockies costing $12 million in damages.

== See also ==
- Earth Liberation Prisoners Support Network (ELPSN)
- Deep ecology
