= Operation Backfire =

Operation Backfire may refer to:

- Operation Backfire (FBI), an American criminal investigation into actions of radical environmental activists around 2004 to 2006
- Operation Backfire (World War II), military scientific operation of the Western Allies in 1945
