= William C. Rodgers =

American activist (1965–2005)

William Courtney Rodgers (1965 – December 21, 2005), also known as Bill Rodgers and Avalon, was an environmental activist, animal rights activist and a co-proprietor of the Catalyst Infoshop in Prescott, Arizona, US. He was one of six environmental activists arrested December 7, 2005 as part of the FBI's Operation Backfire. His charge was one count of arson for a June 1998 fire set by the Earth Liberation Front (ELF) at the National Wildlife Research Center in Olympia, Washington. He was found dead in his jail cell on December 21, 2005. According to police, Rodgers committed suicide using a plastic bag.

== Biography ==
=== Before ELF ===
Rodgers first adopted deep ecology style thinking and engaged in Earth First! activism at Mt. Graham telescope project protests of the early 1990s in Arizona. He lived out of his Toyota 4×4 as he traveled North America's wild lands and became involved in many Earth First demonstrations of that time. Rogers was one of the few long-term activists to camp out in snow caves in central Idaho's deepest wilderness during the Cove/Mallard timber sale in the winter of 1994–1995.

His experiences and exposure in the backcountry must have further radicalized Rodgers beyond the civil disobedience activism of Earth First! (EF). EF style civil disobedience was at the time under consideration as possible terrorism by the US Congress in hearings of select subcommittees. Rodgers was a long-term EF activist, one of the occupation activists of the Cove / Mallard timber sale protests for years, and was one of four protesters who constantly camped out in snow-caves in the winter of January–March 1995 in 12 foot deep snow and sub-zero temps, monitoring the logging traffic on Noble Road. After witnessing the destruction of "America's Amazon Jungle", Rodgers became disenchanted with mere civil-disobedience tactics and grew more radical. He briefly secluded himself in Spring 1995 only to reappear at the Earth First 11 month-long occupation of the Warner Creek timber sale or "Free Cascadia" in Oregon. During these times, Rodgers always spoke of being a witness for the defenseless and was a peaceful presence.

While participating in the occupation of Warner Creek Oregon, Rodgers first met Jacob Ferguson aka "Donut", the man who years later turned FBI informant against this cell of Earth Liberation Front activists to avoid prison time for heroin possession. Ironically, Rodgers openly debated with other radical environmentalists against the effectiveness of targeted property destruction operations, during the mid-1990s.

=== ELF and later ===
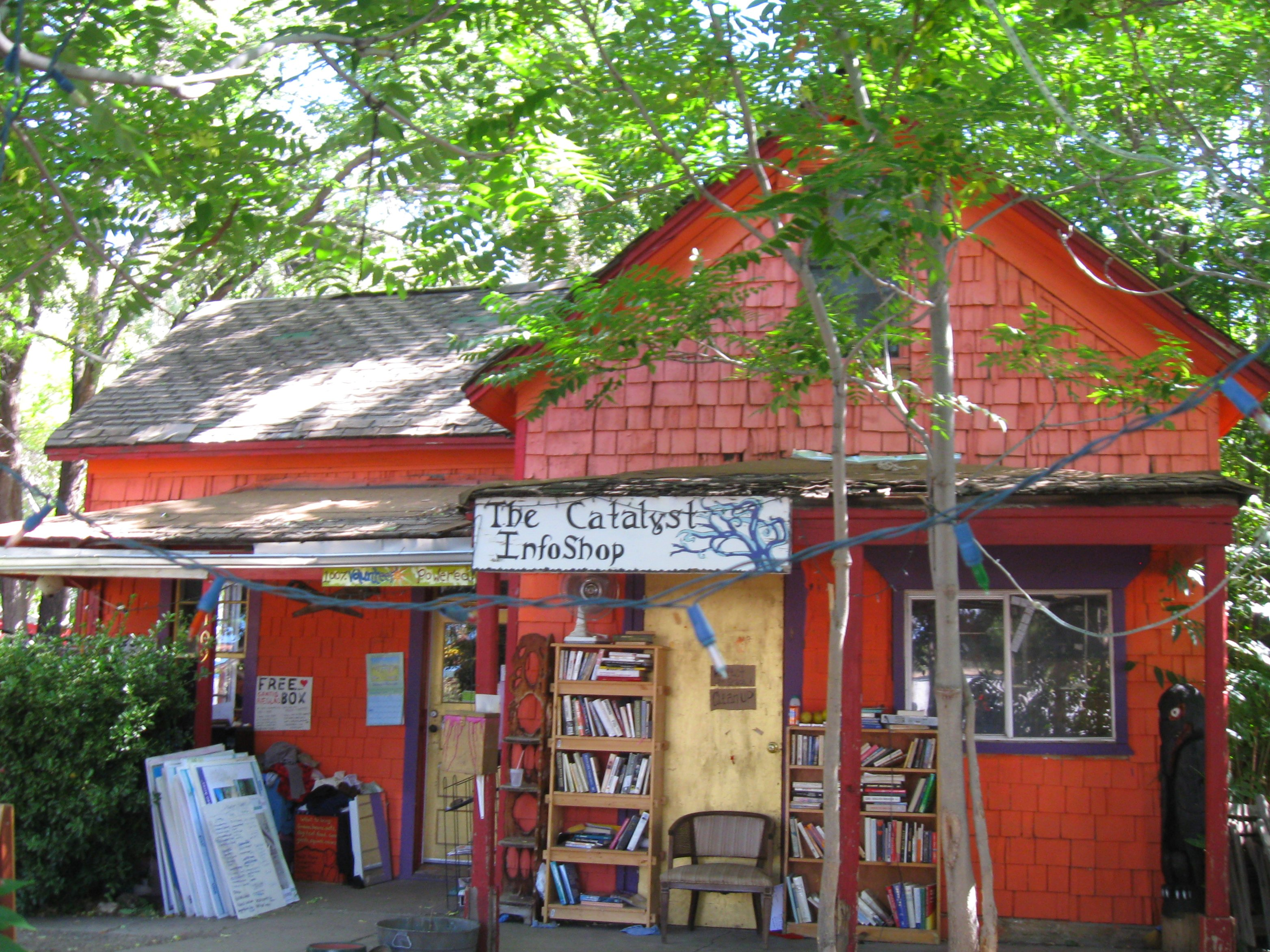
The Catalyst Infoshop

Between 1996 and 2001 the ELF cell Rodgers was involved in is alleged to have started fifteen fires across the West.

Rodgers wrote an article for the Earth First Journal about how drug abuse was sapping the will & strength of the environmental movement as activists got depressed and sought solace from the emotional pain by smoking marijuana or drinking heavily.

After an action involving burning SUVs in March 2001, the Police become suspicious of ELF cell member Ferguson. Rodgers, worried of getting caught and tired of infighting, moved to Prescott, Arizona.

In 2004, Rodgers co-founded the Catalyst Infoshop with Katie Rose Nelson.

=== Arrest and death ===
Rodgers was arrested in an FBI raid on December 7, 2005, at the Catalyst Infoshop. The FBI were working on information provided by Ferguson, an informer from the same ELF cell as Rodgers.

Rodgers wrote a suicide note which he mailed to a number of his friends:

To my friends and supporters to help them make sense of all these events that have happened so quickly: Certain human cultures have been waging war against the Earth for millennia. I chose to fight on the side of bears, mountain lions, skunks, bats, saguaros, cliff rose, and all things wild. I am just the most recent casualty in that war. But tonight I have made a jail break – I am returning home, to the Earth, to the place of my origins. Bill, 12/21/05 (the winter solstice.)

== Government claims ==
The FBI has claimed that Rodgers was a criminal "mastermind" and the anonymous author of Setting Fire with Electrical Timers, an Earth Liberation Front Guide, which explained in detail how to create an incendiary device known as a "cat's cradle". Authorities said that once the guide was published they no longer were able to tell with certainty when the ELF cell connected to Rodgers was responsible for an arson.

== Continuing influence ==
Rodgers has had a continuing impact on various anarchist and radical environmentalist movements. A number of acts have been dedicated to his memory. Among these have been the removal of 28 beagle puppies from the Faculty of Veterinary Medicine at the Independent University of Madrid and the burning of a partially constructed development in Guelph, Ontario, Canada.

== See also ==
- Rod Coronado
- Eco-terrorism
- Green anarchism
- Green Scare
