= Eco-terrorism =

Act of violence committed in support of environmental causes

Eco-terrorism is an act of violence which is committed in support of environmental causes, against people or property.

Eco-terrorism is a form of radical environmentalism that arose out of the same school of thought that brought about deep ecology, ecofeminism, social ecology, and bioregionalism.

Large-N datasets have found very few instances of fatalities as a result of eco-terrorism. In the United States, the radical environmental movement frequently engaged in arson, property destruction and sabotage (without fatalities) up until the mid-2000s when it increasingly shifted to civil disobedience and mass protests.

== History ==
The term eco-terrorism was not coined until the 1960s; however, the history of eco-terrorism precedes that time. Although not referred to as eco-terrorism at the time, there have been incidents in history of people using terror to protect or defend the environment. It can be seen in the War of Desmoiselles, or War of the Maidens. The War of the Demoiselles was a series of peasant revolts in response to the new forest codes implemented by the French government in 1827. In May 1829, groups of peasant men dressed in women's clothes terrorized forest guards and charcoal-makers whom they felt had wrongfully taken the land to exploit it. The revolts persisted for four years until May 1832.

This particular instance is considered an act of eco-terrorism because the peasants used tactics similar to modern-day eco-terrorist groups. The peasants of Ariege masked their identities and committed acts of terror. They specifically targeted government officials who infringed on the rights of the forest; however, this is considered a pre-history rather than an actual act of eco-terrorism because the peasants were not environmentalists. The peasants committed their acts to protect the environment because they felt they had a claim to it due to it being their main source of income and way of life for generations.

Instances of primitive eco-terrorism can also be found in the age of colonialism and imperialism. Native and indigenous people didn't have the same view on land as property that Europeans did. When the Europeans colonized other foreign lands they believed that the natives were not using the land properly. Land was something that was meant to be profited and capitalized off of. Oftentimes natives would engage in warfare to protect their land. This is similar to the way that modern-day environmentalists fight to protect land from major corporations aiming to deforest land to build factories. An example of Europeans infringing on the rights of natives can be found in the colonial administration of Algeria. When the French colonized Algeria they took the land from natives because they believed they were not using it properly, claiming that their nomadic lifestyle was damaging to the environment to justify their usurping of the land; however, the natives of Algeria engaged in battles to try and keep their land and lifestyle.

In the United States, the radical environmental movement frequently engaged in arson, property destruction and sabotage (without fatalities) up until the mid-2000s when it increasingly shifted to civil disobedience and mass protests.

Large-N datasets have found very few instances of fatalities as a result of eco-terrorism.

== Eco-terrorism, civil disobedience, and sabotage ==
Eco-terrorism is often defined as the use of violence to further environmental policy change. Groups matching this description are willing to inflict emotional and physical distress on their victims if they believe it will further their environmental goals. This more radical version of environmental action is illegal, as compared to its more moderate forerunner of eco-activism which is not illegal and would be classified as a form of civil disobedience and uses protests, sit-ins and other civil actions to effect environmental change. Eco-terrorism can also include sabotage in the name of the environment, which is illegal as this includes crimes against property which could lead to harm to humans. In the United States, the FBI's definition of terrorism includes acts of violence against property, which makes most acts of sabotage fall in the realm of domestic terrorism.

Many radical environmentalists contest the FBI's definition of eco-terrorism for being inaccurate compared to other definitions of terrorism such as that of the International Policy Institute for Counter-Terrorism which states that acts of terrorism are only those purposely directed at civilians. Radical environmentalists also criticize conflation of eco-terrorism with ecotage by governments and media as rhetorical tools to take advantage of preconceived notions about terrorism and apply them to acts which do not fit what terrorism really is.

Sabotage involves destroying, or threatening to destroy, property, and in this case is also known as monkeywrenching or ecotage. Many acts of sabotage involve the damage of equipment and unmanned facilities using arson.

== Philosophy ==
The thought behind eco-terrorism rises from the radical environmentalism movement, which gained currency during the 1960s. Ideas that arose from radical environmentalism are "based on the belief that capitalism, patriarchal society, and the industrial revolution and its subsequent innovations were responsible for the despoliation of nature". Radical environmentalism is also characterized by the belief that human society is responsible for the depletion of the environment and, if current society is left unchecked, will lead to the ultimate complete degradation of the environment. Craig Rosebraugh, spokesperson of the Animal Liberation Front and Earth Liberation Front, justifies destructive or violent direct action as necessary evils in response to the lack of action regarding environmentalist efforts. Rosebraugh cites a "choice-of-evils defense" and asks whether it is a "greater evil to destroy this property of this corporation or to choose to allow these corporations to continue to destroy the environment"

Many of the groups accused of eco-terrorism spawn from the radical environmentalist philosophy of deep ecology. Deep ecologists believe that human self-realization must come from identification with the greater environment. Deep ecology calls for complete solidarity with the environment and therefore categorizes many conservation groups as "shallow", encouraging more drastic approaches to environmental activism. Biocentrism is a central tenet of deep ecology which is described as "a belief that human beings are just an ordinary member of the biological community" and that all living things should have rights and deserve protection under the law. Other eco-terrorists are motivated by different aspects of deep ecology, like the goal to return the environment to its "natural", i.e., pre-industrial, state.

== Examples of tactics ==
There are a wide variety of tactics used by eco-terrorists and groups associated with eco-terrorism. Examples include:

- Tree spiking is a common tactic that was first used by members of Earth First! in 1984. Tree spiking involves hammering small spikes into the trunk of a tree that may be logged with the intention of damaging the chainsaw or mill blades. This may also seriously injure the logger, though only one case of serious injury has been widely reported.
- Arson is a tactic most associated with recent activity in the Earth Liberation Front (ELF). The ELF has been attributed with arsons of sites such as housing developments, SUV dealerships, and chain stores.
- Bombing, while rare, has been used by eco-terrorists. For example, the Superphénix construction site was attacked with anti-tank rockets (RPG-7). While carried out by environmental activists, the status of the 1976 Bunbury bombing in Australia as an act of terrorism has been debated.
- Monkeywrenching is a tactic popularized by Edward Abbey in his book The Monkey Wrench Gang that involves sabotaging equipment that is environmentally damaging.

== Notable individuals convicted of eco-terrorist crimes ==
- Tre Arrow
- Dave Foreman – arrested by the FBI for conspiracy to sabotage a powerline that fed a water pumping station
- James Lee
- Wiebo Ludwig – accused several times of sabotaging oil and gas wells in Alberta, Canada
- Ted Kaczynski
- Jeff Luers
- Marius Mason
- Daniel McGowan – convicted of participation in an arson at a lumber company
- John Togo - militant leader that engaged in multiple armed confrontations with oil corporations, including Shell, Chevron, and ExxonMobil

== Groups accused ==
Organizations accused of eco-terrorism are generally grassroots organizations, do not have a hierarchical structure, and typically favor direct action approaches to their goals.

Stefan Leader characterizes these groups, namely the ELF, as having "leaderless resistance" which he describes as "a technique by which terrorist groups can carry out violent acts while reducing the risk of infiltration by law enforcement elements. The basic principle of leaderless resistance is that there is no centralized authority or chain-of-command." Essentially this consists of independent cells which operate autonomously, sharing goals, but having no central leaders or formal organizational structure. Those who wish to join are typically encouraged to start their own cell, rather than seek out other members and jeopardize their secrecy.

=== Organizations in the United States ===
Organizations that have been accused of eco-terrorism in the United States include the Animal Liberation Front (ALF), the Earth Liberation Front (ELF), the Sea Shepherd Conservation Society, Earth First!, The Coalition to Save the Preserves, and the Hardesty Avengers. In 2010, the FBI was criticized in U.S. Justice Department reports for unjustified surveillance (and placement on the Terrorism Watchlist) of about 2000 members of animal rights and environmentalist groups such as Greenpeace and PETA.

In a 2002 testimony to the US Congress, an FBI official mentioned the actions of Sea Shepherd Conservation Society in the context of eco-terrorism. The Sea Shepherd Conservation Society intervenes against whaling, seal hunting, and fishing operations with direct action tactics. In 1986, the group caused nearly US$1.8 million in damage to equipment used by Icelandic whalers. In 1992, they sabotaged two Japanese ships that were drift-net fishing for squid by cutting their nets and throwing stink bombs on board the boats.

Inspired by Edward Abbey, Earth First! began in 1980. Although the group has been credited with becoming more mainstream, its use of tree spiking during campaigns has been associated with the origins of eco-terrorism. In 1990, Earth First! organizers Judi Bari and Darryl Cherney were injured when a motion-detecting pipe bomb detonated beneath Bari's driver's seat. Authorities alleged that the bomb was being transported and accidentally detonated. The pair sued investigators, alleging false arrest, illegal search, slanderous statements and conspiracy. In 2002, a jury found that FBI agents and Oakland police officers violated constitutional rights to free speech and protection from unlawful searches of Earth First! organizers.

The Earth Liberation Front, founded in 1992, joined with the Animal Liberation Front, which had its beginnings in England in 1979. They have been connected primarily with arson but claim that they work to harm neither human nor animal. A recent example of ELF arson was the March 2008 "torching of luxury homes in the swank Seattle suburb of Woodinville". A banner left at the scene claimed the housing development was not green as advertised, and was signed ELF. In September 2009 ELF claimed responsibility for the destruction of two radio towers in Seattle. The FBI in 2001 named the ELF as "one of the most active extremist elements in the United States", and a "terrorist threat." The Coalition to Save the Preserves was mentioned in FBI testimony as a group that was responsible for a series of arsons in Arizona. Using similar tactics to the ELF, they have caused more than US$5 million in damages.

Media reports have tied Ted Kaczynski, also known as the Unabomber, to environmental activists, and say that the 23 injuries and three deaths from letter bombs were the acts of an independent eco-terrorist. Among those making such accusations were ABC, The New York Times, Time magazine, and USA Today.

A number of "local" organizations have also been indicted under US Federal laws related to eco-terrorism. These include, among others, the group Stop Huntingdon Animal Cruelty. Another example is the Hardesty Avengers who spiked trees in the Hardesty Mountains in Willamette National Forest in 1984.

In 2008 the Federal Bureau of Investigation said eco-terrorists represented "one of the most serious domestic terrorism threats in the U.S. today" citing the sheer volume of their crimes (over 2,000 since 1979); the huge economic impact (losses of more than US$110 million since 1979); the wide range of victims (from international corporations to lumber companies to animal testing facilities to genetic research firms); and their increasingly violent rhetoric and tactics (one recent communiqué sent to a California product testing company said: "You might be able to protect your buildings, but can you protect the homes of every employee?").

Unclear, however, is the extent to which informants and controversial FBI entrapment operations play in creating eco-terrorist groups and furthering criminal acts. In 2015, so-called "green anarchist" Eric McDavid was freed from a 2007 conviction after it was disclosed the FBI operated a program to lure unsuspecting activists via "blatant entrapment." The 2007 conviction had been cited by the FBI in its 2008 claim that eco-terrorism was a significant threat.

The National Animal Interest Alliance in their animal rights extremism archives compiled a comprehensive list of major animal rights extremist and eco-criminal acts of terrorism since 1983.

== US governmental response ==
Spiking trees became a federal offense in the United States when it was added to the Drug Act in 1988.

Under the Animal Enterprise Protection Act of 1992 it became a federal crime to "cause more than $10,000 in damage while engaged in "physical disruption to the functioning of an animal enterprise by intentionally stealing, damaging, or causing the loss of any property […] used by the animal enterprise." In 2006, this was updated and renamed the Animal Enterprise Terrorism Act by the 109th congress. The updated act included causing personal harm and the losses incurred on "secondary targets" as well as adding to the penalties for these crimes.

In 2003, a conservative legislative lobbying group, the American Legislative Exchange Council (ALEC), proposed the "Animal and Ecological Terrorism Act" which defined an "animal rights or ecological terrorist organization" as "two or more persons organized for the purpose of supporting any politically motivated activity intended to obstruct or deter any person from participating in an activity involving animals or an activity involving natural resources." The legislation was not enacted.

The FBI has stated that "since 2005…investigations have resulted in indictments against 30 individuals." In 2006, an FBI case labeled "Operation Backfire" brought charges of domestic terrorism against eleven people associated with the ELF and ALF. "The indictment includes charges related to arson, conspiracy, use of destructive devices, and destruction of an energy facility." Operation Backfire was a result of the 1998 burning of a ski resort in Vail, Colorado by the group, "The Family." The incident resulted in $26 million in damages. The FBI joined together with the Bureau of Alcohol, Tobacco, Firearms and Explosives to convict the individuals and any future eco-terrorist groups.

However, the Bush Justice Department, including the FBI, was criticized in 2010 for improper investigations and prosecutions of left-leaning US protest groups such as Greenpeace. The Washington Post reported that the "FBI improperly opened and extended investigations of some U.S. activist groups and put members of an environmental advocacy organization on a terrorist watch list, even though they were planning nonviolent civil disobedience, the Justice Department said Monday."

A report, filed by Inspector General Glenn A. Fine, found the FBI to be not guilty of the most serious charge — according to the Post — that "agents targeted domestic groups based on their exercise of First Amendment rights." The investigation was conducted in response to allegations that the FBI had targeted groups on such grounds during the Bush Administration. The Post continued:

But the report cited what it called other "troubling" FBI practices in its monitoring of domestic groups in the years between the September 11, 2001, terrorist attacks and 2006. In some cases, Fine said, agents began investigations of people affiliated with activist groups for 'factually weak' reasons and 'without adequate basis' and improperly kept information about activist groups in its files. Among the groups monitored were the Thomas Merton Center, a Pittsburgh peace group; People for the Ethical Treatment of Animals; and Greenpeace USA. Activists affiliated with Greenpeace were improperly put on a terrorist watch list, the report said.

== See also ==
- Agro-terrorism
- Anarcho-primitivism
- Earth Liberation Prisoners Support Network
- Ecofascism
- Eco-terrorism in fiction
- Eco-warrior
- Environmental terrorism
- Green Scare
- THERMCON – FBI operation against the "Evan Mecham Eco-Terrorist International Conspiracy" (EMETIC)
