= Marius Mason =

American anarchist (born 1962)

Marius Mason (born January 26, 1962) is an American anarchist, environmental and animal rights activist, and transgender advocate who, in 2009, was sentenced to nearly 22 years in prison for 13 counts of arson and property damage. A member of the Earth Liberation Front, Mason was prosecuted for a 1999 attack on a building at Michigan State University, East Lansing, Michigan, that caused more than US$1 million in damage, undertaken as a protest against research into genetically modified crops. A further US$3 million in damage comprised attacks on houses under construction and on boats owned by a person responsible for a mink farm.

Supporters allege that Mason's sentence represents a form of political repression in which an overlong sentence is given for politically motivated crimes.Mason's actions were deemed eco-terrorism by prosecutors,, and his case is regarded by environmental activists as part of the Green Scare. Supporters considered him a political prisoner.

In 2014, Mason came out as a transgender man. He began hormone replacement therapy in 2016 and by 2022 was slated to undergo sex reassignment surgery; however, this was prevented in January 2025 by Executive Order 14168 which denies the rights of social, legal, and medical transition to U.S. federal prisoners.

On May 14, 2026, after 17 years of imprisonment, Mason was released from federal prison to a halfway house.

== Background ==
Mason has worked as a gardener, musician, writer, Earth First! organizer, and a volunteer for a free herbal-healthcare collective. He is a father of two children. Mason, together with his then-husband Frank Ambrose, ignited an office that held records related to research on genetically modified, moth-resistant potatoes, funded by the United States Agency for International Development and biotech company Monsanto. The next day, Mason and Ambrose set fire to commercial logging equipment in Mesick, Michigan. Both arson attacks were claimed by the Earth Liberation Front as actions against genetic engineering, deforestation, and other environmentally destructive acts. On December 31, 1999, members of the Land Liberation Front claimed an arson attack on the Michigan State University farm building located in East Lansing, Michigan. US ELF claimed it set the fire specifically to stop the work of those studying genetically modified foods.

In 2007, after evidence linking him to the attacks was found, Ambrose began co-operating with police. Over the following year, he recorded 178 conversations with Mason and other activists. Mason and three others were indicted in March 2008. Ambrose divorced Mason on the day the latter was arrested. In February 2009, Mason was sentenced to 22 years in prison for arson, then the record sentence for an American eco-terrorist act. In return for his co-operation with prosecutors, Ambrose was sentenced to less than six years for conspiracy to commit arson.

== Trial ==
According to Assistant U.S. Attorney Hagen Frank, the 20-year sentence sought by the prosecution would be "the most onerous sentence imposed in a case of this sort".

At the trial, the prosecution argued that "A good cause does not justify the worst means. That's not how society works."

During the three-hour hearing, Mason said, "I am genuinely sorry to those who were personally frightened by my actions ... I meant to inspire thought and compassion, not fear." After the sentence, defense lawyer John Minock stated that he would appeal, commenting, "I'm shocked. It's grossly out of proportion to other cases."

== Personal life ==
Believed to be the first man to begin sex transition in federal prison, Marius came out as transgender in 2014, but was prevented from receiving medically necessary testosterone as part of transgender hormone therapy until 2016.

In 2021, Mason was transferred to the male section at FCI Danbury, and in 2022, he was approved by the Bureau of Prisons for sex reassignment surgery. However, as a result of an anti-trans executive order issued on the first day of the second Trump administration, Mason's surgery was canceled and he was returned to the women's section at Danbury.

Mason is vegan.

== See also ==
- Green Anarchism
- Genetically modified food
- Rod Coronado
- Jeff Luers
- Eric McDavid
