= Earth Liberation Front =

Anarchist environmental activism group

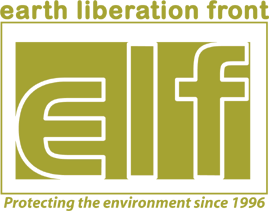
- Proposed ELF logo
- Founded: 1992; 34 years ago
- Purpose: Environmentalism and Ecotage
- Location(s): Active in North America, Europe, and other regions
- Origins: United Kingdom
- Method: Direct action and sabotage

The Earth Liberation Front (ELF), also known as "Elves" or "The Elves", is the collective name for autonomous individuals or covert cells who, according to the ELF Press Office, use "economic sabotage and guerrilla warfare to stop the exploitation and destruction of the environment".

The ELF was founded in Brighton in the United Kingdom in 1992, and spread to the rest of Europe by 1994. The ELF acronym derived from the original ELF guerrilla group, the Environmental Life Force, that was founded in 1977 in Santa Cruz, California by activist John Clark Hanna. The Earth Liberation Front is now an international organization with actions reported in 17 countries and is widely regarded as descending from Animal Liberation Front because of the relationship and cooperation between the two movements. Using the same leaderless resistance model, as well as similar guidelines to, the ALF, sympathizers say that it is an eco-defense group dedicated to taking the profit motive out of environmental destruction by causing economic damage to businesses through the use of property damage.

The name came to public prominence when they were featured on the television show 60 Minutes in 2005. The group was further highlighted in the 2011 Academy Award–nominated documentary If a Tree Falls: A Story of the Earth Liberation Front.

== Structure and aims ==
ELF "monkeywrenching" is carried out against facilities and companies involved in logging, genetic engineering, GMO crops, deforestation, sport utility vehicle (SUV) sales, urban sprawl, rural cluster and developments with larger homes, energy production and distribution, and a wide variety of other activities, all charged by the ELF with exploiting the Earth, its environment and inhabitants.

The Earth Liberation Front has no formal leadership, hierarchy, membership or official spokesperson and is entirely decentralized; instead consisting of individuals or cells who choose the term as a banner to use. Individuals are commonly known to work in affinity groups, known as cells, and are usually self-funded.

Techniques involve destruction of property, by either using tools to disable or through arson to destroy what activists believe is being used to injure animals, people or the environment. These actions are sometimes called ecotage and there are marked differences between their actions in the United States and the United Kingdom.

With many different reasons why ELF activists carry out economic sabotage, a communique to the press claiming the responsibility for arson against urban sprawl in December 2000, described the reason a cell took an action. The ELF claimed that burning down the house was non-violent because it was searched for any living creatures first; an issue which is much debated within the environmental movement.

Some of the most common and notable attacks are against the development of multimillion-dollar houses, a frequent target in the ELF campaign. In a communique to the press from the group's "above-ground spokesperson", Craig Rosebraugh, that was later published in The Environmental Magazine, the group said in November 2000:

Urban sprawl has undoubtedly served to alter nearly 90 percent of Long Island's habitats, either by physically removing them, paving them, or polluting them with toxic man-made materials, making them either undesirable or unsustainable for most species.

=== Press office ===
The North American Earth Liberation Front Press Office (NAELFPO or ELFPO) was relaunched in October 2008, receiving anonymous communiques from activists, for distributing to the press and public, to discuss the motives, ideologies and history behind such actions.

Craig Rosebraugh served as an unofficial spokesperson for the ELF Press Office in North America from 1997 to early September 2001. Doubts have been raised about whether Rosebraugh or other unofficial spokespeople have ties to the cells involved, although the press office claim they do not know the identities of ELF members.

=== Support networks ===
Prisoner support networks support ELF prisoners, such as Spirit of Freedom (ELPSN), an English website listing all Earth Liberation prisoners, as well as a variety of other prisoners of conscience. There are also ELF support networks in Belgium, Italy, North America, and Poland, which collectively coordinate the support of prisoners, as well as websites for specific prisoners, such as for; Rod Coronado, Jeff "Free" Luers, Daniel McGowan, Briana Waters, Marius Mason and Tre Arrow. The networks distribute literature written by those in prison to their supporters and sometimes raise funds for those who require financial aid in their legal cases.

=== Philosophy ===
Earth liberationists, are a diverse group of individuals with a variety of different political ideologies and theories. These include; animal liberationists, anti-capitalists, green anarchists, deep ecologists, eco-feminists, and anti-globalisationists.

Elves argue that direct action is required to aid the earth liberation movement, also referred to as eco-resistance movement, and a part of the radical environmental movement. The ELF claim that it would be similar to how the ALF has projected forward the animal liberation movement. There was also the intention that, in the same way animal liberationists "help out" with legal campaigns, earth liberationists would aid above-ground environmental organizations, notably Earth First!, by acts of ecotage.

== Origin ==
=== United Kingdom ===
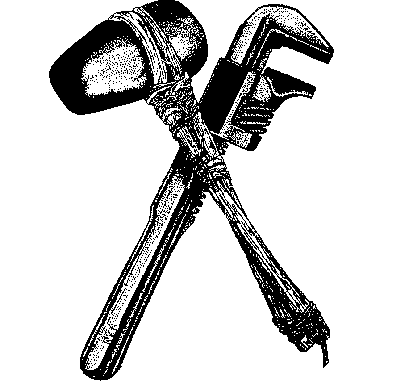
The symbol of Earth First!: a monkey wrench and stone hammer.

The Earth Liberation Front was founded in 1992 in Brighton, England by members of the Earth First! (EF!) environmental movement at the first-ever national meeting. At the time, EF! had become very popular, so people's concerns were based on maintaining this popularity and by doing so not associating with overt law-breaking. There was no universal agreement over this, but it was accepted amongst the movement that British EF! would instead continue to advocate and focus on civil disobedience and mass demonstrations. If people wanted to participate in acts of ecotage, the new name "Earth Liberation Front" would be used, with its name and guidelines derived from the Animal Liberation Front (ALF), another movement that uses direct action to liberate animals or sabotage companies using them. It was understood that the simplicity of the guidelines was a crucial factor to engage as many people as possible to the new cause, with the intention that the ELF would quickly become as popular as the ALF.

==== Earth Night ====
The very first ELF action is unknown, or undocumented, but one of the first and most notable actions was on April Fool's Earth Night 1992, a night organized by activists to carry out ecotage and also one of the first of them. The Elves, as they were also known, targeted Fisons, a peat company accused of destroying the peat bogs causing £50,000–70,000 worth of damage. Pumps, trucks and other machinery belonging to the company were destroyed after legal campaigners, Friends of the Earth, spent two years advocating a boycott of the company. Green Anarchist magazine publicized the communique with the demands from the ELF:

All our peat bogs must be preserved in their entirety, for the sake of the plants, the animals and our national heritage. Cynically donating small amounts will do no good. The water table will drop, and the bogs will dry out and die unless it is preserved fully. Fisons must leave all of it alone – now!

== Development of the ELF abroad ==
=== Europe ===
The ELF quickly spread across to Europe by 1994, with actions first occurring in the Netherlands, Germany, Russia, Scandinavia, Italy, Ireland, Poland, Spain, France and Finland, and the name starting to be used across the globe. The Earth Liberation Front is widely regarded as the Animal Liberation Front's younger sibling, because of the relationship and cooperation between the two movements. It is believed that cells rapidly established themselves in new countries because of the global outreach of Earth First! and the connection between the two groups. British Elves were also making contact with like-minded activists, informing them about the ELF and its tactics, with missionaries targeting specifically France, Spain, Germany, and the Netherlands.

Within two years, McDonald's had been vandalized in Germany and Poland, Amsterdam Airport Schiphol had been sabotaged, and high-emission vehicles had been destroyed. Hunting towers were torn down in the Netherlands and Germany, which was presumably inspired by similar actions against hunting by the ALF.

==== Canadian ELA ====
The first time it was known that an earth liberation action had happened in North America, was in 1995, in Canada, by a group calling itself the Earth Liberation Army (ELA). They were considered by the European Elves at the time to be "transatlantic cousins". On 19 June 1995, the ELA burned down a wildlife museum and damaged a hunting lodge in British Columbia.

==== United States ====
On Columbus Day 1996, activists spraypainted "504 years of genocide" and "ELF" on the walls of a public relations office, as well as a McDonald's restaurant in Oregon, the actions were the very first by the ELF in the United States. The same restaurant then had its locks glued and spraypainted again, but this time in support of the British McLibel Two, two activists who had distributed anti-McDonald's leaflets. The next day, it was reported that another two McDonald's restaurants, again in Oregon, had their locks glued by ELF activists. The only other reported action of the year was on Christmas Day, when a fur farm was raided in Michigan and 150 mink released into the wild by the Great Lakes ELF.

The Fox, a Chicago-area Fox River environmental activist, began ELF-style operations in the early 1970s and continued into the 1980s, while the peak number of ELF actions occurred in the early 1990s.

ELF activities declined in the United States after 2003, and by 2012 there were next to none.

==== Mexico ====
In late November 2008, a group calling itself Eco-Anarquista Por El Ataque Directo (Eco-anarchist cell supporting direct attack) claimed responsibility for several recent actions, including half a dozen Molotov cocktails thrown at tren férreo (metro rail) in Mexico City, incendiary sabotage against Telmex, and a Molotov cocktail thrown at a Banamex ATM. The group claimed that these attacks were a form of protest against the construction of a new rail line (line 12), in Mexico City (D.F.) and Mexico State. The construction had caused deforestation and the eviction of many families.

Soon after this initial group of actions, the Frente de Liberación de la Tierra (Earth Liberation Front) claimed responsibility for a number of actions including the sabotage of a construction machine on December 30, 2008, arson at the Universidad Nacional Autónoma de México (UNAM) and the March 22nd, 2009 burning of construction equipment in Guadalajara, Jalisco.

=== South America ===
==== Argentina ====
Over the first months of 2012, several car arson cases in Buenos Aires were claimed by the "Frente de Liberacion de la Tierra", stating that "... we propose to destroy property from the bourgeoise class from Palermo to Villa Devoto who are sure that everything will stay the same, but some individuals are tired of this and pretend to continue with this initiative to expand the daily riots..."

== Notable attacks: 1998–2009 ==
=== 1996–1999 ===
The ELF gained state attention in the state of Oregon in 1996 when they burned down the Oakridge Ranger Station. The ELF gained national attention for a series of actions which earned them the label of eco-terrorists. In 1998, the ELF set fire to a ski resort in Vail, Colorado, on October 19, costing $12 million. In a communique to the press, the ELF said:

Vail, Inc. is already the largest ski operation in North America and now wants to expand even further. The 12 miles (19 km) of roads and 885 acres (3.58 km^{2}) of clearcuts will ruin the last, best lynx habitat in the state. Putting profits ahead of Colorado's wildlife will not be tolerated.

Actions also included sabotaging power lines, the burning of an SUV dealership, and the burning down of a logging headquarters causing $1 million in damages. The Elves wrote to the local paper "Let this be a lesson to all greedy multinational corporations who don't respect their ecosystems," with most actions taking place in Oregon. The defendants in the case were later charged in the FBI's "Operation Backfire", which included 17 acts of property destruction.

The ELF then set fire to Michigan State University on New Year's Eve, using a gasoline bomb to cause $1.1 million in damages, because of a program to provide GMO plants to African farmers. ELF spokesmen claimed Monsanto had been a major contributor to funding the program; however, the only funding from Monsanto Corp. was a one-time sum of $2,000 to send five African students to a conference on biotechnology. The next day, commercial logging equipment was set on fire, with "ELF" and "Go Log in Hell" spraypainted on a truck. In March 2008, four activists were charged for both the arsons.

=== 2000 ===
On November 27, in Colorado, the ELF burned the Legend Ridge mansion and sent a message to the Boulder Weekly saying "Viva la revolution!" Damages were estimated at $2.5 million.

=== 2001 ===
In March, a total of thirty SUVs were torched, belonging to Joe Romania's dealership, in Oregon, with damages estimated at $1 million. The action was claimed in support of Jeff "Free" Luers, who targeted the very same dealership and was in court for the charges at the time. He was then sentenced to twenty-two years in jail, later revised to ten.

On May 21, a fire destroyed laboratories, offices, and archives at the Center for Urban Horticulture, University of Washington, causing a total of $7 million in damages. The arson destroyed 20 years of research and plant and book collections. The ELF claimed responsibility based upon the incorrect belief that the university was involved in genetic engineering of poplar trees. No genetic engineering was being conducted. In the wake of the attack, an FBI spokeswoman in Portland, Oregon said "I don't think there's any doubt the ELF is upping the ante".

On November 7, ELF member Ian Wallace planted incendiary devices outside of two buildings on the campus of Michigan Technological University in Houghton, Michigan during the early morning hours. The devices failed, and on March 21, 2009, Wallace was sentenced to three years in prison for the incident by Judge Robert Holmes Bell, who said Wallace "didn't intend to hurt anybody, (but) this is a serious offense." Said Wallace after his conviction, "I have been consumed by shame for what I have done," and "My greatest blessing is that no one got hurt."

=== 2003 ===
On January 1, in Girard, Pennsylvania, jugs of gasoline were set under three vehicles at Bob Ferrando Ford Lincoln Mercury and set ablaze. Two pickup trucks, one Sports Utility Vehicle (SUV) and a car were destroyed causing $90,000 in damages. Steve Dartnell of Fairview claimed responsibility for the attack.

On August 1, a 206-unit condominium in San Diego was destroyed, with a banner left at the scene saying "If you build it, we will burn it", signed "The E.L.F.s are mad". The damages totaled $20 million after flames reached an estimated 200 feet (61 m) in the air, as over a hundred firefighters attempted to put out the fire. The destruction was the movement's most financially damaging action against a target, with a local preservation group calling the action pointless, noting that "You can go and burn something down, but it's just going to get built again." Exactly three weeks later, 125 SUVs and Hummers were torched in Los Angeles costing a total of $3.5 million, with "I love pollution" spray-painted at the scene, and a month later, homes being built in San Diego were targeted again, this time costing an estimated $450,000 in damages.

=== 2006 ===
The FBI's most recent report stated that there had been over 1,200 "criminal incidents", within January 2006. A nearly completed 9,600-square-foot (890 m^{2}) house, worth $3 million, was burnt to the ground in Washington. It was reported that a bed-sheet was draped across the front gate, with a message reading "Built Green? Nope black. McMansions and RCDs r not green," a reference to rural cluster developments.

=== 2008 ===
On the morning of March 3, explosive devices set fire to four multimillion-dollar homes from the 2007 Seattle Street of Dreams in Echo Lake, Washington, causing $7 million in damage. Authorities described the act as "domestic terrorism" after finding "ELF" spray-painted in red letters, mocking claims that the homes were environmentally friendly: "Built Green? Nope black! McMansions in RCDs r not green. ELF."

=== 2009 ===
On March 23, the ELF claimed the burning of an excavator in Guadalajara, Jalisco, Mexico. In one of many anonymous communiques, the ELF reported to Bite Back; "Maybe we have not collapsed the system of domination with these actions, but it begins with actions like these."

On September 4, ELF claimed responsibility for using a stolen excavator to overturn two AM radio towers belonging to the station KRKO near Seattle, Washington; they claimed that radio waves are dangerous.

A Texas man was arrested after construction workers found a disabled construction vehicle graffitied with the words "ANOTHER TRACTOR DECOMMISSIONED BY THE E.L.F."

== Police response and convictions ==
=== First ELF arrest ===
In 1994, Dutch authorities and police made claims that British ELF activists were traveling abroad to cause sabotage, which was disputed by ELF. Later that year the first Earth Liberation Prisoner (ELP) was caught and later charged. Known as Paul S., he was arrested and accused of carrying out an 18-month campaign of vandalism in the Netherlands against road construction sites. The Dutch government attempted to declare him insane, because of his inability to provide a political reason for his actions, other than his care for the environment. This was unsuccessful and the prisoner was sentenced to three years for damaging property.

=== British police raids ===
Due to the increased popularity of the environmental movement, as well as the animal liberation movement and estimates that five ALF actions occurred per day, police carried out a series of raids against animal rights and environmental activists. In total, there were 55 homes raided against suspected ALF and ELF activists, including an individual in Italy. The police had not managed to charge anyone with any illegal activities, until on January 16, 1996, when six men were charged for a five-year ALF/ELF campaign. They were sentenced a year later each to three years for conspiracy to incite violence in the name of animal and earth liberation.

=== Operation Backfire ===
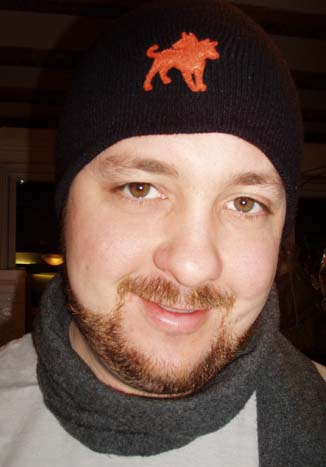
Daniel G. McGowan was charged for two counts of arson and conspiracy in the FBI's "Operation Backfire". He pleaded guilty to avoid a life sentence, without testifying against his co-defendants, some of whom had done so against him.

The term Green Scare, alluding to the Red Scares, periods of fear over communist infiltration of U.S. society, is a term popularized by environmental activists to refer to legal action by the U.S. government against the radical environmentalist movement.

It is first known to have appeared in 2002 in the wake of the February 12 congressional hearings titled "The Threat of Eco-Terrorism" which discussed groups including the Earth Liberation Front (ELF) and the Animal Liberation Front (ALF). In late 2005 and early 2006, as part of Operation Backfire, US grand juries indicted a total of 18 activists on a range of charges related to "violent acts in the name of animal rights and environmental causes". According to the FBI, many of these acts were carried out on behalf of the ELF and was considered as one of the largest arrests of environmental activists in American history.

The operation resulted in the arrest of Chelsea Dawn Gerlach, William C. Rodgers, and Daniel McGowan.

In 2008, the FBI increased the reward for handing over four suspects to $50,000. The four, two Americans and two Canadians, are believed to have fled the U.S. through Mexico and are possibly hiding in Syria, Russia, China or India. The announcement of an increased manhunt came on the tenth anniversary of the bombing in Vail.

A 2011 NPR report claimed some of the people associated with this group were imprisoned in a highly restrictive Communication management unit.

== Cooperation with the ALF ==
=== Philosophy ===
The name "Animal & Earth Liberation Front" or "Earth & Animal Liberation Front" (ALF and ELF, respectively) is commonly used when undertaking an animal liberation action, that is inclusively an environmental issue. Or alternatively an ELF action that includes in some way liberating or rescuing animals; for example actions to protect the forests. Both names are also used by radical activists when engaging in direct action to liberate animals and defend the earth by using property destruction. This is done within the guidelines of the Animal/Earth Liberation Front; to claim the action by both groups.

- Radical environmentalists consider the ELF to be the environmental wing of the Animal Liberation Front, effectively acting as the Eco-ALF. Evidence of this include names used such as the "Westcountry Wildlife Cell" and then later "ALF: Eco-Animal Defense Unit".
- The ELF is also considered to be the ALF's younger sister, forming 16 years later and due to the fact that the guidelines, as well as the name itself, were derived from the movement.
- Despite the movements only forming alliances in 1996/1997, activists such as Rod Coronado were known to be active in both the ALF and ELF dating back before the names were officially used together.

Noel Molland, a former ELF activist, writes in Steven Best's Igniting a Revolution that:

The founders of the ELF wanted radical environmentalists to work on the same basis and have a similar name, hoping that people would instantly understand how the ELF operated and what its goals were.

=== History ===
During the mid-1990s, the Western Wildlife Unit, an ELF branch in Britain, was responsible for various acts of animal rights themed violence. The vandalism included spiking trees as well as targeting anglers. However, it wasn't until sometime later, in the United States, that a joint claim of responsibility was made.

Molland also writes that the first ALF and ELF co-action was established on March 14, 1997, when the " Animal Liberation Front – Eco-Animal Defense Unit" claimed the spiking of 47 trees in a clearcut area, Oregon. This was only a few months after the fur farm had been raided by the Great Lakes ELF, which also highlighted the overlap in direct action for animal rights and environmentalism. The group intended to state that the farm they had raided was a joint effort between members of the Animal and Earth Liberation Front.

Five days later, the "Bay Area Cell of the Earth and Animal Liberation Front" claimed the firebombing of the University of California, an animal research laboratory that was still under construction at the time. Also later that year, on November 29, there was another joint ALF & ELF claim, this time releasing 500 feral horses and torching the Bureau of Land Management in Burns, OR in protest of BLM's intention to round up the wild horses and process them for the sale of horsemeat.

However, this claim contradicts the Southern Poverty Law Center, which states that the first incident of cooperation between the two movements was 6 months before these events on October 27, 1996, when the ALF & ELF were both responsible for firebombing a Forest Service truck in Detroit, Oregon. Then three days later both groups claimed the arson at the U.S. Forest Service Oakridge Ranger Station, at the cost of $5.3 million.

It was then reported that a week before the Bay Area cells fur farm raid, on March 11, 1997, four trucks were torched, at the Agricultural Fur Breeders Co-Op. The damage totaled $1 million and the action was again claimed by the ALF & ELF.

As the ELF was becoming well established through its actions, on 21 June 1998, the United States Forest Service wildlife research center near Olympia, Washington was set on fire with "Eco-Defense" and "Earth Liberation" spray-painted on construction machinery, which had received extensive damage in New Jersey on the 2nd Feb. Both the actions were claimed jointly by the ALF & ELF and were estimated to have caused one of the worst damages yet, estimated at $1.9 million. The same claim was made when 310 animals were taken from a fur farm involved in experimental research based in Madison, Wisconsin, which were stolen on the 3rd of July.

=== Actions ===
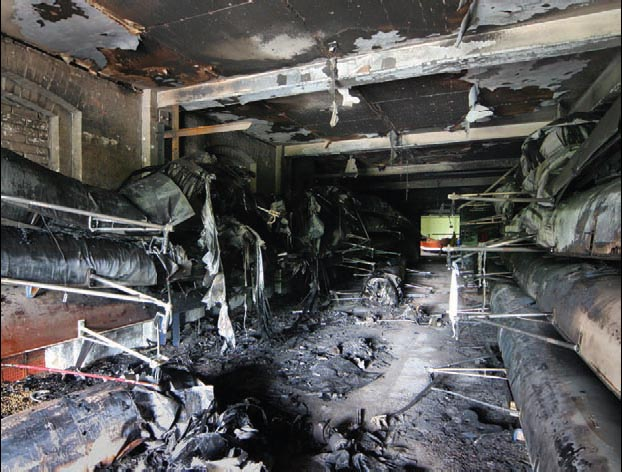
A fire by an ALF cell; the Oxford Arson Squad, causing £500,000 in damages to Londbridges boathouse, Oxfordshire on 4 July 2005.

Actions claimed by both the ALF and ELF jointly have appeared across the globe, nearly as much as the ELF has, causing more activists from the ALF and other movements to become involved; believing in "No Compromise in Defence of Mother Earth", a popular Earth First! slogan used and populated in the 1980s.

Despite this, in comparison to the ALF, there have been few communiques in recent years that have been released to the media or ELF Press Offices. This is largely due to the style of the ELF, who are much less likely to report their actions, or even leave a message to notify their targets regarding why they have been attacked.

Although ALF and ELF combined actions have continued, one of the latest strings of jointly claimed arsons was publicised in November 2002, when activists sent a communique to Bite Back and also the ELF Press Office, claiming responsibility for the arson at Mindek Brothers Fur Farm. In a press release, the groups stated the reason for their action:

Working together, cells from A.L.F. & E.L.F. demolished this feed facility due to its role in the systematic torture and killing of thousands of innocent creatures yearly – animals which possess the same complex emotional/physiological traits as loved household pets, yet are denied all reasonable consideration and confined to a miserable "existence" in tiny wire cages hardly large enough to turn around in.

== Legacy ==
Marshall Curry created a 2011 documentary about the ELF, If a Tree Falls: A Story of the Earth Liberation Front.

In 2022, The ELF was the subject of the 2022 BBC podcast series Burn Wild.

== Criticism ==
The FBI designated the ELF as "eco-terrorists". Representative Scott McInnis, then chairman of the US House Subcommittee on Forests and Forest Health, subpoenaed Craig Rosebraugh in an effort to investigate the ELF's activities. On hearing Rosebraugh's testimony, McInnis suggested it was "luck" no one has been killed by an ELF (or ALF) attack.

Despite the leaderless nature of the movement, the FBI says that activist Rod Coronado is "a national leader" of the ELF in the US, while Coronado describes himself as an "unofficial ELF spokesman".

== See also ==
- Ecopedagogy
- Earth Liberation Army
- Green anarchism
- Green syndicalism
- List of animal rights groups
- Resistance: Journal of the Earth Liberation Movement
- Rewilding
- University of Washington firebombing incident
- Informal Anarchist Federation
