= Daniel G. McGowan =

American environmental activist (born 1974)

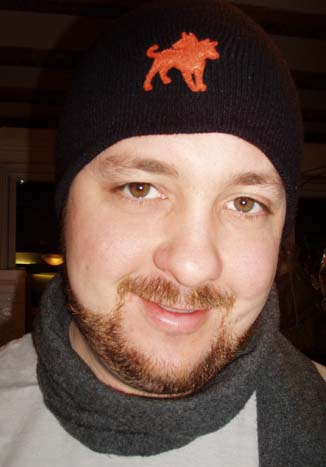
- Born: Daniel Gerard McGowan; 1974 (age 51–52); Brooklyn, New York, U.S.
- Occupations: Environmental and social justice activist
- Spouse: Jennifer Synan (divorced 2015)
- Status: Released June 5, 2013
- Conviction: Pled guilty
- Criminal charges: Arson and conspiracy to commit arson
- Penalty: 7 years in prison, $1.9 million restitution

Daniel Gerard McGowan (born 1974) is an American environmental activist, formerly associated with the Earth Liberation Front. The U.S. government considers him a domestic terrorist, having been arrested and charged in federal court on multiple counts of arson and conspiracy, relating to the arson of Superior Lumber company in Glendale, Oregon, on January 2, 2001, and Jefferson Poplar Farms in Clatskanie, Oregon, on May 21, 2001. His arrest is part of what the FBI dubbed Operation Backfire.

McGowan was facing a minimum of life in prison if convicted when he accepted a non-cooperation plea agreement, pleading guilty on November 9, 2006. A "terrorism" label was applied to his sentence, and McGowan was ultimately sentenced to 7 years' imprisonment. He was released on probation in June 2013.

== Biography ==
McGowan was born in Brooklyn and grew up in Queens, New York City, and graduated from Christ the King Regional High School in Middle Village. He has worked on many activist issues including military counter-recruitment, demonstrations against the Republican National Convention, the Really Really Free Market, and the support of prisoners such as Jeff Luers and others. McGowan was a graduate student earning a master's degree in acupuncture, and was an employee of WomensLaw.org, a nonprofit group that helps women in domestic abuse situations navigate the legal system.

== Arrest and Operation Backfire ==
On December 7, 2005, one of the largest arrests of environmental activists in American history began. Using the code name Operation Backfire, the FBI arrested six people. Chelsea Gerlach, William Rodgers, Kendall Tankersley, Kevin Tubbs, McGowan, and Stanislas Meyerhoff were arrested for allegedly taking part in crimes including arson and conspiracy as part of a domestic terrorism campaign. Meyerhoff agreed to be a federal cooperating witness almost immediately. On December 22, Rodgers was found dead in his cell in Flagstaff, Arizona, from an apparent suicide.

On January 20, federal prosecutors, the head of the FBI, and US Attorney General Alberto Gonzales held a press conference announcing a 65-count indictment against 11 individuals relating to 17 different incidents in Oregon, Washington, and California. In addition to the six arrested on December 7, the Oregon indictment also named Jonathan Paul, Suzanne Savoie, Joseph Dibee, Rebecca Rubin, and Josephine Overaker.

The Oregon indictment charged certain defendants with arson, attempted arson, and using and carrying a destructive device. The destructive device charge carried a 30-year mandatory sentence and a life sentence for a second conviction.

On June 28, the government arraigned Nathan Block, Joyanna Zacher, McGowan and Jonathan Paul on a 65-count superseding indictment. All four pleaded not guilty.

== Criticism of prosecution ==
The Christian Science Monitor reports that the "Operation Backfire" indictments have elicited concern from activists that authorities have "cracked the super-secrecy of ALF and ELF". Alternative media organizations have condemned the arrests, some calling them a "witch-hunt", "aimed at disrupting and discrediting political movements". Activists, alluding to the Red Scare, claim the operations are "fishing expedition[s]" carried out "in the midst of 9/11 McCarthyism". The government disputes these claims: FBI Director Robert Mueller stated the agency takes action "only when volatile talk crosses the line into violence and criminal activity".

== Plea agreement ==
On November 9, 2006, McGowan and co-defendants Jonathan Paul, Joyanna Zacher and Nathan Block pleaded guilty and signed a plea agreement. The agreement does not require the defendants' cooperation (i.e., informing on others).

Zacher and Block each pleaded to one count of conspiracy, attempted arson, and two separate incidents of arson. McGowan pleaded to conspiracy and to two separate incidents of arson. The government recommended that they be sentenced to 8 years in prison. Paul pleaded to one count of arson and one count of conspiracy. The government recommended Paul be sentenced to 5 years in prison. All four defendants were free to argue for a lesser sentence.

Prosecutors asked the court to apply a "terrorism enhancement" at sentencing. The defendants could have faced up to 20 years in prison in addition to the terms of the plea agreement. The government was seeking the enhancement because, despite the fact that the crimes involved only the destruction of private property, it was possible their actions could have led to people's injuries or deaths. No government property was damaged in any of the incidents.

== Sentencing and prison ==
On June 4, 2007, McGowan was sentenced to seven years in federal prison and ordered to pay $1.9 million in restitution. U.S. District Court Judge Ann Aiken presided over the sentencing, which took place at Oregon Federal Court in Eugene, Oregon. Judge Aiken applied a "terrorism enhancement" to the sentence. McGowan was incarcerated in the highly restrictive Communication Management Unit (CMU) at the United States Penitentiary, Marion, Illinois, from August 2008 to October 2010.

On October 19, 2010, McGowan's request for a transfer from the CMU to general population was granted. However – for reasons never explained to McGowan, his family, supporters, or lawyers – four months later he was transferred to another Communications Management Unit, this time in Terre Haute, Indiana.

Close to a year prior to the latest transfer, in March 2010, the Center for Constitutional Rights filed a lawsuit on behalf of multiple prisoners, including McGowan and his wife. In the time following the filing of this case, several news pieces that expose the CMUs have been published.

On December 11, 2012, McGowan was released to a halfway house in New York City. He was taken into custody again on April 4, 2013, several days after writing an article for the Huffington Post criticizing CMUs. The stated reason for McGowan's detention was that the Huffington Post article violated a regulation against inmates "publishing under a byline"; the Center for Constitutional Rights pointed out that this regulation had been declared unconstitutional, and McGowan was released back to a halfway house on April 5. On June 5, 2013, McGowan was released on probation.

== Documentary ==
In 2011, Sam Cullman and Marshall Curry's documentary If a Tree Falls: A Story of the Earth Liberation Front was released in theaters and on DVD by Oscilloscope Laboratories. The documentary follows McGowan's history with the ELF while examining the group at large. The film was shown on the PBS documentary series POV and on-line in September–October 2011.

== See also ==
- Environmental movement
- Earth First!
- Animal Liberation Front
- Jeff Luers
