= Craig Rosebraugh =

American writer, filmmaker and activist

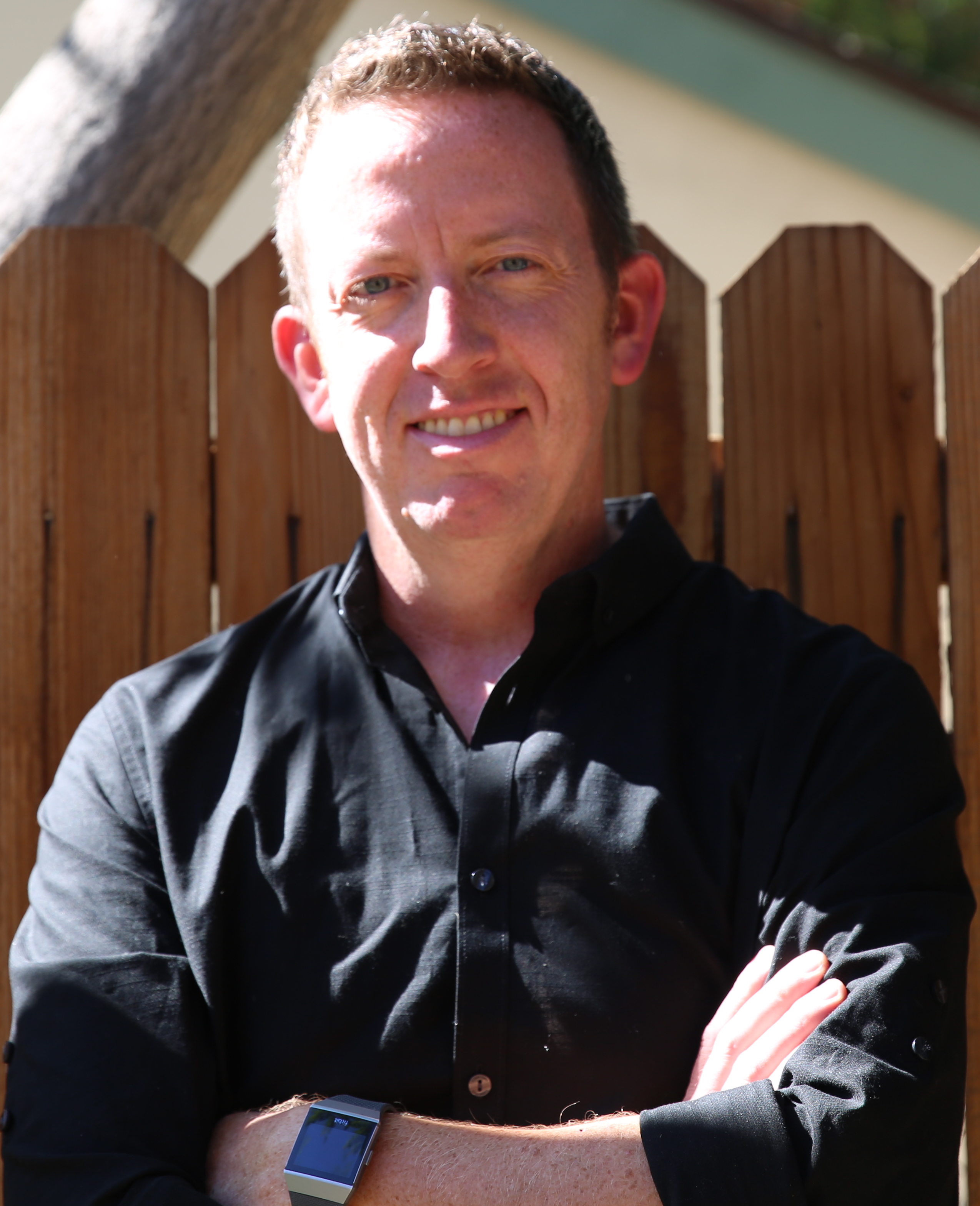
- Born: April 15, 1972 (age 54); Portland, Oregon, US
- Occupations: Activist, writer, filmmaker
- Website: CraigRosebraugh.com

Craig Rosebraugh (born April 15, 1972) is an American writer, filmmaker and activist advocating for political and social justice, and environmental and animal protection.

== Activism ==
A political activist since the early 1990s when he opposed the first Gulf War, Rosebraugh has been involved in a variety of human rights, environmental and animal protection campaigns. In 1996, he co-formed the Liberation Collective organization, a group based in Portland, Oregon that worked to bring together commonalities in various justice struggles. The same year he took part in a protest against the Seattle Fur Exchange, and was one of five people arrested for civil disobedience after blocking the entrance. In May of the same year, Rosebraugh was one of four people who blockaded the entrance to the Oregon Regional Primate Research Center in protest of primate experimentation. In 1997, Rosebraugh co-organized the 1997 Primate Tour, a series of vigils at the then seven regional primate research facilities in the United States. The same year, he took part in a national protest against the California Regional Primate Research Center at the University of California Davis, and was one of thirty-two people arrested for non-violent civil disobedience. In 1997, Rosebraugh also began acting as a spokesperson for the Animal Liberation Front and Earth Liberation Front. In 1998, he wrote the essay, Arguments Against The Use of Nonhuman Animals in Biomedical And Scientific Experimentation, where he seeks to examine the ethical implications of the experimentation on animals and refute its supposed contribution to the medical research for human health. The following year, Rosebraugh was a co-founder of the Coalition to End Primate Experimentation (CEPE) and served as the National Organizer for the 1999 Primate Freedom Tour, a four-month-long protest tour of the primary primate research facilities in the United States.

From 1997 to 2001, Rosebraugh served as a spokesperson for the Earth Liberation Front receiving anonymous communiques from the ELF and forwarding them on to news media internationally. In 1999, Rosebraugh co-formed the North American Earth Liberation Front Press Office (NAELFPO) with Leslie James Pickering, where he continued to forward communiques, conduct international press interviews, and nationwide informational lectures on the ideology of the ELF movement. Between 1997 and 2006, Rosebraugh received eight subpoenas to appear before federal grand juries to discuss his sources, but he has said he has no knowledge of them and refused to cooperate with the proceedings. The New York Times Magazine dubbed him the "Face of Ecoterrorism" in 1998.

Rosebraugh resigned his position as spokesperson on September 5, 2001, believing that a refocusing of strategies and tactics needed to occur to fully promote justice in the United States.

Despite the seizure of his computer equipment; searches of his business, person, and home; grand jury investigations; FBI and ATF questioning; facing years in prison and hundreds of death threats; he did not reveal the identities of members of the Earth Liberation Front and Animal Liberation Front movements.

Rosebraugh's first book, The Logic of Political Violence: Lessons in Reform and Revolution was published in 2003 and is a comparison study between the use of non-violence and politically motivated violence in historical justice struggles. His second book, Burning Rage of a Dying Planet: Speaking for the Earth Liberation Front was published in 2004 and is a memoir of his time speaking on behalf of the Earth Liberation Front. In 2009, Rosebraugh was the contributing editor of the book, This Country Must Change: Essays on the Necessity of Revolution in the U.S.A., a compilation of essays from prominent political prisoners and activists in the United States.

In the Summer of 2009, the first issue of his magazine, Resistance: Journal of the Earth Liberation Movement, was released. The magazine covers the actions and discusses the philosophy and tactics of earth liberation groups, such as the ELF and ALF.

Also in 2009, Rosebraugh co-formed Responsible Education and Media (R.E.M.), a non-profit organization in Los Angeles combining art and entertainment with a factual analysis of social and political issues impacting the global community to promote global justice. The group's projects have included full-page information advertisements in Los Angeles and Phoenix, Arizona newspapers railing against the use of ammonia in the nation's meat supply and Arizona Senate Bill 1070, the controversial immigration law.

== Restaurant owner ==
In January 2004, with the financial backing of his parents, Rosebraugh opened Calendula, then Portland's only all-vegan and organic restaurant. The restaurant was named one of the best vegetarian restaurants in North America in 2004 by VegNews Magazine. He was criticized in the local press for his treatment of his employees and for failing to adhere to principles he had espoused. Employees that he fired joined the Industrial Workers of the World (IWW) which organized a boycott of the restaurant. Rosebraugh spent $3,000 to defend himself in ads in the local alternative press. Other employees came to Rosebraugh's defense, accusing the IWW union as misguided and "barking up the wrong tree." He closed the restaurant in September 2004, and reopened it for a short time in December of that year. The restaurant closed for the final time during the final months of 2005.

== Filmography ==
Rosebraugh's screenplay, Burning Rage, was a quarterfinalist in the prestigious Francis Ford Coppola 2007 Zoetrope International Screenplay Competition and also in the 2009 Phoenix Film Festival Screenplay Competition. In 2009, Rosebraugh began working on a feature-length documentary entitled Greedy Lying Bastards, an investigation into the power and dominance of the fossil fuel industry. Filmed in fourteen countries during the first half of 2010, Greedy Lying Bastards was released theatrically in North America on March 8, 2013, in the UK on September 27, 2013, and is currently available in North America for digital download, video on demand and DVD sales. The President of One Earth Productions in Los Angeles, Rosebraugh's background includes significant work in both feature film and television scripted and non-scripted content and he has personally overseen numerous projects from conception and development, through financing and pre-production, into production, post-production and distribution. Rosebraugh additionally works as a consultant for independent filmmakers as well as continuing to write, direct, and produce content.

== Books ==
- This Country Must Change: Essays on the Necessity of Revolution in the USA (Arissa Media Group, 2009). ISBN 978-0-9742884-7-5
- Burning Rage of a Dying Planet: Speaking for the Earth Liberation Front (Lantern Books, 2004). ISBN 1-59056-064-7
- The Logic of Political Violence: Lessons in Reform and Revolution (Arissa Media Group, 2003). ISBN 0-9742884-1-1

== Education ==
- Tigard High School, Tigard, Oregon (1990)

Craig attended Linn-Benton Community College

- B.A. Social Sciences – Marylhurst University, Marylhurst, Oregon (1999)
- M.A. Political Theory/History – Goddard College, Plainfield, Vermont

At age 37, Rosebraugh went to law school.

- J.D. Arizona State University School of Law, Tempe, Arizona (2011)
- LL.M. Entertainment, Media and Intellectual Property University of California, Los Angeles School of Law, Los Angeles, California (2014)

== See also ==
- List of animal rights advocates
