= Communications management unit =

Restrictive group in US Federal Bureau of Prisons

A communications management unit (CMU) is a type of self-contained group within a facility in the United States Federal Bureau of Prisons that severely restricts, manages and monitors all outside communication (telephone, mail, visitation) of inmates in the unit.

== Origins ==
As part of the Bush administration's war on terrorism, the April 3, 2006, Federal Register included proposed rules by the Federal Bureau of Prisons (FBOP) that "Limited Communication for Terrorist Inmates". The changes were in response to criticism that the FBOP had not been adequately monitoring the communications of prisoners, permitting several terrorists convicted for the 1993 World Trade Center bombing to send letters to other terrorists overseas. "By concentrating resources in this fashion, it will greatly enhance the agency's capabilities for language translation, content analysis and intelligence sharing", according to a government statement released with the rules.

The public was given until June 2, 2006, to comment, as required by law. Civil liberty and human rights groups immediately questioned the constitutionality and stated that the provisions were so broad that they could be applied to non-terrorists, witnesses and detainees. The bureau appeared to abandon the program, but on December 11, 2006, a Communications Management Unit (CMU) was quietly implemented at Indiana's Federal Correctional Complex, Terre Haute. "From April to June 2010, the Federal Bureau of Prisons (BOP) opened up a period for public comment around the establishment of two Communications Management Units" with several civil rights groups and advocates "coming together to urge the federal Bureau of Prisons to close the experimental prison units." It is unclear who authorized the program. It was either the Justice Department Office of Legal Counsel, FBOP Director Harley Lappin or United States attorney general Alberto Gonzales.

== Communication restrictions ==
Compared to other inmates, those placed in the CMU have little contact with the outside world. At least $14 million is spent on surveillance of the CMUs. A counterterrorism team in West Virginia monitors verbal communication remotely.

=== Visitation ===
The CMU permits nine hours per month, with contact, meaning the visitor and inmate are in separate rooms with viewing through a glass window and talking via telephone. All conversations must be in English unless special permission is granted 10 days in advance. In addition to the already imposed restrictions, CMU "prisoners are banned from any physical contact with visiting friends and family, including babies, infants, and minor children."

=== Mail ===
Non-CMU prisoners can usually send and receive unlimited mail, where incoming mail is checked for contraband, then delivered to the inmate. With the exception of correspondence with lawyers and the courts, letters sent to and from the CMU are read, copied and evaluated before being released, which results in delays of a week or more.

=== Telephone ===
Convicts in the general population are permitted 300 phone minutes per month; rules in the CMU allow one call per week, limited to 15 minutes, and it must be in English unless special permission is granted 10 days in advance. The duration of the single call can be reduced to 3 minutes at the discretion of the warden.

== CMU 1, Terre Haute, Indiana ==
On February 25, 2007, The Washington Post reported the creation of a medium-security Communication Management Unit housing 213 inmates in Terre Haute. The staff monitors all telephone calls and mail, and requires that all inmate conversations occur in English unless special permission is arranged for conversations in other languages. It was physically situated in the former death row section, and all but two of the inmates are Arab Muslims, leading the American Civil Liberties Union (ACLU) to raise a concern about racial profiling. The ACLU also charged that the communication restrictions are unduly harsh for prisoners who are not sufficiently serious security threats to warrant placement in ADX Florence, the Supermax facility in Colorado. In 2020 it housed between 60-70 prisoners.

Current and former inmates include "American Taliban" John Walker Lindh, the Lackawanna Six, Abduwali Muse, Enaam Arnaout, Aldrich Ames, Brandon Russell, Kirksey Nix and Martin Gottesfeld.

== CMU 2, Marion, Illinois ==
Although the Supermax facility is gone, the United States Penitentiary, Marion, in 2008 became home to the other known Communication Management Unit in the federal prison system. The inmates are predominantly Arab Muslims, but it once housed Earth Liberation Front prisoner Daniel McGowan, after his involvement in two arsons at logging operations in Oregon. His sentence was given "terrorism enhancements" as authorized by the USA PATRIOT Act, during the Green Scare.

Animal Liberation Front prisoner Walter Edmund Bond was held at USP Marion CMU from January 2012 to March 2015. Bond served 12 years and 3 months for three counts of arson in relation to the ALF.

The Marion CMU also houses Richard Scutari, a former leader of the white supremacist revolutionary group The Order. Scutari was sentenced to a 60-year prison term in 1985. He was moved to the USP Marion CMU in July 2008.

== Traits of CMU and its prisoners ==
A 2011 story by NPR reported 50 units and 71 inmates at CMUs. It also described open cells, and a basketball court. A lawyer from ACLU has been inside the Terre Haute CMU. NPR also claimed to have identified dozens of inmates at the CMU and compiled a list on its website. The sorts of cases include:

- Cases involving material support of terrorist groups like Hamas or Hezbollah (and various charity frauds)
- Plots: 2005 Los Angeles bomb plot, Buffalo Six, Portland Seven, Liberty City Seven, 2004 New York City Subway plot, Toledo terror plot, Virginia Jihad Network, etc.
- Crime attempts from within jail, including threatening judges
- Various murder, bank robbery, and drug cases.

Ed Ross of the Bureau of Prisons said the units were designed for the following offenses:

- people convicted of terrorism,
- prisoners who have dealt drugs
- prisoners who tried to recruit or radicalize others
- prisoners who have abused their communications privileges by harassing victims, judges and prosecutors

The Terre Haute CMU restricts Muslim group prayer to once per week (once per day during Ramadan) according to a 2010 lawsuit filed by inmates Enaam Arnaout and John Walker Lindh. The suit alleges that the prison violates religious rights to pray five times per day, in a ritually clean place, "preferably in a group". On March 30, 2010, the Center for Constitutional Rights filed a lawsuit in the U.S. District Court for the District of Columbia on behalf of plaintiffs Yassin Muhiddin Aref, Avon Twitty, Daniel McGowan, Royal Jones, Kifah Jayyousi, Hedaya Jayyousi, and Jenny Synan "challenging policies and conditions at two experimental prison units that are being operated in Terre Haute, Indiana, and Marion, Illinois, as well as the circumstances under which they were established." As of 2011, a lawyer for the Center for Constitutional Rights estimates the Muslim population of CMUs at roughly 70 percent. They are also barred from praying together.

An ACLU lawsuit charged that CMUs of the federal prisons violate inmates' rights. In a Democracy Now! Interview on June 25, 2009, animal rights activist Andrew Stepanian, a member of Stop Huntingdon Animal Cruelty (SHAC), talked about being jailed at the CMU. Stepanian is believed to be the first prisoner released from a CMU.

== See also ==
- Political prisoner
- WriteAPrisoner.com
