= 2008 Seattle Street of Dreams arson =

Suspected eco-terrorism attacks in Echo Lake, Washington

Coordinates: 47°48′03″N 122°05′00″W

One of the three houses that were burned completely to the ground (a fourth was saved).

On March 3, 2008, four multimillion-dollar homes were set on fire in Echo Lake, Washington, on Echo Lake Road, off State Highway 522. Slogans spray-painted on one of the burned houses' fences attributed the arson to the Earth Liberation Front, with words such as "Built Green? Nope black! McMansions in RCDs r not green. ELF," ELF being the collective name for anonymous and autonomous individuals or groups who use "economic sabotage and guerrilla warfare to stop the exploitation and destruction of the natural environment".

The houses were built in the summer of 2007 as part of "Seattle Street of Dreams" project, an annual luxury home showcase offered across the United States and parts of Canada. The year's theme was "green and sustainable building"; one property had won an award from a local group known as BuiltGreen.

Immediately following the attack, residents and drivers within the area called nearby fire departments, who were able to save one of the four ignited houses. The fires caused $7 million worth of damage. No injuries were reported, as the homes were unoccupied at the time. The buildings were eventually rebuilt following the event.

The FBI, police, and the Bureau of Alcohol, Tobacco, Firearms and Explosives were unable to determine any suspects, and thus no arrests were made. Skepticism has arisen over whether the arson was truly an ELF action or an act of insurance fraud. The developer of one of the destroyed houses has since pleaded guilty to multiple counts of first-degree theft associated with his construction projects.
