= Operation Backfire (FBI) =

Multi agency operation against criminal actions by the radical environmental movement

- Operation name: Operation Backfire

Participants
- Executed by: FBI, ATF

Mission
- Target: Earth Liberation Front

Operation Backfire was a multi-agency criminal investigation, led by the Federal Bureau of Investigation (FBI), into destructive acts in the name of animal rights and environmental causes in the United States described as eco-terrorism by the FBI. The operation resulted in convictions and imprisonment of a number of people, many of whom were members of the Animal Liberation Front and Earth Liberation Front.

== Background ==
In 2004 the FBI merged seven independent investigations from its Portland, Oregon field office and called them Operation Backfire. According to an agency statement, the operational focus was on investigating acts of domestic terrorism, carried out on behalf of two activist groups, the Earth Liberation Front (ELF) and Animal Liberation Front (ALF).

== Arrests ==
In December 2005 and January 2006, with assistance from the Bureau of Alcohol, Tobacco, Firearms and Explosives (ATF), the FBI indicted six women and seven men on a total of 65 charges, including arson, conspiracy, use of destructive devices, and destruction of an energy facility. The defendants were named as Joseph Mahmoud Dibee, Chelsea Dawn Gerlach, Sarah Kendall Harvey (née Kendall Tankersley), Daniel McGowan, Stanislas Meyerhoff, Josephine Sunshine Overaker, Jonathan Paul, Rebecca Jeanette Rubin, Suzanne Savoie, Justin Franchi Solondz, Darren Thurston, Kevin Tubbs, and Briana Waters. A number of other unindicted co-conspirators were also named. A 13th alleged co-conspirator, William "Bill" Rodgers, also known as Avalon, committed suicide while in police custody.

According to reports, and their own websites, most of the indicted individuals initially claimed to be innocent of the charges. Prosecutors alleged that the 11 conspirators collectively referred to themselves as "The Family" and had taken an oath to protect each other. The FBI indicated that some of the charges relate to a 1998 arson attack, claimed by the ELF, on the Vail Ski Resort in Colorado. Other charges were related to another attack on the botany labs at the University of Washington in 2001. The combined cost of the damage from the attacks is estimated at approaching $80 million.

== Convictions and abscondings ==
In late 2006, a number of self-described ELF members pleaded guilty to arson and other charges in U.S. federal courts.

On November 11, 2006, Joyanna Zacher, Nathan Block, Daniel McGowan and Jonathan Paul pleaded guilty to several eco-sabotage related charges, as part of a global resolution agreement with prosecutors. Judge Ann Aiken presided over the hearings. The change of pleas from the four defendants resolves all current "Operation Backfire" cases in Oregon.

On December 15, 2006, Chelsea Dawn Gerlach and Stanislas Gregory Meyerhoff, pleaded guilty to $20 million worth of arsons committed between 1996 and 2001 by the Eugene-based cell of the ELF known as "The Family". Their fire-bombing of a Vail ski resort resulted in damages totaling $12 million, with the FBI characterizing the ELF as the United States' "top domestic terrorism threat". Gerlach has previously pleaded guilty to 18 counts of arson in other attacks, saying she was motivated by "a deep sense of despair and anger at the deteriorating state of the global environment," but adding that she has "since realized the firebombings did more harm than good." Meyerhoff has renounced ELF and pleaded guilty to 54 counts, but is still under indictment in Michigan, Arizona, Washington, Wyoming and California.

On March 6, 2008, Briana Waters, who was arrested in Operation Backfire for another ELF attack in Washington State, was found guilty of two counts of arson and sentenced later that year to six years in prison.

The FBI alleged that the group was led by William C. Rodgers, who was arrested in December 2005 and committed suicide in jail just before he was to be transferred to Oregon. Josephine Sunshine Overaker has not been apprehended; she is believed to be in Spain.

Justin Franchi Solondz was arrested in Dali, China in March 2009 on charges of growing marijuana. He pleaded guilty to manufacturing drugs in a daylong trial and was sentenced to three years in prison by a local court. He was deported back to the U.S. to face charges there after serving his sentence. On December 20, 2011, Solondz pleaded guilty. On March 16, 2012, Solondz was sentenced to seven years in prison.

Rebecca Jeanette Rubin surrendered to FBI agents at the Canada–US border in Blaine, Washington on 29 November 2012. On 10 October 2013, Rubin pleaded guilty. On 27 January 2014, Rubin was sentenced to five years in prison.

Joseph Mahmoud Dibee was apprehended in Cuba and returned to the US on 10 August 2018, after twelve years on the run. Dibee was believed to be beyond the reach of the FBI in Syria, which had no diplomatic relations with the United States, and was ultimately discovered to be traveling through Central America, en route to Russia. With the assistance of Cuban authorities, the FBI detained him before he could board a plane to Russia, and brought him to Portland for trial. On 21 April 2022, Dibee pleaded guilty. On 1 November 2022, Dibee was sentenced to time served.

Josephine Sunshine Overaker was at large as of 2026.

== Related operations ==
In January and February 2006, as a result of separate investigations, but widely reported as extensions of Operation Backfire, three more individuals, Zachary Jenson, Eric McDavid and Lauren Weiner, were arrested in Auburn, California for conspiring to damage facilities "by explosive or fire." Eric McDavid, the only one of the three who refused to sign a plea agreement, was found guilty on all counts and faces up to 20 years in prison, and a $250,000 fine, when sentenced on the 6th of December. In Washington, Nathan Block and Joyanna Zacher were arrested on charges relating to a 2001 arson on a farm near Clatskanie, Oregon and in Tucson, Arizona, Rod Coronado, a prominent American eco-anarchist, was arrested on a felony charge of demonstrating the use of a destructive device.

== Reactions ==
The indictments of the 18 activists for alleged acts of eco-terrorism drew condemnation from activists and alternative media organizations. The National Lawyers Guild condemned the operation and the resulting indictments, arguing that "life sentences for property damage offenses where the actor has no intent to harm an individual are simply unconstitutional." Animal rights activist Jerry Vlasak accused the FBI of targeting "a bunch of above-ground, well-known, peaceful animal-rights activists and environmental activists and charg[ing] them with being members of the ALF and the ELF."

In response, then-U.S. Attorney General Alberto R. Gonzales argued that "there's a clear difference between constitutionally protected advocacy — which is the right of all Americans — and violent criminal activity."

== See also ==
- Earth First!
- Ecotage
- Green Scare
- Jeff Luers
- Will Potter
- Craig Rosebraugh
- University of Washington firebombing incident
