= Vegan Prisoners Support Group =

UK organisation

- Abbreviation: VPSG
- Formation: April 1994; 32 years ago
- Founder: Jo-Ann Brown
- Purpose: Support for vegan prisoners
- Region served: United Kingdom
- Website: www.vpsg.org

The Vegan Prisoners Support Group (VPSG) is an organisation based in the United Kingdom that provides support for vegans in prison, primarily vegans who are imprisoned for crimes of conscience, but offers help to any genuine vegan in prison. There are around 800 vegans in British jails at any given time.

The VPSG is purely concerned with ensuring vegans in prison have access to suitable food, clothing and toiletries.

The group was founded in April 1994 by Jo-Ann Brown.

Since 1994, VPSG's work has grown, and it has been called upon to advise the prisons' ombudsman on disputes between prisoners and the prison service relating to vegan diets. The group succeeded in 2009 in obtaining for prisoners the right to place mail orders for vegan products from health-food stores.

== See also ==
- List of vegetarian and vegan organizations
