= Rural cluster development =

A rural cluster development (RCD) is a form of residential subdivision. In an RCD, houses are clustered together in areas zoned for larger properties. The remainder of the land is often designated open space. The effect is tract-home density in the middle of rural communities.
