= Environmental Life Force =

Environmental group

ELF logo

Environmental Life Force (ELF), also known as the Original ELF, was the first radical environmental group in 1977 to use explosive and incendiary devices to advance their agenda.

== History ==
The group was founded by John Clark Hanna, who was arrested and convicted for the use of explosives on federal property. The ELF conducted armed actions in northern California and Oregon and disbanded in 1978 following Hanna's arrest for placing incendiary devices on seven crop-dusters at the Salinas, California airport on May 1, 1977.

They said that "warfare" designed pesticides were being used on domestic crops, specifically a chemical banned after its extensive use in Vietnam. A communiqué to the Independent (Santa Cruz) later provided the group with a frontpage story. They also called for above-ground organizations to initiate a boycott of sprayed food and for the public to criticize the process:

The US Forest Service continues to apply 245T to kill broadleafed trees and shrubs in recently logged forests so conifers such as pine, fir and cedar trees can be re-established quickly.

There was also an article published in Open Road in August 1977 featuring the bombing at a paper publishing company in Oregon City. The target was against a company who the ELF claimed were responsible for using a dangerous chemical called Tordon for aerial spraying, used as part of a program in Vietnam and responsible for causing cancer and birth defects.

Although not much is known about the early ELF activists, because of their efforts to remain anonymous, John Hanna, who claims to have founded the movement along with other individuals, talks of how he used explosives against a target:

ELF took extraordinary measures to avoid loss of life or injury. The devices were designed so only the low-yield detonators would fire. The napalm mix had been allowed to solidify so it could not catch fire. The fuses were timed to ignite at 2:00 am. I waited nearby until all the detonators exploded. If someone would have happened by, I was prepared to warn him or her off, even at the risk of capture. Later in the day, a communique was dropped at the local newspaper. ELF listed viable alternatives to the excessive and inappropriate use of pesticides on our food.

Unlike his former years, Hanna no longer advocates militancy, although does not denounce it, only denouncing militancy that leads to violence. He instead promotes the adoption of legal measures, commenting: "I accomplished more for the environmental cause through my research organization and its spin-offs than I ever did as an eco-guerilla."

== Modern ELF ==
Several years later, the ELF acronym resurfaced, representing another ideologically similar decentralised eco-guerilla entity, the Earth Liberation Front, which borrowed tactics from the Animal Liberation Front. The two groups are otherwise unrelated.
