= Eric McDavid =

American green anarchist

Eric McDavid is an American green anarchist who was convicted of conspiring to use fire or explosives to damage corporate and government property and sentenced to 20 years in prison.

The trial revealed that McDavid's group had not decided whether or not to claim the planned actions in the name of the ELF. On January 8, 2015, after he spent eight years and 360 days in prison, McDavid's conviction was overturned after the prosecution conceded that the Federal Bureau of Investigation (FBI) had withheld thousands of pages of potentially exculpatory evidence.

== Sabotage plans ==
External videos
- Eric and "Anna", 14-minute video by The Intercept about the undercover operation

Together with Zach Jenson, Lauren Weiner, and "Anna" (Zoe Elizabeth Voss, a paid FBI informant) McDavid planned acts of arson and sabotage to the Nimbus Dam, United States Forest Service, and nearby utilities.

"Anna" had been working with the FBI to infiltrate the group since 2004. She encouraged their activities and provided them with bomb-making information, money to buy the raw materials, transportation and a cabin to work in, and produced consensual audio and video recordings of their activities. "Anna" made use of McDavid's attraction to her: he described her as his "soul twin" and said he had changed his behavior in order to please her. According to "Anna", McDavid threatened to kill her if she turned out to be working with law enforcement.

Defense attorney Mark Reichel argued that "Anna" acted as an agent provocateur: encouraging the group to focus on a target, paying for meeting arrangements and supplies, and urging the group to act when they wavered. Reichel said "Anna" taught McDavid, Jenson and Weiner how to make bombs and supervised their activities. Reichel stated at the trial, "the crisp $100 bills and a Dutch Flat cabin where the group lived in the days leading up to the trio's arrest—all supplied by 'Anna' thanks to her FBI sponsors ... That's the creation of a case ... Without 'Anna,' you have nothing."

== Arrest, conviction, and appeal ==
On January 13, 2006, the three were arrested outside a store where they had purchased household chemicals, presumably for bomb-making. None of the three had prior convictions. McDavid spent two years pre-trial in solitary confinement. He also formally declared a hunger strike due to the jail's refusal to provide him with vegan food. He was given vegan food intermittently. At their 2008 trials, Weiner and Jenson both pleaded guilty and testified against McDavid. His defense contended that he was the victim of entrapment. McDavid was convicted in 2007 and sentenced to 20 years in prison.

"Anna" was paid over $65,000 for her role in securing McDavid's conviction. Intelligence acquired from her deployment was used in 12 other prosecutions of anarchists. Within the anarchist, environmental and animal rights movements in the United States, "Anna"'s unmasking contributed to internal divisions and snitch-jacketing.

On May 6, 2009, McDavid's attorney filed an appeal. The appeal was denied in 2010.

== Release ==
On January 8, 2015, McDavid was released from prison after the FBI admitted it had withheld approximately 2,500 pages of documents potentially useful for his defense, which included love letters exchanged between "Anna" and McDavid and proof that she had been exempted from a requested FBI polygraph test by her handler, Special Agent Ricardo Torres. The release was made in exchange for his guilty plea to a lesser charge of general conspiracy.

== Pop culture references ==
In 2008, Laura Jane Grace released the song ‘Anna was a Stool Pigeon’, about Eric, Lauren and Zach (‘Eric, Ren and Jensen’), on her first solo album, Heart Burns.

== See also ==
- Veganarchism
- Green Scare
- Operation Backfire (FBI)
- COINTELPRO
- Camden 28
- UK undercover policing relationships scandal
