= Earth Liberation Prisoners Support Network =

The Earth Liberation Prisoners Support Network (ELPSN), also known as Spirit of Freedom, is a network to provide information on people imprisoned for direct action relating to campaigns on environmental and other issues. It includes earth liberationists, animal liberationists, those fighting on anti-war, anti-nuclear and peace issues, indigenous struggles, anti-fascism, land rights, ploughshares and more.

== History ==
The network was set up in the UK in 1993 after the growth of the UK Earth First! and Earth Liberation Front (ELF) groups. At that time there was a sharp rise in the number of actions relating to the environment and a corresponding rise in the number of arrests. The network was initially called the (H)ELP Support Group. The name was chosen to be non-sectarian and neither linked to the ELF or Earth First!. The name changed in 1994 when Noel Molland of Green Anarchist magazine took over the group. In 1995 Molland was arrested and convicted for Conspiracy to Incite Criminal Damage in the GANDALF trial.

Since that time the network has spread internationally. It provides regular news on current prisoners and contact details of their support networks. It currently features a variety of prisoners, from various anonymous leaderless resistance movements and established groups such as the ELF (including the Green Scare prisoners), Animal Liberation Front, MOVE, SHAC 7, Antifa, Lecce Five and the SNGP campaigners.

== See also ==
- Earth Liberation Front Press Office
- Vegan Prisoners Support Group (VPSG)
- Animal Liberation Front Supporters Group (ALFSG)
