= Earth liberation =

Part of radical environmentalism

Earth liberation is an ideology founded by the radical environmental movement and was popularised by the Earth Liberation Front (ELF) as well as the Earth Liberation Army (ELA) in the 1990s.

== History ==
Earth liberation has no universal understanding as a concept, as it is much considered to be a part of radical environmentalism, or as a militant offshoot, favouring instead radical and revolutionary environmentalism.

== As a movement ==
Earth liberationists reject the mainstream environmental movement and include a diversity of individuals with a variety of different ideologies as well as theories. Activists include animal liberationists, anti-capitalists, green anarchists, deep ecologists, eco-feminists and anti-globalisationists. They are notably also within the ELF and ELA, with others from the Animal Liberation Front (ALF) and Class War.

A primary concern is making long lasting, systemic change, by overturning contemporary social and ecological conditions, as part of an earth liberation movement, similar to the aims of the animal liberation movement.
