= Jeff Luers =

American political activist

- Born: Downey, California, U.S.
- Other name: Jeff "Free" Luers
- Occupation: Activist
- Penalty: 10 years

Details
- Location: Oregon State Penitentiary
- Weapon: Improvised Incendiary Devices

Jeffrey "Free" Luers is an American political activist from Los Angeles, California, who served a ten-year prison sentence for an arson motivated by environmental concerns. On February 14, 2007, the Oregon Court of Appeals overturned Luers' sentence, instructing the Lane County circuit court to determine a new sentence. That court reduced the sentence from 22 years, 8 months to 10 years in February 2008, after what The Independent described as an "international campaign for a more appropriate sentence for a crime in which no one was hurt."

== Arson ==
The first incident took place in Eugene, Oregon in the United States when Luers and Craig Marshall planted crude delay devices for an attempted arson of trucks at the Tyree Oil Company. The two placed a section of cloth, which was draped over a gallon milk jug filled with a fuel and soap mixture, in the fuel tank of a double-trailer fuel truck. According to authorities, the potential blast could have caused damage over two city blocks.

On June 16, 2000, he set fire to three light trucks at Romania Chevrolet dealership suspectedly via the use of bombs, in Eugene as a protest against excessive consumption and global warming, along with Craig "Critter" Marshall, who was sentenced to five and a half years in prison. The arson destroyed three pickup trucks including a 2000 Silverado. Luers might have received a comparable sentence if he had not been convicted of an earlier attempted arson as well. Luers was initially sentenced to 22 years, 8 months in prison. Supporters argued that his sentence was excessive, because no one was injured and property damage was estimated at only $40,000

Luers has at times been a cause célèbre among some radicals, anti-prison activists, and individuals associated with the Earth Liberation Front (ELF), although Luers has said that he does not consider himself to be an ELF member.

Luers was mistakenly released early from prison in October 2009 after an error calculating his sentence. He returned to prison after visiting his parole officer. In 2007, the Oregon Court of Appeals overturned his sentence. Leurs left prison in December 2009, after serving almost ten years.

== Personal life ==
Luers identifies as an anarchist.

== See also ==
- Green anarchism
- Green Scare
- Rod Coronado
- Tre Arrow
- Marius Mason
