= List of environmental films =

This article lists film and television works which feature or discuss the environment, environmentalism or environmental issues.

Some notable and commercially successful films have featured environmental themes and are commemorated through several environmental film festivals held annually. The Annual Environmental Media Awards have been presented by the Environmental Media Association (EMA) since 1991 to the best television episode or film with an environmental message.

== List of documentary films about the environment ==
This is a list of documentary films related to the environment.

Title	Theme(s) and subtheme(s)	Author(s)	Year(s)
The 11th Hour	Global warming, deforestation, mass species extinction, social responsibility, Conservation movement	Nadia Conners, Leonardo DiCaprio, and Leila Conners Petersen	2007
All That Breathes	Air pollution	Shaunak Sen	2022
Angry Inuk	Hunting: seal hunting	Alethea Arnaquq-Baril	2016
Anima mundi	WWF	Godfrey Reggio	1991
The Antarctica Challenge: A Global Warning	Climate Change research in Antarctica	Mark Terry	2009
Anthropocene: The Human Epoch	How humans have impacted the planet	Jennifer Baichwal, Nicholas de Pencier, Edward Burtynsky	2019
Ashes to Honey	Nuclear power: radiation	Hitomi Kamanaka	2011
Baraka	Natural phenomena, Human behavior	Ron Fricke	1992
Before the Flood	Global Climate Change	Mark Monroe	2016
Before Vanishing	Water pollution: Barada (river)	Joude Gorani	2005
The Bell of Chernobyl	Chernobyl nuclear disaster	Rollan Sergienko	1987
Bhopal Express	Air pollution: from a pesticide factory	Prasoon Pandey and Piyush Pandey	1999
Bigger Than Us	Various themes	Flore Vasseur and Melati Wijsen	2021
Bill Nye: Science Guy	Global warming	David Alvarado and Jason Sussberg	2017
Biùtiful cauntri	Pollution: toxic waste dumping in Southern Italy	Esmeralda Calabria and Andrea D'Ambrosio	2007
Black Hole	Coal mining: Australia	João Dujon Pereira	2015
Blue Vinyl	Pollution: production and disposal of polyvinyl chloride	Daniel B. Gold and Judith Helfand	2002
Burning the Future: Coal in America	Mining: mountaintop removal mining	David Novack and Richard Hankin	2008
The Burning Season (1994)	Forests: Amazon rainforest	William Mastrosimone	1994
The Burning Season (2008)	Forests: deforestation in Indonesia	Cathy Henkel	2008
Butterfly	Environmentalism: resisting clearcutting	Doug Wolens	2000
Cane Toads: The Conquest	Introduced species: cane toads in Australia	Mark Lewis	2010
Cane Toads: An Unnatural History	Introduced species: cane toads in Australia	Mark Lewis	1988
The Chances of the World Changing	Endangered species: turtles	Eric Daniel Metzgar	2006
Chasing Ice	Global warming	James Balog	2012
Chasing Coral	Global warming, Coral bleaching, Climate Change	Jeff Orlowski	2017
Chernobyl Heart	Chernobyl disaster: acute radiation syndrome	Maryann DeLeo	2003
Children of Tsunami: No More Tears	Natural disasters: 2004 Indian Ocean earthquake and tsunami	Satya Sivaraman, Nur Raihan, Suren de Silva, and Pipope Panitchpakdi	2005
The City Dark	Light pollution	Ian Cheney	2011
Climate Refugees	Climate change: effects on natural resources	Michael P. Nash	2010
Climate Warriors	Climate change, renewable energy	Carl-A. Fechner	2018
Clouds of Smoke	Global warming	Fatmir Terziu	2007
Colombia Magia Salvaje	Colombian biodiversity and environmental protection	Mike Slee	2015
The Cove	Hunting: dolphin drive hunting	Mark Monroe	2009
Cowspiracy: The Sustainability Secret	Animal husbandry, policies of environmental organizations, global warming, water use, deforestation, and ocean dead zones,	Kip Andersen and Keegan Kuhn	2014
Crude (2007)	Petroleum industry: peak oil and climate change	Richard Smith	2007
Crude (2009)	Petroleum industry: pollution and class action	Joe Berlinger	2009
A Crude Awakening: The Oil Crash	Peak oil, Petroleum industry	Basil Gelpke and Ray McCormack	2006
Dark Waters	Water Pollution: Chemical Industry, Class Action	Nathaniel Rich, Mario Correa, Matthew Michael Carnahan	2019
Darwin's Nightmare	Lake Victoria	Hubert Sauper	2004
Dead Ahead: The Exxon Valdez Disaster	Petroleum industry: Exxon Valdez oil spill, United States Environmental Protection Agency, disaster response	Paul Seed	1992
Deadly Deception: General Electric, Nuclear Weapons and Our Environment	Energy: nuclear weapons	Debra Chasnoff	1991
Dreamland	Dams: Kárahnjúkar Hydropower Plant in Iceland	Þorfinnur Guðnason, Andri Snær Magnason	2009
Dust to Dust: The Health Effects of 9/11	Air pollution: from September 11 attacks, United States Environmental Protection Agency	Heidi Dehncke-Fisher	2006
Earth	Environmental change: effects on three particular species	Alastair Fothergill, Mark Linfield, and Leslie Megahey	2007
Earth Days	Environmentalism: environmental movement in the United States	Robert Stone	2009
Eco-Pirate: The Story of Paul Watson	Hunting: anti-whaling	Trish Dolman	2011
Elemental	Water pollution: Ganges River	Emmanuel Vaughan-Lee, Gayatri Roshan	2012
Erin Brockovich	Energy development: water pollution	Susannah Grant	2000
The End of Eden	Environmental degradation: cattle ranching	Rick Lomba	1986
Fight for the Planet	Global warming, Social responsibility	Colin Carter	2009
Final Straw: Food, Earth, Happiness	Food, farming, natural farming, biophilia	Patrick M. Lydon and Suhee Kang	2015
Flow: For Love of Water	Water privatization: big business and the natural environment	Irena Salina, Steven Starr	2008
Food, Inc.	Agriculture: corporate farming, Sustainable agriculture, meat industry, Intensive farming, food labelling regulations	Robert Kenner	2009
Forbidden Forest	Forests: sustainable forest management	Kevin W. Matthews	2004
Forests for the 21st Century	Forests: reforestation, carbon emissions	Forestry Commission of Great Britain, IUCN	2009
The Forgotten District	Forests: ecotourism in Belize	Oliver Dickinson	2008
The Fourth Revolution: Energy	Energy: renewable energy	Carl-A. Fechner	2010
Fractured Land	Environmentalism: awareness of hydraulic fracturing, First Nations	Fiona Rayher and Damien Gillis	2015
The Future of Food	Agriculture: genetically modified food	Deborah Koons Garcia	2004
Garbage Warrior	Garbage Warrior	Oliver Hodge	2007
Global Warming: The Signs and The Science	Global warming	Alanis Morissette	2005
Global Warming: What You Need to Know	Global warming	Nicolas Brown	2006
GMO OMG	Genetically modified organisms, Monsanto	Jeremy Seifert, Elizabeth Kucinich	2013
The Great Global Warming Swindle	Global warming: climate change denial	Martin Durkin	2007
The Great Warming	Global warming: politics of global warming, Climate change mitigation, Climate change policy of the United States	Michael Taylor	2006
Haida Gwaii: On the Edge of the World	General environment of Haida Gwaii, Rising sea level, natural disaster, climate change	Charles Wilkinson	2015
Haulout (short)	Global warming, Walruses, Impacts on marine mammals	Maxim Arbugaev, Evgenia Arbugaeva	2022
Home	Various themes	Yann Arthus-Bertrand	2009
How to Change the World	Environmentalism: Greenpeace	Jerry Rothwell	2015
Ice and the Sky	Global warming: Antarctic	Luc Jacquet	2015
The Idiot Cycle	Chemical industry: genetically modified organisms	Emmanuelle Schick Garcia	2009
If a Tree Falls: A Story of the Earth Liberation Front	Forests: eco-terrorism	Marshall Curry and Matthew Hamacheck	2011
If You Love This Planet	Nuclear weapons, Nuclear power in the United States, Nuclear policy of the United States	Terre Nash	1982
An Inconvenient Sequel: Truth to Power	Climate change: activity of Al Gore	Bonni Cohen, Jon Shenk	2017
An Inconvenient Truth	Global warming	Al Gore	2006
An Inconvenient Truth...Or Convenient Fiction?	Global warming	Steven F. Hayward	2007
Journey to the Safest Place on Earth	Radioactive waste	Edgar Hagen	2013
La Jungle plate	Wadden Sea	Johan van der Keuk	1978
Laloorinu Parayanullathu	Environment of India: municipal waste in Laloor	Sathish Kalathil	2012
The Last Animals	Endangered species	Kate Brooks	2017
The Last Paradises: On the Track of Rare Animals	Endangered species	Eugen Schuhmacher	1967
March of the Penguins	Wildlife: Emperor penguins	Luc Jacquet, National Geographic	2005
Material Of The Future	Controversies of plastic recycling, plastic pollution, plastic industry, bioplastics	Vern Moen	2014
The Messenger	Songbirds: bird conservation	Su Rynard	2015
Minamata: The Victims and Their World	Water pollution: mercury poisoning	Noriaki Tsuchimoto	1971
Mountaintop Removal (film)	Mining: mountaintop removal mining	Michael O'Connell	2007
No Impact Man	Sustainability: sustainable living		2009
No Pressure	Climate change mitigation	Richard Curtis and Franny Armstrong	2010
Oil on Ice	Petroleum industry: Arctic Refuge drilling controversy	Stephen Most	2004
Oil Sands Karaoke	Petroleum industry: oil sands of Alberta		2013
On the Line	Petroleum industry: Enbridge Northern Gateway Pipelines	Frank Wolf	2011
Out of Balance	ExxonMobil funding climate change deniers: climate change	Tom Jackson	2006
Pandora's Promise	Nuclear power and climate change	Robert Stone	2013
Pig Feast	Deforestation. Indigenous communities.		2026
Polluting Paradise	Waste management: in Turkey	Fatih Akın	2012
The Power of Community: How Cuba Survived Peak Oil	Peak oil: anti-consumerism, urban agriculture, energy dependence, and sustainability	Faith Morgan	2006
The Redwoods	Forests: protection of redwoods	Trevor Greenwood, Mark Jonathan Harris	1967
Power to Change - The Energy Rebellion	renewable energy, energy transition, global warming	Carl-A. Fechner	2016
Powerful: Energy for Everyone	Energy: renewable energy	David Chernushenko	2010
Raoni	The life of Raoni Metuktire. The film portrays issues surrounding on Kayapo people and the Amazon rainforest.	Jean-Pierre Dutilleux and Luiz Carlos Saldanha	1978
Renewal	Environmentalism: environmental movement in the United States, religious-environmental movement	Marty Ostrow, Terry Kay Rockefeller	2008
The Return of Navajo Boy	Uranium mining in the United States, environmental racism, uranium pollution	Jeff Spitz	2000
Revenge of the Electric Car	Sustainable design: electric cars	Chris Paine and P.G. Morgan	2011
Revolution	Various themes, including environmental collapse	Rob Stewart	2012
The Rise and Fall of the Great Lakes (short)	Various themes, including ice age and anthropogenic change	Bill Mason, National Film Board of Canada	1968
Sea of Life	Various themes, including ocean acidification and overfishing	Julia Barnes	2016
Search for the Super Battery	Energy: energy storage devices, including batteries	Daniel McCabe	2017
Semper Fi: Always Faithful	Water pollution: Camp Lejeune water contamination	Rachel Libert and Tony Hardmon	2011
Sexy Killers	Environmental impact of the coal industry in Indonesia	Dandhy Dwi Laksono and Ucok Suparta	2019
Sharkwater	Endangered species: sharks	Rob Stewart	2007
The Shiranui Sea	Water pollution: mercury poisoning	Noriaki Tsuchimoto	1975
Shored Up	Weather: Hurricane Sandy: rising sea level	Ben Kalina	2013
Silent Storm	Nuclear weapons testing: radioactive contamination	Peter Butt	2003
The Story of Stuff	Product lifecycle management: anti-consumerism	Annie Leonard	2007
Surviving the Tsunami - My Atomic Aunt	Nuclear power: Fukushima Daiichi nuclear disaster	Kyoko Miyake	2013
That Should Not Be: Our Children Will Accuse Us	Agriculture: agrochemicals	Jean-Paul Jaud	2008
This Changes Everything	Climate change. Companion project of the book This Changes Everything: Capitalism vs. the Climate by Naomi Klein	Avi Lewis	2015
Tomorrow (Demain)	Sustainable communities	Cyril Dion and Mélanie Laurent	2015
The Toxic Clouds of 9/11: A Looming Disaster	Air pollution: from September 11 attacks	Alison Johnson	2006
Toxic Legacy	Air pollution: from September 11 attacks	Susan Teskey	2006
Trash Inc: The Secret Life of Garbage	Waste management: landfills	Alison O'Brien, Carl Quintanilla	2010
The True Cost	Garment industry, consumerism, river and soil pollution, pesticide contamination, fair trade, sustainable clothing	Andrew Morgan	2015
Ultimate Tornado	Unusually violent tornadoes in the United States	National Geographic Channel	2006
Unacceptable Levels	Environmental toxicology	Edward Brown	2013
Under the Dome	Air pollution in China	Chai Jing	2015
Vanishing of the Bees	Honey bees: colony collapse disorder	Maryam Henein, George Langworthy, and James Erskine	2009
Vanishing Point	Climate change: Arctic sea ice decline	Marina Endicott and others	2012
Virunga	Wildlife conservation: Democratic Republic of the Congo	Orlando von Einsiedel	2014
Voices of Transition	Agriculture: energy and resource scarcity	Nils Aguilar	2012
Walking Through A Minefield	Uranium mining in Australia	Cathy Henkel	1999
Watch	Forests: clearcutting	Briana Waters	2001
Watermark	Water	Jennifer Baichwal and Edward Burtynsky	2013
What a Way to Go: Life at the End of Empire	Various themes: peak oil, climate change, overpopulation, and species extinction	Timothy S. Bennett	2007
What Is the Electric Car?	Sustainable design: electric cars	Ken Grant and Scott DuPont	2010
White Light/Black Rain: The Destruction of Hiroshima and Nagasaki	Atomic bombings of Hiroshima and Nagasaki: acute radiation syndrome	Steven Okazaki	2007
Who Killed the Electric Car?	Sustainable design: electric cars and roles of industries and governments	Chris Paine	2006
Wind Over Water: The Cape Wind Story	Energy: Cape Wind	Ole Tangen Jr.	2003
Windfall	Wind power: environmental impact of wind power	Laura Israel	2010
The World According to Monsanto	Agriculture: Monsanto	Marie-Monique Robin	2008
The Plow That Broke the Plains	Dust Bowl	Pare Lorentz	1936
The River	Erosion: Mississippi River	Pare Lorentz	1938
De platte jungle/Flat Jungle	Wadden Sea, overfishing, nuclear energy, water pollution, Overexploitation	Johan van der Keuken	1978
The Atomic Cafe	Nuclear warfare	Jayne Loader, Kevin Rafferty and Pierce Rafferty	1982
Koyaanisqatsi	Various themes, including natural landscape, urbanization, development	Godfrey Reggio with Philip Glass	1982
Trashed	Waste and pollution of air, land and sea	Candida Brady	2012

== List of fictional films about the environment ==
Some fictional films are based on true events.

Title	Theme(s) and subtheme(s)	Author(s)	Year(s)
2012	Natural disasters: 2012 phenomenon	Harald Kloser and Roland Emmerich	2009
Absurdistan	Water shortage in drought-stricken area, sex strike	Veit Helmer	2008
The Age of Stupid	Climate change	Franny Armstrong	2009
Aftermath	Nuclear warfare	Christian McDonald	2012
Ark	Pollution vs. nature	Rolf Forsberg	1970
L'An 01	Consumerism, Ecology	Jacques Doillon, Alain Resnais and Jean Rouch	1973
First Reformed	Climate change	Paul Schrader	2017
Avatar	Natural resources and deforestation	James Cameron	2009
Avatar: The Way of Water	Overfishing/Whaling	James Cameron	2022
Beyond the Pole	Climate Change	David L. Williams	2009
Beasts of the Southern Wild	Melting ice caps	Benh Zeitlin	2012
Carface	Petroleum industry: car culture		2015
The China Syndrome	Energy: nuclear meltdown	Mike Gray, T.S. Cook, and James Bridges	1979
A Civil Action	Water pollution: by trichloroethylene	Steven Zaillian	1998
Climate Change Denial Disorder	Climate change denial	Nicol Paone	2015
The Day After Tomorrow	Climate change	Roland Emmerich and Jeffrey Nachmanoff	2004
The Day the Earth Stood Still	Humankind's environmental damage to the planet	Scott Derrickson	2008
Denmark	Pollution: water pollution		2010
Don't Look Up	Climate change denial, politics of climate change	Adam McKay and David Sirota	2021
Dreams	Pollution vs. nature	Akira Kurosawa	1990
Earthquake	Earthquake in Los Angeles	George Fox and Mario Puzo	1974
Earthquake in Chile	Earthquake in Chile	Helma Sanders-Brahms	1975
FernGully: The Last Rainforest	Forests: rainforests		1992
Fire Down Below	Pollution: from mining		1997
Le Fleuve aux grandes eaux		Frédéric Back	1993
Fly Away Home	Wildlife: Canada goose	Bill Lishman, Robert Rodat, and Vince McKewin	1996
Flow	Flooding	Gints Zilbalodis	2024
Futurama: Into the Wild Green Yonder	Natural resources and Wildlife	Peter Avanzino	2009
Godzilla: King of the Monsters	Climate change, human impact on the environment, radical environmentalism, eco-terrorism	Michael Dougherty	2019
Gorillas in the Mist	Gorilla conservation and life of Dian Fossey	Michael Apted	1988
H2O	Water supply: Kaveri River water dispute in India	Upendra	2000
The Happening	Toxicology	M. Night Shyamalan	2008
Happy Feet	Environment of Antarctica	Warren Coleman, John Collee, George Miller, and Judy Morris	2006
Hell and High Water	Atomic bomb explosion in the Cold War	Jesse L. Lasky, Jr., Samuel Fuller, and David Hempstead	1954
How to Blow Up a Pipeline	Climate change, Environmental justice	Daniel Goldhaber	2022
If You Love Your Children	Climate change	Sanjay Patel (filmmaker)	2014
La Belle Verte		Coline Serreau	1996
If You Love Your Children	Climate change	Sanjay Patel (filmmaker)	2014
La Belle Verte		Coline Serreau	1996
The Lorax	Forests	Dr. Seuss	2012
The Man Who Planted Trees	Reforestation	Frédéric Back	1987
mother!	Mother Nature as an environmental allegory	Darren Aronofsky	2017
Muro Ami	Fishing: illegal, unreported and unregulated fishing	Marilou Diaz-Abaya	1999
Nausicaä of the Valley of the Wind	Conservation: insects	Hayao Miyazaki	1984
Night Moves	Climate change: The environmental impact of reservoirs, radical environmentalism	Kelly Reichardt	2013
Noah	Pollution and flooding	Darren Aronofsky	2014
Okja	Animal cruelty and food security under extreme population growth	Bong Joon-ho	2017
On Deadly Ground	Pollution: from petroleum industry	Ed Horowitz and Robin U. Russin	1994
Once Upon a Forest	Forests		1993
A Place to Fight For	Deforestation, Zone to Defend in France, environmental justice	Romain Cogitore	2023
Paddle to the Sea	Various themes	Holling C. Holling, Bill Mason, National Film Board of Canada	1966
Plastic Bag	Plastic bags	Ramin Bahrani and Jenni Jenkins	2009
Pom Poko	Deforestation: wildlife displacement	Isao Takahata, Hayao Miyazaki, Kenji Miyazawa	1994
Princess Mononoke	Technology vs. nature	Hayao Miyazaki	1997
Rio 2	Deforestation in Brazil	Carlos Saldanha	2014
The Roots of Heaven	Conservation of elephant herds from poaching	John Huston, Romain Gary	1958
Safe	Multiple chemical sensitivity	Todd Haynes	1995
San Andreas	Earthquake in California		2015
Sharknado	Severe weather and sharks	Thunder Levin	2013
Silent Running	Deforestation	Deric Washburn, Michael Cimino and Steven Bochco	1972
The Simpsons Movie	Pollution	David Silverman	2007
Sizzle	Global warming	Randy Olson	2009
Snowpiercer	Climate change	Bong Joon-ho	2013
Soylent Green	Natural resources, pollution, global warming, Human overpopulation	Richard Fleischer	1973
Space Tourists	Pollution: space debris		2002
Star Trek IV: The Voyage Home	Wildlife: Humpback whale		1986
Super Comet: After The Impact	Impact event		2007
Tentacles	Wildlife: gigantic octopus	Steven W. Carabatsos, Tito Carpi, Jerome Max, and Sonia Molteni	1977
Through Rocks and Clouds	Mining pollution	Franco García Becerra	2024
WALL-E	Waste management		2008
The War Game	Nuclear warfare	Peter Watkins	1965
Waterworld	Climate change	Kevin Reynolds (director)	1965
Wind Across the Everglades	Conservation biology: poaching	Nicholas Ray	1958
Woman at War	Halla, a choir conductor and eco-activist, plans to disrupt the operations of a Rio Tinto aluminium plant in the Icelandic highlands, purposely damaging electricity pylons and wires to cut their power supply.	Benedikt Erlingsson & Ólafur Egill Egilsson	2018

== Television ==
Title	Theme(s) and subtheme(s)	Producer(s)	Year(s)
Extrapolations	Climate change	Scott Z. Burns	2020
The Head	Climate change		2020–2025
Occupied	Clean energy		2015–2020
Saving Britain's Past	Cultural heritage	Mary Sackville-West	2009
The Truth About Wildlife	Wildlife: United Kingdom	Simon Willis	2011
Years of Living Dangerously	Climate change	James Cameron, Jerry Weintraub and Arnold Schwarzenegger	2014, 2016
Millennium: Tribal Wisdom and the Modern World (series of videos)	Various themes, including local knowledge	David Maybury-Lewis	1992
Hinterland Who's Who	Wildlife	Environment Canada Wildlife Service and the National Film Board of Canada	1960s, 1970s, 2000s

== See also ==
- Timeline of history of environmentalism
- Green Film Network
- green.tv, a website dedicated to showing environmental films clips
- DC Environmental Film Festival
- Eco-terrorism in fiction
- List of eco-horror films
- Environmentalism in The Lord of the Rings
- List of environmental film festivals
- List of films about nuclear issues
- National Film Award for Best Non-Feature Environment/Conservation/Preservation Film
- Pastoral genre of literature, art, or music
  - Pastoral literature
  - Pastoral science fiction
