= Eco-terrorism in fiction =

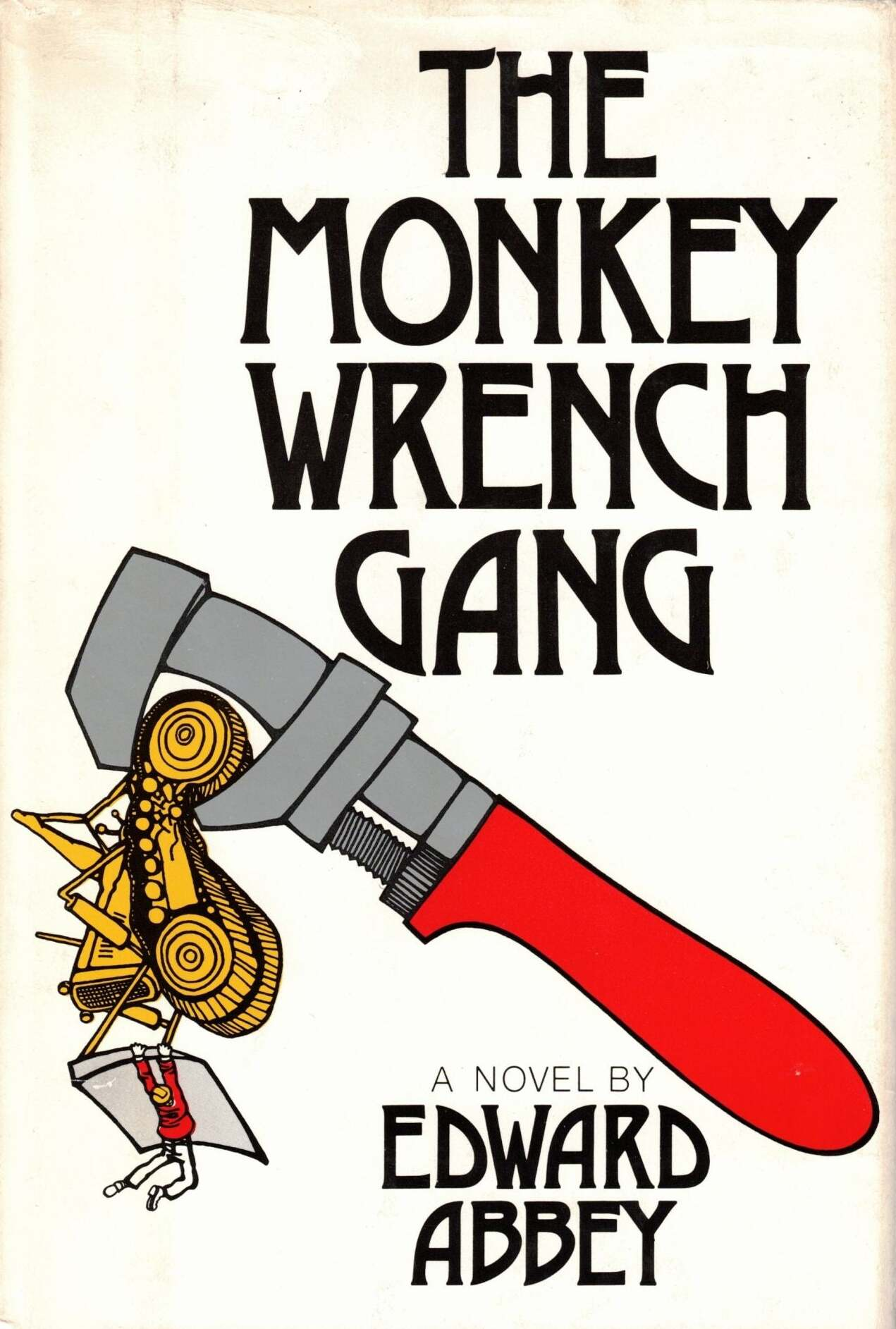
Cover of The Monkey Wrench Gang by Edward Abbey.

The seminal work of fiction featuring eco-terrorism as a major focal point is Edward Abbey's 1975 novel The Monkey Wrench Gang, wherein a group of environmentalists disrupt various projects that are damaging to the environment. The novel inspired the Earth First! movement and directly influenced the Earth Liberation Front. The term "monkeywrenching", in the sense of sabotage, derives from the book. The 1985 film Pale Rider, directed by and starring Clint Eastwood, likewise frames eco-terrorism positively; in the film, the vigilante justice morality which is a common feature of the Western genre is applied to environmentally destructive mining practices. In contrast, Michael Crichton's 2004 novel State of Fear portrays eco-terrorists—in this case a group of environmentalists who seek to raise awareness about anthropogenic global warming by creating extreme weather events—in a negative light.

The Exxon Valdez oil spill in 1989 precipitated an increase in eco-terrorism appearing in fiction. Examples include Paul Di Filippo's 1993 short story "Up the Lazy River" and Rebecca Ore's 1995 novel Gaia's Toys. Besides film and literature, the theme has also appeared in video games such as Final Fantasy VII. In more recent years, eco-terrorist antagonists such as those in the 2018 superhero films Aquaman and Avengers: Infinity War have been portrayed as being right about the issues but wrong about the solutions. The portrayal of eco-terrorist protagonists also shifted in the second half of the 2010s; whereas in earlier works such as the 2013 film Night Moves they would be motivated by idealism, later works such as the 2017 film First Reformed and the 2018 novel The Overstory have them motivated by the existential dread of perceiving human society as fundamentally unsustainable in relation to nature. Research analyzing 32 "commercially and culturally significant" fiction films' portrayals of eco-terrorism—released between 1972 and 2023—found that depictions tended to show more extreme acts of environmentally-motivated violence as morally illegitimate, with more recent and commercially successful films tending to favor binary hero–villain characterizations over morally complex narratives.

== See also ==
- Environmental issues in film and television
- List of environmental films
- Climate fiction
