= Laksono =

Laksono is a name of Indonesian origin. Notable people with the surname include:

- Agung Laksono (born 1949), Indonesian politician and businessman
- Dandhy Laksono (born 1976), Indonesian activist, investigative journalist, and filmmaker
