= Thicket =

Dense stand of trees, shrubs, or vines

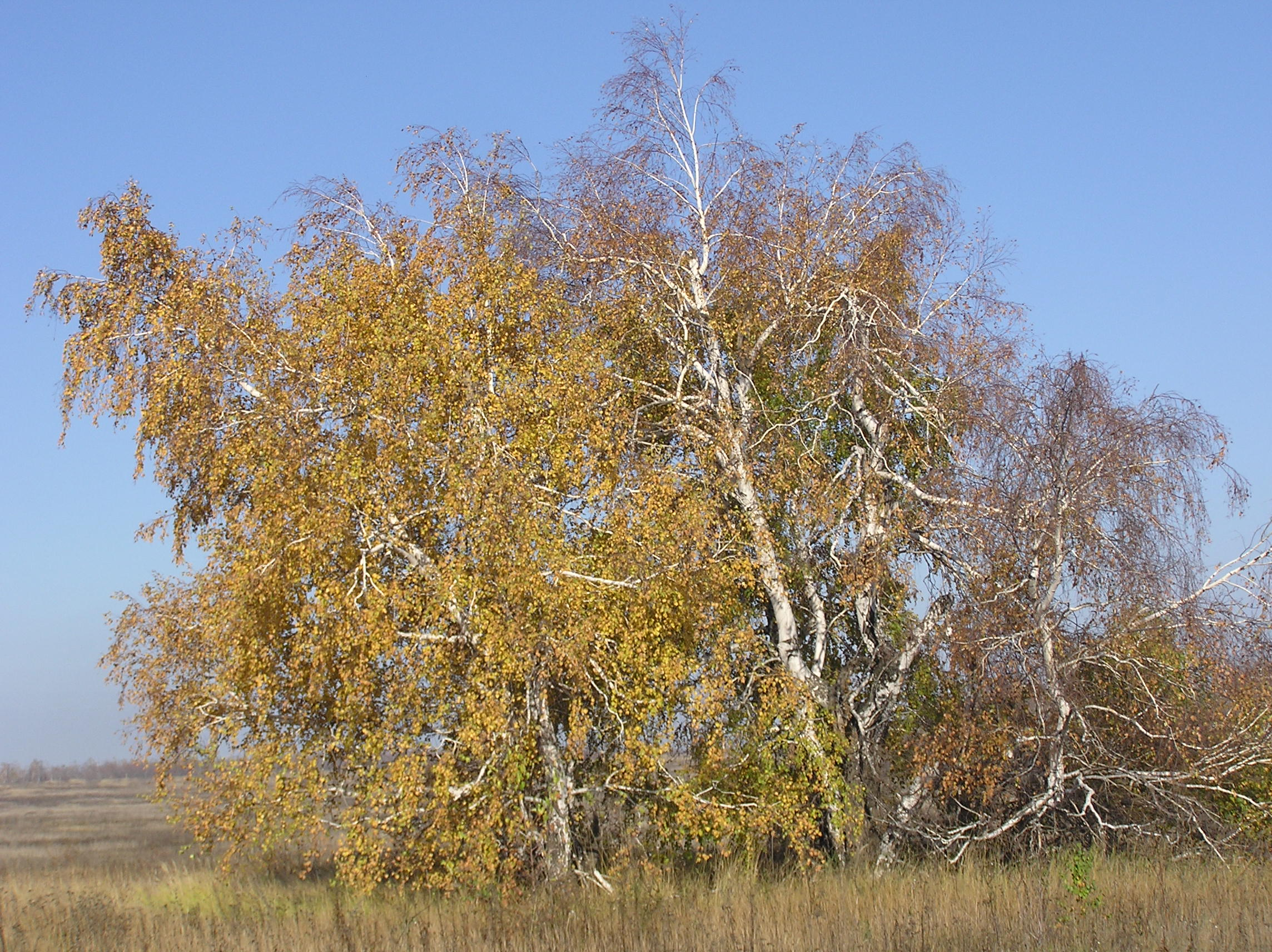
A thicket of silver birch Betula pendula in Saratov Oblast, Russia

A thicket is a very dense stand of trees or tall shrubs, often dominated by only one or a few species to the exclusion of all others. They may be formed by species that shed large numbers of highly viable seeds that are able to germinate in the shelter of the maternal plants.

In some conditions, the formation or spread of thickets may be assisted by human disturbance of an area. Human disturbance and activity within thickets varies based on culture and location.

Where a thicket is formed of briar (also spelled brier), which is a number of unrelated thorny plants, it may be called a briar patch. Plants referred to with the term briar include species in the genera Rosa (rose), Rubus (brambles), and Smilax. A small group of trees is known as a copse.

== Characteristics ==
Thickets are characterized by dense plant life, a low closed canopy, deep shale-derived soil, and high levels of soil carbon and nitrogen. Plants present within a thicket generally reach a maximum of 4 to 6 meters in height. The boundaries between a thicket and its nearby forest are defined by a lack of precipitation and overall dry environment within the thicket area, while forests receive higher levels of precipitation. Forests also do not experience as much herbivory and browsing in comparison to thickets.

The thicket biome has been identified in Africa, Madagascar, Australia, North America, and South America. One of the most studied and well-recognized thickets is the Albany thicket biome, located in the Eastern Cape of South Africa.

Due to their overlapping ranges and similarity of plant species, thicket biomes may be misidentified as being portions of savannas. However, these areas can be differentiated through a thicket's lack of C4 grasses and relatively low fire exposure.

== Significance and use ==
=== Ecological significance ===
While thickets tend to have a small number of plant species present, as they are often dominated by one species of tree or shrub, the biome provides ecological resources to a large group of species. Thickets frequently make up sections of the home ranges of native species, including ptarmigan and hares in the tundra, cheetahs and lions in Africa, and frogs and alligators in North America. In particular, a thicket's high plant density and resulting low visibility allows for predator species to succeed in tracking, stalking, and capturing their prey. Thickets offer protection for bird species, especially during migratory seasons.

=== Societal significance ===
Especially within the Albany thicket biome, thickets have traditionally been used for raising domestic livestock, although the popularity of doing so is declining over time. Recently, the primary human activity taking place in thickets is game hunting, both for recreational purposes and for ecotourism. The increase in game hunting within thickets has also led to the rise of manmade game farms, which has prompted discussion regarding the impact of game farms on the biome and its health. Conservationists and biologists pose concern about the decrease in biodiversity that game farms may create, especially when coupled with other anthropogenic threats to thickets such as land clearing and urbanization. Alternatively, farmers and many locals suggest that the formation of game farms is an effective manner in which to preserve land area and minimize human impact on a thicket.
