= List of environmental film festivals =

Many environmental film festivals present complete programs of films dedicated to environmental subjects on a regular basis, typically annually. Others are committed to presenting environmental films within their subprograms. The festivals listed below solicit and present films about nature, ecology, conservation, wildlife, pollution, habitat loss, climate change and related topics. Some of the festivals listed here are also members of the Green Film Network. This list is not exhaustive.

Name	Est.	City	Country	Description
Changing Climate, Changing Lives (CCCL) Film Festival	2020	Thailand	Thailand	CCCL is Southeast Asia's first film festival focusing on climate change. Launched in 2020, CCCL is a platform for climate storytelling that connects all sectors of society, including filmmakers, youth, communities, scientists, activists, educators, policymakers, and the public, to foster dialogue and inspire action on the climate crisis at both local and global levels.
Garbage Film Festival	2024	Berlin	Germany	The Garbage Film Festival is a special section of the WIPE Film Festival that reflects on the vital subject of garbage, to bring attention to the global challenges on waste, pollution, and the importance of sustainable practices.
UK Green Film Festival	2011	Various	United Kingdom	Taking place in independent cinemas up and down the country, the annual UK Green Film Festival screens some of the very best environmental films from around the world. The festival gives audiences across the UK the chance to discover more about some of the most urgent, debated and misunderstood topics of today, including climate change, energy resources, activism and corporate corruption.
Climate Film Festival	2023	New York City	(United States) US	The Climate Film Festival (CFF) is New York City's first film festival to take a wide-angle lens on climate. CFF is a new cultural organization in NYC with a 3-day, juried festival during Climate Week NYC and year-round programming.
Water Docs Film Festival	2012	Toronto	Canada	Since 2024 films are being screened locally with expert panels and facilitated audience discussion. A long-running juried festival about all things water and climate, the festival has presented Water Warrior Awards, exhibited water-related art, and shared films documenting intensive water projects by middle school classes. Created by environmental and arts charity Ecologos.
EKOFILM	1974	various cities	Czech Republic	EKOFILM is an international film festival about the environment, natural and cultural heritage. It brings a wide range of viewers the latest findings about the condition of nature and the environment in various countries of the world and in many cases facts about dealing with serious issues.
Jackson Wild	1991	Jackson Hole	(United States) US	
Green Film Fest	2009	Buenos Aires	Argentina	The biggest environmental film festival in Argentina takes place each year in Buenos Aires.
Climate Crisis Film Festival	2019	Glasgow, worldwide		The Climate Crisis Film Festival is an annual film festival with an in-person screening in the UK and a digital festival online. Focusing on global voices and the intersectionality of the climate crisis, it aims to bridge the knowledge-action gap in climate action.
ECOFEST	2011	Craiova	Romania	ECOFEST is one of the biggest environmental film festivals in Eastern Europe. It has been itinerated in 2011- Oradea, 2012 - Brăila, 2013 - Băile Felix, 2014 - Piatra Neamț, 2016 - București, 2017 - Suceava, 2018 - București, 2019 - Sinaia, 2021 - Craiova, while the 2015 edition has taken place at the World Expo Milano. It comprises both documentaries and narrative films in competitive and hors-concours sections, as well as workshops, concerts, theater plays and local environmental education campaigns.
London Eco-Film Festival	2013	Shoreditch, London	United Kingdom	
Patagonia Eco Film Fest	2016	Puerto Madryn	Argentina	
Artivist Film Festival & Awards	2004	Hollywood, California	(United States) US	
Ecologico International Film Festival	2008	Lecce	Italy	As of January 2016, this festival has been suspended until further notice.
Environmental Film Festival Australia	2010	Melbourne	Australia	
Environmental Film Festival in the Nation's Capital	1993	Washington, DC	(United States) US	
G2 Green Earth Film Festival	2013	Venice, California	(United States) US	This is an annual environmental film festival that takes place at The G2 Gallery in Venice, California. The festival began in 2013 and screens eco-centered documentaries and narrative films alongside panel discussions and celebratory parties.
GREEN SCREEN Wildlife Film Festival	2007	Eckernförde, Germany	Germany	In the Baltic Sea resort of Eckernförde and neighboring towns in Schleswig-Holstein, around 100 current nature documentaries are shown for five days in September. The festival presents primarily aesthetic nature films, as well as ecologically critical contributions. Green Screen is one of the largest international nature and wildlife film festivals in Germany.
Innsbruck Nature Film Festival	2001	Innsbruck	Austria	The innsbruck nature film festival is an annually held film competition on the topics of nature and environment. The festival was founded in 2001 by the Tyrolian Environmental Ombudsman Johannes Kostenzer and is part of the Green Film Network - an international association of environmental film festivals with the common goal to raise the awareness of environmental topics.
International Wildlife Film Festival	1977	Missoula, Montana	(United States) US	IWFF is the longest running wildlife film festival in the world.
Planet in Focus Environmental Film Festival	1999	Toronto	Canada	Planet in Focus is an incorporated not-for-profit environmental film organization founded in 1999, by Festival Director Mark Haslam.
Princeton Environmental Film Festival	2006	Princeton, New Jersey	(United States) US	Founded in 2006.
San Francisco Green Film Festival	2011	San Francisco, California	(United States) US	The San Francisco Green Film Festival was an environmental film festival which was held annually from 2011 to 2019. The 2020 10th Anniversary Festival was canceled due to the COVID-19 pandemic.
Taos Environmental Film Festival	2015	Taos, New Mexico	(United States) US	Founded in 2015.
All Living Things Environmental Film Festival	2020	Bengaluru	India	All Living Things Environmental Film Festival (ALT EFF) uses a unique decentralised model. In 2024 they screened in over 100 public spaces, 700+ schools, and 70 cities across 18 Indian states, with screenings and events across New York, Ireland, Chile, Nepal, and Costa Rica.
tiNai Ecofilm Festival	2014	Chennai	India	tiNai Ecofilm festival (TEFF) is the biennial ecofilm festival of tiNai (formerly called OSLE-India) – an organisation for promoting ecocriticism in India.
Tigerland India Film Festival	2014	Bhopal, MP	India	Tigerland India Film Festival (TIFF) invites entries under various competitive categories every year. The categories include Best Documentary, Best Short Documentary, Best Short Film, Best Promotional Film on Conservation, Best Wild Click, Best Wild Art, Best Investigative / Research Article, Best Wild Travelogue, Best Poem with Conservation Message, and Best Slogan.
International Kuala Lumpur Eco Film Festival	2008	Kuala Lumpur	Malaysia	The International Kuala Lumpur Eco Film Festival (KLEFF) films may include climate change, ecology, sustainable development and environmental topics. Film topics may overlap with social, economic, spiritual or other themes. Award categories include Best Feature Film/Full length Documentary, Best Short Documentary/TV Documentary, Best Short Film, Best Animation, Best PSA, Special Jury Award, Young Film maker, Special RSPO Award and Special Merit Award which is only for Malaysians.
Wildlife Conservation Film Festival	2010	New York City	(United States) US	Award categories include (but are not limited to) conservation, ecosystem/habitat, endangered species, endangered ecosystem/habitat and wildlife activism.
NatureTrack Film Festival	2018	Los Olivos, California	(United States) US	
Cinémaplanète	2018	Metz	France	The Cinémaplanète Festival is a French film festival in November each year. The first, second and third prices are called Gold, Silver and Bronze Aquabliers. It is organized under the high patronage of the French Ministry for the Ecological and Solidary Transition.
Green Screen Environmental Film Festival	2010	Port of Spain	Trinidad and Tobago	The Green Screen Environmental Film Festival is the only environmental film festival in the English speaking Caribbean.
CMS VATAVARAN Environment and Wildlife International Film Festival and Forum	2001	New Delhi	India	CMS VATAVARAN is a pioneering international film festival and forum on environment and wildlife. Using films as a window to delve into nature, the festival showcases the best of Indian and International films and documentaries.
Portland EcoFilm Festival	2013	Portland, Oregon	(United States) US	The Portland EcoFilm Festival is the premier festival of environmental, Indigenous, and place-based cinema in the USA Pacific Northwest. The mission is to utilize the art of cinema to nurture a more imaginative, collaborative, active, and diverse community of ecologically minded people. Award categories include: The Black Merlin Visionary Film Award; Best Short Film; Best Feature Film; EcoHero Award; and Best Conservation Film.
Colorado Environmental Film Festival	2005	Golden, Colorado	(United States) US	The Colorado Environmental Film Festival is a nonprofit, community-driven event that highlights films exploring the beauty of nature, the urgency of conservation, and the creativity of people working toward solutions. CEFF’s mission is to educate, connect, and inspire through the art of film, empowering everyone to become a part of the environmental story. It bills itself as the largest environmental film festival between the country’s East and West coasts, and its audience has grown from a tiny first-year crowd to around 5,000 over two decades.
