= Wildlife farming =

Raising of traditionally undomesticated animals

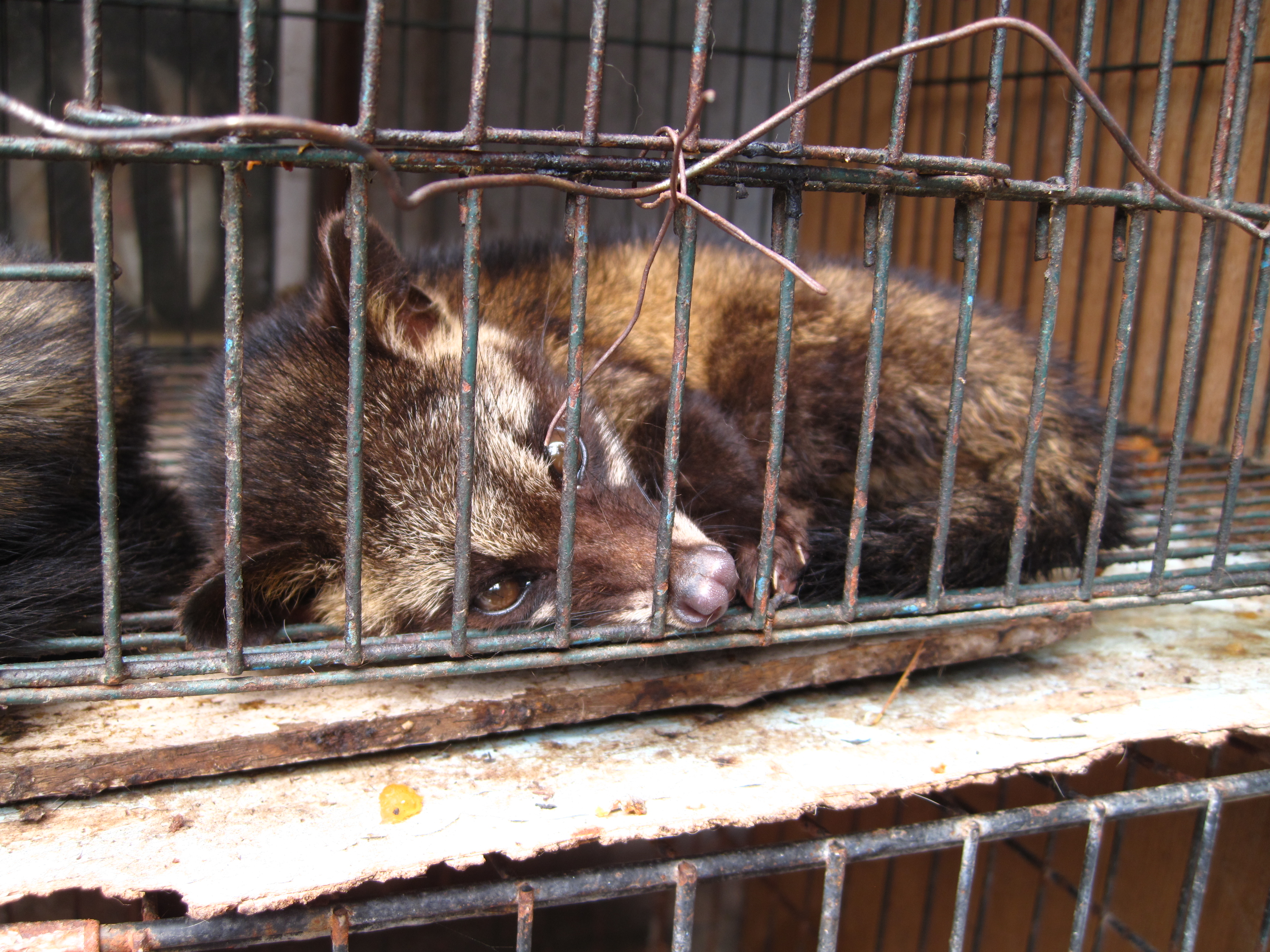
A caged Asian palm civet used for kopi luwak (coffee) production

Wildlife farming refers to the raising of traditionally undomesticated animals in an agricultural setting to produce: living animals for canned hunting and to be kept as pets; commodities such as food and traditional medicine; and materials like leather, fur and fiber.

== Purported benefits ==
Some conservationists argue, wildlife farming can protect endangered species from extinction by reducing the pressure on populations of wild animals which are often poached for food. Others claim that it may be harmful for the majority of conservation efforts, except for a select few species.

Certain African communities rely on bushmeat to obtain their daily amount of animal protein necessary to be healthy and survive. Oftentimes, bushmeat is not handled with care causing the spread of diseases. Wildlife farming can reduce the spread of diseases by providing African communities with bushmeat that is properly processed.

In his documentary film The End of Eden, South African filmmaker Rick Lomba, presented examples of the environmentally sustainable and indeed rejuvenating effect of certain types of wildlife farming.

== Associated risks ==
Wildlife farming has been linked to the emergence of zoonotic diseases, such as the SARs outbreak which has since been connected with the farming of civets.

== Current state of the industry ==
In recent years, South Africa has seen a massive growth in wildlife ranching (also known as game farming), which has led to a range of issues due to a lack of regulation. This has led to the reclassification of 33 wild species as farm animals.

As a result of the COVID-19 pandemic, approximately 20,000 wildlife farms have been shut down in China. In the preceding years, the Chinese government had been promoting and incentivizing the development of the wildlife farming industry, which was valued at 520bn yuan, or £57bn, in 2017.

== See also ==
- Livestock
