= Clouds of Smoke =

Clouds of Smoke may refer to:

- Clouds of Smoke (1959 film), an Argentine film
- Clouds of Smoke (2007 film), a documentary film
