= List of vegetarian and vegan members of the United States Congress =

This page lists all current and former vegetarian and vegan members of the United States Congress. The list may be incomplete.

== Current members ==
Name	Party	Chamber	State	Term		Diet
Name	Party	Chamber	State	Start	Duration	Diet
Cory Booker	Democratic	Senate	New Jersey	October 31, 2013	12 years, 259 days	Booker became a vegan in 2014 and was a vegetarian beforehand. He has cited concern for animals as part of his motivation, in addition to health benefits.
Jamie Raskin	Democratic	House of Representatives	Maryland	January 3, 2017	9 years, 195 days	Raskin became a vegetarian in 2009. He has cited health and environmental motivations.
Adam Schiff	Democratic	Senate	California	December 9, 2024	1 year, 220 days	Schiff is a vegan.

== Former members ==
Name	Party	Chamber	State	Term			Diet
Name	Party	Chamber	State	Start	End	Duration	Diet
Tulsi Gabbard	Democratic (Republican after her time in Congress)	House of Representatives	Hawaii	January 3, 2013	January 3, 2021	8 years, 0 days	Gabbard is vegetarian. Her parents formerly operated a vegetarian restaurant called The Natural Deli. Both her and her family were for a time affiliated with the Science of Identity Foundation of Chris Butler, a vegetarian new religious movement.
Adam Schiff	Democratic	House of Representatives	California	January 3, 2001	December 8, 2024	23 years, 340 days	Schiff is a vegan.
Dennis Kucinich	Democratic	House of Representatives	Ohio	January 3, 1997	January 3, 2013	16 years, 0 days	Kucinich is a vegan. His wife Elizabeth Kucinich is a vegan activist.
Kyrsten Sinema	Democratic, then independent	Senate	Arizona	January 3, 2019	January 3, 2025	6 years, 0 days	As of 2006, Sinema described herself as a vegan.
Kyrsten Sinema	Democratic	House of Representatives	Arizona	January 3, 2013	January 3, 2019	6 years, 0 days	As of 2006, Sinema described herself as a vegan.
Betty Sutton	Democratic	House of Representatives	Ohio	January 3, 2007	January 3, 2013	6 years, 0 days	Sutton is a vegetarian who has introduced measures related to animal welfare.
Al Gore	Democratic	Senate	Tennessee	January 3, 1985	January 2, 1993	7 years, 365 days	Gore became vegan after his time in Congress for environmental reasons.
Al Gore	Democratic	House of Representatives	Tennessee	January 3, 1977	January 3, 1985	8 years, 0 days	Gore became vegan after his time in Congress for environmental reasons.
Horace Greeley	Whig	House of Representatives	New York	December 4, 1848	March 3, 1849	89 days	Greeley was an adherent of Sylvester Graham's dietary philosophy and likely was a vegetarian or engaged in reduced meat consumption for a significant portion of his life.

== Other ==
Brad Lander, who is running for New York's 10th congressional district in 2026, is a pescatarian. Other notable American politicians who have not served in Congress, such as Eric Adams, have also publicly spoken about their plant-based diets. Ben Carson has practiced a flexitarian/reducetarian diet in line with his Seventh-day Adventist faith. Bill Clinton was temporarily a vegan for health reasons. Similarly, Alexandria Ocasio-Cortez went vegetarian for Lent, but is not believed to still be one. Of the Founding Fathers, Benjamin Franklin avoided meat to at least some extent. Second Lady Usha Vance is also a vegetarian.
