= List of films about renewable energy =

This is a list of films about renewable and alternative energy.

- Carbon Nation
- Catching the Sun
- The Fourth Revolution: Energy
- Fuel
- Gashole
- Gasland
- Generation on the Wind
- Go Further
- An Inconvenient Truth
- Lovins on the Soft Path
- Planet of the Humans
- Powerful: Energy for Everyone
- Race the Sun
- Switch Energy Project
- Wind Over Water
- Windfall

== See also ==
- List of books about renewable energy
