= Carl-A. Fechner =

German journalist, director and producer

Carl-A Fechner
- Born: 1953 (age 72–73); Gütersloh, Westphalia, Germany
- Occupations: Journalist, film-maker, film producer
- Known for: Documentaries about sustainable energy
- Awards: Deauville Green Award (2016)
- Website: fechnermedia.com

Carl-A Fechner is a German journalist, film-maker and film producer, known for documentaries about Germany's Energiewende and sustainable energy more generally.

== Life ==
Fechner took a degree in media education, graduating in 1980 with a diploma. During the First Gulf War, he served as a correspondent for ARD. Since 1988 he has been managing partner of fechnerMEDIA GmbH (formerly focus–film GmbH). His attention since then is the production of documentaries on sustainability. As editorial director, Fechner is responsible for content and artistic design of fechnerMEDIA films and media campaigns.

After producing TV documentaries, Fechner produced and directed his first cinema documentary in 2010 called The Fourth Revolution: Energy.

In 2016, his second cinema documentary, Power to Change: The Energy Rebellion was released, focusing on the energy transition in Germany.

== Personal life ==
Fechner lives with his wife Bettina and their two children in Baden-Württemberg, Germany.

== Filmography ==
Year	English title	German title	Notes
2005	Oceanic Power	Stromquelle Meer — Die Energie der Zukunft?	Documentary; directors: Johanes Bunger, Carl-A. Fechner, ZDF/arte
2005	Treasure Hunt In Asia - The Mystery of a Forgotten Kingdom	Schatzsuche in Asian – Das alte Goldland Srivijaya	Documentary, director: Tamara Spitzing, SWR/arte
2007	Love, Sex and Moped		Documentary, directors: Christian Le long, Sylvia Bazzoli, 2007
2007	Wangari Mathaii – Mother of the Trees	Wangari Mathaii - Mutter der Bäume	Documentary, directors: Alan Dater, Lisa Merton
2008	On a Knife Edge	Auf Messers Schneide	Documentary, directors: Alan Dater, Lisa Merton
2010	The Fourth Revolution: Energy	Die 4.Revolution Energy Autonomy	Documentary
2011	Nuclear Waste In My Backyard	Atommüll in meienem Garten	Documentary, director: Irja von Bernstorff
2012	When You've Gone I'll Still Be Here!	Weil ich langer lebe als du	Documentary,
2013	Future of the Cities	Wie wired die Stadt satt?	Documentary, director: Irja von Bernstorff
2016	The Farmer and I	The Farmer	Documentary, director: Irja von Bernstorff
2016	Power to Change: The Energy Rebellion	Power to Change – Die EnergieRebellion	Documentary, released with English subtitles
2018	Climate Warriors	-	Documentary, filming began in April 2017

== See also ==
- List of environmental films
- List of German films of the 2010s
