= Climate Refugees =

- Theatrical release poster
- Directed by: Michael P. Nash
- Written by: Michael P. Nash
- Produced by: Justin Hogan; Nicole Boxer; Michael P. Nash
- Edited by: Nancy Frazen; Brett Langefels; Michael P. Nash; Katina Zinner
- Music by: Michael Mollura
- Production companies: LA Think Tank; Beverly Hills Productions
- Distributed by: Netflix (2013)
- Release date: January 29, 2010 (Sundance Film Festival)
- Running time: 89 minutes
- Country: United States
- Language: English
- Budget: $1.6 million

Climate Refugees is a 2010 American documentary film, directed and produced by Michael P. Nash. The documentary attempts to cover the human impact of climate change by considering those who could most be affected by it.

== Content ==
With contributions from several politicians, scientists, and environmental activists, including Senator John Kerry, House Speaker Newt Gingrich, Vice President Al Gore, and Nobel Prize winner Wangari Maathai, the film documents the human plight of climate change with a focus on the intersection of over population and climatic change. Filmmaker Michael P. Nash and producing partner Justin Hogan traveled to 48 countries to document people affected by climate change and to present climate migration through personal stories as well as political and scientific commentary.

The film also connects climate-related displacement to larger political concerns, especially food shortages, water scarcity, drought, population growth, and national security. It argues that climate change is not only an environmental issue, but also a human and political issue because it can force people to leave their homes when land, food, and water become harder to access. Scholarly discussions of climate change documentaries have also noted that films such as Climate Refugees try to make global warming visible by focusing on human stories rather than only scientific data.

== Interviewees ==
- Lester Brown
- Wangari Maathai
- Yvo de Boer
- Dr. Paul R. Ehrlich
- Newt Gingrich
- John Kerry
- Bert Metz
- Barack Obama
- Nancy Pelosi
- Gov. Bill Ritter
- Ken Salazar
- Stephen Schneider
- Achim Steiner
- Desmond Tutu
- Al Gore (archive footage)

== Release ==
Its world premiere was 29 January 2010 at the 2010 Sundance Film Festival and it was released on August 17, 2011. The film had a small theatrical release, and distributed by Netflix, iTunes and Amazon. It was particularly marketed through screening events, having been screened at the Senate and House, The Pentagon, The Vatican, and foundations including the United Nations COP15 climate summit in December 2009 in Copenhagen. Many screenings and discussion events for the film were held at universities. Reviews of the film focused on its urgency and its attempt to make climate change feel more personal by showing the people most affected by it. Justin Lowe of The Hollywood Reporter described the documentary as ambitious in scope, while also noting that its wide range of examples sometimes made the film feel broad rather than focused. John Anderson of Variety similarly emphasized the film’s emotional and political urgency.

== Reception ==
Robert Redford described it in The New York Times as "a resounding wake-up call for every human being." The documentary went on to play in over 100 festivals around the world winning multiple awards.
