= Black Hole (2015 film) =

- Directed by: João Dujon Pereira
- Written by: João Dujon Pereira
- Produced by: João Dujon Pereira
- Cinematography: João Dujon Pereira
- Edited by: João Dujon Pereira
- Distributed by: Independent
- Release date: 3 September 2015 (EFFA)
- Running time: 104 mins
- Country: Australia
- Language: English
- Budget: A$90,000 (est)

Black Hole is a feature-length documentary film about the blockade opposing the expansion of Whitehaven Coal's Maules Creek coal mine in the Leard State Forest, New South Wales. It was directed and produced by Joao Dujon Pereira and premiered on 3 September 2015 at the Environmental Film Festival Australia in Melbourne. Interview subjects appearing in the film include Jonathan Moylan, an environmental activist responsible for the production and distribution of a fraudulent press release regarding the ANZ Bank's financial relationship with the coal mine in 2013.

== Premiere ==
The film premiered at the Environmental Film Festival Australia in Melbourne on 3 September 2015, after which the director spoke. A Canberra screening followed on 11 September 2015. Following EFFA, the film embarked on a limited release tour of Australian towns and cities in late 2015, with further screenings scheduled for 2016. By January 2016, the film had screened in Queensland, New South Wales, Victoria, the Australian Capital Territory, Northern Territory, Tasmania, South Australia and Western Australia.

== Reception ==
The film was commended by former Australian Greens party leader Bob Brown, and was warmly received by participants in the blockade and Australian audience members, many of which helped facilitate screenings in their own towns.

== Production ==
Pereira commenced production on Black Hole in approximately April 2014, after being encouraged to visit the blockade at the Leard State Forest by a housemate. He initially intended to make a short documentary, but then changed his plans to expand the project to feature length. Dujon shot over 700 hours of footage and over fifty interviews and described the undertaking as "a big risk financially and emotionally." Pereira told New Mathilda that he "quickly" raised $20,000 via crowd-funding. The film was funded in part by donations made through campaigns on Chuffed ($17,261), the Documentary Australia Foundation ($1,430) and via additional direct PayPal donations. The film's production budget was an estimated $90,000. The film was in production and post-production for a total of 16 months. In September 2014, Pereira told the Namoi Valley Independent that he intended to release the film in January 2015. He said of his approach to the production:

"I want to capture the community’s opinions of both the positives and negatives of mining in the area and create a balanced piece.”

== Director ==
Joao Dujon Pereira is a first generation Australian and lives in the Victorian capital city of Melbourne.
