= Pig Feast: Colonialism in Our Time =

- Directed by: Dandhy Laksono; Cypri Paju Dale
- Produced by: Dandhy Laksono; Victor Mambor
- Production company: Watchdoc
- Release date: 7 March 2026 (Auckland, New Zealand)
- Running time: 95 minutes
- Country: Indonesia
- Language: Indonesian

Pig Feast: Colonialism in Our Time (Indonesian: Pesta Babi: Kolonialisme di Zaman Kita) is an investigative documentary film directed through an intergenerational collaboration between Dandhy Dwi Laksono (director of Sexy Killers and Dirty Vote) and Cypri Paju Dale, an anthropologist and researcher on Papuan issues. The 95-minute film was produced through a collaboration among various organizations, including Watchdoc, Ekspedisi Indonesia Baru, Yayasan Bentala Pusaka, Jubi.id, Greenpeace Indonesia, and Legal Aid Institute of Papua Merauke. The film premiered in Auckland, New Zealand, on 7 March 2026.

== Synopsis ==
The film highlights the bitter struggle of Indigenous communities in the South Papua region—particularly the Marind, Yei, Awyu, and Muyu peoples—whose living spaces are threatened by large-scale land exploitation.

The story begins with a screening of the pig feast ceremony (Atatbon), a traditional ritual of the Muyu people and surrounding communities in South Papua, illustrating the close spiritual and social relationship between humans, nature, and their ancestors. However, that peace changes drastically when large ships begin docking in their villages, unloading hundreds of excavators, heavy machinery, and military escorts into their communities.

The arrival of these industries is part of the implementation of the government’s National Strategic Projects (PSN), which involve clearing millions of hectares of customary forests for food security, sugarcane, palm oil, biodiesel, and bioethanol projects. Through the perspectives of local figures such as Yasinta Moiwend from the Marind Anim, viewers are invited to witness how customary forests are gradually stripped away and transformed into heavily guarded industrial zones.

=== Conflict and Symbol of Resistance ===
The film sharply captures the social, legal, and physical clashes on the ground. The resistance of Indigenous communities is portrayed emotionally through various symbolic acts:

- Red Cross Movement: The Awyu community in Boven Digoel rejects land grabbing by placing customary barriers and red cross symbols on trees in their forest. This movement then spreads to the banks of the Digul River as their last line of defense.
- Military Boundary Stakes: On the other hand, Vincent Kwipalo of the Yei discovers a harsh reality when his customary land is unilaterally marked with stakes bearing the inscription “Land Owned by the Indonesian Army”.

In addition to depicting clashes on the ground, this investigative documentary presents a data-driven exploration of business affiliations and the key actors behind the corporate conglomerates that receive the greatest benefits from the exploitation of land in Papua.

== Release ==
On April 25, 2026, a screening of the film at the Pendopo of the Pastoral Student Center in the Special Region of Yogyakarta was canceled by the Yogyakarta Pastoral Center. On May 8, 2026, a public screening of the film at the State Islamic University of Mataram was halted after just three minutes. Meanwhile, opposition to the film’s screening was also expressed by the South Kalimantan National Committee of Indonesian Youth (KNPI). Despite this opposition, the film was shown at more than 1,800 independently organized community screenings across Indonesia and abroad between March and May 2026. Following its official release on YouTube via the JubiTV channel on May 22, 2026, it had been viewed more than 13 million times within two weeks.
