= Wolf Ackva =

German actor (1911–2000)

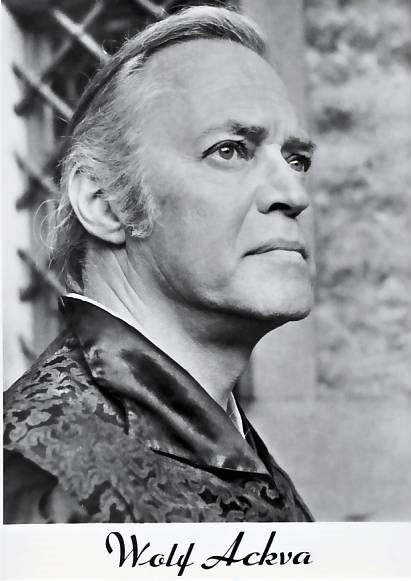
- Actor's autographed photo
- Born: 30 July 1911; Montigny, Germany (now Montigny-lès-Metz, France)
- Died: 16 January 2000 (aged 88); Fahrenzhausen, Germany
- Occupation: Actor
- Years active: 1935–1996

Wolf Ackva (30 July 1911 – 16 January 2000) was a German actor. He appeared in more than 70 films and television shows between 1935 and 1996.

Ackva was born in the Lorraine section of north-eastern France in 1911. After abandoning medical studies begun in Leipzig in 1931, he took acting lessons from Otto Falckenberg, made his debut in Düsseldorf, and subsequently performed on numerous stages in Munich. Although he had appeared in a supporting role as early as 1936, he only became widely known to the public as a film actor through his role as Chief Inspector Steiner—alongside Beppo Brem—in the crime series "Die seltsamen Methoden des Franz Josef Wanninger" (The Strange Methods of Inspector Franz Josef Wanninger) produced by Bavaria Film. The series aired on ARD between 1965 and 1970 and again between 1978 and 1982. He also worked as a director and voice actor, including on the James Bond films "The Spy Who Loved Me" (1977), "Moonraker" (1979), "Octopussy" (1983), "A View to a Kill" (1985), "The Living Daylights" (1987), and "Licence to Kill" (1989).

Films include: "Schwarze Rosen" (1935), "Banditen der Autobahn" (1955), "Ludwig 1881" (1993).

Ackva died on January 16, 2000, at the age of 88, following a long and severe illness. His grave is located in the cemetery in the Viehbach district of the municipality of Fahrenzhausen, in the district of Freising, Bavaria, Germany.

== Selected filmography ==
| Year | Title | Role |
|---|---|---|
| 1935 | If It Were Not for Music (Wenn die Musik nicht wär) | |
| 1936 | Lucky Kids (Glückskinder) | Sekretär bei Jackson |
| 1939 | Hurrah! I'm a Father (Hurra, ich bin Papa) | Freund von Peter |
| 1952 | Nights on the Road (Nachts auf den Straßen) | Klatte |
| 1958 | The Green Devils of Monte Cassino (Die grünen Teufel von Monte Cassino) | |
| 1967 | The Last Paradises: On the Track of Rare Animals | Narrator |
| 1975 | Earthquake in Chile (Das Erdbeben in Chili) | Don Henrico Asteron (Voice) |
