= Maules Creek coal mine =

Open cut coal mine in New South Wales

The Maules Creek coal mine is a large open-cut black coal mine owned and operated by Whitehaven Coal, located in the Gunnedah Basin, near Boggabri in New South Wales, Australia. It has planning approval to extract up to 13 million tonnes of coal each year until 2034. The mine has been mired by political corruption and years of community legal action and direct action against the destruction of the Leard State Forest - in which the mine is situated - farmland, destruction of Gamilaray cultural sites and health impacts on surrounding communities. Whitehaven Coal have a 75% shareholding, Itochu 15% and J Power 10%.

== Resource ==
The deposit contains 362 million tonnes of recoverable resources and is considered by its owners, Whitehaven Coal to be a Tier 1 resource. The mine is 16 km from a rail line which connects the project to the Port of Newcastle. The mine was fully approved in July 2013, and first sales of coal occurred on 9 January 2015. As of 2015, the mine's owners expect Maules Creek to have an operating life of over 30 years.

== Opposition ==
The mine has been continuously opposed by the Gamilaray people, surrounding landholders, towns, community groups, environment groups. A community blockade against the mine - the longest running of its type in Australia's history - has maintained a presence against the mine for several years. In 2013, Jonathan Moylan produced a fake press release which adversely affected Whitehaven's stock price.

Current opposition consists of continued legal action and direct action specifically targeted against forest clearing which occurs in February–March each year. Over 350 people have been arrested as part of broader campaigns against coal mining in the area, including a number of celebrities such as former Australian rugby team captain David Pocock who locked on to mining equipment in 2014.

The blockade at Maules Creek became the subject of a documentary film by Joao Dujon Pereira entitled Black Hole. The film premiered in Melbourne on 3 September 2015.
