= Before Vanishing =

- Directed by: Joude Gorani
- Narrated by: Joude Gorani
- Release date: 2005
- Running time: 14 minutes
- Country: Syria
- Language: French

Before Vanishing is a French-language Syrian documentary film directed by Joude Gorani.

== Synopsis ==
The director of the film sets out for a journey from the beginning to the end of the Barada river and discovers a number of facts, like unplanned urbanization and pollution.

== Production ==
The documentary is directed by Joude Gorani as her graduation project.
