= Renewal (film) =

- DVD Cover
- Directed by: Marty Ostrow, Terry Kay Rockefeller
- Produced by: Marty Ostrow, Terry Kay Rockefeller
- Release date: 2008
- Running time: 90 minutes
- Country: United States
- Language: English

Renewal is a 2008 feature-length documentary film about religious-environmental activists. Directed and produced by American filmmakers Marty Ostrow and Terry Kay Rockefeller, the film includes eight stories that represent the growing religious-environmental movement. Each story is set in a different religious-tradition, addressing a different environmental concern. Renewal began airing on public television stations in the United States in April 2009.

== Stories ==
The eight stories in Renewal are:

- A Crime Against Creation: Evangelicals bear witness to mountaintop removal mining and the destruction of Appalachia (11:20 min.)
- Going Green: GreenFaith in New Jersey helps congregations take the first steps to environmental action (14:20 min)
- Food for Faith: Muslim tradition and charity forge bonds between urban communities and sustainable farms in Illinois (14:50 min)
- Ancient Roots: The Teva Learning Center and Adamah in Connecticut bring environmental education together with Jewish tradition (17:30 min)
- Compassion in Action: Green Sangha, a Buddhist community in northern California, leads a campaign to save trees (11:10 min)
- Eco-Justice: The Holy Spirit inspires a battle against industrial contamination in small-town Mississippi (11:30 min)
- Sacred Celebration: Catholics and Native Americans embrace religious ritual in a struggle to protect New Mexico’s land and water (9:30 min)
- Interfaith Power and Light: Across America people of all faiths mount a religious response to global warming (9:25 min)

== Presentation history ==
- In honor of World Environment Day 2008, Renewal was screened at the United Nations.
- Renewal is featured in Humane Society of the United States’ “All Creatures Great and Small Campaign.”
- Voted “Best of Fest” at the Hazel Wolf Environmental Film Festival in Seattle.
- Screened by over 1000 Interfaith Power and Light-affiliated congregations, in 29 states.
- Showcased as a workshop at Bioneers by the Bay, a conference dedicated to visionary and practical solutions for restoring the Earth and its inhabitants.
- An official selection of the Wild and Scenic Environmental Film Festival and National Tour, the largest environmental film festival in the United States, a festival for activists by activists.

== DVD release ==
The Renewal DVD includes the 90-minute sequence of the eight stories, as well as uncut stand-alone versions of the stories. It is being promoted as a flexible tool for community action groups, congregations, religious and environmental organizations.

== See also ==
- Religion and environmentalism
- Spiritual ecology
- Yale Forum on Religion and Ecology
