= Joude Gorani =

Syrian Cinematographer (born 1980)

Joude Gorani (born 1980) is a Syrian cinematographer. She graduated from La Femis (French state film school) in 2005. She has since worked in documentaries such as Dolls - A Woman from Damascus directed by Diana El Jeiroudi, premiered at IDFA and Visions du réel documentary film festival in Nyon, Switzerland, Black Stone directed by Nidal Dibs and Black Lines directed by Danish filmmaker Camilla Magid. Her graduation film was Before Vanishing about the decline of Damascus' Barada river. In fiction, Joude Gorani worked on a few shorts before she filmed feature films by Nidal Dibs, Maher Kaddo and Joud Said.

Gorani was a selector for DOX BOX, the international documentary film festival in Syria.
