= Eugen Schuhmacher =

German zoologist and documentary filmmaker

- Born: Eugen Josef Robert Schuhmacher; 4 August 1906; Stuttgart, Germany
- Died: 8 January 1973 (aged 66); Munich, Germany
- Years active: 1933–1973

Eugen Schuhmacher (actually Eugen Josef Robert Schuhmacher) (4 August 1906 – 8 January 1973) was a German zoologist and pioneer of animal documentaries. Besides Bernhard Grzimek and Heinz Sielmann he belonged to the German wildlife documentary filmmakers with an international reputation.

== Biography ==
Eugen Schuhmacher was born in Stuttgart, Germany. His career began in the early 1930s with educational and cultural shortfilms about the wildlife in South America and the German Reich. In the next four decades he made documentaries (feature length and shortfilms) about animals, the Inca culture, and the indigenous people from North America, South America and Papua New Guinea. These movies were awarded at festivals in Berlin, Venice and in Cannes. His movie Natur in Gefahr (Nature in Danger) from 1952 is an alerting report of the destruction of the nature paradises and the extinction of species. His feature film In the Shadow of the Karakoram (Im Schatten des Karakorum) received the German Film Prize for best documentary in 1955. In 1958 he discovered the German television for his work and he made one of the first German television series about endangered species. 37 episodes of On the Track of rare Animals (Auf den Spuren seltener Tiere) were shot, a series which has taken the audience on a journey to Galapagos, Papua New Guinea, Africa, and other exotic places. This series was very popular in German television. In 1966 he finished his movie project The Last Paradises: On the Track of Rare Animals, a film which had taken seven years to make. It was awarded at the Mountain Film Festival at Trento in 1967. Schuhmacher has died at age 66 of cancer in Munich, Germany. His last movie Europas Paradiese (Europe's paradises) had its premiere after his death.

He was awarded the Royal Geographical Society's Cherry Kearton Medal and Award in 1971.

== Selected movies ==
- 1955: Im Schatten des Karakorum
- 1967: The Last Paradises: On the Track of Rare Animals (Die letzten Paradiese)
- 1973: Europas Paradiese

== Selected books ==
- 1968: The Last of the Wild: On the track of Rare animals (with Gwynne Vevers; Winwood Reade), Collins, London, 1968
- 1968: The Last Paradises: On the track of Rare animals, DOUBLEDAY & CO, INC. New York
- 1970: Alaska: Vast Land on the Edge of the Arctic (with Heinrich Gohl), Kümmerly & Frey Geographical Publishers, Berne, Switzerland
