= Fight for the Planet =

- Directed by: Colin Carter
- Music by: Monique Barry; Alex Mine; The Soles
- Production company: Statik Motion Pictures
- Release date: March 12, 2009
- Running time: 64 minutes
- Country: Canada
- Language: English

Fight for the Planet is a 2009 Canadian film. Directed, produced, and edited by Colin Carter, Fight for the Planet is a call to action film about global warming, and the future of our society as it steps into a new environmentally conscious era. Fight for the Planet was 16-year-old director Colin Carter's first feature film, and is the first in a row of award-winning features (Please Kill Mr. Know It All (2012) and Blueprints (2013)). The film went on the tour the international film festival circuit in the summer of 2010, and later was distributed for curricular use in Ontario high schools. A page about the film and the Director is published in the current Ontario grade 10 science textbook.

== Plot ==
Fight for the Planet is documentary about the geological, social and economical impacts of global warming. The film stresses the need for a change in politics—but also in behavior. It investigates both the science behind climate change, and technologies that will bring us into the new "green" future. Among those interviewed include politicians such as Stéphane Dion and Jack Layton, professors, journalists, field experts, and green technology companies.
