= The Truth About Wildlife =

- Genre: Wildlife
- Presented by: Chris Packham
- Country of origin: England
- Original language: English
- No. of seasons: 1
- No. of episodes: 3

Production
- Executive producer: Simon Willis
- Running time: 30 minutes
- Production company: BBC

Original release
- Network: BBC One South; BBC One South West; BBC One West
- Release: 30 May – 13 June 2011

The Truth About Wildlife is the name of a regional wildlife programme originally broadcast on BBC One South, including the Oxford opt out service, BBC One South West, including the Channel Islands opt out service, and BBC One West between 30 May and 13 June 2011. Following the success of the programme, it was later repeated on BBC Two so the remainder of the regions could view it.

== Episodes ==
The series is based around the views of naturalist Chris Packham as he presents his take on what's going wrong and right with Britain's wildlife and conservation techniques.

1. Farming – An investigation into the state of wildlife on farms and if species are in decline. This includes following a farmer who is giving up on government nature schemes to make more money from cash crops and those committed to wildlife friendly farming.
2. Coast – Chris travels to Lundy to see how a no-take zone there has benefited undersea creatures and to Lyme Bay to see the impact of a scallop dredging ban. He also investigates both sides of an argument over a proposed new marine conservation zone that may help to protect wildlife in the future.
3. Episode 3 – In the final episode, Chris investigates Woodland and Heath species. He looks at non-native conifer plantations that do little to aid native wildlife and iconic places like the New Forest and Dartmoor that are suffering loss of habitat. He also asks whether we are spending too much on species like dormice and whether we should concentrate instead on connecting up important habitats like heathland that has been fragmented over the years.

== See also ==
- BBC South
- BBC South West
- BBC West
