= Bert Metz =

Dutch climate policy expert (born 1945)

Bert Metz (born 15 August 1945) is a Dutch climate policy expert. He was co-chair of Intergovernmental Panel on Climate Change (IPCC) Working Group III on mitigation on climate change for the third and fourth assessment report of the IPCC. Currently, he is a fellow at the European Climate Foundation.

== Biography ==
Metz was born in The Hague. He obtained an engineer's degree in chemical engineering at Delft University of Technology and subsequently his Ph.D. degree at the same university. From 1976 to 1987, he worked for Dutch Ministry of Housing, Spatial Planning and Environment in the fields of air pollution, external safety, noise pollution, chemical waste and the enforcement of environmental laws.

From 1987 until 1992, he was Counsellor for Health and Environment at the Royal Netherlands Embassy in Washington DC. In 1992 he became deputy director for Air and Energy of the Netherlands Ministry of Housing, Spatial Planning and Environment, with responsibility for climate policy. He led the Netherlands delegation to the negotiations on the Kyoto Protocol to the Climate Convention.

In 1997, he moved to the Netherlands Environmental Assessment Agency at RIVM to head the group on climate change and global sustainability and was elected as co-chairman of the Working Group on Climate Change Mitigation of the IPCC for the preparation of the Third Assessment Report. In 2002 he was re-elected in that position for the 4th Assessment Report cycle. Although formally retired, Bert Metz is still very active in the climate policy arena, among others as advisor for the European Climate Foundation and as steering group member of UNEP's annual Emissions Gap Report. In 2008 he was named Officer in the Order of Orange-Nassau..
