= Gaia's Toys =

1995 novel by Rebecca Ore

- Author: Rebecca Ore
- Language: English
- Genre: Science fiction
- Publisher: Tom Doherty Associates, Inc.
- Publication date: 1995
- Media type: Print
- Pages: 317
- ISBN: 0-312-85781-0
- OCLC: 32311342
- Dewey Decimal: 813/.54 20
- LC Class: PS3565.R385 G3 1995

Gaia's Toys is a science fiction adventure by Rebecca Ore. The story is set in the near future when gene-hacking, medical nanotechnology, and environmental damage are commonplace. The lives of several of society's misfits intertwine in accelerating action. The title is ironic because humans play with earth's creatures as if they were toys while the modified creatures, in turn, shape us.

== Plot summary ==
Willie Hunsucker is a veteran on the dole, taking a monthly trip to Roanoke so the government can use his brain power for whatever purposes it deems appropriate. Willie is starting to remember bits and pieces of this time. He has an unusually large praying mantis that soothes him when he flashes back to his war service. He doesn't know it but the mantis's pheromes are increasing his memories and his initiative.

Dorcas Rae is a gene technician and mistress to the lab supervisor. On the sly, she created the mantises that have become so popular with people on the dole. The government wants to find who did this. She has also created a wasp that will sting when it senses aggressiveness in people.

Allison is an eco-terrorist. She delivers a car to an oil refinery but her contact doesn't arrive. Just after she's captured by government agents, the car explodes a nuclear device that damages much of the oil refining capacity of the southern U.S. She agrees to cooperate and become an undercover agent—donating brain time to help with Dorca's research.

After Willie's house is robbed, he falls in with a group of people who've each suffered from environmental or nanotechnological damage. As a result of an assignment he'd had while on the dole, they become aware of Allison and Dorcas and determine to rescue Dorcas from the government net that's about to close around her. The chase is on. In a world where nanotechnology can alter one's appearance in a few hours and brain images can be tracked if one uses the net to ask for any information, the chase is an intriguing combination of high and low tech.
