= Marina Endicott =

Canadian writer

Marina Endicott (born September 14, 1958) is a Canadian novelist and short story writer. Her novel Good to a Fault won the 2009 Commonwealth Writers' Prize for Canada and the Caribbean. It was a finalist for the Giller Prize and was longlisted for the Dublin IMPAC award. Her next, The Little Shadows, was longlisted for the Giller Prize and shortlisted for the Governor General's Literary Award. Close to Hugh was longlisted for the Giller Prize and named one of CBC's Best Books of 2015. The Difference won the City of Edmonton Robert Kroetsch Prize. It was published in the US by W. W. Norton as The Voyage of the Morning Light in June 2020. Her latest book, The Observer, won the City of Saskatoon Book Prize and the Saskatchewan Book of the Year Award in 2023. Endicott received the 2026 Prairie Grindstone Prize for her body of work.

== Personal life ==
Endicott was born in Golden, British Columbia in 1958, the daughter of an Anglican priest; she grew up in Vancouver, Halifax and Yarmouth, Nova Scotia, and Toronto, Ontario. She worked as an actor before moving to London, England, where she began to write fiction. Returning to Canada in 1984, she went west to Saskatoon and worked in theatre as a director and dramaturge. She was for many years the dramaturge of the Saskatchewan Playwrights Centre. In 1992 she went farther west with husband Peter Ormshaw to Mayerthorpe, Alberta, on his first posting with the RCMP; they have since lived in Cochrane, Edmonton, and Saskatoon. They have two children: Willow (1993) and Rachel (1996). They presently (2021) live in Saskatoon.

== Writing career ==
Endicott was an actor, director, and dramaturge before beginning a second career as a writer of fiction. When asked why she switched, she explained:

Being an actor isn't an easy life. The work is so ephemeral... I write novels instead of plays because I like the intimate link of the silent writer and the silent reader.

Endicott's first short story appeared in Grain in 1985. Her stories have been anthologized in Coming Attractions and shortlisted for the 1993 Journey Prize. Her first novel, Open Arms (2001), was a finalist for the Amazon.ca First Novel Award and was broadcast on CBC Radio's Between the Covers in 2003. Good to a Fault was selected for the 2010 edition of CBC Radio's Canada Reads. Her long poem about the Mayerthorpe incident, "The Policeman's Wife, Some Letters", was shortlisted for the CBC Literary Awards in 2006.

Her third novel, The Little Shadows, published by Doubleday in 2011, was longlisted for the Giller Prize and shortlisted for the Governor General's Award for Fiction.

She co-wrote the screenplay for the 2012 documentary film, Vanishing Point.

Close to Hugh was published in May 2015, and was also longlisted for the Scotiabank Giller Prize.

Her 2019 novel, The Difference, Knopf Canada, won the Robert Kroetsch City of Edmonton Book Prize and the Dartmouth Fiction Award, and was one of the Globe & Mail's Best Books of 2019. It was published by W.W. Norton in the US as The Voyage of the Morning Light in June 2020.

In 2023 Endicott's novel The Observer, Knopf Canada, won the Saskatoon City Book Prize and the Saskatchewan Book of the Year award. Although fiction, it pulls deeply from Endicott's own experiences in Mayerthorpe, Alberta, her husband's first posting with the RCMP; it was written many years after her poems on the same subject.

== Prize and honours ==
- 1993 Shortlist, Journey Prize
- 2002 Finalist, Amazon.ca First Novel Award (for Open Arms)
- 2008 Shortlisted, Giller Prize (for Good to a Fault)
- 2009 Commonwealth Writers' Prize for Best Book, Canada and the Caribbean (for Good to a Fault)
- 2010 Longlisted, International Dublin Literary Award
- 2011 Longlisted, Giller Prize (for The Little Shadows)
- 2011 Finalist, Governor General's Award for English-language fiction, Canada (for The Little Shadows)
- 2015 Longlisted, Giller Prize (for Close to Hugh)
- 2020 Robert Kroetsch City of Edmonton Book Prize (for The Difference)
- 2020 City of Dartmouth Fiction Prize (for The Difference)
- 2024 Saskatchewan Book of the Year Award
- 2024 City of Saskatoon Book Prize
- 2026 Prairie Grindstone Prize

== Bibliography ==
- —— (2001). Open Arms. Douglas & McIntyre. ISBN 9781551119328.
- —— (2008). Good to a Fault. Freehand Books. ISBN 9781551119991.
- —— (2009). Open Arms. Freehand Books. ISBN 9781551119328.
- —— (2011). New Year's Eve. GoodReads/HarperCollins. ISBN 9781926583334.
- —— (2011). The Little Shadows. Doubleday Canada. ISBN 9780385668910.
- —— (2015). Close to Hugh. Doubleday Canada. ISBN 9780385678605.
- —— (2019). The Difference. Knopf Canada. ISBN 9780735276680.
- —— (2020). The Voyage of the Morning Light. W. W. Norton & Co. ISBN 9781324007067.
- —— (2023). The Observer. Knopf Canada. ISBN 9781039003569.
