= What Is the Electric Car? =

- Directed by: Ken Grant; Scott DuPont
- Produced by: Scott DuPont; Cam MacGregor
- Starring: Fabio; Alexandra Paul; Ed Begley, Jr. Sky McDougall; Forbes Black; Paul Scott; Zan Dubin Scott; Kevin Czinger; Ginny Scales-Medeiros
- Edited by: James Dastoli; Robert Dastoli
- Distributed by: Nemours Marketing
- Release date: December 14, 2010
- Country: United States
- Language: English

What Is the Electric Car? is a 2010 documentary film that explains the benefits of electric cars. Directed by Ken Grant and Scott DuPont, and the film features several actors, scientists, engineers and activists, all of whom contribute their thoughts and explanations regarding electric cars and electric vehicle technology.

The film premiered on December 14, 2010 at the Egyptian Theatre in Hollywood, California. One reviewer stated that the movie "teeters on the brink of tedious but repeatedly saves itself with moments of cleverness or insight."
