= Environmental Film Festival Australia =

Film festival in Australia

The Environmental Film Festival Australia is a film festival which screens domestically and internationally produced environmental films around Australia.

== History ==
The festival launched in 2010 (16 years ago) as the Environmental Film Festival Melbourne and has been held annually since. In 2015, the festival changed its name to reflect its intention to expand and held additional screenings in Canberra and Hobart. In 2016 the festival presented screenings in Melbourne, Sydney, Canberra, Adelaide and Hobart. In 2017 the festival presented screenings in Melbourne and Canberra. In 2018 the festival will present screenings in Melbourne.

== Governance ==
The festival is a 100% volunteer-run organisation. The current director is Nathan Senn. Previous directors were Brooke Daly and Chris Gerbing.

== Supporters ==
In 2015, the festival's patrons were Bob Brown, Linh Do, Adam Bandt and filmmaker, Heidi Douglas.
