= 2001 University of Washington firebombing incident =

2001 arson attack

Coordinates: 47.658°N 122.290°W

The University of Washington firebombing incident was an arson which took place in the early morning hours of May 21, 2001 when a firebomb was set off at Merrill Hall, a part of the University of Washington's Center for Urban Horticulture, causing an estimated $1.5 to $4.1 million in damages. By 2012 four of five accused conspirators behind the attack admitted their guilt in plea bargains. A fifth died by suicide in federal detention while awaiting trial.

== Arson and investigation ==
At some point in the early morning hours of May 21, 2001, a device, which consisted of a digital alarm clock wired to a 9-volt battery and a model-rocket igniter was placed in a filing cabinet in the offices of professor Toby Bradshaw. Tubs of gasoline were then placed near the cabinet, and the timer on the firebomb was set. Around 3:00 AM, a university security officer reported seeing "billowing smoke and flames" rising from the horticultural center's roof and the fire department was summoned. It took firefighters two hours to put out the conflagration, after which it was found that the office in which the blaze started was burnt down to the studs and significant damage had been done to the central hall of the building as well as several botany labs.

The Earth Liberation Front claimed responsibility for the fire ten days after it transpired. Activists Lacey Phillabaum, Jennifer Kolar, Bill Rodgers, Briana Waters and Justin Solondz eventually admitted their guilt in setting the fire. Prosecutors alleged they were part of ELF cell known as "the Family."

The motivation for the arson was rooted in suspicions by the ELF that Professor Bradshaw, a plant geneticist, was engaging in experiments funded by the industry to produce genetically-engineered trees. In their statement, the ELF claimed that "Bradshaw... continues to unleash mutant genes into the environment that is certain to cause irreversible harm to forest ecosystems... As long as universities continue to pursue this reckless 'science,' they run the risk of suffering severe losses. Our message remains clear, we are determined to stop genetic engineering."

Bradshaw states that while he had considered doing genetic research, at the time he was doing experiments on transgenic tissue samples from poplar trees, a fast-growth species which he hopes could conceivably be used to reduce the need to log natural forests if raised privately on plantations to produce pulp. Bradshaw was quoted in the University of Washington alumni magazine as saying, "I have never genetically engineered a tree, much less released one into the environment," and further explained that of the eighty samples of poplar he had been working with since 1995, none had ever left the laboratory.

The office of professor Bradshaw contained little in the way of actual research material relating to the poplar trees, and the bulk of what was destroyed in the office fire turned out to be Bradshaw's personal possessions and books. The fire did, however, destroy research materials relating to plant regeneration on Mount St. Helens after the volcanic eruption, materials relating to the restoration of wetlands and prairies, and a cache of stickseed plants which were intended to be transplanted to the Cascade Mountains to replenish dwindling wild stocks.

With little of his research damaged, Bradshaw affirmed that he would continue his research in the face of the attack. He wrote in a letter to the Los Angeles Times that, "ELF firebombings are hate crimes against those of us whose missions in life are to increase human knowledge and bring a sense of wonder to the classes we teach."

A new horticultural center was later rebuilt in 2004, costing approximately $7.2 million.

== Operation Backfire ==
The investigation into the incident was eventually merged into an FBI-led affair known as Operation Backfire which also covered six other investigations into radical environmentalist activity.

== Perpetrators and alleged perpetrators ==
=== Lacey Phillabaum and Jennifer Kolar ===
Lacey Phillabaum, a former editor of Earth First! Journal, and the narrator of a documentary film Breaking the Spell, pleaded guilty on October 4, 2006, along with Jennifer Kolar, to her role in the arson. Both women made an agreement to assist prosecutors in exchange for reduced sentences.

Phillabaum admitted to being on scene during the arson, whereas Kolar confessed only to using a knife to cut through the window to Bradshaw's office.

Both women have since been the target of derision by other activists.

=== Bill Rodgers ===
Bill Rodgers, considered by the FBI to have been a significant organizer within ELF, was alleged to have helped set the fire bombs inside the horticulture center. He was taken into custody on December 7, 2005 and was subsequently charged with one count of arson, relating to a 1998 fire. He later committed suicide in his jail cell in Flagstaff, Arizona by asphyxiating himself with a plastic bag.

=== Briana Waters ===
Briana Waters, a violin teacher and the director of the environmental documentary Watch, was convicted of involvement in the crime in 2008 and admitted her involvement in a 2011 plea deal. The original conviction was vacated by the Ninth U.S. Circuit Court of Appeals on September 15, 2010. The appeals court found that prosecutors in the original trial were improperly allowed to introduce a folder of anarchist literature that Waters was said to have given to another participant in the bombing. Judge A. Wallace Tashima stated that the articles' "repugnant and self-absorbed embrace of destruction is likely to have swayed jurors' emotions."

In June 2011, while awaiting a retrial, Water's entered a plea agreement with federal prosecutors. She admitted to charges of conspiracy and arson in the firebombing incident and to involvement in a separate 2001 arson at the Litchfield Wild Burro and Horse Corrals in Susanville, California. She also agreed to provide testimony against other alleged conspirators if called upon by the government. In exchange, prosecutors said they would recommend that she not serve any more time in prison, given she provides full and complete cooperation with ongoing investigations. Any additional time in prison will ultimately be determined by a federal judge.

At her original trial she was charged with two counts of arson, one count of conspiracy and two charges relating to the use of a destructive device in a crime of violence. She pleaded innocent to all the chargers, Waters was found guilty of the two arson counts by a Tacoma jury on March 6, 2008 and was sentenced at that time to six years in a federal prison and to pay $6 million in restitution by U.S. District Court Judge Franklin D. Burgess.

In her 2011 plea deal, Water's admitted to "arson, conspiracy to use a destructive device, possessing an unregistered destructive device and the use of an explosive device in a crime of violence." She also admitted to perjury when she declared her innocence while under oath at her 2008 trial. Waters agreed to testify against Justin Solondz, who is expected to be returned home for trial by China in the late summer. The State of California agreed not to press charges in the Litchfield arson contingent on her full cooperation with federal prosecutors.

During Waters' trial, her defense attorneys Robert Bloom and Neil Fox contested the testimony of Kolar and Phillabaum and sought to have U.S. assistant Attorney Andrew Friedman removed from the case for misconduct in creating a misleading summary. They failed in that attempt.

=== Justin Solondz ===
Justin Franchi Solondz, who previously dated Briana Waters while attending Evergreen State College at the time of the arson, evaded charges for several years. He was indicted for arson and conspiracy in absentia in 2006, and was eventually arrested in Dali, China in March 2009 on charges of growing marijuana. He pleaded guilty to manufacturing drugs in a daylong trial and was sentenced to three years in prison by a local court. He was deported back to the U.S. to face charges there after his sentence was completed. He pleaded guilty to planning the UW arson and was sentenced to seven years in prison.

Solondz admitted to involvement in the construction of the incendiary devices used in the bombing and said that he was also involved in arsons in Oregon and California, totaling $6 million in damages.
