= The Last Paradises: On the Track of Rare Animals =

- The Last Paradises
- Directed by: Eugen Schuhmacher
- Written by: Eugen Schuhmacher
- Produced by: Eugen Schuhmacher
- Narrated by: Wolf Ackva
- Cinematography: Eugen Schuhmacher; Helmuth Barth; Freimut Kalden
- Music by: Erich Bender; Günter Fuhlisch
- Distributed by: Globus Film
- Release date: 28 February 1967 (West Germany)
- Running time: 116 min.
- Languages: German; German (with subtitles); English dubbing
- Budget: DM 1.000.000 (about $ 250.000)

The Last Paradises: On the Track of Rare Animals (in German Die letzen Paradiese) is the title of a German nature documentary from 1967. It was filmed by Eugen Schuhmacher and Helmuth Barth.

== Background ==
The filming began in spring 1959. Schuhmacher and his cinematographer Helmuth Barth (who has later worked on the Academy Award-winning movie The Hellstrom Chronicle) have gone on a 7-year travel (from 1959 to 1966) to film several of the most endangered animals of the world. It had costs of about $250,000. There is also a book reference which was translated into many languages. It was narrated by German actor Wolf Ackva.

== Plot summary ==
After an animated introduction about the history of extinct species (e.g. the quagga, the great auk and the dodo) it has gone to 60 countries and territories (including Turkey, Spain, Germany, Poland, Australia, Borneo, Chile, Spitzbergen, New Zealand, Papua New Guinea, India, Java, United States, and Peru) on all continents and to the most famous national parks. Species like the Hamilton's frog (Leiopelma hamiltoni) or the Javan rhinoceros were filmed for the very first time. Other sequences including footage of the kakapo, the takahe, the dancing of the red-crowned cranes, the fishing Kodiak bears, the whooping crane, the Asiatic lion, the Komodo dragon, the tuatara, the indri, and the birds of paradise. In particular the filming of the whooping cranes was the result of adventurous circumstances. Because the whooping crane was among the rarest birds in the world in the early 1960s there was no permission to entry the Aransas National Wildlife Refuge in Texas. Fortunately the cranes were provided with food by a plane and during that time the birds came to a wetland in the proximity of the fence. Schuhmacher and Barth planted themselves in a boat in a channel in front of the fence and were able to take some footage from a female and a chicken.

== Awards ==
The film received awards at the Documentary film festival at Trento
