= Michael P. Nash =

American film director

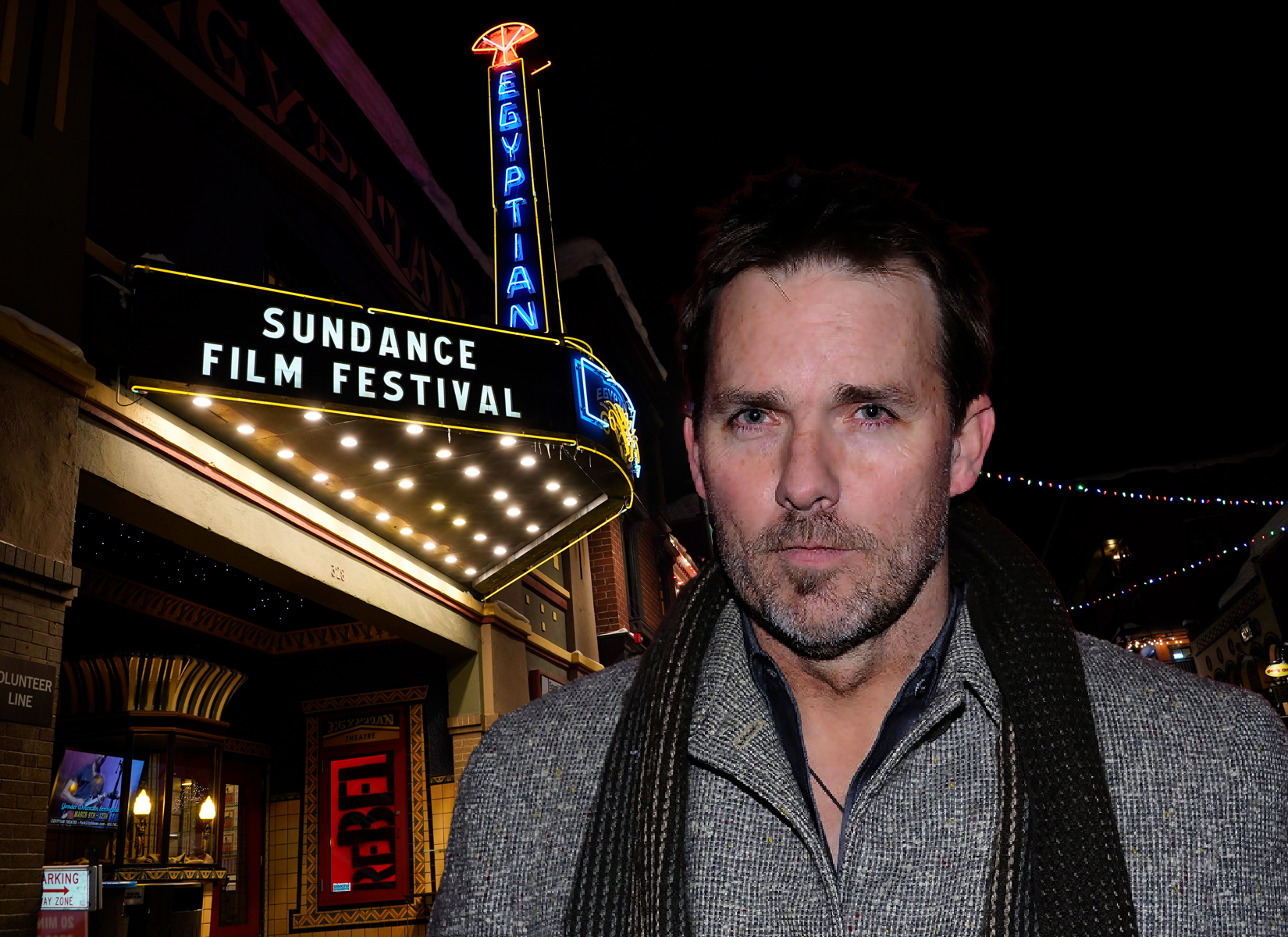
- Nash in 2010
- Born: Chicago, Illinois
- Occupations: Film director Screenwriter; Film producer
- Known for: Climate Refugees

Michael P. Nash is an American film director, screenwriter and producer. He is the founder of Beverly Hills Productions.

Nash has directed the films Climate Refugees, Fuel, Nebraska, Playground of the Native Son, Saving the Roar, and Captain Counter Culture for which he has won several domestic and international awards. In 2024, Nash became the first filmmaker to have his film land on the surface of the moon in a lunar museum.

== Early life and education ==
Born in Chicago, Illinois, Nash moved to Hutchinson Island at the age of 16, where he attended John Carroll High School. He spent his early years in Fort Pierce and Vero Beach before living in Atlanta, New York City, and Los Angeles.

Growing up near the Indian River Lagoon, a biodiverse estuary in the United States, Nash developed an interest in environmental themes which was reflected in his 2010 documentary Climate Refugees.

== Career ==
In 2008, Nash's first debut documentary film, Fuel, was released. He also received the Global Innovation Award for his film, Fuel.

In 2010, his documentary Climate Refugees was released. The documentary explored the global impact of climate change by visiting 48 countries. The film premiered at the 2010 Sundance Film Festival and received critical acclaim. Climate Refugees was also shown at the L.A. Film Festival and was screened by the United Nations. In September 2023, during Climate Week, an exhibition featuring the art collection from the documentary Climate Refugees was held in New York City.

In 2013, Nash co-directed a documentary film named, Playground of the Native Son. It chronicles the story of The Hominy Indians, an all-Native American football team from Osage Nations, Oklahoma, who defied racial segregation and discrimination in the 1920s to challenge the New York Giants, the reigning World Champions, in 1927. In 2014, the film was screened at the Oklahoma Indian Summer Native Film Festival.

In 2021, Nash directed Saving the Roar. It documents the 2012 Penn State football team's journey to redefine success and honor in the face of adversity. A year later, he worked on Captain Counter Culture which premiered at the Woodstock Film Festival as a feature documentary.

In 2024, Nash became the first filmmaker to have his film land on the surface of the moon in a lunar museum.

Nash is the founder of Beverly Hills Production. He also serves as a member of the UN advisory panel. During the Copenhagen COP15 conference Nash, considered an expert on environmental migration, helped the UN frame the issue of environmental migrants.

Nash is currently working on a sequel titled Chasing Truth, with executive producers including Leonardo DiCaprio. The film is set for release in 2025. It aims to investigate the critical intersection of overpopulation, climate change, and resource scarcity.

== Filmography ==
- Fuel (2008)
- Climate Refugees (2010)
- Nebraska (2013)
- Playground of The Native Son (2013)
- Saving The Roar (2021)
- Captain Counter Culture (2022)
- Chasing Truth (2025)

== Awards and recognition ==
- 2007: Global Innovation Award
- 2010: Barbara Boxer's Conservation Champion Award
- 2010: Neiman Marcus Environmental Filmmakers Vision Award at the Dallas International Film Festival.
- 2010: Top 10 MovieMakers of the Planet by MovieMaker Magazine
