= Game farm =

Designated place for raising game animals

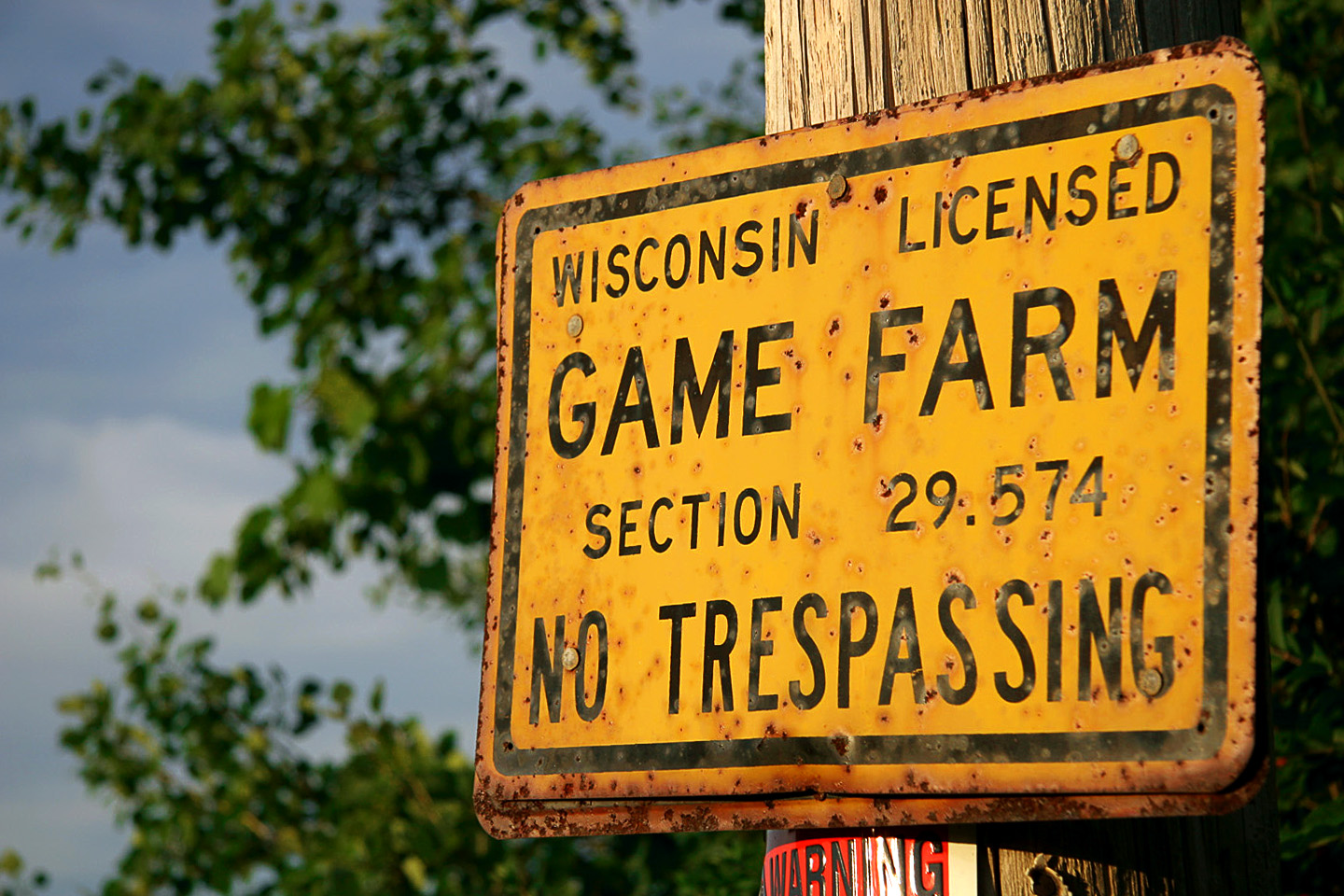
"No trespassing" sign of a game farm in Dane County, Wisconsin

A game farm is a place where game animals are raised to stock wildlife areas for hunting. The term also includes places where such animals are raised to be sold as food or for photography. Their existence has been exemplified within the South African countryside where they have become prevalent. The wildlife that is hunted is used for consumption as well for ecotourism. Local laws in South Africa during the 20th century have allowed the private ownership of wildlife, which has enabled the expansion and economic feasibility of game farms over typical livestock farming.

== Wildlife Conservation ==
Wildlife conservation is a costly endeavor for most African countries. One of the more common forms of generating income to establish a sustainable economy to provide for wildlife conservation is known as wildlife viewing tourism. However, this attraction still does not generate enough to establish wildlife conservation. For regions that suffer political and economic instability; sustainable trophy hunting may be the only feasible source of income in order to generate the appropriate income. Once established, another aspect to consider is the management of the land being used for hunting. Naturally, wildlife decreases with the increase of human presence which puts a strain on the quality of hunting. Generally, leases for hunting concessions are set up to last for multiple years all at once in order to encourage hunting operators to continue to manage the land for hunting. However, as the quality of hunting decreases, leases are shortened and this creates an overall negative impact to the economy.

Many African countries benefit from community based conservation. This concept explores the relationship between wild life and people and the notion that conserving every animal is also not sustainable because certain animals threaten human lives and crops. One of the biggest arguments in support of community based conservation is that allowing people to gain economic benefits from wildlife, incentives for conservation are, in turn, provided. One such country that benefits from adopting this strategy is Zambia. The Zambian government established a wildlife conservation fund to act as the responsible player for redistributing funds from the hunting industry into wild life conservation and community development.

== Ethical Problems ==
Using game hunting as a conservation tool has negative perceptions that impose harsh restrictions across several different countries in Africa. Some of the activities that promote hunting bans include canned hunting, shooting young or uncommon animals, shooting from vehicles, use of bait, spotlights and hounds are all hunting practices that bring into question many ethical problems.

Furthermore, on an international level, there are ethical issues such as the hunting and killing of Cecil the Lion. An American dentist by the name of Walter James Palmer, of Eden Prairie, Minnesota, killed Cecil the Lion during a hunting trip in Zimbabwe. This news made international headlines as Cecil the Lion was a participant in a study that was being conducted by Oxford University in Britain, and Cecil had also been outfitted with a GPS collar for this study. Eventually, Palmer was not charged in the slaying of Cecil due to his hunting permit and has been allowed back in the country exclusively as a visitor.

== Game Farming in South Africa ==
South Africa is considered to be one of the hallmarks for game farms and game reserves. The biodiverse ecosystem that exists in South Africa is the foundation that provides one of the most prosperous game meat in the African continent. The land displays a diverse array of animals such as the Big Five; lion, leopard, rhinoceros, elephant, and Cape buffalo. Game farms are said to have produced new avenues for prosperity such as trophy hunting, game-meat production, and eco-tourism.

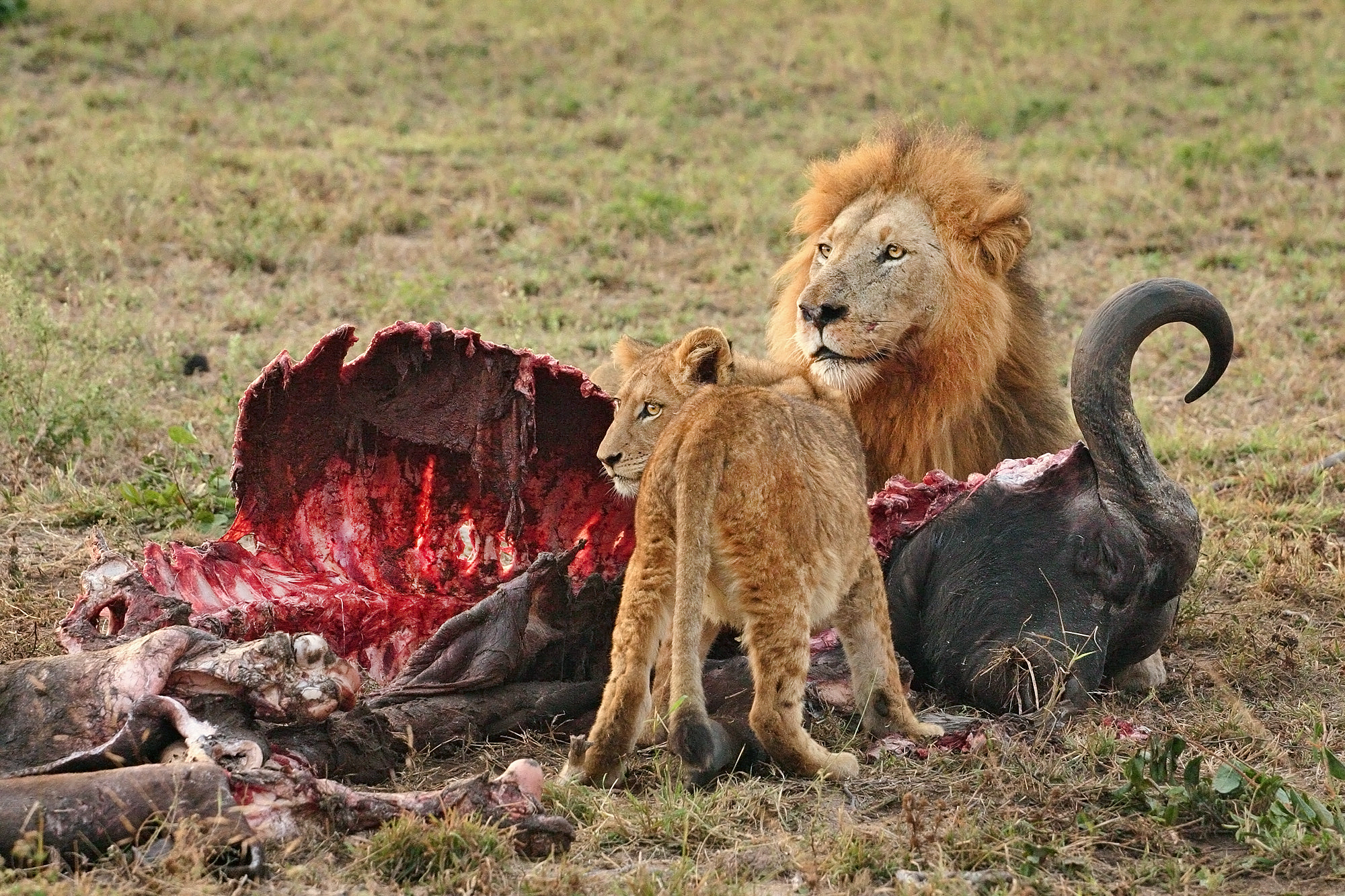
Male lion and cub feeding on a Cape buffalo, Sabi Sand Game Reserve

=== Ecotourism Component ===
Tourism is viewed as key strategy that can eventually lead to economic prosperity which in turn would promote development in the local communities. The South African government has capitalized on this through utilizing their wildlife to promote ecotourism. Post-apartheid, significant developments have been made to achieve success in this area. Today, an abundance of tourists and travelers flock to South Africa with their main goal being to see its natural environment. Game Farms are said to deliver a unique experience because they provide the opportunity for visitors to observe and experience wildlife at close range. The South African government has made efforts to utilize these game farms as developed sustainable ecotourism attractions. Wildlife hunters are extremely attracted to private games farms which can produce higher income compared some of South Africa's most successful nature reserves. The commercial success of these game farms has forced many agricultural farms to adapt and be converted into game farms.

=== Controversy in the Eastern Cape ===
Game farming in the Eastern Cape has been cited as land-use practice issue which has left many feeling disenfranchised. This stems from the context of wealth, class, and race which have created a diverse range of problems for local communities. People who do not have the financial structure to enter a game farm are said to appropriate bushmeat through illegal hunting where poachers are the primary actors. Structural inequalities between various stakeholders are at the epicenter of the issue. Game farms create network that is internationally proactive and interconnected but fractured at the local level due to racial inequalities that have plagued South Africa. This dichotomy of the two networks have created spaces for international clients and local elites to congregate and engage in trophy hunting due to private ownership which in turn ignores the advancement of rural employment.

== See also ==
- Game reserve
- Fish hatchery
- Wildlife farming
- Dawie Groenewald, South African game farmer and convicted wildlife trafficker
