= Powerful: Energy for Everyone =

Powerful: Energy for Everyone is a 2010 Canadian documentary that explores different sources of renewable energy.

David Chernushenko takes audiences on a global journey to discover different ways of achieving a more sustainable lifestyle. The film introduces audiences to communities, both small and large, that have managed to adapt their way of life and embrace renewable energy.

== See also ==
- The Fourth Revolution: Energy
- Community solar farm
- Community wind energy
- RAPS
- Wadebridge Renewable Energy Network
