= GMO OMG =

- Directed by: Jeremy Seifert
- Written by: Julius Jaensch
- Produced by: Elizabeth Kucinich
- Production company: Compeller Pictures
- Distributed by: Submarine Deluxe
- Release date: September 13, 2013
- Running time: 83 minutes
- Country: United States
- Language: English
- Box office: $47,500

GMO OMG is a 2013 American pseudoscientific documentary film which takes a negative view towards the use of genetically modified organisms used in the production of food, in the United States. The film focuses on Monsanto, a multinational agrochemical and agricultural biotechnology corporation, and their role in the food industry alongside the effects of GMOs and how they are generated.

Directed by Jeremy Seifert and produced by Elizabeth Kucinich, it was given a limited release in the United States on September 13, 2013, and received negative reviews from critics. GMO OMG follows Seifert's search of answers: how do GMOs affect people and the planet. These and other questions take Seifert on a journey from his family’s table to Haiti, Paris, Norway, and agra-giant Monsanto.

The sole study specifically cited was widely discredited; see Séralini affair.

== Film content ==
Jeremy Seifert’s goal in GMO OMG is to say that citizens of the U.S. are inadequately informed about the corporate manipulation of the food supply. Seifert travels to Haiti, Norway and Paris and interviews commercial and private farmers in order to understand more about their use in these industries. In Haiti, Seifert explores the Peasant Movement of Papaye’s resistance towards the help of Monsanto and continues his travels to the Svalbard Global Seed Vault that contains 700,000 samples of seeds from every country on earth to prevent the extinction of certain plant species. Seifert ends his world travels in Paris where he talks to scientists about the effects of GMOs on humans. While at home in the U.S. Seifert travels through California to different farms with his family to emphasize how important it is to him that people be more concerned with what they are eating themselves and feeding their families. Seifert also travels to a Monsanto location where he is rejected.

== Reviews and criticisms ==
The documentary received mixed reviews. Rotten Tomatoes rated the documentary at 56% approval rating based on 16 critics' reviews, with an average score of 5.25/10.

Jeannette Catsoulis of The New York Times calling it, "a gentle, flyover alert to obliviously chowing-down citizens ... without hectoring and with no small amount of charm". RogerEbert.com claims that GMO OMG is an advocacy film inspired by Michael Moore's "Roger and Me", a documentary in which Moore sets out to find the answer to why General Motors closed all of its plants in Flint, Michigan beginning in 1978. Simon Abrams, the writer of "GMO OMG"'s review on the Roger Ebert website, states that "Seifert's arguments are dependent on unconvincing testimony and leaps in logic" and that "Seifert is apparently mistrustful of scientific terms, studies, and concepts". RogerEbert.com gave "GMO OMG" a one star rating out of a possible five.

Michael Specter of the New Yorker wrote a scathing review of the documentary in which he dubbed the film "aggressively uninformed". Specter furthers Abram's notion that the documentary is based on the unreliable testimony of witnesses who are not actually scientists, and that Seifert's film is characterized by intellectual laziness. Scientific American wrote a review titled ""GMO OMG" SRSLY? An #EpicFail in Exercising Our Right To Know", which debunks Seifert's verdict of "science is still out" on whether GMOs are harmful or not. Ferris Jabr, the author of the article, claims that GMO OMG utilizes biased research and statistics that are taken out of their original context.
