= G2 Green Earth Film Festival =

Annual environmental film festival

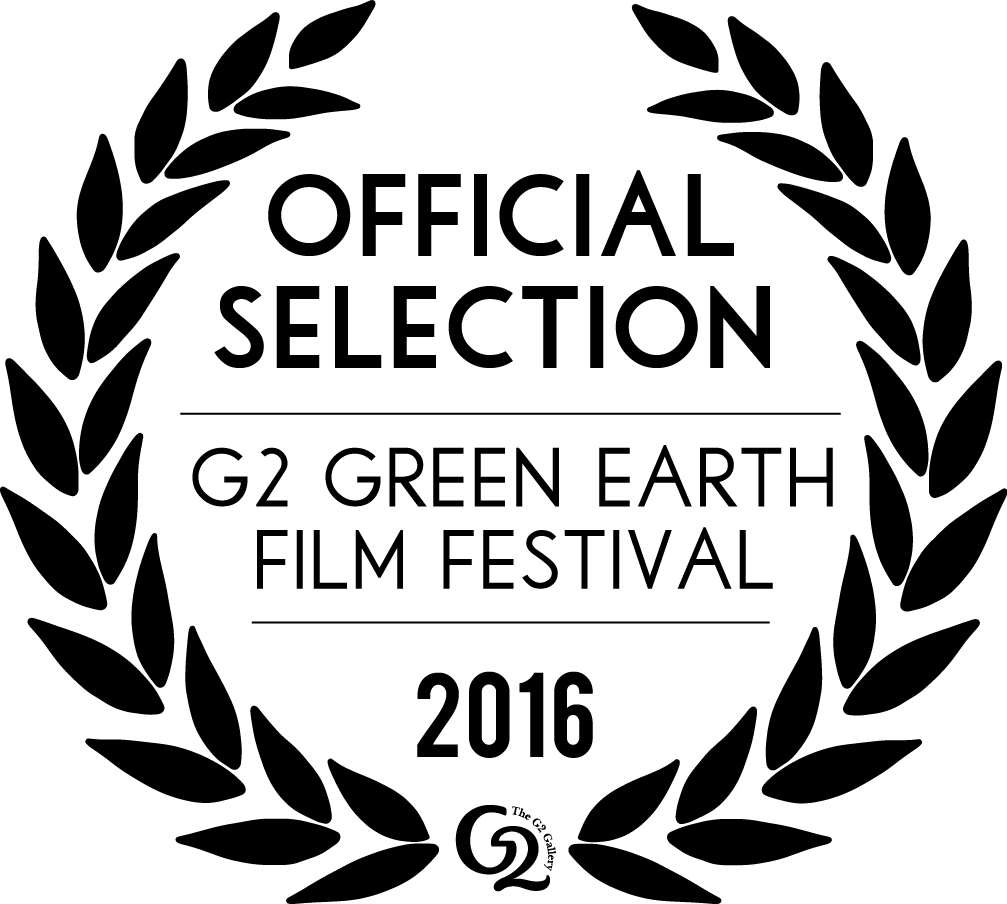

The G2 Green Earth Film Festival is an annual environmental film festival that takes place at The G2 Gallery in Venice, California. The festival began in 2013 and screens eco-centered documentaries and narrative films alongside panel discussions and celebratory parties.

Films that have screened in previous festivals include Official Sundance Film Festival Selection A Fierce Green Fire, Project Wild Thing, Mile...Mile and a Half, Medicine of the Wolf and Inhabit.

All proceeds made from donations during the festival are given to 501(c)(3) nonprofit environmental organizations. Past organizations that have partnered with G2 Green Earth Film Festival include Greenpeace and Western National Parks Association.
