= Amour, sexe et mobylette =

2008 French documentary film

- Directed by: Maria Silvia Bazzoli, Christian Lelong
- Screenplay by: Maria Silvia Bazzoli, Christian Lelong
- Produced by: Cinédoc Films, Fechner Media
- Cinematography: Christian Lelong
- Edited by: Fanny Lelong
- Music by: Yoni
- Release date: November 2008 (Festival dei Popoli)
- Running time: 95 minutes
- Countries: France; Germany

Amour, sexe et mobylette (Love, sex, and moped) is a 2008 French documentary film about romance in Burkina Faso.
