= The End of Eden =

- Directed by: Rick Lomba
- Release dates: 1 January 1986
- Country: South Africa

The End of Eden is a 1986 environmental documentary in which the South African filmmaker Rick Lomba (1950–1994) showed the rapid degradation of Africa's ecosystems. The introduction of cattle ranching and the beef industry in the southern African landscape is featured prominently within the film as a primary source of devastation to the land.

The film is severely critical of the policies of the World Bank and other international banks in advocating and funding African industrial agricultural and cattle breeding projects in an attempt to boost African economies. It portrays graphically the otherwise forbidden pesticides used to try to eradicate the tsetse fly, which he describes as the last bastion of defence the wilderness has against the encroachment of civilisation, and the erosion and overgrazing that results. Some of it is filmed from a microlight aircraft which he used to approach these areas.

Numerous interviews with persons engaged in conservation, big-game hunting, hunger relief and agriculture are presented as well as some economically and environmentally sustainable alternatives such as wildlife farming.

The documentary was written and directed by Rick Lomba, produced by Rick Lomba Productions and narrated by American actor Jeff Folger.

It was funded by the First National Bank and appeared on television for about three years, after which it inexplicably disappeared from circulation.
