= Rebecca Ore =

American writer (born 1948)

- Born: 1948 (age 77–78); Louisville, Kentucky, U.S.
- Education: Columbia University
- Occupation: Writer
- Writing career
- Pen name: Rebecca Ore
- Genre: Science fiction

Rebecca Ore is the pseudonym of science fiction writer Rebecca B. Brown. She was born in Louisville, Kentucky, in 1948. In 1968, she moved to New York City and attended Columbia University. Rebecca Ore is known for the Becoming Alien series and her short stories.

Her novel, Time's Child, was published by Eos (HarperCollins) in February 2007. Centuries Ago and Very Fast, described as a "collection of linked stories", was published by Aqueduct Press in April 2009.

== Awards ==
Ore was shortlisted for the John W. Campbell Award for Best New Writer in 1988. Becoming Alien and Being Alien were each nominated for a Philip K. Dick Award in 1988 and 1989. Her short story "Accelerated Grimace" was shortlisted for an Otherwise Award in 1998. Centuries Ago and Very Fast was a finalist for the 2010 Lambda Literary Award for Science Fiction, Fantasy and Horror.

== Bibliography ==
=== Becoming Alien Series ===
- —— (1988). Becoming Alien (paperback ed.). Tor Books. pp. 1–313. ISBN 978-0812547948.
- —— (1989). Being Alien (paperback ed.). Tor Books. pp. 1–288. ISBN 978-0812547924.
- —— (1990). Human to Human (paperback ed.). Tor Books. pp. 1–282. ISBN 978-0812500455.

=== Novels ===
- —— (1991). The Illegal Rebirth of Billy the Kid (mass market paperback 1st ed.). Tor Books. pp. 1–320. ISBN 978-0812506723.
- —— (1994). Slow Funeral (hardcover ed.). Tor Books. pp. 1–316. ISBN 978-0312852016.
- —— (1995). Gaia's Toys (hardcover ed.). Tor Books. pp. 1–316. ISBN 978-0312857813.
- —— (2000). Outlaw School (paperback ed.). Harper Voyager. pp. 1–320. ISBN 978-0380792504.
- —— (2007). Time's Child (paperback ed.). Harper Voyager. pp. 1–327. ISBN 978-0380792528.

=== Novel/collection of linked stories ===
- Centuries Ago and Very Fast (2009)
