= Watch (film) =

2001 film

- Directed by: Briana Waters
- Written by: Briana Waters
- Produced by: Briana Waters
- Edited by: Briana Waters; Gary Varnell
- Music by: The Ceili Bandits; Clandestine; Dead Can Dance; Joules Graves; Timothy Hull; Anthea Lawrence; Sapphire; Spirit of the First Peoples ¡Tchkung!
- Distributed by: Greenerella Productions
- Release date: 2001
- Running time: 66 minutes
- Country: United States
- Language: English

Watch is a 2001 documentary written, directed and produced by environmental activist Briana Waters, who is serving a six-year sentence for charges relating to the University of Washington firebombing incident. The film portrays the cooperation between residents of the Washington logging town, Randle, and Cascadia Defense Network activists attempting to stop the clearcutting of old growth trees on Watch mountain (part of the Cascade Mountain range) and along the nearby Fossil Creek. The film served as Waters' senior project at Evergreen State College.

== Synopsis ==
The film opens with the Plum Creek Timber Company attempting to exchange ownership of 54,000 acres (220 km^{2}) of land to the federal government in exchange for 17,000 acres (69 km^{2}) considered more suitable for commercial logging, in what will become known as the I-90 land exchange. This exchange, if approved will give Plum Creek ownership of 5,554 acres (22.48 km^{2}) from the Gifford Pinchot National Forest, which includes Watch mountain and land surrounding Fossil Creek, near Randle. Residents of the town, in addition to young activists, express concern that Plum Creek logging operations will destroy old growth forest in the area and damage the local eco-system of the creek, resulting in mudslides.

Watch documents the responses of residents of Randle as well as the activists who come to engage in tree sitting as a means of deterring Plum Creek logging. Footage includes two town meetings addressing the issue of the logging, protests outside of and inside of Plum Creek's offices in Seattle, confrontations with police, and acts of support by the Cowlitz tribe.

In November 1999, Plum Creek agrees to remove the disputed areas from the draft of their land exchange agreement, and the finalized exchange grants them rights to only 11,556 acres (46.77 km^{2}) of land, primarily east of Cascades, with Watch mountain and Fossil Creek excluded from the deal. The film ends with the activists tearing down their own platforms in the old growth canopy, and gathering celebrate their victory.
