= The Fourth Revolution: Energy =

The Fourth Revolution: Energy Autonomy
- Film poster
- Directed by: Carl-A. Fechner
- Written by: Carl-A. Fechner
- Produced by: Carl-A. Fechner
- Starring: Hermann Scheer; Fatih Birol; Preben Maegaard; Muhammed Yunus; Matthias Willenbacher; Bianca Jagger
- Cinematography: Sorin Dragoi
- Edited by: Mona Bräuer
- Music by: Natalia Dittrich
- Release date: March 18, 2010
- Running time: 83 minutes
- Country: Germany
- Language: German

The 4th Revolution: Energy Autonomy, also known as Die 4. Revolution – Energy Autonomy, is a German documentary film about renewable energy by Carl-A. Fechner, released in 2010. It depicts a vision for a global society that obtains 100% of its energy from renewable sources and the complete reconstruction of the economy that this will require.

Production took four years and was financed by individuals. Parts of the film were made in 10 countries, showing existing pioneer projects in different cultures, from those funded by Nobel Peace Prize laureate Muhammed Yunus through micro-credit, to the vision of the Right Livelihood Award laureate Hermann Scheer of Eurosolar, to modern businesses working in the renewable energy sector. The film launched in cinemas in Germany March 18, 2010 and had its U.S. premiere at the San Francisco Green Film Festival in March 2011.

In the German trailer to the film, the revolution in capitalist ownership of energy resources is stressed; Hermann Scheer says that "instead of a few owners we will have hundreds of thousands..." and "energy supply will be democratized". The film embodies the philosophy of Hermann Scheer, who died in 2010.

== See also ==
- Fourth Industrial Revolution
