= Elizabeth Kucinich =

British activist

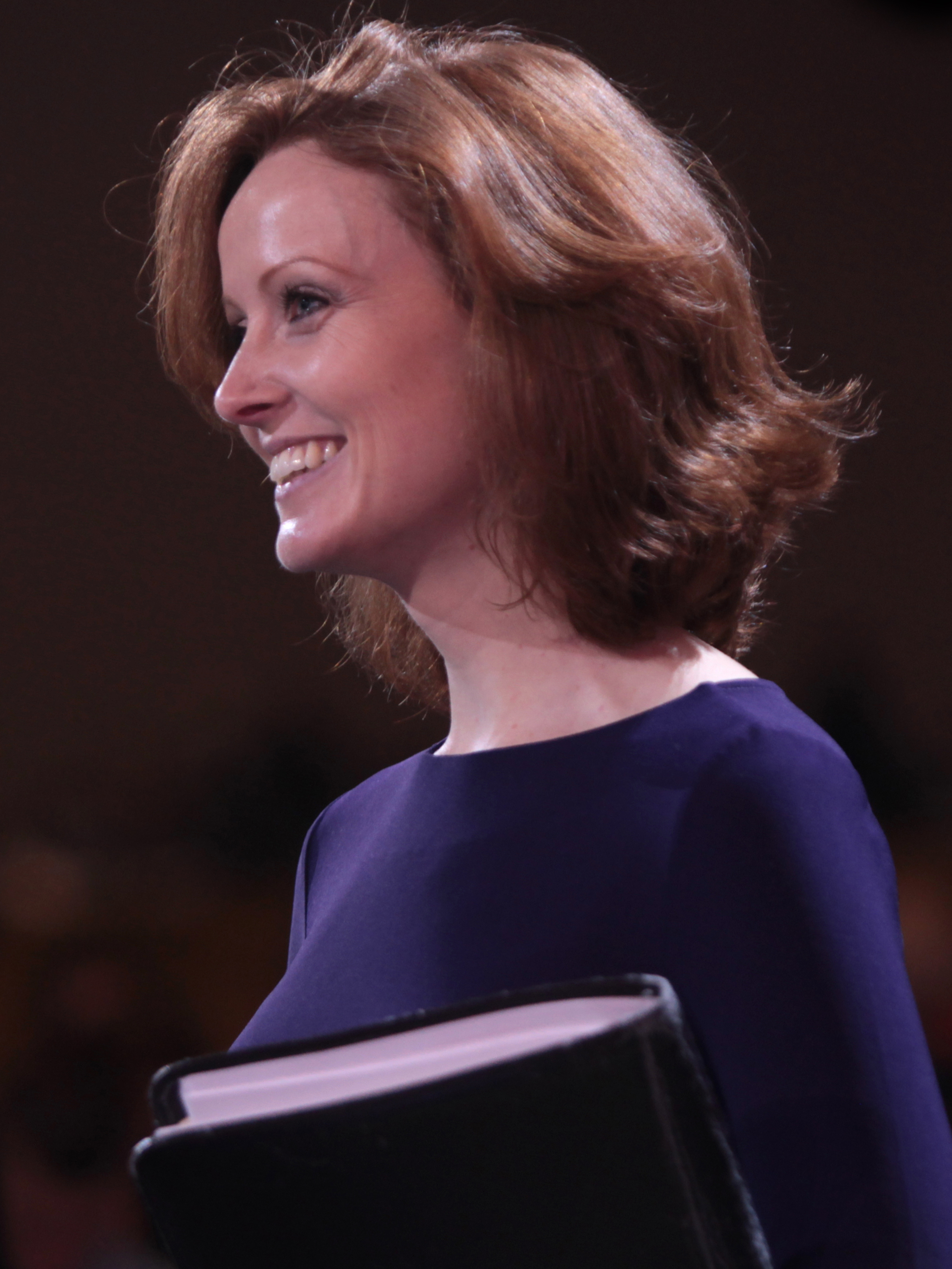
- Kucinich in 2015
- Born: Elizabeth Jane Harper; 22 October 1977 (age 48); London, England
- Occupation: Activist
- Spouse: Dennis Kucinich (m. 2005)
- Website: ElizabethKucinich.com

Elizabeth Jane Kucinich (née Harper; born 22 October 1977) is a British organic food and vegan advocate. She has produced two documentaries and is married to the retired eight-term US Congressman and two-time Democratic presidential candidate Dennis Kucinich.

== Early life ==
Born Elizabeth Jane Harper, daughter of Graham Harper and Julia Massey (divorced), she was brought up in North Ockendon in the London Borough of Havering, England.

Kucinich holds a BA in Religious Studies and Theology and an MA in International Conflict Analysis from the University of Kent and also has a certificate in Peace and Reconciliation Studies from Coventry University.

== Career ==
In 2005, after working with rural and urban poor in India and Tanzania, Kucinich moved to the US to organize the first international conference on monetary reform for the American Monetary Institute. She has also been the Director of Policy at the Center for Food Safety and the government affairs director for the Physicians Committee for Responsible Medicine (PCRM) and a congressional liaison for the former President of the United Nations General Assembly.

In December 2012 she launched a career selling real estate. "Real estate is a longtime passion," she said.

Kucinich was on the board of directors of several organizations, including Sean Penn's Haitian relief organization, J/P HRO and is on the board of the Rodale Institute; In 2013 she became a Director of Policy with the Center for Food Safety, and joined the board of directors of UNRWA USA in October 2014.

Kucinich is executive producer of GMO OMG, an anti-GMO film.

== Personal life ==
Recently arrived from England, she visited the office of Congressman Dennis Kucinich with her boss from the American Monetary Institute on 4 May 2005. They have described this initial interaction as "soul recognition", and they married less than four months later.

Kucinich's appearance has been noted in the media. Vanity Fair magazine named her among the nation's "best dressed" political wives and Cleveland Magazine pegged her as "Cleveland's most interesting". The Washington Post's Alexandra Petri described her as "a treasured District landmark". She has also made an appearance on The Daily Show.

== Filmography ==
Year	Title	Role	Notes
2013	GMO OMG	Producer	
2015	Hot Water	Producer	
2015	Circle of Poison	Narrator	
