= Clouds of Smoke (2007 film) =

- Directed by: Fatmir Terziu
- Written by: Fatmir Terziu
- Produced by: Fatmir Terziu
- Release date: 2007
- Countries: Albania, United Kingdom

Clouds of Smoke is a documentary directed and produced by Fatmir Terziu. It explores the recent phenomenon of global warming and asks several environmental questions. It mainly focuses on the environmental damage caused by Albania, especially its biggest industrial city, Elbasan. The documentary started as a collaboration with the Department for Environment, Food and Rural Affairs (DEFRA), and it was created for the purpose of educating students at London South Bank University. It was chosen to be shown at Curzon, London, the first documentary directed by an Albanian director to be selected.
