= Dandhy Laksono =

Indonesian activist

Dandhy Dwi Laksono (born 29 June 1976) is an Indonesian activist, investigative journalist, and filmmaker. He is known for the 2019 documentary film Sexy Killers, released prior to the 2019 Indonesian general election, which documented the collusion between the political establishment and the coal mining industry which is responsible for the environmental destruction. Dandhy was arrested in September 2019 for making tweets about violence by the state apparatus in the Indonesian Papua. The arrest was heavily criticized by the human rights groups.

== Biography ==
Dandhy Dwi Laksono was born and raised in Lumajang Regency, a small town in East Java, Indonesia. Coming from a family of civil servants, his parents initially expected him to pursue a career in the public sector. He was once offered a place at the School of Public Administration (STPDN), a government institution that prepares students for bureaucratic positions. However, he declined the offer and instead chose to study at Padjadjaran University in Bandung, West Java, where he majored in International Relations.

Dandhy is the founder of documentary production studio Watch Doc. He previously worked with Acehkita.com, Liputan 6 of SCTV, RCTI, and ABC Radio.

Dandhy directed a documentary film Sexy Killers which was released on April 14, 2019, ahead of the ballot day of the 2019 general election. The film sparked national debates as it revealed the ties between the presidential candidates and the coal mining industry, which causes environmental destruction and economic impact toward the impoverished classes. The film is a final piece to Laksono's 12-part documentary series Ekspedisi Indonesia Biru (Blue Indonesia Expedition) which aims to assess economic development and its environmental impact in Indonesia.

Dandhy, together with Cypri Dale, directed a documentary film Pig Feast: Colonialism in Our Time which premiered in Auckland on 7 March 2026.

=== 2019 arrest ===
Dandhy was arrested by the Bekasi police on September 26, 2019, for writing a Twitter thread about the violent clashes in Jayapura and Wamena, Papua, with the photos of students who were allegedly wounded by gunshots. Dandhy was named a suspect by the police of violating Article 28 and Article 29 of the Electronic Information and Transaction (ITE) Law. The police accused him of spreading information to sow hatred based on ethnicity, religion, or race. The arrest was conducted without a summons to testify as a witness. Dandhy's lawyer Alghiffari Aqsa defended Dandhy by stating that his statements on Twitter are part of his freedom of expression. Human rights and press freedom activists slammed the police decision, stating the freedom of expression is guaranteed by the 1945 constitution. Dandhy was released by the police on September 27, 2019.

=== 2024 election ===
In 2024, shortly before the 2024 Indonesian general election, the YouTube documentary Dirty Vote was published, directed by Dandhy. The documentary featured several legal academics and "explained how the instruments of state power has been used to win the election, even as it impacts and damages the democratic order". It also alleged that outgoing President Joko Widodo used state funds to support his defence minister Prabowo Subianto's presidential campaign.
