= Sexy Killers =

- Directed by: Dandhy Dwi Laksono; Ucok Suparta
- Produced by: Didit Haryo Wicaksono
- Production company: WatchDoc
- Release date: 14 April 2019
- Running time: 86 minutes
- Country: Indonesia
- Language: Indonesian

Sexy Killers is a 2019 Indonesian documentary film directed by Dandhy Dwi Laksono and Ucok Suparta about the coal mining industry and its relations with the Indonesian political establishment. The film is a final piece to Laksono's 12-part documentary series Ekspedisi Indonesia Biru (Blue Indonesia Expedition) which aims to assess economic development and its environmental impact in Indonesia. The producer was Didit Haryo Wicaksono and the film was released by the independent film studio WatchDoc. The film was released on 14 April 2019 ahead of the 2019 Indonesian general election.

== Overview ==
Coal mines in East Kalimantan province power thermal power stations mostly in Java and Bali. The mining causes substantial societal damages to the nearby populations mostly by ground subsidence as well as deaths of children falling into the leftover pits. Local and national governments back the mining companies by forcefully seize people's land and removing the rainforests. Barges that leave the Kalimantan island intrude on the maritime national conservation area, damaging the coral reefs and surrounding ecosystem. Both in Java and Bali, the construction boom of thermal power plants are obstructing the local agricultural and fishery industries. Local populations have no means of raising their voices in the face of national government-backed developments in such area.

Tracing the shareholders and founders of coal mining companies, it is possible to illustrate the links between the fossil fuel industry and the Indonesian political elites of different political affiliation. Adaro Energy owns a coal mine in East Kalimantan and operates a coal-fueled power plant in Jakarta through its subsidiary. Among the Adaro's founders are Sandiaga Uno, a running mate of the presidential candidate Prabowo Subianto, as well as Erick Thohir, a spokesman of rivaling presidential candidate Joko Widodo. Sandiaga, after announcing his candidacy, sold US$9.2 million share in private-equity firm Saratoga Investama Sedaya to a coal industry company Toba Bara Sejahtera, which is owned by Luhut Binsar Pandjaitan, the incumbent Coordinating Minister for Maritime Affairs under Joko Widodo's Working Cabinet. Toba Bara Sejahtera also owns a developer company Rakabu Sejahtera which was founded by Widodo and currently owned by Widodo's son. Most of the companies involved in the coal mining industry are listed in the Indonesian Stock Exchange as sharia-compliant, and the certification is made by the Indonesian Ulema Council (MUI) which was headed by Ma'ruf Amin, Widodo's running mate.

== Production ==
Dandhy Dwi Laksono and Ucok Suparta, journalists, traveled through the Indonesian archipelago to film the documentary in 2015.

== Release ==
The film was initially screened at around 470 locations throughout Indonesia, organized by individual supporters. Subsequently, after, the film was uploaded on WatchDoc's official YouTube channel on 14 April 2019, within a week before the ballot day of the 2019 general election. As of January 2021, the video has recorded over 35 million views. Community screenings were held on over 1000 occasions since then. WatchDoc also held a roadshow for screening the film across the archipelago, especially in the places directly affected by the coal industry. Several local authorities and universities attempted to ban the film screening, including in Indramayu and Banyuwangi for the accusations of spreading "hate speech" against both of the presidential candidates, Joko Widodo and Prabowo Subianto.

== Reception ==
Hindun Mulaika of Greenpeace Indonesia evaluated that Sexy Killers exposed the political elites' collusion with the fossil fuel industry at the expense of environmental and social impacts. Merah Johansyah of the Mining Advocacy Network (Jatam) doubled down on the premise of the film by pointing out that both candidates are funded to a large degree by fossil fuel companies. The film sparked nationwide debate on the oligarchy, legitimacy of political elites, as well as negative environmental impact of the fossil fuel industry. The producer Didit was criticized for encouraging abstention or casting blank vote (golput) to the 2019 elections. Didit responded to critics by saying the film does not make any call to not vote.
