= Rick Lomba =

South African filmmaker (1950–1994)

- Rick Lomba
- Born: 1950
- Died: 1994 (aged 43–44)
- Citizenship: South Africa
- Occupations: documentary filmmaker, environmentalist

Rick Lomba (1950–1994) was a South African documentary filmmaker, environmentalist and Carte Blanche cameraman. He was also a lobbyist at the European Parliament and the US Congress against their cattle policies in Botswana. His main concern was the invasion of cattle into the Okavango Delta and the construction of the Northern Buffalo Fence. He was killed in 1994 while on location in Angola filming the Luanda Zoo Rescue Operation when he was attacked by an escaped Bengal tiger.

A chapter in the book Carte Blanche, the Stories Behind the Stories by Jessica Pitchford, dealing with 25 years of the history of this South African M-Net television program, has been devoted to the story of his death.

His work includes two documentaries on the devastation and desertification of Africa – the 1986 film The End of Eden and the shorter "The Frightened Wilderness" of 1984.

The ROSCAR award for the environmental conservation campaign is dedicated in the name of Rick Lomba. Lomba's wife, Brita wishing for his work to go unforgotten, has donated his entire library of work to the African Environmental Film Foundation.

== Works ==
- Botswana : environmental policies and practices under scrutiny : the Lomba archives / D. Williamson, photography by Rick Lomba and the African Images Photographic Library. Kalk Bay, Lindlife Publishers, c1994. English, ISBN 1875027017
- The Frightened Wilderness – Documentary Film 1984
- The End of Eden – Documentary Film 1986
