= Surplus: Terrorized into Being Consumers =

Surplus: Terrorized Into Being Consumers
- Directed by: Erik Gandini
- Written by: Erik Gandini
- Produced by: Erik Gandini
- Cinematography: Lukas Eisenhauer Carl Nilsson
- Edited by: Johan Söderberg
- Music by: David Österberg; Johan Söderberg
- Release date: 21 November 2003
- Running time: 54 min. (approx.)
- Country: Sweden
- Languages: Swedish; Spanish; English

Surplus: Terrorized Into Being Consumers is a 2003 Swedish documentary film on consumerism and globalization, created by director Erik Gandini and editor Johan Söderberg. It looks at capitalism and technology, exploring arguments that their promises have not been fulfilled, and never will be. The film features explanations of anarcho-primitivist ideology, alongside calls for a "simple and fulfilling life".

== Synopsis ==
Opening

- Footage of the protests at the 27th G8 summit in Genoa.
- Fidel Castro gives a speech about consumer society, climate change and destruction of the environment.

John Zerzan

- John Zerzan is interviewed.
- Montage of shopping, hard labour, cities and businesses, overlaid with George Bush speaking: "We cannot let the terrorists achieve the objective of frightening our nation to the point where we don't... where people don't shop."
- RealDoll manufacturer gives a tour of his warehouse, showing the variety and cost of the sex-dolls.
- Zerzan speaks of the promises of technology for closer connection and more free time. Bill Gates says: "The computer will be the very best tool for letting people socialize with each other. This is certainly a tool that can bring people together, more than isolate them." Zerzan calls to dismantle everything that separates us from the natural world. "It's destroying everything and it just has to go."

Cuba

- Mirta Muñes shows the Cuban ration card and Cuban toothpaste, without brand labelling. Various Cubans describe a diet of "rice and beans".
- Parade before a speech by Fidel Casto. Castro approaches the pulpit.
- Tania speaks of her excitement of having travelled outside Cuba, amazed by TV, supermarkets, McDonald's, and having gained a lot of weight.
- "Rice and beans" montage.

Internet

- Internet-wealthy Svante says he hates money, feels empty. John Zerzan on emptiness in consumer society.
- Steve Ballmer's "monkey boy" dance and exclamation, "I love this company", at a Microsoft corporate conference, intermixed with workers in offices and factories stretching. Then, Fidel Castro speaking to a crowd of gathered supporters, lip-synched to Ballmer's "I love this company".
- Footage from Alang, India, where 40,000 workers scrap ships to recycle steel.
- John Zerzan speech saying violent protesting is better than peaceful protesting, intermixed with a car show, and protesting.

New Ethic

- John Zerzan says corporate property of Starbucks or similar is the main target of his criticism due to being understood as destructive and wiping out freedom and diversity. Footage of "primitive man". Footage of landfills.
- A conclusion, narrated ironically over clips of world leaders, explains a coming paradigm shift in which people will not want corporate products and instead desire a simple, fulfilling life. Tania in Cuba says: "I want something else." The narrator calmly repeats: "A simple, fulfilling life."

== Themes ==
Interviews with anarcho-primitivist John Zerzan are featured prominently.

=== Talking Heads ===
- John Zerzan, anarcho-primitivist writer, editor of Against Civilization: A Reader (1998)
- Kalle Lasn, from Adbusters
- Svante Tidholm, from Stockholm, Sweden, a wealthy web-designer of Spray and author of the autobiographical novel Loser (Wahlström & Widstrand, 1998, Swedish)
- Carlo Giuliani, activist and anarchist killed during Anti-G8 demonstrations in Genoa, 2001

=== World leaders ===
- George W. Bush, President of the United States
- Fidel Castro, President of Cuba
- Steve Ballmer, CEO of Microsoft from 2000 to 2014
- Bill Gates, Chairman of the Board and Chief Software Architect of Microsoft

== Production ==
Director Erik Gandini explained the context behind the film's production: "I don't want to send messages, and I don't take sides. I'm a filmmaker, I'm interested in understanding issues that are of interest to everyone. I was in Genoa at the G8, they burned my Fiat 500, and I tried to understand why someone had done it." He said: "When I returned to Sweden, I found that the Gothenburg protests in March were still being discussed, but, as here, always from the perspective of public order."

=== Style ===
Surplus uses many montages. It overtly uses lip-synching to put words in the mouth of people who hold similar or contrasting positions of world power. Examples of this are George W. Bush speaking for Adbusters, and Fidel Castro mouthing the words of Microsoft CEO Steve Ballmer: "I love this company! Yeah!"

=== Soundtrack listing ===
- Gotan Project - Triptico
- Tosca - Orozco
- Aphrodelics - Aphrodelics – Rollin' on Chrome (Wild Motherfucker dub)
- Marc O´Sullivan (The Mighty Quark) - Smokescreen
- Marc O´Sullivan (The Mighty Quark) - Theme from Good People
- Johan Söderberg and David Österberg - No-tech-no
- Johan Söderberg and David Österberg - Rice&Beans
- Johan Söderberg and David Österberg - 18 Miljener

== Locations ==
- Genoa, Italy - 27th G8 summit (2001)
- Shanghai, China - Stock Exchange
- Alang, India - Metal reclaiming
- United States / Cuba / Hungary / Sweden / Canada

== Reception ==
In il manifesto, Nicola Falcinella wrote that Surplus "offers spectacle and investigation" of an era when "the globalization of consumer society is under attack", and said that it "combines images and music with great rhythm and technical expertise without turning them into a long video clip". Adbusters magazine called Surplus "an open declaration of war on terror".

Presenting the film with the Silver Wolf Award, the jury of the 2003 International Documentary Film Festival Amsterdam said:

This film about consumerism totally consumed us. It used the language of music video, propaganda and commercial advertising as a response to the forces of globalisation. It fights fire with fire. The questions it raises are ultimately more important than any answers it might suggest. And we believe audiences can only profit from the debate that will ensue. For its originality, sense of humour, irony, forcefulness and visual virtuosity, the Silver Wolf Award goes to SURPLUS.

=== Awards ===
- IDFA Silver Wolf Award for Best Mid-Length Documentary, 2003.
