= Alan Carter (philosopher) =

English philosopher (born 1952)

Alan Brian Carter
- Born: 1952 (age 73–74); Lincolnshire, England
- Occupations: Academic, philosopher

Academic background
- Education: University of Kent; University of Sussex; St Cross College, Oxford (DPhil)

Academic work
- Institutions: University College, Dublin; Heythrop College, London; University of Colorado, Boulder; University of British Columbia; University of Bucharest; University of Glasgow
- Main interests: Political philosophy, moral philosophy, environmental philosophy

Alan Brian Carter (born 1952) is Emeritus Professor of Moral Philosophy at the University of Glasgow.

== Thought ==
Some of Carter's work in environmental philosophy is discussed critically by Robin Attfield. Carter's state-primacy theory has been discussed by Robyn Eckersley and criticized by John Barry. and, most fully, by Simon Hailwood. Carter has responded by arguing that his critics fail to take sufficiently into account the problems the military causes in modern societies: "it is telling how little attention green liberal critics of the state-primacy theory have paid to the role of the military and to its highly distorting effects. Failing to examine in any detail military requirements within ostensibly 'liberal democracies', whether existing or imagined, is more like simply ignoring an argument rather than answering it."

Carter was one of the founder members of the London-based Anarchist Research Group. Colin Ward has described Carter, with Murray Bookchin, as one of the leading eco-anarchist thinkers.

== Publications ==
Carter's publications include over 50 articles in academic journals and he is the author of 3 books:

- A Radical Green Political Theory. New York: Routledge. 1999. ISBN 978-0-415-20309-8. (1999)
- The Philosophical Foundations of Property Rights. Hemel Hempstead: Harvester, Wheatsheaf. 1989. ISBN 978-0-7450-0518-8. (1988)
- Marx: a Radical Critique. Prentice Hall / Harvester Wheatsheaf. 1988. ISBN 978-0-7450-0488-4. (1987)

=== Selected articles ===
- "A Solution to the Purported Non-Transitivity of Normative Evaluation," Journal of Philosophy 112, 1 (2015): 23-45
- "A distinction within egalitarianism," Journal of Philosophy 108, 10 (2011): 535–54
- "Anarchism: some theoretical foundations," Journal of Political Ideologies 16, 3 (2011): 245-264
- "Beyond primacy: Marxism, anarchism and radical green political theory," Environmental Politics 19, 6 (2010): 951-972
- "The problem of political compliance in Rawls's theories of justice: Parts I and II," The Journal of Moral Philosophy 3, 1 (2006): 7–21 and 3, 2 (2006): 135–157
- "A defense of egalitarianism," Philosophical Studies 131, 2 (2006): 269–302
- "Some Theoretical Foundations for Radical Green Politics," Environmental Values 13, 3 (2004): 305–28
- "Saving nature and feeding people," Environmental Ethics 26, 4 (2004): 339–60
- "Value-pluralist egalitarianism," Journal of Philosophy 99, 11 (2002): 577–99
- "Can we harm future people?" Environmental Values 10, 4 (2001): 429–454
- "Humean nature," Environmental Values 9, 1 (2000): 3–37
- "Analytical anarchism: some conceptual foundations," Political Theory 28, 2 (2000): 230–53
- "In defense of radical disobedience," The Journal of Applied Philosophy 15, 1 (1998): 29–47
- "Towards a green political theory" in Andrew Dobson and Paul Lucardie (eds.), The Politics of Nature: Explorations in Green Political Theory (London: Routledge, 1993), pp. 39–62

== See also ==
- Anarchism in the United Kingdom
