= Community activism in Eugene, Oregon =

Eugene has a long history of community activism, civil unrest, and protest activity. Eugene's cultural status as a place for alternative thought grew along with the University of Oregon in the turbulent 1960s, and its reputation as an outsider's locale grew with the numerous anarchist protests in the late 1990s. According to the Chicago Tribune, the city was called a "cradle to [the] latest generation of anarchist protesters." Occupy Eugene was home to one of the nation's longest-lasting Occupy protests in 2011, with the last protester leaving the initial Occupy camp on December 27, 2011. The city received national attention during the summer of 2020, after Black Lives Matter protests in response to the murder of George Floyd grew violent.

== 1960s: Counterculture and campus protests ==
Already a counter-culture haven, Eugene felt the change of the 1960s in a heavy way, with underground groups carrying out bombings on military targets. In September 1967, the Eugene Naval & Marine Corps Reserve Training Center was damaged by a series of explosions and fire, and in November 1967, a bomb exploded at the Air Force ROTC building. On Sept 30, 1968, unknown anti-capitalists exploded firebombs at the Eugene Armory, causing over $100,000 in damage (approximately $741,000 in 2020), destroying multiple trucks and Jeeps and dealing significant destruction to the city's equipment compound. Unrest continued throughout 1969 as well, with frequent dynamite attacks on local businesses, newspapers, and Emerald Hall on the University of Oregon campus.

Student activism at the university shaped both campus and Eugene life during the times of social upheaval. Protests at the University of Oregon were the most intensely heated against the Oregon chapter of the ROTC, which was the embodiment of the war effort in Vietnam and Cambodia. The UO chapter of Students for a Democratic Society formed in 1965 but came to the forefront of campus activity in 1969, when they first led students to march and demand the removal of campus ROTC. On January 6, 1970, campus demonstrators threw animal blood onto tables at an ROTC recruitment event in order to draw attention to the barbaric war in Vietnam. Students held a public "People's Trial" of campus president Robert D. Clark, finding him guilty for "complicity in the actions of U.S. imperialism" by enabling the Oregon ROTC to have a presence on campus.

Throughout January and February 1970, anti-war student activists disrupted ROTC events and demonstrated against the war presence, culminating in unknown perpetrators setting the University of Oregon ROTC building on fire in Esslinger Hall, causing massive damage and destroying draft records of university students. In March, 150-200 students, led by the campus SDS chapter, attempted to gain entry to McArthur Court for a concert, setting off a riot that resulted in the arrest of 5 students. The UO faculty voted for ROTC remaining on campus, leading to about 100 students ransacking the ROTC building, breaking furniture, windows, and throwing rocks at the property, to which the police used tear gas on campus demonstrators for the first time.

On April 26, 1970, students closed 13th Avenue through the university by erecting barricades on either end, calling it "People's Street". This protest successfully forced the Eugene City Council to hold hearings on restricting the street to non-automobile traffic, which passed and soon went into effect. On October 2, 1970, unidentified perpetrators exploded a bomb in Prince Lucien Hall, causing $75,000 in damage (approximately $511,000 in 2020).

== 1990s: Anarchist activity ==
Eugene's constant ability for protest capabilities were made clear at the beginning of the decade. In January 1991, a downtown student-led protest against the Gulf War drew 1,500 people and resulted in the arrest of 51, including 15 juveniles. The Baltimore Sun reported, "Protesters carried a 10-year-old girl inside a body bag to the front door of the federal building as a symbol of war's innocent deaths." After the demonstration, a fire was set at a Eugene Marine Corps recruiting station.

Attempts by the city to remove a forest grove at downtown Broadway and Charnelton were met with protests on June 1, 1997. Forty trees in downtown Eugene were cut down to make way for a housing, retail, and parking project and were met with community resistance. The Eugene force was accused of overreaction and excessive use of force for their flagrant use of pepper spray, which was defended by Republican mayor Jim Torrey. In the Whitaker District, citizens were further radicalized by the incident and helped spur the activist community, which was already burgeoning due to a lack of affordable housing and growing income inequality in the area.

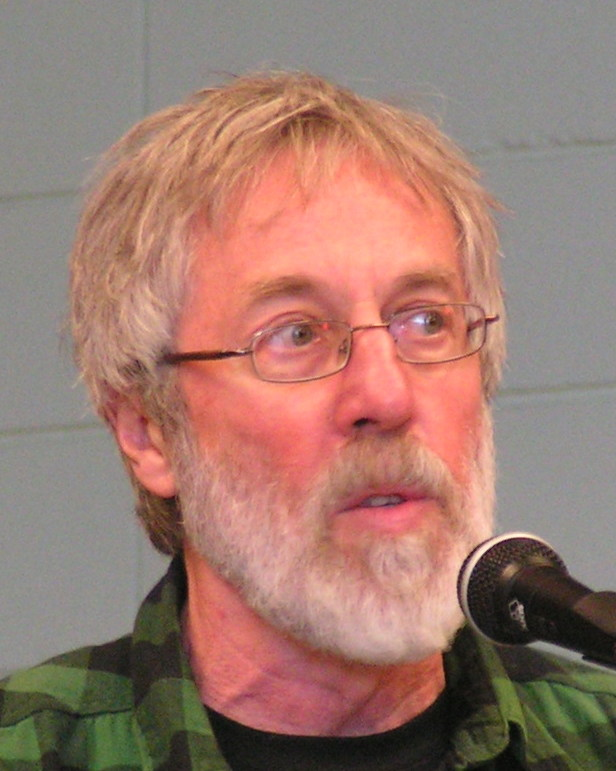
John Zerzan, of Eugene, is an influential figure in the green anarchist movement

On June 18, 1999, several months before the 1999 Seattle WTO protests, Eugene was home to a predecessor riot. Following a two-day conference at the University of Oregon about the dissolution of the country's economic system, a rally against global capitalism enveloped the streets of the downtown area. After the rally, protesters turned to the streets, stopping traffic, burning flags, and smashing windows and electronic equipment. After police responded with tear gas and pepper spray, protesters battled with police for several hours. The tear gas used by the Eugene police affected over 100 people, and 15 were arrested. Later that year, Eugene activists also played a key role in conjunction with other anarchists in organizing black bloc tactics during the World Trade Organization Ministerial Conference of 1999 protest activity. Eugene police subsequently stated that local anarchists were responsible for other attacks on local police officers. Local activists in turn argued that police needlessly harassed individuals wearing black clothing in response.

Mayor Jim Torrey declared Eugene to be the "Anarchist Capital of the United States" in response to the riots, which some embraced. Seattle police chief Norm Stamper in his resignation speech after the 1999 WTO protests blamed the majority of the unrest on "Eugene anarchists". Influential thinkers in Eugene's scene at the time included John Zerzan, an author known for his contributions to leftist theory and who was an editor for Green Anarchy, an anarchist magazine based in the city. Anarchists and leftists continued to protest against Torrey throughout his tenure, including gathering each June 1 (the anniversary of the Broadway Place confrontations) to protest against police brutality committed under his control.

== 21st century unrest ==
The more visible anarchist scene seemed to have died down after an upswing of several years, but protest activity still remained in Eugene. Groups such as the Neighborhood Anarchist Collective still maintained an active grassroots network, and the Eugene Share Fair has been used as a resource for organizations to market support. On June 16, 2000, environmental activists set fire to trucks at a car dealership on Franklin Boulevard. On the one-year anniversary of the 1999 riots, police again attacked demonstrators, arresting 37 and striking a KLCC reporter on the head with a baton. Later, while anarchism took a backseat, Eugene's reputation as a potent leftist center increased as overall political support in the city swung liberally.

=== Occupy Eugene ===
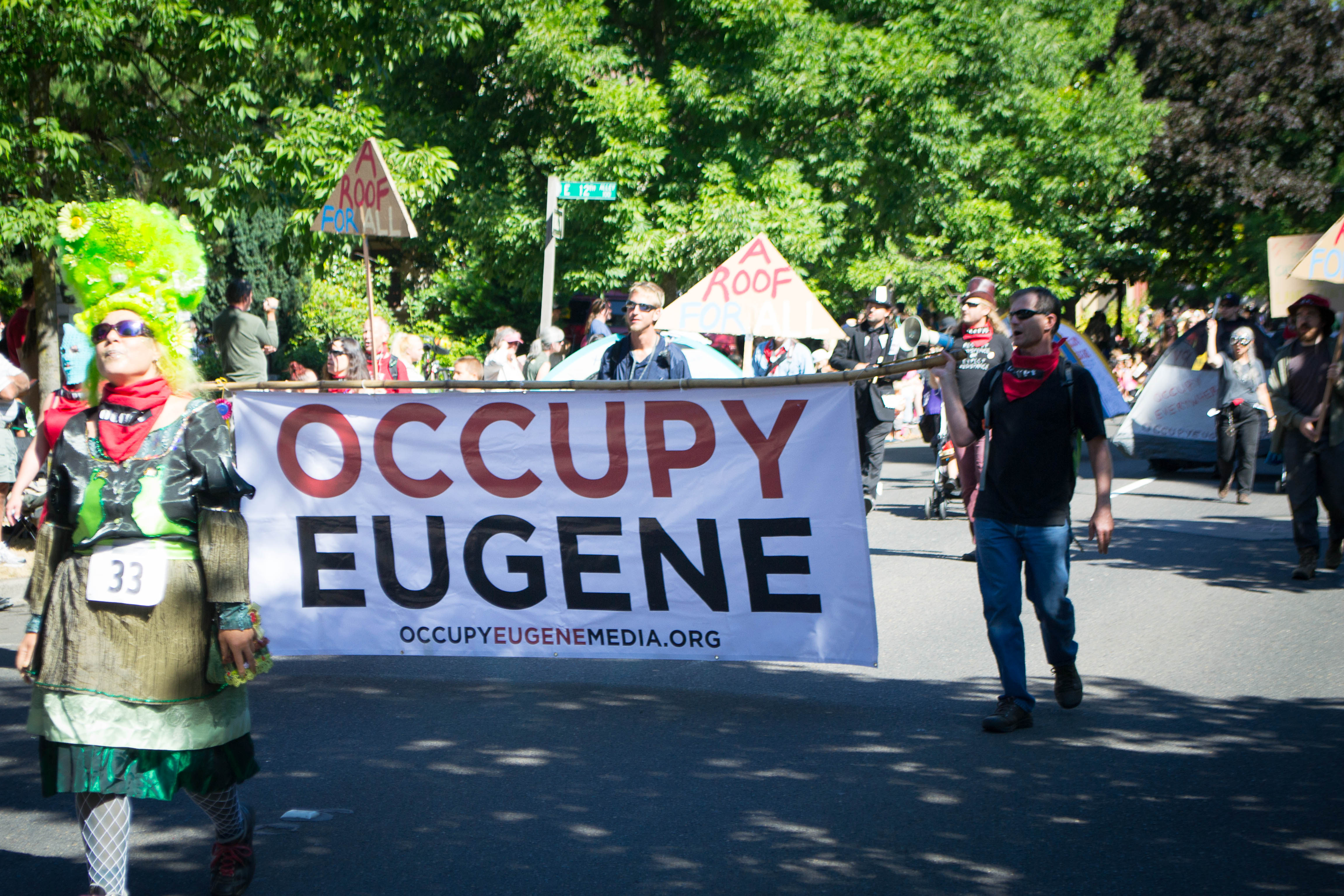
Occupy Eugene Movement at the Eugene Celebration Parade, August 2012

The Occupy Eugene protests grew out of the Occupy Wall Street movement which began in New York City on September 17, 2011. The Eugene protesters were concerned about fairness issues regarding wealth-distribution, banking regulation, housing issues and corporate greed. The first protest march was held on October 15, 2011, and the main encampment, located in Washington Jefferson Park lasted until December 2011. The initial Occupy Eugene demonstrations had over 2,000 attendees and began at Wayne Morse Free Speech Plaza.

=== 2020 George Floyd protests ===
Eugene's George Floyd/Black Lives Matter protests grew out of the civil unrest that began in Minneapolis and spread nationwide in May 2020 after the murder of George Floyd, an unarmed Black man, by a Minneapolis police officer.

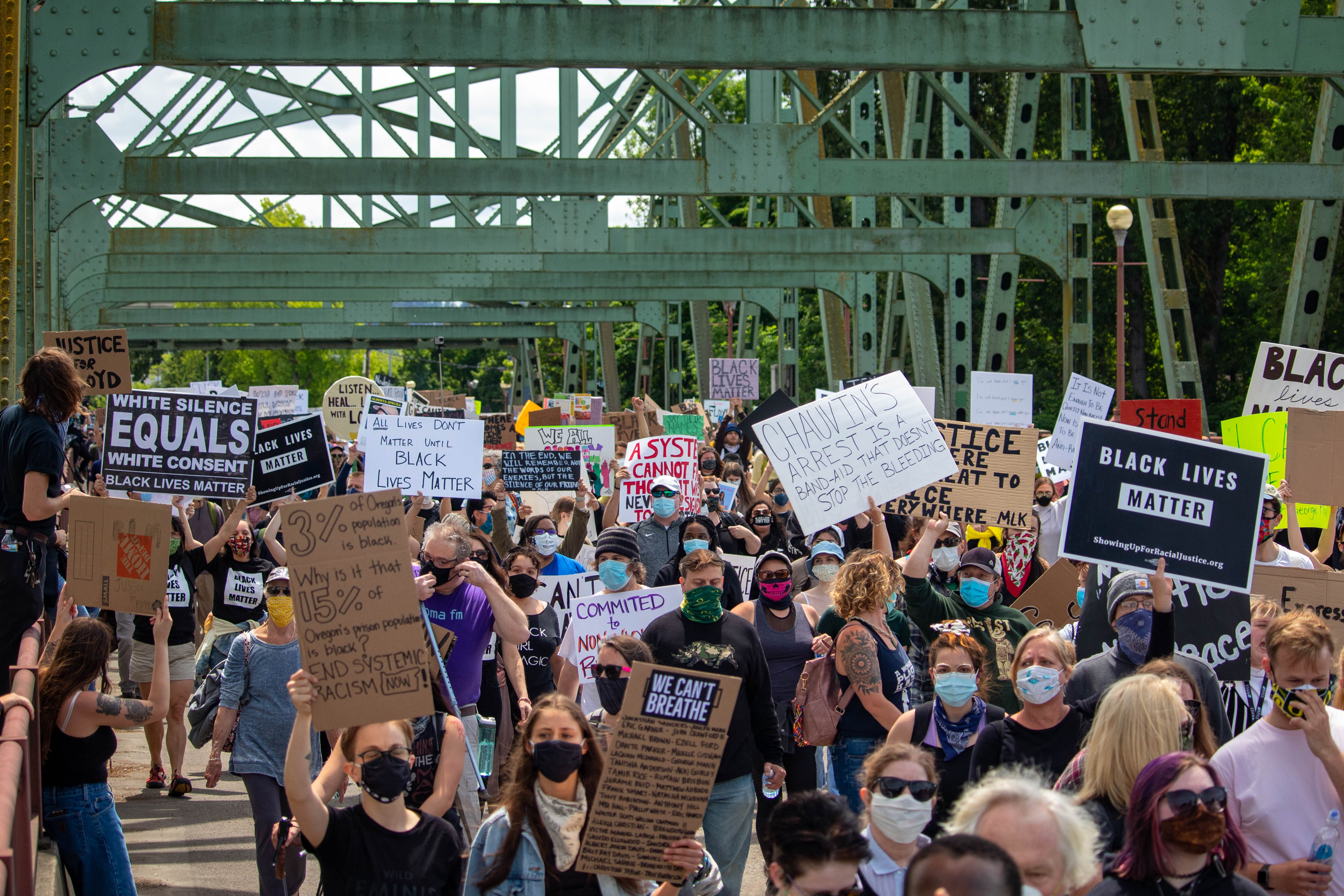
Black Lives Matter protest in Eugene, May 2020

In Eugene, demonstrators turned their attention to surrounding stores on May 29, and disrupted traffic and knocked trash and newsstands into the street in the downtown. Rioters crowded on to Highway I-105 and began setting fire to a nearby road sign. That night, fires were set and windows were smashed. Around 11 p.m., protesters created a bonfire in the street, consisting of traffic cones, newspapers, signs from local businesses, and other items. No arrests were made on that night.

Protests—including marches, rallies, and teach-ins—continued daily for several weeks, re-igniting in response to the insertion of federal troops in Portland.

On June 13 protesters toppled the Pioneer and the Pioneer Mother during a protest of Matthew Deady (controversially the namesake of a University of Oregon building).

Over 2,000 demonstrators attended a Juneteenth Black Lives Matter protest at Alton Baker Park, which was designed to draw revenue to Black-owned businesses.

=== Pro-Palestine demonstrations ===
In 2023 and 2024, many significant demonstrations occurred in and around Eugene as part of international protest against Israel for their genocide of thousands of Palestinians since the beginning of the Gaza war. Beginning with a rally and march on October 21st, 2023 which saw hundreds march through the streets of Eugene. More marches and rallies of similar size would continue in nearly every month from November 2023 to April 2024, organized by a multitude of Eugene activist organizations including socialists, anarchists, liberals and more. In this spirit of organizing in coalition across ideological lines, the Springfield Eugene Anti-Imperialist Coalition (SEAIC) was founded in November 2023 and has been involved in organizing many demonstrations since then.

These demonstrations took place both on the campus of University of Oregon and in the community at large. UO chapters of Students for Justice in Palestine and Jewish Voices for Peace were formed in the wake of these protests and have led the movement on campus for divestment from companies involved in with Israel and its atrocities in Palestine. Campus protests have included marches, rallies, teach-ins, sit-ins, die-ins and more. Students tried to push the UO Board of Trustees to divest from key corporations like Sabra and HP as well as from Jasper Ridge Partners among other demands and were ignored by the board.

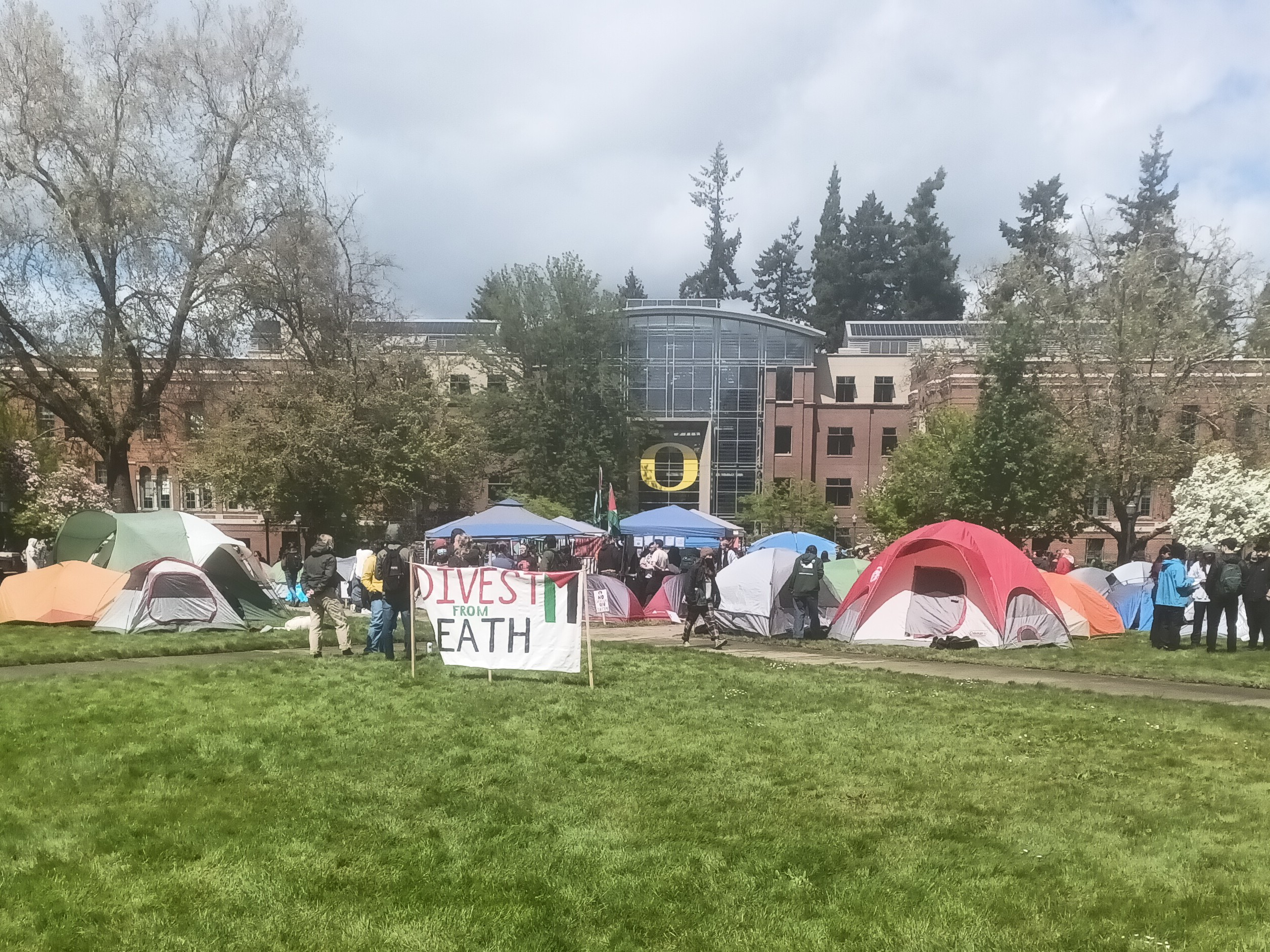
The pro-Palestine "Popular University for Gaza" encampment at the University of Oregon on the Memorial Quad in front of the Lillis Business Complex in April 2024. A sign in front reads "Divest from Death."

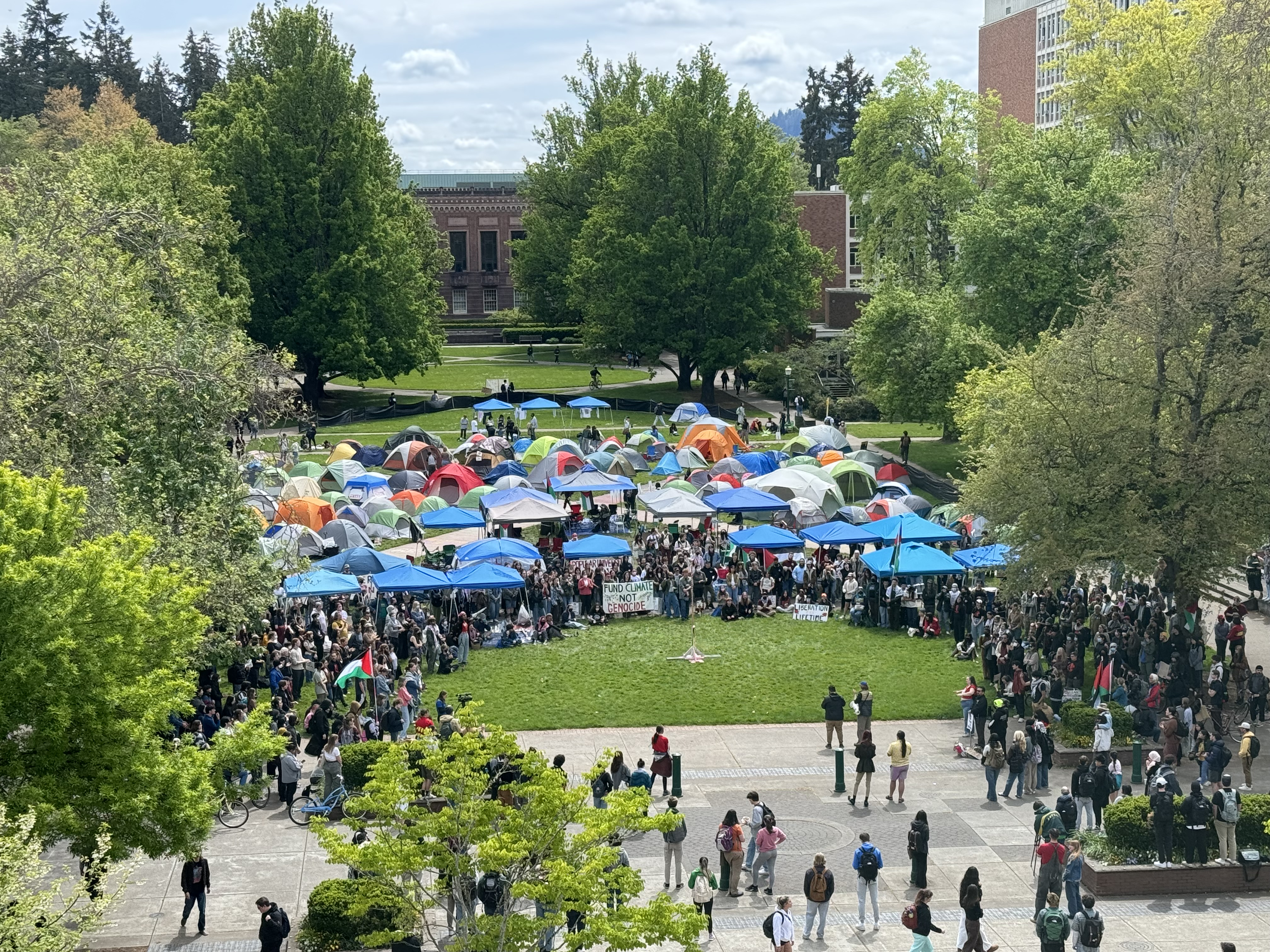
The University of Oregon encampment on May 1, 2024

The 2024 University of Oregon pro-Palestinian campus occupation then began as part of the 2024 pro-Palestinian protests on university campuses which lasted from April 29th to May 23rd, a protest similar to the encampment launched against the Vietnam war over 50 years prior. During this encampment, the students set up their "Popular University for Gaza" on the Memorial Quad in front of the Knight Library and later moved to the space across from Johnson Hall. On May 8th, the ASUO senate passed a BDS resolution that included many student demands. Johnson Hall itself was briefly occupied and rallied at and was recognized as "Alareer Hall" by the students in remembrance of Refaat Alareer, a Palestinian writer and professor who was killed in an Israeli airstrike in northern Gaza in December 2023. Students chained themselves together in front of the hall for 100 hours as part of the protest. The UO students, who banded together by the end of the encampment as the "UO Palestine Coalition" negotiated with UO Administrators for weeks before settling on an agreement which led to the "decamping" in June. The UO Palestine Coalition said the UO President Karl Scholz's message about the agreement did not reflect what they had agreed to, and on May 30th, 2024, around 50 students and community members shut down Scholz's investiture event that formally installed him as University President at Matthew Knight Arena, causing him to shift to a virtual format for it as the students moved outside and threw red paint on the Matthew Knight Arena and a nearby Oregon duck statue.

Another significant demonstration was when more than 50 protesters walked onto the southbound lanes of Interstate-5 just north of the Harlow Road crossing to block traffic on April 15th, 2024 as part of an international day of action against commerce in protest of the ongoing atrocities in Palestine. Over 100 law enforcement officers from 4 agencies (48 Oregon State Police officers, 31 Eugene police officers, 22 Springfield police officers and 20 Lane County Sheriff's deputies) responded and made the largest mass arrests in Eugene history, arresting about 52 people, all initially charged with disorderly conduct. This included at least 3 students from the University of Oregon. Some of the charges were later dropped, but trials against the "Eugene 19" as they dubbed themselves began in September and have continued into 2025, with some already getting disorderly conduct charges, probation and many hours of community service as a consequence.

On October 5th, 2024, a large rally was held at the Old Federal Building in Eugene to commemorate "one year of genocide, one year resistance" as the conflict approached a year. On October 7th, a year to date of the October 7th attack in Israel, another large rally and march was held from Wayne Morse Federal Plaza to University of Oregon which ended with protesters ripping down an Israeli flag and burning it.

In December of 2023, the Eugene City Council approved of a resolution "calling for peace and in opposition to war" which included a call for "continued ceasefire peace talks."

== Environmental activism ==
On October 14, 1996, to commemorate the anniversary of Columbus Day, Earth Liberation Front activists attacked local fast food chains and oil companies. Later that month, ELF protesters destroyed a U.S. Forest Service Ranger Station south of Eugene, causing an estimated damage of $5.3 million. These were some of the first examples of eco-defense in the United States.

In September 2000, members of a Eugene-based cell of the ELF burnt down the Eugene Police Department's West University Public Safety Station. Later, in March 2001, activists attacked the same car dealership on Franklin for the second time in 6 months, damaging more than 30 SUVs. Over 125 different fire attacks were set in the city between 1997 and 2001.

In January 2006, the FBI conducted Operation Backfire, leading to federal indictment of eleven people, all members of ELF. Operation Backfire was the largest investigation into radical underground environmental groups in United States history. Ongoing trials of accused eco-terrorists kept Eugene in the spotlight for a few years.
