= Back to nature =

Lifestyle or philosophy

Back to nature or return to nature is a philosophy or style of living which emphasises closeness to nature, rather than artifice and civilisation. In this, the rustic customs and pastoralism of country life are preferred to urban fashion and sophistication.

At the end of the nineteenth century, a variety of back to nature movements developed in Germany which were collectively known as Lebensreform (life reform). These included naturism and naturopathy.

== Notable exponents ==
- Diogenes and other cynics who advocated the simple, shameless lifestyle of a dog
- Henry David Thoreau, who spent two years living a simple life in a log cabin at Walden Pond
- John Zerzan, an anarcho-primitivist who thinks that symbolic culture such as language is a barrier to the direct experience of nature
- Ted Kaczynski, a mathematician who opposed industrial society as the Unabomber

== See also ==
- Back-to-the-land movement
- Rewilding (conservation biology)
