= Green anarchism =

Branch of anarchism focused on the environment

Green anarchism, also known as ecological anarchism or eco-anarchism, is an anarchist school of thought that focuses on ecology and environmental issues. It is an anti-capitalist and anti-authoritarian form of radical environmentalism, which emphasises social organization, freedom and self-fulfillment.

Ecological approaches to anarchism were first formulated during the 19th century, as the rise of capitalism and colonialism caused environmental degradation. Drawing from the ecology of Charles Darwin, the anarchist Mikhail Bakunin elaborated a naturalist philosophy that rejected the dualistic separation of humanity from nature. This was developed into an ecological philosophy by Peter Kropotkin and Élisée Reclus, who advocated for the decentralisation and degrowth of industry as a means to advance both social justice and environmental protection.

Green anarchism was first developed into a distinct political theory by sections of the New Left, as a revival in anarchism coincided with the emergence of an environmental movement. From the 1970s onwards, three main tendencies of green anarchism were established: Murray Bookchin elaborated the theory of social ecology, which argues that environmental issues stem directly from social issues; Arne Næss defined the theory of deep ecology, which advocates for biocentrism; and John Zerzan developed the theory of anarcho-primitivism, which calls for the abolition of technology and civilization. In the 21st century, these tendencies were joined by total liberation, which centres animal rights, and green syndicalism, which calls for the workers themselves to manage deindustrialisation.

At its core, green anarchism concerns itself with the identification and abolition of social hierarchies that cause environmental degradation. Opposed to the extractivism and productivism of industrial capitalism, it advocates for the degrowth and deindustrialisation of the economy. It also pushes for greater localisation and decentralisation, proposing forms of municipalism, bioregionalism or a "return to nature" as possible alternatives to the state.

== History ==
=== Background ===
Before the Industrial Revolution, the only occurrences of ecological crisis were small-scale, localised to areas affected by natural disasters, overproduction or war. But as the enclosure of common land increasingly forced dispossessed workers into factories, more wide-reaching ecological damage began to be noticed by radicals of the period.

During the late 19th century, as capitalism and colonialism were reaching their height, political philosophers first began to develop critiques of industrialised society, which had caused a rise in pollution and environmental degradation. In response, these early environmentalists developed a concern for nature and wildlife conservation, soil erosion, deforestation, and natural resource management. Early political approaches to environmentalism were supplemented by the literary naturalism of writers such as Henry David Thoreau, John Muir and Ernest Thompson Seton, whose best-selling works helped to alter the popular perception of nature by rejecting the dualistic "man against nature" conflict. In particular, Thoreau's advocacy of anti-consumerism and vegetarianism, as well as his love for the wilderness, has been a direct inspiration for many eco-anarchists.

Ecology in its modern form was developed by Charles Darwin, whose work on evolutionary biology provided a scientific rejection of Christian and Cartesian anthropocentrism, instead emphasising the role of probability and individual agency in the process of evolution. Around the same time, anarchism emerged as a political philosophy that rejected all forms of hierarchy, authority and oppression, and instead advocated for decentralisation and voluntary association. The framework for an ecological anarchism was thus set in place, as a means to reject anthropocentric hierarchies that positioned humans in a dominating position over nature.

=== Roots ===
The ecological roots of anarchism go back to the classical anarchists, such as Pierre-Joseph Proudhon and Mikhail Bakunin, who both conceived of human nature as the basis for anarchism. Drawing from Charles Darwin's work, Bakunin considered people to be an intrinsic part of their environment. Bakunin rejected Cartesian dualism, denying its anthropocentric and mechanistic separation of humanity from nature. However, he also saw humans as uniquely capable of self-determination and called for humanity to achieve a mastery of its own natural environment as a means to achieve freedom. Bakunin's naturalism was developed into an ecological philosophy by the geographers Peter Kropotkin and Éliseé Reclus, who conceived the relationship between human society and nature as a dialectic. Their environmental ethics, which combined social justice with environmental protection, anticipated the green anarchist philosophies of social ecology and bioregionalism.

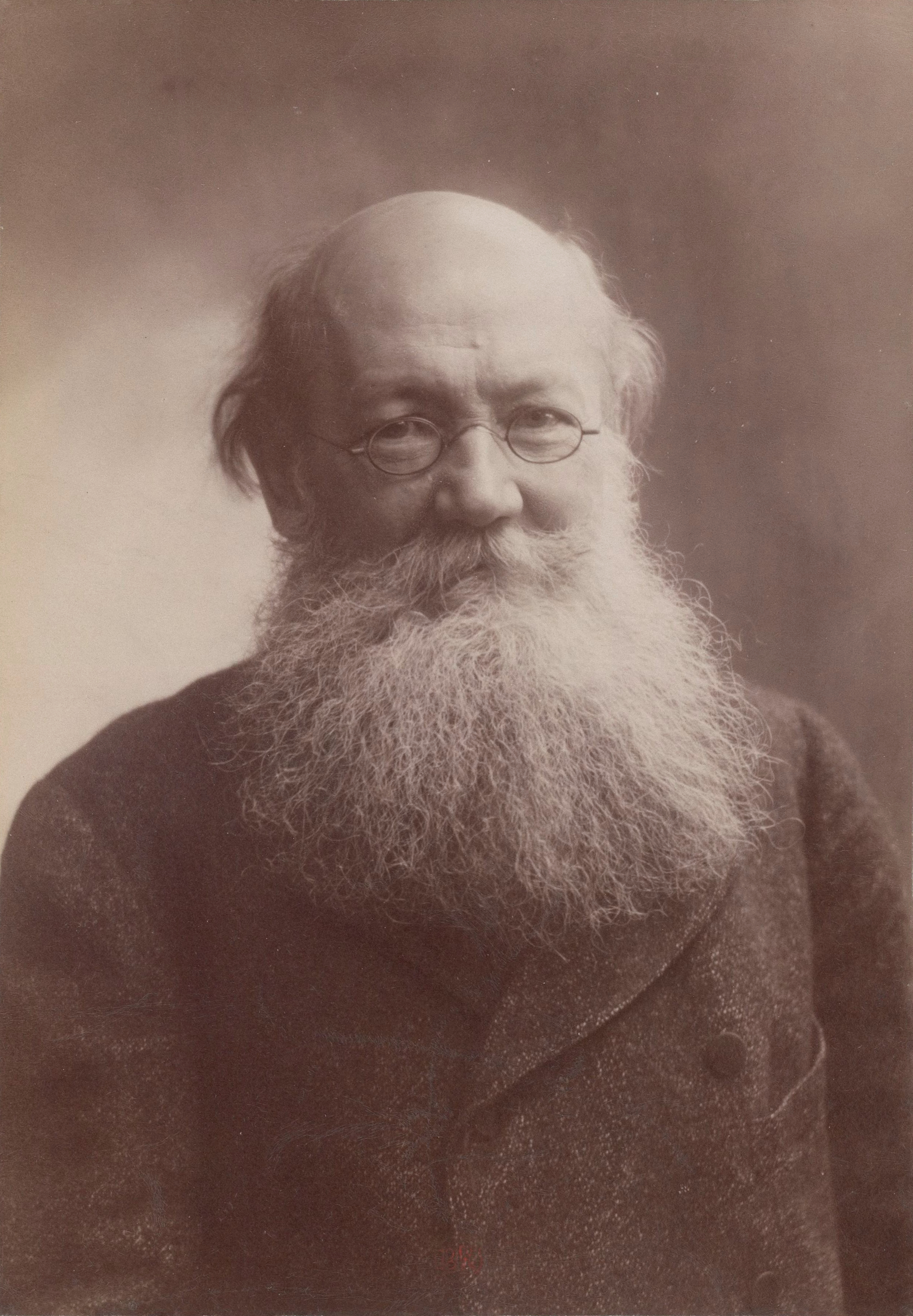
Peter Kropotkin, an early environmentalist figure and a predecessor of the green anarchist tendency

Like Bakunin before him, Kropotkin extolled the domestication of nature by humans, but also framed humanity as an intrinsic part of its natural environment and placed great value in the natural world. Kropotkin was among the first environmentalist thinkers to note the connections between industrialisation, environmental degradation and workers' alienation. In contrast to Marxists, who called for an increase in industrialisation, Kropotkin argued for the localisation of the economy, which he felt would increase people's connection with the land and halt environmental damage. In Fields, Factories and Workshops, Kropotkin advocated for the satisfaction of human needs through horticulture, and the decentralisation and degrowth of industry. He also criticised the division of labour, both between mental and manual labourers, and between the rural peasantry and urban proletariat. In Mutual Aid: A Factor of Evolution, he elaborated on the natural basis for communism, depicting the formation of social organisation among animals through the practice of mutual aid.

Reclus himself argued that environmental degradation caused by industrialisation, exemplified to him by mass deforestation in the Pacific Northwest, was characteristic of the "barbarity" of modern civilisation, which he felt subordinated both workers and the environment to the goal of capital accumulation. Reclus was also one of the earliest figures to develop the idea of "total liberation", directly comparing the exploitation of labour with cruelty to animals and thus advocating for both human and animal rights.

Kropotkin and Reclus' synthesis of environmental and social justice formed the foundation for eco-socialism, chiefly associated with libertarian socialists who advocated for a "return to nature", such as Robert Blatchford, William Morris and Henry Salt. Ecological aspects of anarchism were also emphasised by Emma Goldman and Alexander Berkman, who, drawing from the work of Henry David Thoreau, conceived of anarchism as a means to promote unity between humans and the natural world. These early ecological developments in anarchism lay the foundations for the elaboration of green anarchism in the 1960s, when it was first taken up by figures within the New Left.

=== Development ===
Green anarchism first emerged after the dawn of the Atomic Age, as increasingly centralized governments brought with them a new host of environmental and social issues. During the 1960s, the rise of the environmental movement coincided with a concurrent revival of interest in anarchism, leading to anarchists having a considerable influence on the development of radical environmentalist thought. Principles and practices that already formed the core of anarchist philosophy, from direct action to community organizing, thus became foundational to radical environmentalism. As the threats presented by environmental degradation, industrial agriculture and pollution became more urgent, the first green anarchists turned to decentralisation and diversity as solutions for socio-ecological systems.

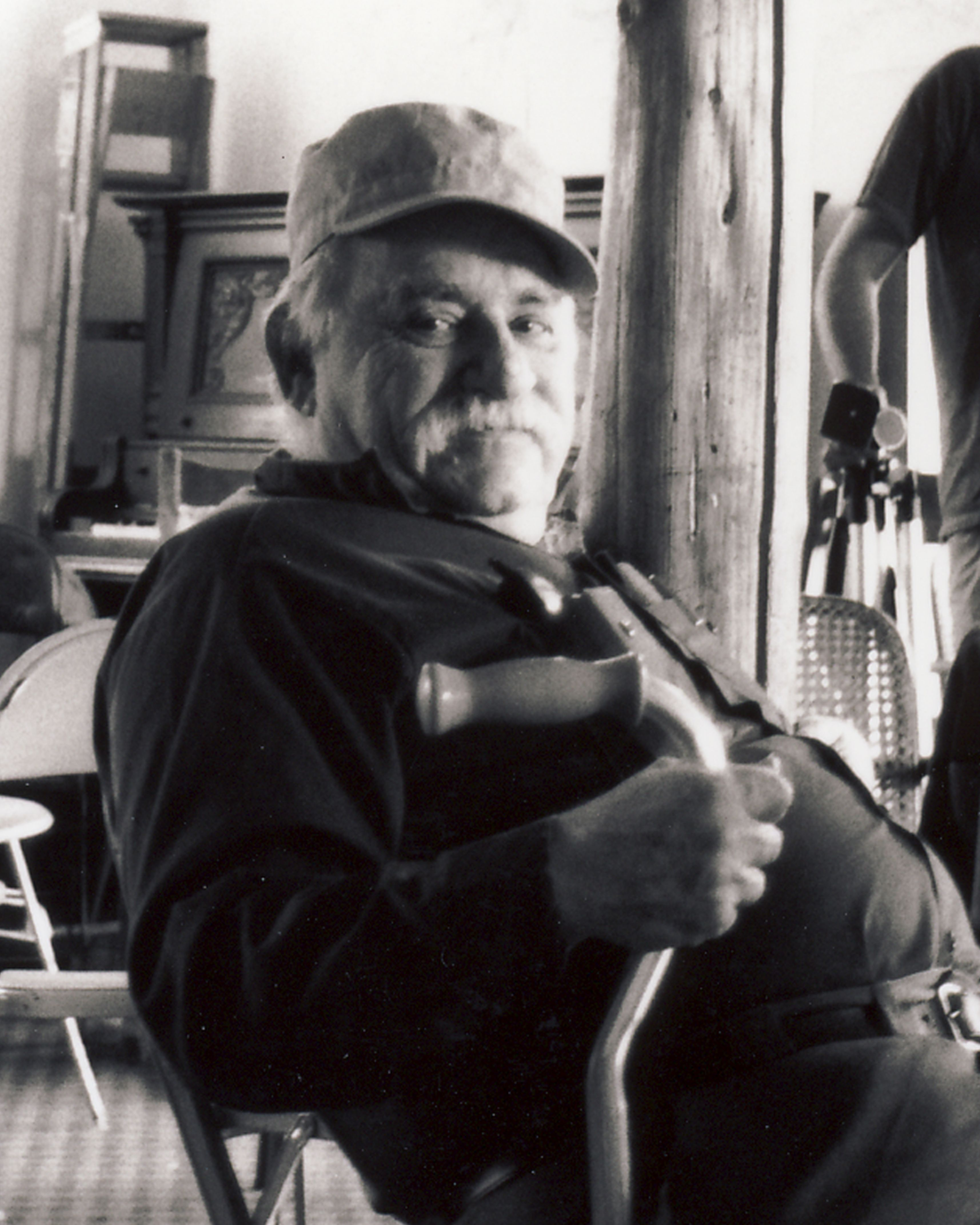
Murray Bookchin, a founding figure of green anarchism and the chief proponent of social ecology

Green anarchism as a tendency was first developed by the American social anarchist Murray Bookchin. Bookchin had already began addressing the problem of environmental degradation as far back as the 1950s. In 1962, he published the first major modern work of environmentalism, Our Synthetic Environment, which warned of the ecological dangers of pesticide application. Over the subsequent decades, Bookchin developed the first theory of green anarchism, social ecology, which presented social hierarchy as the root of ecological problems.

In 1973, Norwegian philosopher Arne Næss developed another green anarchist tendency, known as deep ecology, which rejected of anthropocentrism in favour of biocentrism. In 1985, this philosophy was developed into a political programme by the American academics Bill Devall and George Sessions, while Australian philosopher Warwick Fox proposed the formation of bioregions as a green anarchist alternative to the nation state.

Following on from deep ecology, the next major development in green anarchist philosophy was the articulation of anarcho-primitivism, which was critical of agriculture, technology and civilisation. First developed in the pages of the American anarchist magazine Fifth Estate during the mid-1980s, anarcho-primitivist theory was developed by Fredy Perlman, David Watson, and particularly John Zerzan. It was later taken up by the American periodical Green Anarchy and British periodical Green Anarchist, and partly inspired groups such as the Animal Liberation Front (ALF), Earth Liberation Front (ELF) and Individualists Tending to the Wild (ITS).

=== From theory to practice ===
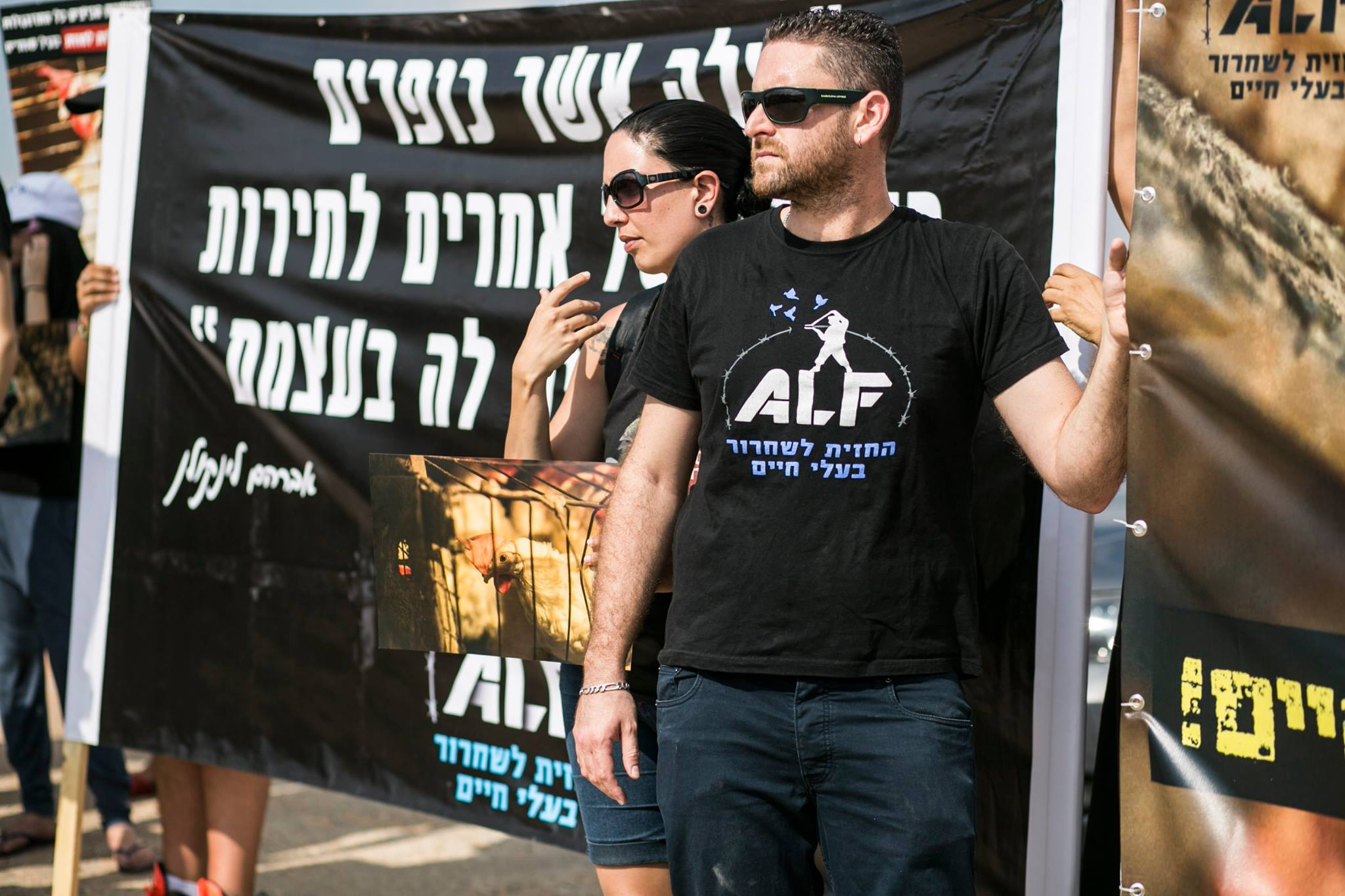
Political demonstration by the Animal Liberation Front (ALF) in Israel

By the 1970s, radical environmentalist groups had begun to carry out direct action against nuclear power infrastructure, with mobilisations of the anti-nuclear movement in France, Germany and the United States providing a direct continuity between contemporary environmentalism and the New Left of the 1960s. In the 1980s, green anarchist groups such as Earth First! started taking direct action against deforestation, roadworks and industrial agriculture. They called their sabotage actions "monkey-wrenching", after Edward Abbey's 1984 novel The Monkey Wrench Gang. During the 1990s, the road protest movements in the United Kingdom and Israel were also driven by eco-anarchists, while eco-anarchist action networks such as the Animal Liberation Front (ALF) and Earth Liberation Front (ELF) first rose to prominence. Eco-anarchist actions have included violent attacks, such as those carried out by cells of the Informal Anarchist Federation (IAF) and Individualists Tending to the Wild (ITS) against nuclear scientists and nanotechnology researchers respectively.

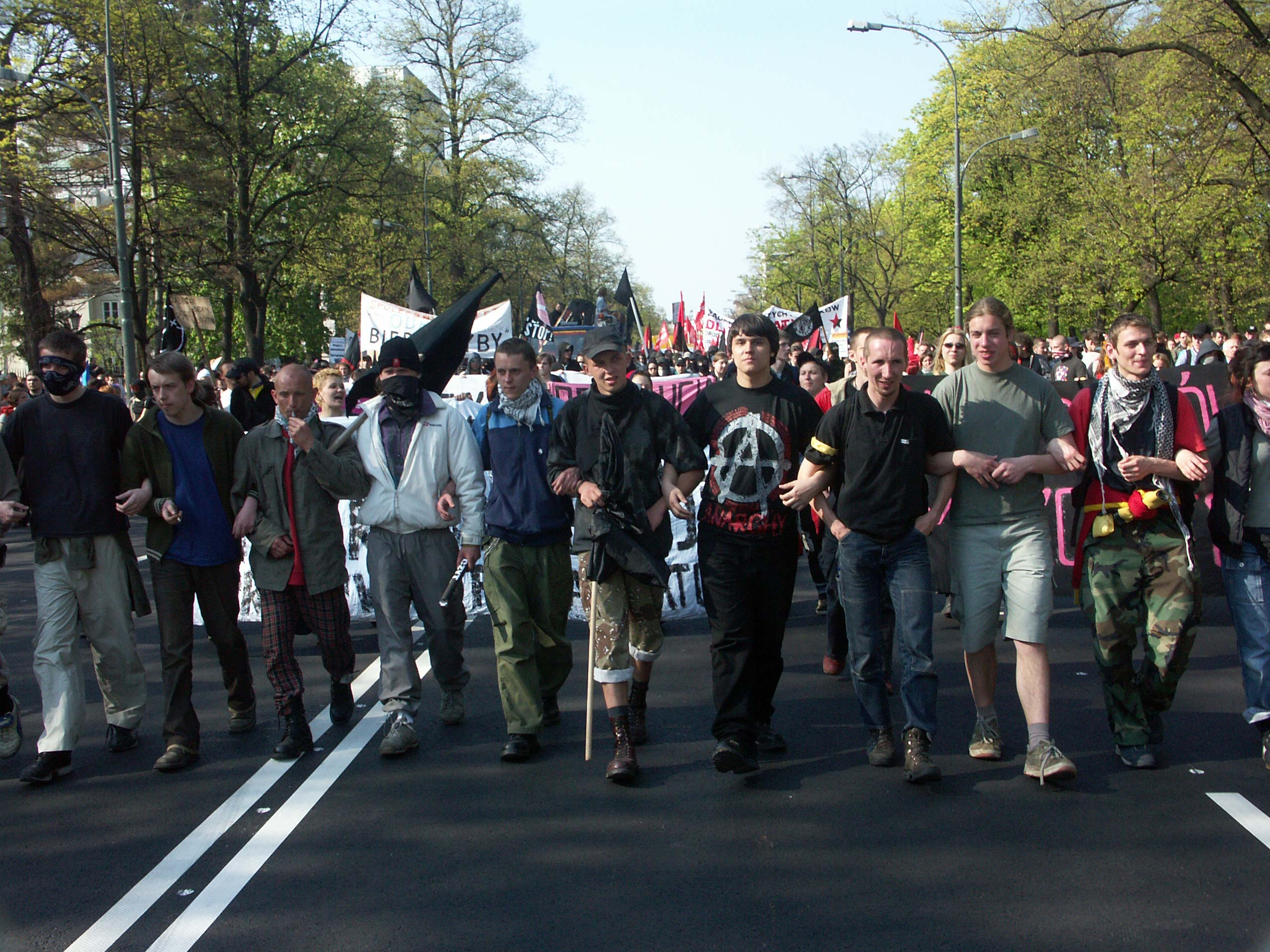
Political demonstration by the anti-globalisation movement (AGM) in Poland

As environmental degradation was accelerated by the rise of economic globalisation and neoliberalism, green anarchists broadened their scope of action from a specific environmentalist focus into one that agitated for global justice. Green anarchists were instrumental in the establishment of the anti-globalisation movement (AGM), as well as its transformation into the subsequent global justice movement (GJM). The AGM gained support in both the Global North and Global South, with the Zapatista Army of National Liberation (EZLN) becoming a key organisation within the movement. It also gained a wide range of support from different sectors of society, not only including activists from left-wing politics or the environmental and peace movements, but also people from trade unions, church groups and the agricultural sector. Trade unionists were the most prominent presence at the 1999 Seattle WTO protests, even outnumbering the environmentalists and anarchists. Drawing from its anarchist roots, the AGM adopted a decentralised and non-hierarchical model of horizontal organisation, embracing new "anarchical" technologies such as the internet as a means to network and communicate. Through the environmental and anti-globalisation movements, contemporary anarchism was ultimately able to achieve a "quasi-renaissance" in anarchist ideas, tendencies and modes of organisation.

=== Contemporary theoretical developments ===
Writers such as Murray Bookchin and Alan Carter have claimed contemporary anarchism to be the only political movement capable of addressing climate change. In his 1996 book Ecology and Anarchism, British anthropologist Brian Morris argued that anarchism is intrinsically environmentalist, as it shared the ecologist principles of decentralisation, non-hierarchical social organisation and interdependence.

By the 21st century, green anarchists had begun to move beyond the previous century's divisions into social ecologist and anarcho-primitivist camps, establishing a new body of theory that rejected the dualisms of humanity against nature and civilisation against wilderness. Drawing on the biocentric philosophy of deep ecology, in 2006, Mark Somma called for a "revolutionary environmentalism" capable of overthrowing capitalism, reducing consumption and organising the conservation of biodiversity. Somma championed a form of solidarity between humanity and the non-human natural world, in a call that was taken up in 2009 by Steven Best, who called for eco-anarchists to commit themselves to "total liberation" and extend solidarity to animals. To Best, morality ought to be extended to animals due to their sentience and capacity to feel pain; he has called for the abolition of the hierarchy between humans and animals, although he implicitly excludes non-sentient plants from this moral consideration. Drawing from eco-feminism, pattrice jones called for human solidarity with both plants and animals, neither of which she considered to be lesser than humans, even describing them as "natural anarchists" that do not recognise or obey any government's laws.

In 2012, Jeff Shantz developed a theory of "green syndicalism", which seeks to use of syndicalist models of workplace organisation to link the labour movement with the environmental movement.

== Branches ==
=== Social ecology ===
The green anarchist theory of social ecology is based on an analysis of the relationship between society and nature. Social ecology considers human society to be both the cause of and solution to environmental degradation, envisioning the creation of a rational and ecological society through a process of sociocultural evolution. Social ecologist Murray Bookchin saw society itself as a natural product of evolution, which intrinsically tended toward ever-increasing complexity and diversity. While he saw human society as having the potential to become "nature rendered self-conscious", in The Ecology of Freedom, Bookchin elaborated that the emergence of hierarchy had given way to a disfigured form of society that was both ecologically and socially destructive.

According to social ecology, the oppression of humans by humans directly preceded the exploitation of the environment by hierarchical society, which itself caused a vicious circle of increasing socio-ecological devastation. Considering social hierarchy to go against the natural evolutionary tendencies towards complexity and diversity, social ecology concludes that oppressive hierarchies have to be abolished in order to resolve the ecological crisis. Bookchin thus proposed a decentralised system of direct democracy, centred locally in the municipality, where people themselves could participate in decision making. He envisioned a self-organized system of popular assemblies to replace the state and re-educate individuals into socially and ecologically minded citizens.

=== Deep ecology ===
The theory of deep ecology rejects anthropocentrism in favour of biocentrism, which recognizes the intrinsic value of all life, regardless of its utility to humankind. Unlike social ecologists, theorists of deep ecology considered human society to be incapable of reversing environmental degradation and, as a result, proposed a drastic reduction in world population. The solutions to human overpopulation proposed by deep ecologists included bioregionalism, which advocated the replacement of the nation state with bioregions, as well as a widespread return to a hunter-gatherer lifestyle. Some deep ecologists, including members of Earth First!, have even welcomed the mass death caused by disease and famine as a form of population control.

=== Anarcho-primitivism ===
The theory of anarcho-primitivism aims its critique at the emergence of technology, agriculture and civilisation, which it considers to have been the source of all social problems. According to American primitivist theorist John Zerzan, it was the division of labour in agricultural societies that had first given way to the social inequality and alienation which became characteristic of modernity. As such, Zerzan proposed the abolition of technology and science, in order for society to be broken down and humans to return to a hunter-gather lifestyle. Libertarian socialists such as Noam Chomsky and Michael Albert have been critical of anarcho-primitivism, with the former arguing that it would inevitably result in genocide.

=== Green syndicalism ===
Green syndicalism, as developed by Graham Purchase and Judi Bari, advocates for the unification of the labour movement with environmental movement and for trade unions such as the Industrial Workers of the World (IWW) to adopt ecological concerns into their platforms. Seeing workers' self-management as a means to address environmental degradation, green syndicalism pushes for workers to agitate their colleagues, sabotage environmentally destructive practices in their workplaces, and form workers' councils. Green syndicalist Jeff Shantz proposed that a free association of producers would be best positioned to dismantle the industrial economy, through the decentralisation and localisation of production. In contrast to Marxism and anarcho-syndicalism, green syndicalism opposes mass production and rejects the idea that the industrial economy has a "liberatory potential"; but it also rejects the radical environmentalist calls for a "complete, immediate break with industrialism".

== Theory ==
Although a diverse body of thought, eco-anarchist theory has a fundamental basis unified by certain shared principles. Eco-anarchism considers there to be a direct connection between the problems of environmental degradation and hierarchy, and maintains an anti-capitalist critique of productivism and industrialism. Emphasising decentralisation and community ownership, it also advocates for the degrowth of the economy and the re-centring of social relations around local communities and bioregions.

=== Critique of civilisation ===
Green anarchism traces the roots of all forms of oppression to the widespread transition from hunting and gathering to sedentary lifestyles. According to green anarchism, the foundation of civilisation was defined by the extraction and importation of natural resources, which led to the formation of hierarchy through capital accumulation and the division of labour. Green anarchists are therefore critical of civilisation and its manifestations in globalized capitalism, which they consider to be causing a societal and ecological collapse that necessitates a "return to nature". Green anarchists uphold direct action as a form of resistance against civilisation, which they wish to replace with a way of simple living in harmony with nature. This may involve cultivating self-sustainability, practising survivalism or rewilding.

=== Decentralisation ===
Eco-anarchism considers the rise of states to be the primary cause of environmental degradation, as states promote greater industrial extraction and production as means to remain competitive with other state powers, even at the expense of the environment. Drawing from the ecological principle of "unity in diversity", eco-anarchism also recognises humans as an intrinsic part of the ecosystem that they live in and how their culture, history and language is shaped by their local environments. Eco-anarchists therefore argue for the abolition of states and their replacement with stateless societies, upholding various forms of localism and bioregionalism.

=== Deindustrialisation ===
Ecological anarchism considers the exploitation of labour under capitalism within a broader ecological context, holding that environmental degradation is intrinsically linked with societal oppression. As such, green anarchism is opposed to industrialism, due to both its social and ecological affects.

== See also ==
- Animal rights and punk subculture
- Chellis Glendinning
- Earth Liberation Front
- Earth First!
- Green Scare
- Eco-socialism
- Intentional community
- Left-libertarianism
- Operation Backfire (FBI)
- Permaculture
- Vulkangruppe

== Bibliography ==
- Aaltola, Elisa (2010). "Green Anarchy: Deep Ecology and Primitivism". In Franks, Benjamin; Wilson, Matthew (eds.). Anarchism and Moral Philosophy. Palgrave Macmillan. pp. 161–185. doi:10.1057/9780230289680_9. ISBN 978-0-230-28968-0.
- Carter, Alan (1999). A Radical Green Political Theory. London: Routledge. ISBN 0-415-20309-0. LCCN 98-41317.
- Carter, Alan B. (2002). "Anarchism/eco-anarchism". In Barry, John; Frankland, E. Gene (eds.). International Encyclopedia of Environmental Politics. Routledge. doi:10.4324/9780203996188. ISBN 9780415202855. LCCN 2001019754.
- Curran, Giorel (2004). "Anarchism, environmentalism, and anti–globalisation". Interdisciplinary Environmental Review. 6 (2) 53924: 37–50. doi:10.1504/IER.2004.053924. ISSN 2042-6992.
- Dunlap, Alexander (2021). "Toward an Anarchist Decolonization: A Few Notes". Capitalism Nature Socialism. 32 (4): 62–72. doi:10.1080/10455752.2021.1879186. S2CID 234082682.
- Edwards-Schuth, Brandon; Lupinacci, John (2023). "Anarchism, EcoJustice, and Earth Democracy". In Lupinacci, John; Happel-Parkins, Alison; Turner, Rita (eds.). Ecocritical Perspectives in Teacher Education. Brill Publishers. pp. 138–157. doi:10.1163/9789004532793_008. ISBN 9789004532793. LCCN 2022046926.
- Gordon, Uri (2009). "Eco-Anarchism". In Ness, Immanuel (ed.). The International Encyclopedia of Revolution and Protest. pp. 1–2. doi:10.1002/9781405198073.wbierp0491. ISBN 9781405198073.
- Hailwood, Simon (2003). "Eco-Anarchism and Liberal Reformism". Ecotheology: Journal of Religion, Nature & the Environment. 8 (2): 224–241. doi:10.1558/ecotheology.v8i2.224. ISSN 1363-7320.
- Hall, Matthew (2011). "Beyond the human: extending ecological anarchism". Environmental Politics. 20 (3): 374–390. Bibcode:2011EnvPo..20..374H. doi:10.1080/09644016.2011.573360. ISSN 1743-8934. S2CID 143845424.
- Holohan, Kevin J. (2022). "Navigating Extinction: Zen Buddhism and Eco-Anarchism". Religions. 13 (60): 60. doi:10.3390/rel13010060. ISSN 2077-1444.
- Marshall, Peter H. (2008) [1992]. Demanding the Impossible: A History of Anarchism. London: Harper Perennial. ISBN 978-0-00-686245-1. OCLC 218212571.
- Mellos, Koula (1988). "Theory of Eco-anarchism: Bookchin's Critique of Authority". Perspectives on Ecology: A Critical Essay. Macmillan Press. pp. 77–107. doi:10.1007/978-1-349-19598-5_5. ISBN 978-1-349-19600-5.
- Morris, Brian (2017). "Anarchism and Environmental Philosophy". In Jun, Nathan (ed.). Brill's Companion to Anarchism and Philosophy. Leiden: Brill. pp. 369–400. doi:10.1163/9789004356894_015. ISBN 978-90-04-35689-4.
- Parson, Sean (2018). "Ecocentrism". In Franks, Benjamin; Jun, Nathan; Williams, Leonard (eds.). Anarchism: A Conceptual Approach. Routledge. pp. 219–233. ISBN 978-1-138-92565-6. LCCN 2017044519.
- Parsons, Jonathan (2018). "Anarchism and Unconventional Oil" (PDF). In Bellamy, Brent Ryan; Diamanti, Jeff (eds.). Materialism and the Critique of Energy. Chicago: MCM Publishing. pp. 547–579. LCCN 2018949294. Archived (PDF) from the original on 25 February 2021.
- Price, Andy (2019). "Green Anarchism". In Adams, Matthew S.; Levy, Carl (eds.). The Palgrave Handbook of Anarchism. Cham, Switzerland: Palgrave Macmillan. pp. 281–291. doi:10.1007/978-3-319-75620-2_16. ISBN 978-3-319-75620-2. S2CID 242090793.
- Radcliffe, James (2016) [2012]. "Eco-anarchism, the New Left and Romanticism". In Rignall, John; Klaus, H. Gustav (eds.). Ecology and the Literature of the British Left: The Red and the Green. Routledge. pp. 193–206. doi:10.4324/9781315578675-15. ISBN 9781409418221. LCCN 2012003109.
- Shahar, Dan C. (2020). "Anarchism for an Ecological Crisis?". In Chartier, Gary; Van Schoelandt, Chad (eds.). The Routledge Handbook of Anarchy and Anarchist Thought. New York: Routledge. pp. 381–392. doi:10.4324/9781315185255-27. ISBN 9781315185255. S2CID 228898569.
- Smessaert, Jacob; Feola, Giuseppe (2023). "Beyond Statism and Deliberation: Questioning Ecological Democracy through Eco-Anarchism and Cosmopolitics". Environmental Values. 32 (6): 765–793. Bibcode:2023EnvV...32..765S. doi:10.3197/096327123X16759401706533. ISSN 1752-7015. S2CID 257854522.
- Taylor, Bron (2013). "Threat Assessments and Radical Environmentalism". Terrorism and Political Violence. 15 (4): 173–182. doi:10.1080/09546550390449962. ISSN 1556-1836. S2CID 143100557.
- Verstraeten, Guido J. M.; Verstraeten, Willem W. (2014). "Eco-refuges as Anarchist's Promised Land or the End of Dialectical Anarchism". Asian Journal of Humanities and Social Studies. 2 (6): 781–788. ISSN 2321-2799.
- Ward, Colin (2004). "Green aspirations and anarchist futures". Anarchism: A Very Short Introduction. Oxford University Press. pp. 90–98. ISBN 978-0-19-280477-8.
- Wiedmann, Thomas; Lenzen, Manfred; Keyßer, Lorenz T.; Steinberger, Julia K. (2020). "Scientists' warning on affluence". Nature Communications. 11 (3107): 3107. Bibcode:2020NatCo..11.3107W. doi:10.1038/s41467-020-16941-y. PMC 7305220. PMID 32561753.
- Williams, Dana M. (2009). "Red vs. green: regional variation of anarchist ideology in the United States". Journal of Political Ideologies. 14 (2): 189–210. doi:10.1080/13569310902925816. S2CID 33888366.
