= Norm Stamper =

Law enforcement official known for 1999 Seattle WTO protest police response

Norman Harvey Stamper
- Born: 1944 (age 81–82); San Diego, California
- Police career
- Department: Seattle Police Department; San Diego Police Department
- Service years: 1966 – March 2000
- Rank: Chief of Police
- Other work: consultant, advisor, writer

Norman Harvey Stamper (born 1944) is an American former chief of police, writer, law enforcement consultant, and advocate for criminal justice reform.

== Biography ==
Stamper is known for his role as Chief of the Seattle Police Department (1994–2000) responsible for Seattle's contested response to the protests of the WTO Ministerial Conference of 1999, which eventually led to his resignation. Stamper has expressed regret about his decisions at the time. When discussing the use of chemical agents such as tear gas Stamper declared it was a mistake and added "the chief in me should have said, 'For the greater good, we ought not to have brought those chemical agents out. We ought not to have, I think, raised the stakes.'" Stamper also blamed outward agents for the failures of his police force, declaring Eugene anarchists committed the majority of the anti-capitalist activism in Seattle.

Stamper was a police officer for 34 years, the first 28 in San Diego before moving to Seattle, and has a doctorate in Leadership and Human Behavior. He has authored articles and op-eds (The New York Times, The New Yorker, Seattle Post-Intelligencer, AlterNet, among others). He has appeared on numerous national television and radio programs, including The Colbert Report, The O'Reilly Factor, and shows hosted by Amy Goodman, Cornel West, Mike Huckabee, and others. He is also a blogger for The Huffington Post.

Since his resignation, Stamper has called for the legalization of all drugs and the case-by-case release of persons incarcerated for nonviolent drug offenses. He serves as an advisory board member for Law Enforcement Against Prohibition as well as the National Organization for the Reform of Marijuana Laws. He has also starred in the documentary The Union: The Business Behind Getting High.

Stamper also serves on the Constitution Project's Death Penalty Committee as well as Death Penalty Focus, organizations working to end executions. He was a founding member of the National Advisory Council on the Violence Against Women Act, and is committed to eradicating domestic violence, child abuse, and sexual assault.

Stamper is the author of Breaking Rank: A Top Cop's Exposé of the Dark Side of American Policing. In 2016, he authored To Protect and Serve: How to Fix America's Police.

In response to the Occupy movement, Stamper has reiterated his regret about how he handled the protests in Seattle, and publicly stated the need to create an alternative to what he termed "the paramilitary bureaucracy that is American policing", stating no change will happen "unless, even as we cull 'bad apples' from our police forces, we recognize that the barrel itself is rotten".
