= John Zerzan =

American philosopher and author (born 1943)

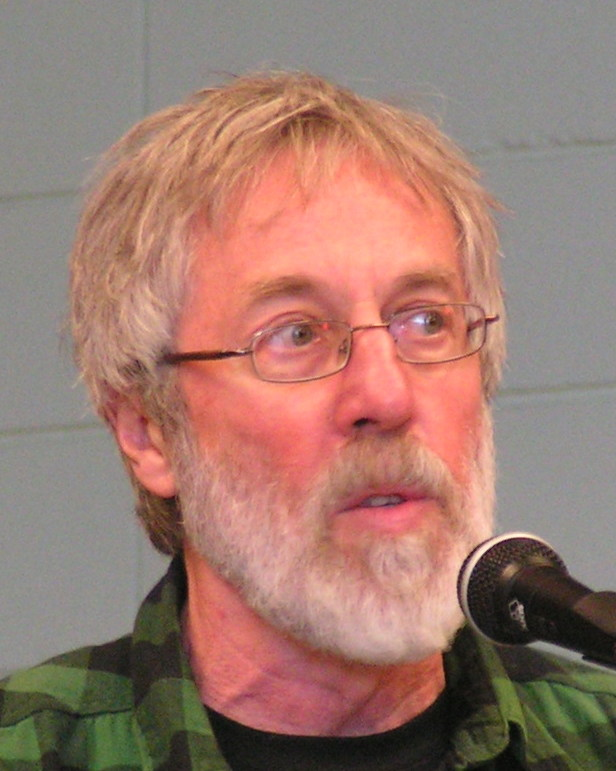
- Zerzan in 2010
- Born: John Edward Zerzan; August 10, 1943 (age 83); Salem, Oregon, U.S.

Education
- Education: Stanford University (BA); San Francisco State University (MA); University of Southern California (attended)

Philosophical work
- Era: Contemporary philosophy
- Region: Western philosophy
- School: Anarcho-primitivism; post-left anarchy
- Main interests: Hunter-gatherer society; civilization; alienation; symbolic culture; technology; mass society
- Notable ideas: Anarcho-primitivism; domestication of humans; rewilding

John Edward Zerzan (/ˈzɜːrzən/ ZUR-zən; born August 10, 1943) is an American philosopher, author and radio host who founded the political philosophy of anarcho-primitivism. His works criticize agricultural civilization as inherently oppressive and advocate drawing upon the ways of life of hunter-gatherers as an inspiration for what a free society should look like. Subjects of his criticism include domestication and symbolic thought, such as language, numbers, art, and the concept of time.

He has written numerous essays and books discussing his philosophy, including his 1994 collection Future Primitive and Other Essays, which is considered a classic among anarcho-primitivists and garnered some mainstream attention in the aftermath of Ted Kaczynski's trial.

== Early life and education ==
John Edward Zerzan was born on August 10, 1943, in Salem, Oregon, and is of Czech and Slovak descent. He received his bachelor's degree in political science from Stanford University in 1966. From 1967 to 1970, Zerzan worked as a union organizer for the Social Service Employees' Union in San Francisco. Zerzan returned to school and received a master's degree in history from San Francisco State University in 1972. He completed his coursework towards a PhD at the University of Southern California but dropped out in 1975 before completing his dissertation.

== Activism ==
In 1966, Zerzan was arrested while performing civil disobedience at a Berkeley anti-Vietnam War march and spent two weeks in the Contra Costa County Jail. He vowed after his release never again to be willingly arrested. He attended events organized by Ken Kesey and the Merry Pranksters and was involved with the psychedelic drug and music scene in San Francisco's Haight-Ashbury neighborhood.

In the late 1960s he worked as a social worker for the city of San Francisco welfare department. He helped organize a social workers’ union, the SSEU, and was elected vice president in 1968, and president in 1969. The local Situationist group Contradiction denounced him as a "leftist bureaucrat".

In 1974, Black and Red Press published Unions Against Revolution by Spanish ultra-left theorist Grandizo Munis that included an essay by Zerzan which previously appeared in the journal Telos. Over the next 20 years, Zerzan became intimately involved with the Fifth Estate, Anarchy: A Journal of Desire Armed, Demolition Derby and other anarchist periodicals. He began to question civilization in the early 80s, after having sought to confront issues around the neutrality of technology and division of labour, at the time when Fredy Perlman was making similar conclusions. He saw civilization itself as the root of the problems of the world and that a hunter-gatherer form of society presented the most egalitarian model for human relations with themselves and the natural world.

Zerzan became more widely known during the trial of Ted Kaczynski. After reading the Unabomber Manifesto, Zerzan went to Colorado to experience the trial and meet with Kaczynski in-between proceedings. The New York Times reporter Kenneth B. Noble took interest in Zerzan's sympathies and published an interview titled "Prominent Anarchist Finds Unsought Ally in Serial Bomber" that raised his national profile. Kaczynski eventually split from Zerzan and the anarcho-primitivists with the belief that leftist causes were a distraction.

Although there are similarities in the views of Zerzan and Kaczynski's Unabomber Manifesto, they are apparently entirely coincidental. A 2021 study by Sean Fleming shows that Kaczynski had not read Zerzan's work until after he submitted the Unabomber Manifesto to New York Times and the Washington Post.

In a 2014 interview, Zerzan stated that he and Kaczynski were "not on terms anymore." He criticized his former friend's 2008 essay "The Truth About Primitive Life: A Critique of Anarchoprimitivism" and expressed disapproval of Individuals Tending Towards the Wild, a Mexican group influenced by the Unabomber's bombing campaign.

In 2014, Zerzan engaged in a public debate against Zoltan Istvan at Stanford University. Zerzan and Istvan hold differing views on technology, with Istvan stating on HuffPost that their views on the subject are polar opposites of each-other. Zerzan is an anarcho-primitivist and therefore considers technology inherently harmful to humanity, animals and nature and Planet Earth more generally. Istvan is a transhumanist and considers technology as a beneficial to humanity, animals and nature and Planet Earth more generally.

Zerzan was associated with the Eugene, Oregon anarchist scene.

=== Radio show ===
One method Zerzan uses to promote his Anarcho-primitivist ideas is with his radio show AnarchyRadio on KWVA at 88.1 FM in Eugene, Oregon and live-streamed worldwide by the station's website with archive recordings of full shows available on John Zerzan's own website. Zerzan's website states that he started the show in 2000 although the recorded archive of shows on the site only goes back to 2006. Zerzan's show airs live on Tuesdays on KWVA at 7pm PST and lasts an hour. Besides Zerzan himself, AnarchyRadio occasionally has a co-host with Zerzan and also fills in for Zerzan entirely when he is on speaking tours. AnarchyRadio is a call-in show and listeners can phone KWVA during the show and talk to the host(s) live. Until 2024, AnarchyRadio aired every Tuesday. Since 2024, AnarchyRadio now only airs on the second and fourth Tuesdays of the month. This new scheduling was introduced unofficially in February with an announcement at the end of the February 27 airing and later became official when Zerzan announced it at the start of the March 26 airing, claiming it was "more manageable" for him at his age of 80 years.

In 2014, AnarchyRadio gained unwanted media attention when it was asserted by the New York Daily News that Adam Lanza, perpetrator of the Sandy Hook Elementary School shooting in 2012, once called the show in December 2011 and spoke to Zerzan live on air. Lanza called during the December 20, 2011 show. The caller gave his name as "Greg" while calling Zerzan. He also disguised his voice while calling as "Greg". During the seven-minute call, Greg talked about the chimpanzee Travis who lived in Lanza's home state of Connecticut and was notorious for an incident in 2009 where he tore off the face of Charla Nash (a friend of Sandra Herold, who kept Travis in her home as a pet) and was shot and killed shortly after 911 was called to house for help. This incident was considered as shocking because Travis was raised by humans his whole life and was very friendly towards them. During the call, Greg said that he was a fan of Zerzan's work and stated that Travis was not "an untamed monster" but was actually "civilized. He was able to integrate into society." One comment by Greg that drew particular attention from media in light of his actions was "I just don't think it would be such a stretch to say that he [Travis] very well could have been a teenage mall shooter or something like that." A day later, someone posted on the online forum Shocked Beyond Belief under the username "Smiggles" about the call to Zerzan. In an interview with TV station KMTR shortly after the call surfaced, Zerzan stated that Greg mentioning shooting "and then again later he ends up doing it, I mean it's just hard to grasp." Zerzan also notes that "it's tough to wrap your mind around, but then when you realize you spoke with the guy or listened to the guy, it's all the more upsetting."

== Thought ==
Zerzan is an anarchist philosopher, and is broadly associated with the philosophies of anarcho-primitivism, green anarchism, anti-civilisation, post-left anarchy, neo-luddism, and in particular the critique of technology.

Zerzan has accused linguist and activist Noam Chomsky of not being a real anarchist, saying that he is instead "a liberal-leftist politically, and downright reactionary in his academic specialty, linguistic theory. Chomsky is also, by all accounts, a generous, sincere, tireless activist -- which does not, unfortunately, ensure his thinking has liberatory value."

Although Zerzan is usually anti-technology, he did make an exception to his typical denunciation of technology for vaccines and more specifically, COVID-19 vaccines. In 2022 in an article for Eugene Weekly, Zerzan noted that he does not believe the conspiracy theories about the COVID-19 mRNA vaccines which claim that they were introduced to force new levels of control and restrictions on the general population and also to spy on them with a microchip in the vaccine. Zerzan claims that many forms of technology have already done each of those things and that many of the conspiracy theorists use smartphones, emails and social media and further claims that many of the freedoms that the conspiracy theorists says are being lost by taking the vaccine have actually already been lost by society at large long before the mRNA vaccines were introduced. Zerzan also notes that he has received hate mail from people who he knows and has worked on "the critique of society, on the crisis and what drives it" and that because of his disapproval of the conspiracy theories, has been denounced by these same people as a "fake anti-authoritarian". Zerzan ends his article by adding that "I'd prefer to live to fight another day", implying he has indeed taken a COVID-19 vaccine.

== Criticism ==
In his essay "Social Anarchism or Lifestyle Anarchism: An Unbridgeable Chasm", Murray Bookchin directed criticism from an anarchist point of view at Zerzan's anti-civilizational and anti-technological perspective. He argued that Zerzan's representation of hunter-gatherers was flawed, selective and often patronisingly racist, that his analysis was superficial, and that his practical proposals were nonsensical.

Aside from Bookchin, several other anarchist critiques of Zerzan's primitivist philosophies exist. The pamphlet "Anarchism vs. Primitivism" by Brian Oliver Sheppard criticizes many aspects of the primitivist philosophy. It specifically rejects the claim that primitivism is a form of anarchism.

Some authors such as Andrew Flood have argued that destroying civilization would lead to the death of a significant majority of the population, mainly in poor countries. John Zerzan responded to such claims by suggesting a gradual decrease in population size, with the possibility of people having the need to seek means of sustainability more close to nature.

Flood suggests this contradicts Zerzan's claims elsewhere, and adds that, since it is certain that most people will strongly reject Zerzan's supposed utopia, it can only be implemented by authoritarian means, against the will of billions.

In his essay "Listen Anarchist!", Chaz Bufe criticized the primitivist position from an anarchist perspective, pointing out that primitivists are extremely vague about exactly which technologies they advocate keeping and which they seek to abolish, noting that smallpox had been eradicated thanks to medical technology.

In an essay called "Anarchism = Zerzan?", socialist economist Michael Albert critiques Zerzan's perspectives on concepts such as language, division of labor, and technology, instead saying that Zerzan's argument rests on these concepts being inherently wrong, instead of, as Albert argues, being neutral concepts that can be utilized morally or immorally.

Noam Chomsky criticized the anarcho-primitivist viewpoint, saying that to end civilization essentially means killing billions of people.

== Selected works ==
=== Books and pamphlets ===
- The Education of an Anarchist: A Memoir. Feral House, 2024.
- When We Are Human: Notes From The Age Of Pandemics, July 2021.
- A People's History of Civilization, April 20, 2018
- Time and Time Again. Detritus Books, 2018.
- Why hope? The Stand Against Civilization. Feral House, 2015.
- Future Primitive Revisited. Feral House, May 2012.
- Origins of the 1%: The Bronze Age pamphlet. Left Bank Books, 2012.
- Origins: A John Zerzan Reader. Joint publication of FC Press and Black and Green Press, 2010.
- Twilight of the Machines. Feral House, 2008.
- Running On Emptiness. Feral House, 2002.
- Against Civilization (editor). Uncivilized Books, 1999; Expanded edition, Feral House, 2005.
- Future Primitive and Other Essays. Autonomedia, 1994.
- Questioning Technology (co-edited with Alice Carnes). Freedom Press, 1988; 2d edition, New Society, 1991, ISBN 978-0-900384-44-8
- Elements of Refusal. Left Bank Books, 1988; 2d edition, C.A.L. Press, 1999.

=== Articles ===
- Telos 141, Second-Best Life: Real Virtuality. New York: Telos Press Ltd., Winter 2007.
- Telos 137, Breaking the Spell: A Civilization Critique Perspective. New York: Telos Press Ltd., Winter 2006.
- Telos 124, Why Primitivism?. New York: Telos Press Ltd., Summer 2002.
- Telos 60, Taylorism and Unionism: The Origins of a Partnership. New York: Telos Press Ltd., Summer 1984.
- Telos 50, Anti-Work and the Struggle for Control. New York: Telos Press Ltd., Winter 1981–1982.
- Telos 49, Origins and Meaning of World War I. New York: Telos Press Ltd., Fall 1981.
- Telos 28, Unionism and the Labor Front. New York: Telos Press Ltd., Summer 1978.
- Telos 27, Unionization in America. New York: Telos Press Ltd., Spring 1976.
- Telos 21, Organized Labor versus The Revolt Against Work: The Critical Contest. New York: Telos Press Ltd., Fall 1974.

== See also ==
- Neotribalism
- Species Traitor, publication where John Zerzan regularly contributes
- Fifth Estate, publication where John Zerzan regularly contributes
- Surplus, a Swedish movie (atmo, 2003) which contains an interview with John Zerzan
