= Green Scare =

US government action against the radical environmental movement

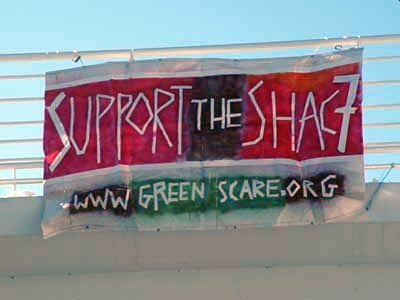
Banner supporting the SHAC 7 and the green scare website.

The Green Scare is a term for legal actions by the US government against the radical environmental movement that occurred mostly in the 2000s. It alludes to the Red Scares, periods of fear over communist infiltration of US society.

The term was popularized by environmental activists. It is first known to have appeared in the wake of the February 12, 2002 congressional hearings titled "The Threat of Eco-Terrorism", which discussed groups including the Earth Liberation Front (ELF) and the Animal Liberation Front (ALF). The spring edition of the prisoner support zine Spirit of Freedom defined the term as "the tactics that the US government and all their tentacles (FBI, IRS, BATF, Joint Terrorism Task Forces, local police, the court system) are using to attack the ELF/ALF and specifically those who publicly support them."

The term has been used by activists to describe a sweep of arrests, convictions and grand jury indictments of ELF and ALF operatives on charges relating to acts of property damage, conspiracy, arson and use of destructive devices.

== Origin of the phrase ==
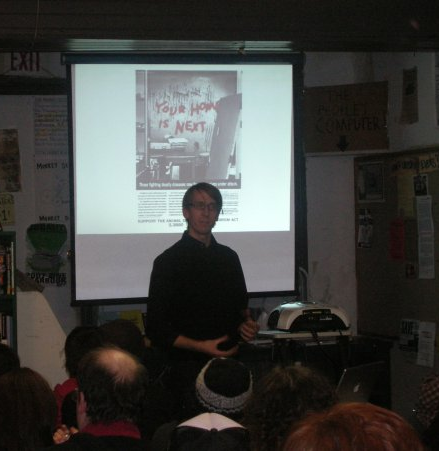
Will Potter presentation at Green Scare Event, Wooden Shoe Books, Philadelphia

Journalist Will Potter first notably used the term 'Green Scare' in his publication Green is the New Red.

== Cases ==
Since 2000, the US government has prosecuted over 20 cases involving environmentalists, which Los Angeles CityBeat claims "redefined not only free speech, but also redefined environmentally motivated property destruction - like torching Hummers or tree-felling equipment." These arrests, indictments and trials, which have collectively been termed the Green Scare by environmentalists, include:

=== Individuals ===
Rod Coronado, a prominent Native American eco-anarchist associated with the Animal Liberation Front, who was arrested on a felony charge of demonstrating the use of a destructive device. His indictment indirectly related to an August 1, 2003 fire in San Diego that destroyed an apartment complex causing an estimated $50 million worth of damage. Coronado, a self-described "unofficial ELF spokesman", stood trial in 2007. After two days of deliberations, the jury remained deadlocked so the judge declared a mistrial. He subsequently entered a guilty plea and accepted a deal for a one-year prison term.

Jeff "Free" Luers, a veganarchist from Los Angeles, California, who served a prison sentence of almost ten years for arson. His initial sentence was over 22 years, but the Oregon Court of Appeals overturned it, and the Lane County Circuit Court determined a new sentence of 10 years in February 2008, after what The Independent described as an "international campaign for a more appropriate sentence for a crime in which no one was hurt." In 2000 he set fire to three SUVs at Romania Chevrolet dealership in Eugene, Oregon as a protest against excessive consumption and global warming. He has become a cause célèbre among some radicals, anti-prison activists, and people associated with the Earth Liberation Front, although Luers has said that he does not consider himself an ELF member. Upon his resentencing, Judge Billings said that he expected Luers would be treated as an "elder statesman" among some activists, and hoped that Luers would use that influence in a productive way. Luers declared that he was looking forward to "promoting activism through legal means."

Christopher McIntosh, who was sentenced to eight years in prison for setting fire to a McDonald's restaurant in Seattle in January, 2003. McIntosh admitted guilt as part of a plea agreement, in which the prosecution said they would not ask that he spend more than ten years in prison. Supporters criticized the sentence as excessive "for someone who caused $5,000 damage". Prosecutors argued it was important to "protect the public" from some one who expressed no remorse, saying McIntosh was "proud of his crime, and, given the chance, he would do the same thing again."

Peter Daniel Young and a friend, Justin Samuel, were indicted by a federal grand jury in September 1998 on four charges of "Extortion by Interfering with Interstate Commerce" and two charges of "Animal Enterprise Terrorism". They released over 8,000 animals from various fur farms in Iowa, South Dakota, and Wisconsin and disposed of the breeding records at each farm. Samuel was arrested on September 4, 1999 in Belgium and was extradited to the United States to face trial. He agreed to cooperate with the government in exchange for a reduced sentence of two years. Young was arrested in San Jose, California on March 21, 2005 on charges of shoplifting from a local Starbucks and was extradited to Wisconsin to face trial for the fur farm raids. He was sentenced to two years in federal prison; 360 hours of community service at a charity; $254,000 restitution; and one year probation.

=== Groups ===
SHAC 7, six animal rights activists, who were found guilty of using their website to incite threats, harassment, vandalism and attacks against the company Huntingdon Life Sciences and their business partners. Originally seven individuals were charged, leading sympathizers to describe the defendants as the SHAC 7, but the case against one of the defendants was dropped. Pamelyn Ferdin, the current president of SHAC USA, told the jury that "for the government to say you can't say this and you can't say that is going down a very scary path of going toward fascism." However, the US Attorney's Office described the convicts as "thugs who went far beyond protected speech and lawful protest to engage in and incite intimidation, harassment and violence." The judge sentenced the individuals to an aggregate of 24 years in prison, and ordered to pay a joint restitution of $1,000,001.00.

Operation Backfire, a multi-agency criminal investigation into destructive acts in the name of animal rights and environmental causes in the United States, that resulted in the December 7, 2005 arrest of seven people. At least six people were subpoenaed to testify before grand juries. Three of the individuals subpoenaed ended up on a January 20, 2006, 65 count, 84-page-long indictment. The new indictment charged 11 people with conspiring to commit 18 acts of arson and vandalism over a 5-year period across multiple states. Some of the charges relate to a 1998 arson attack on the Vail Ski Resort in Colorado and the sabotage of a power line near Bend, Oregon, in 1999. The FBI considered these crimes to be acts of domestic terrorism and the ELF to be the nation's top domestic terror threat.

== Response ==
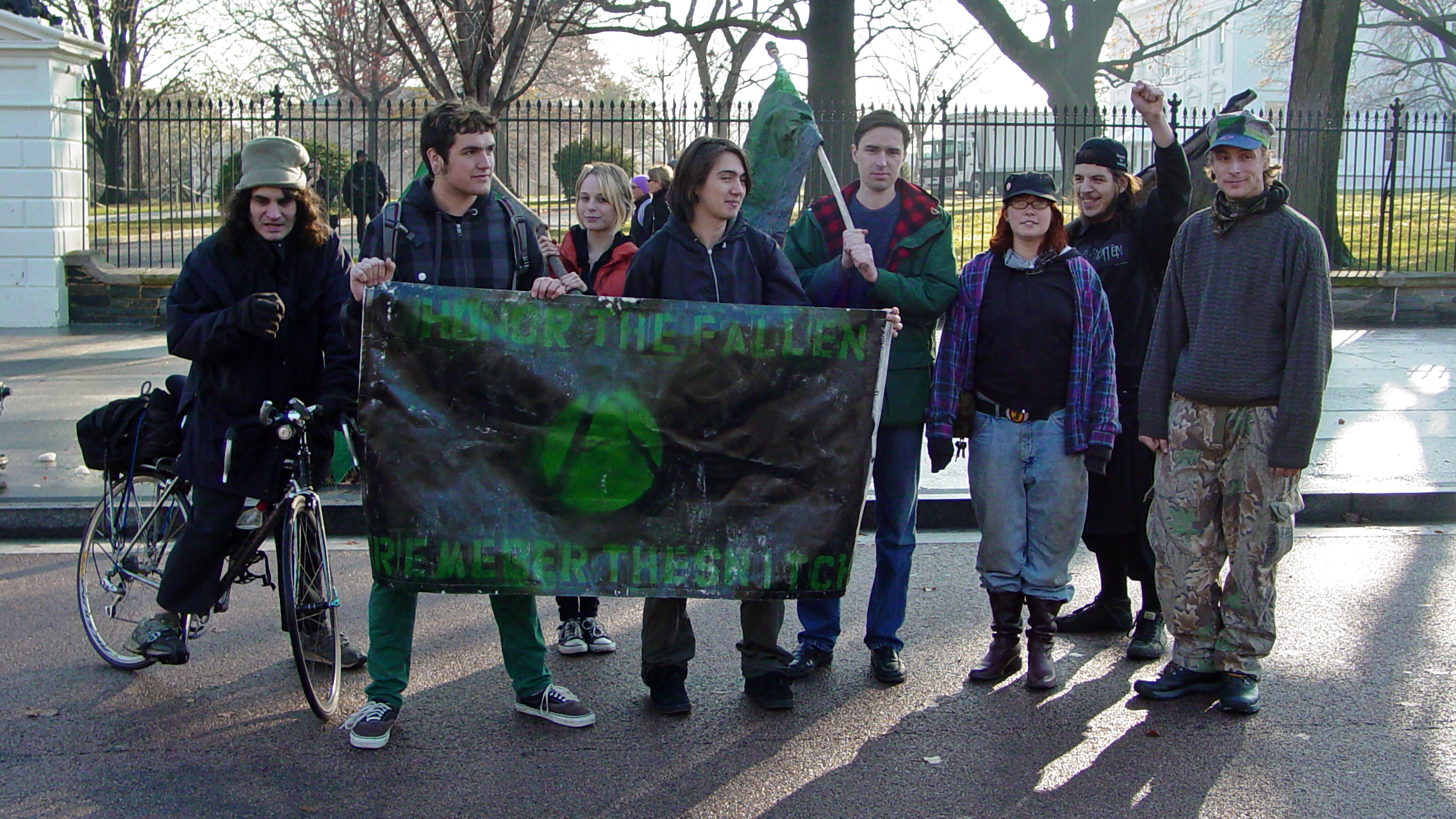
Protests against green scares in the US

The Christian Science Monitor reports that the Operation Backfire indictments have elicited concern from activists that authorities have "cracked the super-secrecy of ALF and ELF". Alternative media organizations have condemned the arrests, some calling them a "witch-hunt", "aimed at disrupting and discrediting political movements". Activists, maintaining the Red Scare allusion, claim the operations are "fishing expedition[s]" carried out "in the midst of 9/11 McCarthyism." The FBI disputed these claims, with former Director Robert Mueller stating in 2006 that the agency takes action "only when volatile talk crosses the line into violence and criminal activity."

== See also ==
- Eco-socialism
- Green anarchism
- Eco-terrorism
- Vegan Anarchism/Total liberation
- Marius Mason
- Craig Rosebraugh
- Earth First!
- Animal Liberation Front
- Sea Shepherd Conservation Society
- Security culture
- How to Blow Up a Pipeline, book by Andreas Malm, and film
