= Total liberation =

Political movement

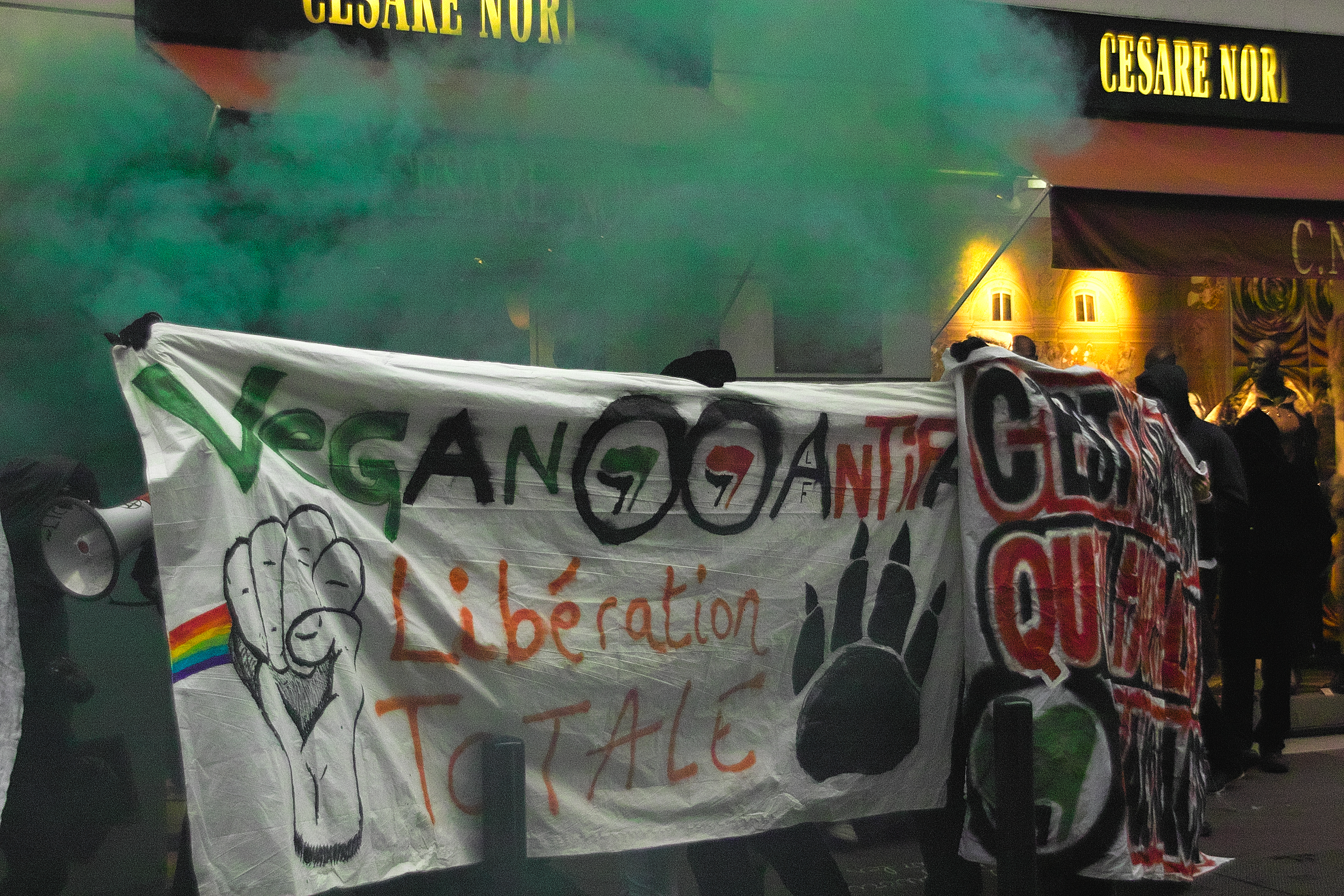
Anarchists and anti-fascists protesting for animal liberation

Total liberation, also referred to as total liberation ecology, is a political philosophy and movement that combines anarchism with a commitment to animal and earth liberation. Whilst more traditional approaches to anarchism have often focused primarily on opposing the state and capitalism, total liberation is additionally concerned with opposing all additional forms of human oppression as well as the oppression of other animals and ecosystems. Proponents of total liberation typically espouse a holistic and intersectional approach aimed at using direct action to dismantle all forms of domination and hierarchy, common examples of which include the state, capitalism, colonialism, patriarchy, racism, heterosexism, cissexism, disablism, ageism, speciesism, and ecological domination.

== History and key concerns ==
Discussing "total liberation" in 1961's The Wretched of the Earth, Frantz Fanon emphasized a link between psychological and social freedom. He said: "Total liberation is that which concerns all sectors of the personality." Third World movements, such as the Palestine Liberation Organization and African National Congress, subsequently used the term to signify a rejection of compromise with colonizers.

Also in the 1960s, a new era of anarchist struggle was distinguished by its adoption of a range of concerns such as feminism, anticolonialism, queer liberation, antispeciesism, and ecology that were previously of little or no concern for most anarchists. More specifically, the involvement by anarchists in the animal and earth liberation movements was in part characterized by the rising popularity of veganism within radical circles, something that has been grounded in concerns for both animal rights and environmentalism as well as the formation of direct action groups such as the Hunt Saboteurs Association, Earth First!, the Animal Liberation Front and the Earth Liberation Front.

Moreover, a commitment to total liberation, beyond its emergence from the historical development of the anarchist movement, is also typically grounded in a concern for contemporary schools of political thought such as intersectionality, antispeciesism, ecofeminism, deep ecology and social ecology. As David Pellow summarises:

The concept of total liberation stems from a determination to understand and combat all forms of inequality and oppression. I propose that it comprises four pillars: (1) an ethic of justice and anti-oppression inclusive of humans, nonhuman animals, and ecosystems; (2) anarchism; (3) anti-capitalism; and (4) an embrace of direct action tactics.

In February 1999, animal rights activists organized a Total Liberation Conference in Boca Raton, Florida, featuring speakers from the American Indian Movement and MOVE. Earth First! Journal announced: "To make change, we must band together. Join MOVE, the Anarchist Black Cross Federation, American Indian Movement, Animal Liberation Front Supporters, Food Not Bombs and others at this important conference."

On January 10–11, 2004, anarchists in Erie, Pennsylvania held a Total Liberation Fest featuring hardcore punk sets and speakers including Ashanti Alston, Russell Means, Rod Coronado, Steven Best and Ramona Africa. A few of the attendees formed a band called Gather and wore "Total Liberation" shirts modeled on well-known "Animal Liberation" shirts worn by the band Earth Crisis. Gather member Eva "Genie" Hall has explained what total liberation meant to the band: "We simply wanted to be clear that we weren't a single-issue band and that we believed in animal, earth, and human liberation. For us, that meant anarcha-feminism and the end of patriarchy; it meant acknowledging that a "vegan revolution" doesn't challenge the problems with modern totalitarian agriculture; it meant that we were aware that consumerist choices about our diets wouldn't lead to a magical downfall of oppressive capitalist systems; and it meant acknowledging the horrible costs of imperialism/globalization and industrial civilization. 'Total liberation' was our way of talking about 'intersectionality,' I suppose."

In his 2014 book The Politics of Total Liberation: Revolution for the 21st Century, American philosopher Steven Best argues for the necessity for disparate social movements to embrace the concept:

The global capitalist world system is inherently destructive to people, animals and nature. It is unsustainable and the bills for three centuries of industrialization are overdue. It cannot be humanized, civilized or made green-friendly, but rather must be transcended through revolution at all levels–social, economic, political, legal, cultural, technological, moral, and conceptual. We must replace single-issue approaches and fragmentary struggles with systemic battles and political alliances. In the most encompassing terms, these clashes address the war against humans, animals and the earth, and must combine in a politics of total liberation. We must link the liberation of humans to other animals to the planet as a whole. We need to build a revolutionary movement strong enough to vanquish capitalist hegemony and to remake society without crushing lodestones of anthropocentrism, speciesism, patriarchy, racism, classism, statism, heterosexism, ableism, and every other pernicious form of hierarchal domination.

Active Distribution published an anonymously-authored book on Total Liberation in 2019. Insisting that "animal and earth liberation are no less integral to the new revolutionary mosaic" than human liberation, the volume explored the praxis of total liberation as exemplified in MOVE, the Animal and Earth Liberation Fronts, the 2008 Greek insurrection, and the Rojava Revolution.

In 2022, Green Theory & Praxis Journal published a Total Liberation Pathway which involved "an abolition of compulsory work for all beings".

== Anarchism and animal rights ==
The anarchist philosophical and political movement has some connections to elements of the animal liberation movement. Many anarchists are vegetarian or vegan (or veganarchists) and have played a role in combating perceived injustices against non-human animals. They usually describe the struggle for the liberation of non-human animals as a natural outgrowth of the struggle for human freedom.

== Veganism and anarchism ==
Veganarchism is the political philosophy of veganism (more specifically animal liberation) and anarchism, creating a combined praxis as a means for social revolution. This encompasses viewing the state as unnecessary and harmful to animals, both human and non-human, whilst practicing a vegan lifestyle. Veganarchists either see the ideology as a combined theory, or perceive both philosophies to be essentially the same. It is further described as an anti-speciesist perspective on green anarchism, or an anarchist perspective on animal liberation. Vegan anarchist subcultures promote total liberationism, which seeks to unite the fragmented movements for human, animal and earth (ecosystem) liberation into a larger and stronger movement.

== See also ==
- Animal rights
- Animal Liberation Front (ALF)
- Animal Rights Militia (ARM)
- Animal rights and punk subculture
- Food Not Bombs
- Green anarchism
- Green Scare
- Leaderless resistance
- List of animal rights advocates
- Revolutionary Cells – Animal Liberation Brigade (RCALB)
