= Individualists Tending to the Wild =

Eco-extremist group from Mexico

- Individualistas Tendiendo a lo Salvaje
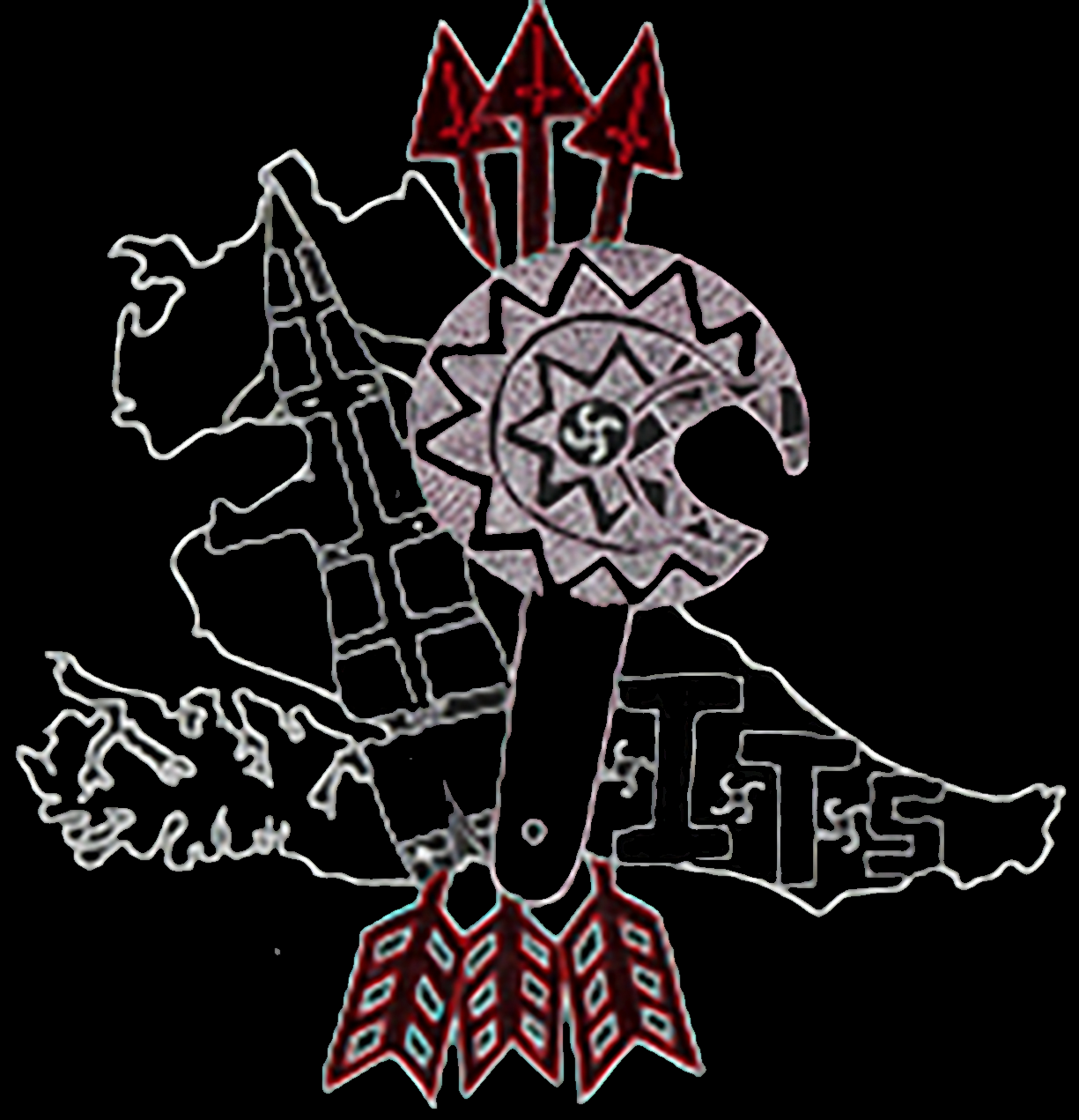
- Logo used by ITS
- Dates active: April 27, 2011–present
- Country: Mexico
- Active regions: Mexico; Argentina; Brazil; Chile
- Ideology: Eco-extremism; Anti-tech radicalism Neo-Luddism; Ecofascism
- Status: Active

Individualists Tending to the Wild (Spanish: Individualistas Tendiendo a lo Salvaje, ITS) is a self-defined eco-extremist group that emerged in Mexico in 2011. Mexican authorities have attributed some acts of violence to it, but most of the attacks claimed by the group have been denied after judicial investigations and attributed to other groups or crimes other than terrorism. The lack of a task of contrasting information by the media has led to any violent action claimed by ITS reaching public opinion.

== Ideology ==
On February 3, 2016, ITS posted a statement on a blog called Maldición Eco-extremista. In the post, it defined itself as "eco-extremist", accusing scientific and technological progress of being responsible for the devastation of ecosystems and the development of a civilization that distances itself from nature. They represent an opposite of a hypercivilized society that, nurtured by anarchist ideals, see in the annihilation of the agents of technological development a means to achieve the ideal of the perfect primitive man. To reverse the technological progress that they see as a process of degradation they announced that they would carry out forceful acts against those it had identified as responsible, without remorse. The group assured that it had begun its terrorist activities in 2011, sending letter bombs to university teachers who were dedicated to teaching nanotechnology and other related sciences in various university centers in Mexico.

The methodology of these first actions resembled that of Ted Kaczynski, who was the group's foremost inspiration. However, other neo-luddist or anarcho-primitivist groups are critical and apparently came to put themselves in contact with Kaczynski himself, who in early 2012 wrote a scathing letter against ITS for its naive proposal for revolutionary action and a lax analysis of social movements throughout history.

In 2014, ITS announced a new phase and issued a statement announcing its union with a dozen eco-anarchist groups.

ITS claimed to have extended its influence from Mexico to several European and Latin American countries, including a presence in Chile and Brazil. This internationalization has not been corroborated by the facts and its presence has not been confirmed at present. The group does not appear on the list of international terrorist organizations of the European Council or in that of the US State Department.

During the early days of their existence, Individualists Tending to the Wild posted on a blog called War on Society delineating the differences between their beliefs and anarchism. They do not center their ideas and ideologies around the problem of authority, but rather humanity's distancing from nature. To illustrate this, they give family structures as an example; ITS does not take a problem with the power exercised within a given family as long as it practices what they deem a nomadic hunter-gatherer one. As a result, they do not oppose civilization for the same reasons that an anarcho-primitivist would.

A leader of the ITS claimed to have been influenced by the satanic fascist group the Tempel ov Blood.

== Chronology ==
=== Activity in Mexico ===
On April 27, 2011, a package bomb exploded at the Polytechnic University of the Valley of Mexico in Tultitlán, State of Mexico, seriously injuring an employee. ITS claimed responsibility for the attack as the beginning of its terrorist activity, manufacturing and sending incendiary devices to various researchers in university centers in Mexico, although most of the packages either did not explode or were neutralized.

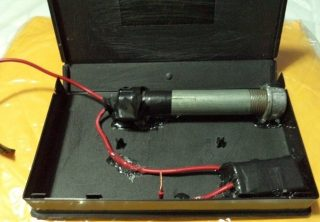
Bomb package prepared by a small group of ITS in approximately 2015

At the beginning of August, a second wave of attacks began when a package bomb detonated inside the Monterrey Institute of Technology and Higher Education. The scientist Armando Herrera Corral was injured in the legs, and became deaf as a consequence. Professor Alejandro Aceves López was also injured in the face and arms, and one of the splinters of the explosive punctured his lung. The Mexican judicial authorities attributed the attack to ITS. The next day, A suspicious package was located at CINVESTAV (a research center belonging to the National Polytechnic Institute) in Irapuato, Guanajuato. Members of the police specializing in handling explosives removed the device without it exploding. The bomb was aimed at the brother of the scientist injured in the explosion that occurred on August 9. A month later, a homemade explosive was located and deactivated at the Faculty of Higher Studies (FES) in Cuautitlán Izcalli. Although the same group claimed responsibility for the placement of this artifact on its blog, this claim has never been confirmed by the authorities, nor was this claim picked up by the media.

In a statement in September 2011, ITS announced that there would be silence and that it would not claim acts on a temporary basis. However, a month later a package bomb exploded inside a courier company, injuring three workers who had tampered with the package. The authorities blamed ITS, although the group has never claimed responsibility for this act. After these last events, ITS began to carry out one of the defining characteristics of this group, which is the claim of attacks in the media, which are later proven to not be its responsibility. In this way, on November 8, Ernesto Méndez Salinas, a UNAM investigator, was shot when he was returning home in his car. The crime, profusely claimed by ITS through messages to the media, which did not verify the information before publishing it, was later attributed by the authorities in charge of the investigation to a criminal gang unrelated to ITS. One month later, a letter bomb slightly wounded a professor at the Polytechnic University of Pachuca, in central Mexico. The attack was again claimed by ITS, causing concern among the educational community in that region. A year later, on February 21, 2013, a maintenance worker from the Mexican Postal Service, José Luis García Luna, was injured by opening a package bomb that was inside a mailbox, causing the explosion to fracture his hand and burn him. ITS claimed responsibility for the attack, but the Mexican judicial authorities did not confirm its responsibility.

After another period of inactivity, ITS announced in August 2014 its union with several eco-anarchist groups with pro-indigenous affinities, which reject the consequences of European colonization in America and point to it as the cause of all conflicts and damage to indigenous populations. Based on this vision, they understand that contemporary civilization is something alien and harmful that must be responded to with hostility. This group, renamed the Wild Reaction (Spanish: Reacción Salvaje, RS), had an ephemeral duration of only one year. In this phase, the group increased messages to the media, citing itself for attacks that turned out to be false claims. Thus, during the month of April 2015, this group claimed responsibility for a large number of attacks and vandalism against telecommunications properties and facilities, without the authorities officially confirming responsibility.

In 2016, the Maldición Eco-extremista blog was created, where extensive statements written in a far-fetched style were published. On February 8, two package bombs were sent to scientists at the headquarters of the Ministry of Agriculture and Rural Development, in Zapopan, and at the National Council of Science and Technology, in Guadalajara, both in the state of Jalisco. The packages could not explode due to the lack of detonators. Days later, the Jalisco Attorney General's Office attributed the incident to ITS. In June of that year, ITS granted the first interview by email to the radio program Radio Fórmula after the murder of the Chief of Chemical Services of the Faculty of Chemistry of the National Autonomous University of Mexico (UNAM). His death was claimed by the terrorist group with a firearm, but it was actually proven, during the judicial investigation, that the death was due to a stabbing in the course of an argument with a coworker.

The following year, in May 2017, ITS once again falsely claimed responsibility for a murder through an interview with a Radio Fórmula program. On this occasion, they claimed that alleged members of the organization murdered university student Lesvy Berlin Osorio in Ciudad Universitaria, in Mexico City. However, during the investigation, a security camera was accessed that had captured an argument between Lesvy Berlin and her boyfriend. In the recording, it is seen that the latter beats her and the autopsy determines that the student died from strangulation caused by a telephone cable. After this evidence, the authorities ruled out the terrorist attack and it was considered a death due to sexist violence. That same month of May 2017, a third interview with ITS was published in the Mexican political magazine Siempre! in which they continued to claim this and other hypothetical terrorist actions, including three alleged murders (involving a bomb in the center of Torreón, and the murders of a MITHE official, and two campers while climbing Mount Tláloc, in Texcoco, the latter investigated by the authorities as armed robberies.) On July 14, a civilian, a 66 year old gardener who picked up a package in front of the Parroquia del Señor de la Misericordia was seriously injured by opening a bomb package disguised as a donation to the church in Gustavo A. Madero; the man suffered second and third degree burns to the abdomen and arms, as well as the loss of part of a finger and acoustic trauma. A press report from Attorney General's Office of Mexico City claimed the bomb was disguised as a box of cookies with the note "For the house of the Lord with all my heart". The authorities investigated the case, while a cell of the group claimed the attack days later.

The group also claimed a shooting attack against pilgrims on a highway near the municipality of El Marqués, in Querétaro, on March 21, 2017. A lot with several PVC pipes was set on fire in Ecatepec; the authorities indicated that it was the work of an act of vandalism; ITS took responsibility for the arson attack. They were also responsible for another arson attack that affected a cloth store in the same municipality. On October 18, a couple of individuals entered the Nuestra Señora del Carmen Catholic Church in Cuautitlán Izcalli, and one of them stabbed the priest Rubén Díaz Alcántara, who bled to death. ITS took responsibility for the attack, but the authorities confirmed that the homicide was due to a personal matter. On June 7, 2018, a fire affected a logging yard in Iztapalapa, firefighters were slow to put out the fire which destroyed several trucks and damaged nearby houses. ITS claimed responsibility but the authorities confirmed that it was due to an electrical failure. On July 15, members of ITS claimed the abandonment of an incendiary load in a Metrobús car in the Benito Juárez delegation. The car still with passengers was evacuated by the driver, material losses were recorded due to the fire, but the authorship of ITS was not confirmed. On December 28 of the same year, ITS was responsible for the detonation of a low intensity explosive in front of the “Power Center” shopping plaza in Coacalco.

In February 2019, a series of attacks without fatalities was again claimed by the group through communications to various local media. However, the President of Mexico Andrés Manuel López Obrador, in a press conference called on March 4, 2019, to announce various security initiatives, declared that "there is no recent information about the terrorist group [ITS]. There is information that other organizations are acting and that they are causing acts of violence." Months later the group claimed responsibility for the fire in the substation of the Federal Electricity Commission of Santa Martha Acatitla, and the fire in La Merced Market that left two people dead and most of the stalls were burned leaving considerable material losses. The fire in the substation affected several neighborhoods that were left without electrical service, in addition to the fact that the largest warehouse in the market was rendered useless, its demolition being planned for the safety of the tenants and buyers who go to this supply center daily, but the authorities have not confirmed what was published by the group.

=== Supposed internationalization ===
As of 2013, ITS, as part of its communication strategy, began to also claim attacks committed outside of Mexico as its own. In this way, various attacks in 2013, 2014 and 2016 against street furniture and vehicles of the security forces in Porto Alegre (Brazil) were claimed by ITS from the beginning, as the beginning of an international armed struggle campaign. In 2016, the region's police carried out a police operation, which they called “Operation Erebo”, to find those responsible for the various low-intensity terrorist attacks. Several private houses and squatters were searched, finding in them various material for the preparation of explosives and anarchist publications, but denying them being associated with ITS. In solidarity with the prosecution of the detainees, anarchist media manifested their dissatisfaction with the government and published statements from independent publishers located in Porto Alegre and without any relation to ITS. Subsequent political initiatives to combat terrorist actions in Brazil, contrary to what was defended by ITS on its blog, were not responses to their actions and those of other groups, but rather it was interpreted in the key of internal police control according to the analysis of various media. In April 2016, the "Wild Constellations" cell claimed to leave explosives in the Argentine Nanotechnology Foundation, threats by e-mail to several researchers and a package bomb at the Retiro bus station and the National Technological University, but the authorities treated these cases as isolated incidents and did not mention ITS and its cells.

Two years later, on December 25, 2018, the Special Police Operations Battalion safely deactivated an improvised explosive device in front of the Santuário Menino Jesus in Brasília, claimed by ITS. Shortly afterwards, three people were arrested as the alleged perpetrators of the attempted attack. The Brazilian authorities did not confirm the responsibility for the attack, which was part of a wave of incidents carried out by organized crime throughout the country that the Jair Bolsonaro administration was unable to stop between 2018 and 2019. Months later, on April 28, two trucks belonging to the Brazilian Institute of the Environment and Renewable Natural Resources were burned in addition to the sabotage of other infrastructures in the national park of Brasília. In a statement the self-styled "Sociedad Salvaje Silvestre" cell took responsibility for the attack but the Brazilian media did not give media coverage. The government attributed it to the protests of the employees of the Brazilian Institute of Environment and the Institute Chico Mendes from Conservação da Biodiversidade, who see their jobs in both institutions for the conservation of the Brazilian rainforest in danger due to Jair Bolsonaro's policies against the Environment. During those weeks it was made public that Minister Damares Alves of the Brazilian Ministry of Women, Family and Human Rights and Minister Ricardo Salles of the Ministry of the Environment had received death threats from eco-terrorist cells and that they continued to be investigated without determining the perpetrators of such threats. On July 19, threats were repeated by an alleged member identified as "Añangá" to President Jair Bolsonaro and two of his ministers in an interview with the controversial magazine Veja.

The first ITS attack in Chile took place on February 18, 2016, The group "Sureños Incivilizados" made its appearance and totally burned a Transantiago bus in broad daylight, the arson attack did not leave injuries but left users shocked. On May 19, an incendiary device was found inside the Faculty of Physical Sciences and Mathematics at the University of Chile, when a cleaning employee found the device and called members of the GOPE who deactivated it and deans of the university complained about this incident. In July 2016, they were responsible for the fire on the roof of the Mall "Vivo" located in the Maipú commune, but the authorities did not comment on the causes of the fire. On January 13, 2017, an explosive package was sent to the then president of the Chilean mining company Codelco, Óscar Landerretche, who was injured when it detonated. The authorship of ITS was collected in numerous Chilean media but Landerretche himself denied the possibility that there is an ecoterrorist group in Chile. Landerretche blamed “greater interests”, interpreting the action as an attempted false flag attack. On August 10, 2017, The cell “Bandada Inquisidora Vengativa”, another ITS group in Chile, took responsibility for an incendiary artifact that totally incinerated a Transantiago, in Huechuraba, leaving serious material losses and causing the fire to spread to other nearby sites. The authorities ruled out the authorship, and affirmed that it was a technical failure.

On December 6, 2017, a package bomb exploded prematurely when being manipulated by warehouse workers at a Correo Argentino branch in the Bonarense town of Monte Grande, leaving two workers injured. ITS claimed it and in its statement said that the package was addressed to an unidentified person specialized in science, the police investigated but could not find those responsible.

On April 15, 2018, ITS members put an explosive charge in front of the Silva Henríquez Catholic University, the police force deactivated the bomb, generating a large police mobilization. Later in the year, on September 7, 2018, an explosive device was detonated in the Faculty of Agronomy of the University of Chile without causing injuries, claimed by ITS in a statement on its blog.

Months later, on January 4, 2019, an explosive package detonated at a bus stop in Santiago de Chile, injuring 5 people. ITS claimed responsibility for the attack, its claim being reproduced in numerous Chilean media, this attack being one of a string of attacks that affected the means of public transport in Chile, some of them intentional, and whose perpetrators rarely claimed responsibility. The Chilean government has not officially confirmed that all these attacks were carried out by ITS.

The Scottish police carried out a controlled explosion of an explosive device near Edinburgh Castle on January 11, 2018. ITS claimed responsibility for the placement of the explosive device through blog posts and e-mails to local media. At the end of the same year, at Christmas 2018, a device exploded at the entrance of the Agios Dionysios Orthodox Church in Athens. The "Iconoclasta Sect" claimed responsibility for the attack, and the security forces continued with the investigations. In June 2021 two Greek nationals were arrested in Edinburgh for the bomb left near Edinburgh castle which lead to the further arrests of three suspects in Athens in relation to the case.

On May 9, 2019, the president of the Santiago Metro board, Louis de Grange, emerged unscathed from an attempted attack when he received an explosive package that was deactivated by the police. Shortly after, ITS published a statement showing images of the alleged explosive package and claiming the action. The Chilean authorities condemned the action and announced the initiation of the investigation but did not confirm that ITS was the author of the attack. At the same time, in an interview with one of the lawyers representing Landerretche, it was revealed that the investigation of both terrorist acts were linked but whose authorities continued to act with secrecy and preferred to remain silent about the authorship. On May 29, 2019, the President of Chile, Sebastián Piñera, took advantage of the attacks to present in Congress a draft anti-terrorism law containing a package of measures that affected the daily life of Chilean citizens. In the midst of the public debate over the processing of this law presented by the government, the arrest of the alleged author of the various attacks took place, according to the Chilean prosecutor's office on August 8, 2019, describing the young detainee as a lone wolf. However, ITS denied that the detainee was a member of its organization and that he was the author of any of the attacks attributed to ITS, in a statement published the following day. Weeks later, the Supreme Court of Chile charged the 28-year-old man with 6 terrorism crimes for perpetrating attacks with incendiary devices. At this time, some of the evidence linking the accused with the attacks was also published in the Chilean press, in which it was revealed that he was carrying information from ITS, with whom he was in contact on the dark web.

In October 2019, South America was agitated with a series of protests against the executive of Mauricio Macri in Argentina and Sebastián Piñera in Chile. In the latter country, protests arose as a result of a rise in the transport rates that affected Chilean citizens and lead to a government crisis with the resignation of the executive to try to save the fall of President Piñera. In the midst of this context, riots and violent acts carried out by organized groups took place, which were denounced by Piñera, who tried to associate them with the peaceful protests in an interview in his attempt to quell the protests. On November 8, one of these groups assaulted the Argentine embassy in Santiago de Chile and shortly afterwards the Argentine newspaper Clarín unveiled a police report that identified ITS as an organized international violent group with a presence in Chile.

== See also ==
- Criticism of technology
- Eco-terrorism
- Fake news
- Neo-Luddism
- Nihilism
- Post-truth politics
