= Simon Hailwood =

British philosopher

Simon Hailwood is a British philosopher whose research concerns moral philosophy, political philosophy, environmental philosophy, environmental ethics, political realism, and pragmatism. He is a Professor of Philosophy in the Department of Philosophy at the University of Liverpool, which he joined in 2004 as a lecturer.

Hailwood completed a PhD at Liverpool; his thesis, Exploring Nozick: Beyond Anarchy, State and Utopia, was submitted in 1995. The project addressed the moral philosophy of Robert Nozick, and was the basis of Hailwood's book of the same name, published in 1996 by Avebury. He went on to publish How to be a Green Liberal: Nature, Value and Liberal Philosophy, a 2003 book about green liberalism, with McGill-Queen's University Press; and Alienation and Nature in Environmental Philosophy, a 2015 book on environmental philosophy, with Cambridge University Press.

He was previously the reviews editor (2009–12), associate editor (2012–15) and then managing editor (2015–21) of the journal Environmental Values.
