= Whaling in Iceland =

Commercial hunting of whales in Iceland

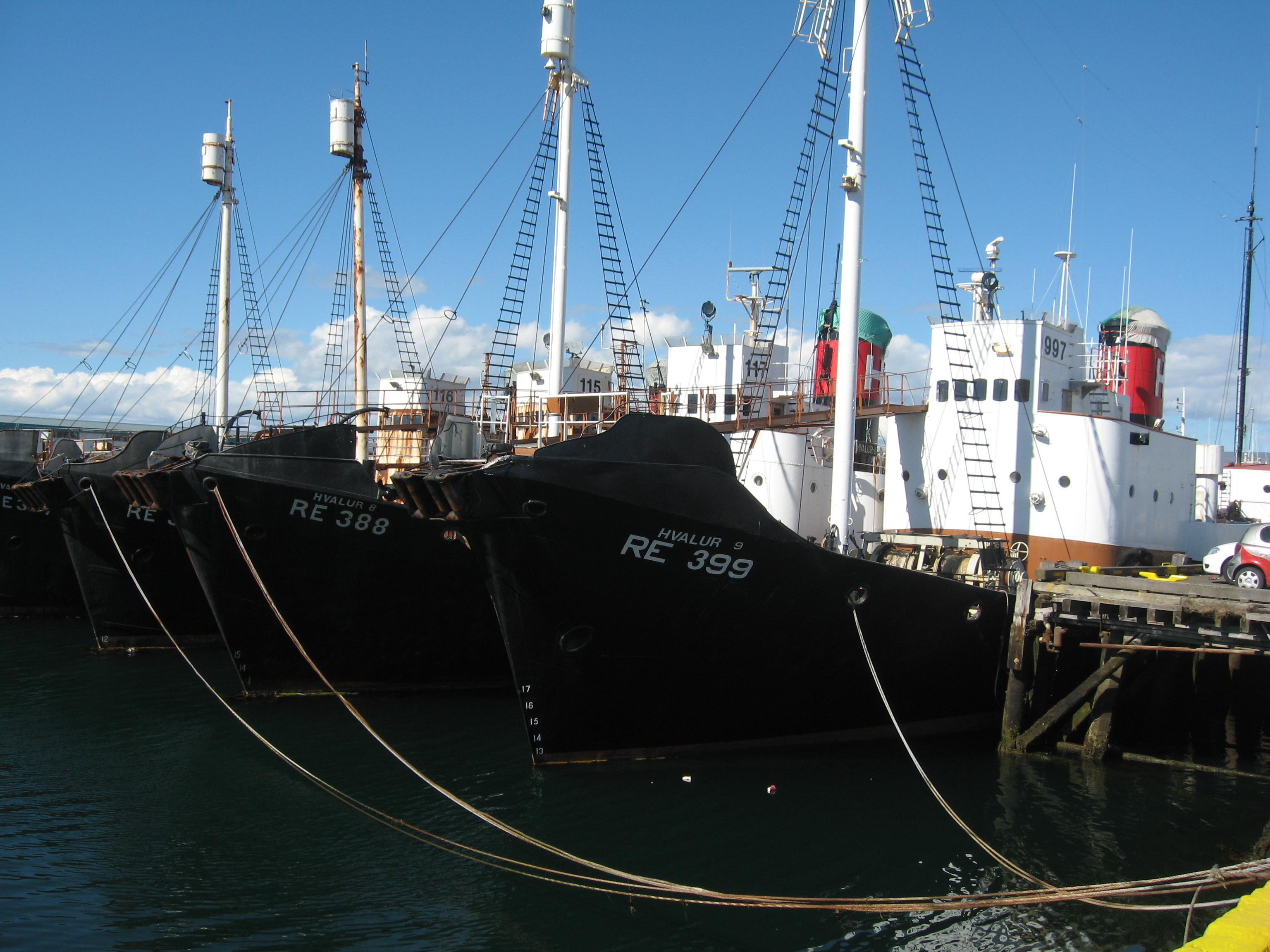
Icelandic whaling vessels in Reykjavík harbour

Whaling in Iceland began with spear-drift hunting as early as the 12th century, and continued in a vestigial form until the late 19th century, when other countries introduced modern commercial practices. Iceland is one of the countries that objected to a moratorium established by the International Whaling Commission in 1986, and that still maintains a whaling fleet. One company (Hvalur hf.) remains concentrated on hunting fin whales, largely for export to Japan, while the only other one previously hunted minke whales for domestic consumption until 2020, as the meat was popular with tourists. In 2018, Hvalur hf. whalers killed a rare blue whale/fin whale hybrid.

Whaling was temporarily paused in Iceland between 2019 and 2021 as coronavirus restrictions, competition from subsidized Japanese whaling and increasing domestic whale watching tourism hampered the industry, however the practice was resumed in June 2022.

Iceland has a whale watching sector, which exists in tension with the whaling industry.

== History ==
=== Pre-19th century whaling ===
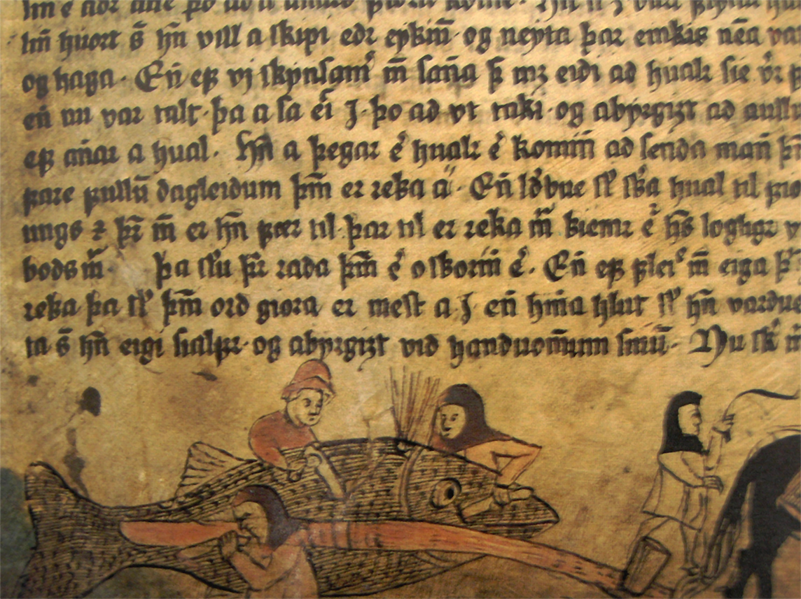
Depiction of Icelanders flenching a whale from a 16th-century manuscript

Ancient literature, such as the Norse sagas, does not reveal a history of whale fisheries in Iceland but occasionally describes conflicts between various families over whale carcasses and early links between Scandinavian people and whales. For example, Vikings from Norway introduced the whaling techniques of driving small cetaceans, such as pilot whales, into fjords. Additionally, the 13th century document Konungs skuggsjá describes a number of marine mammals, including several types of whales and dolphins. A 17th-century work by Jón Guðmundsson specifically lists whales recognized today as the sperm whale, narwhal, right whale, fin whale and the blue whale. Narwhals were hunted for the spiral shaped ivory tooth, sometimes presented as a mythical unicorn's horn.

Spear-drift whaling had been practised in the North Atlantic as early as the 12th century. In open boats, hunters would strike a whale with a marked spear with the intent of later locating the beached carcass and claiming a rightful share.

Research shows that Basque whalers appeared in Iceland and set up whaling stations there at the earliest in the early 17th century. Foreign whaling fleets, in particular Basque and Dutch, did not become prominent in Icelandic waters until the 17th century. Danes did not whale here in large numbers, except briefly during the 1630s. Interactions between Basque whalers and Icelanders were mixed. Icelanders circumvented the burdensome trade monopoly of the Danish King by conducting illicit trade with foreign whalers. In what has been termed Spánverjavígin, a crew of 32 shipwrecked and stranded Basque were executed by Icelanders in 1615. In 1662, locals in Skagaströnd attributed the sudden blindness of 64 sheep to magic spells cast by French whalers on the sheep. Jón Guðmundsson condemned the local sheriff for this decision in his account of the event. Since 2005, historian Magnús Rafnsson and archaeologist Ragnar Edvardsson have been excavating the remains of a 17th-century Basque whaling station in the northwest of Iceland.

Icelanders did not engage in any large-scale whaling. According to contemporary sources, Icelanders lacked capital in the 18th century to invest in whaling, and did not have knowledge of the most effective whaling methods. Contemporary sources show that Icelanders were interested in starting whaling operations but lacked access to capital and did not have government support for innovation.

=== Modern whaling ===
Whalers from the United States and from Norway and other European nations expanded their activities into Icelandic waters with new techniques and technology in the late 19th century. In 1865, Americans Thomas Welcome Roys and C. A. Lilliendahl tested their experimental rocket harpoon design and set up a shore station in Seyðisfjörður, east Iceland. However, a slump in oil prices after the American Civil War forced their endeavor into bankruptcy in 1867. A Danish naval officer, O.C. Hammer, set up two shore stations in Iceland and used Roys' rocket harpoon design. Norwegian Svend Foyn (famous for later inventing the modern whaling harpoon) also studied the American method in Iceland.

In 1883, whaling expanded from Norwegian waters to Iceland as unrestricted catching depleted whale stocks off the coast of Norway. Svend Foyn made several attempts to profit from whaling in Iceland but was ultimately unsuccessful. In reaction to demands that Norwegians working in Iceland should become naturalized Icelandic (Danish) subjects, Foyn sold his shares to company partners and abandoned his plans for whaling in Iceland. The major shareholder, Thomas Amlie of Oslo, assumed the role of expedition manager and enjoyed great success. As a result, competing companies transferred their operations to Iceland. At the age of 82, Amlie was lost at sea with one of his whaling ships and all 32 hands in a violent 1897 storm. Amlie is considered the father of modern whaling in Iceland.

According to archeologist Ragnar Edvardsson, "both the archaeological and historical records suggest that Icelanders never participated in commercial whaling until the twentieth century... no large scale Icelandic industrial complexes have been recorded so far, and therefore, it seems that Icelanders themselves never participated in the European commercial whaling of the seventeenth to twentieth centuries" Between 1883 and 1915 ten (mostly Norwegian) whaling companies were founded, and operated 14 shore stations on the east and west coasts of Iceland. One of the most successful companies, managed by Hans Elefsen, in its best year produced a quarter of all of the whale oil in Iceland. He also used whale carcasses stripped of their blubber as raw material for a guano factory. However, in response to the decline in whale stocks, Elefsen moved his operation to South Africa in 1911.

In 1897, the Whale Industry Company of Iceland (Hval-Industri Aktieselskabet Island – also called the Icelandic Whaling Company) was established. An Icelandic merchant named A. Asgeirsson was its promoter and major stockholder but the company was heavily dependent on Norwegian personnel and equipment. After years of unsuccessful operation it went bankrupt and closed in 1913.

Blue and fin whales were primarily hunted, but humpback and sei whales were also included. However, prior to 1914 Icelanders did not hunt minke whales. Superstition held that minke whales were sent by God as protectors.

=== National whaling restrictions ===
Icelanders held mixed opinions on the whaling industry. Some welcomed the added earnings from taxes, duties and levies. Others complained that whaling ruined their herring fishery. As a result, in 1886 a May to October ban was enacted on whaling in herring fishing areas and Icelandic territorial waters. However, most whaling was done outside of the prohibited areas and went on unaffected by the limited ban.

In 1903 another whaling ban was proposed, only to be thrown out by the Althing. Later in 1913, a total ban on whaling was enacted, to start October 1, 1915. The ban was imposed in order to preserve whale stocks for Icelandic interests due to a perceived Norwegian threat.

The law was repealed in 1928, and in 1935 the government of Iceland issued a permit for one whaling station at Tálknafjörður (which later folded in 1939). A new 1935 law declared that whales in Icelandic territorial waters could only be hunted by Icelanders. In 1948, the Hvalur hf. company purchased an American naval base at Hvalfjörður (Whale Fjord) and converted it into a whaling station. Norwegian crews were involved in training Icelandic whalers into the early 1950s.

=== ICRW and IWC ===
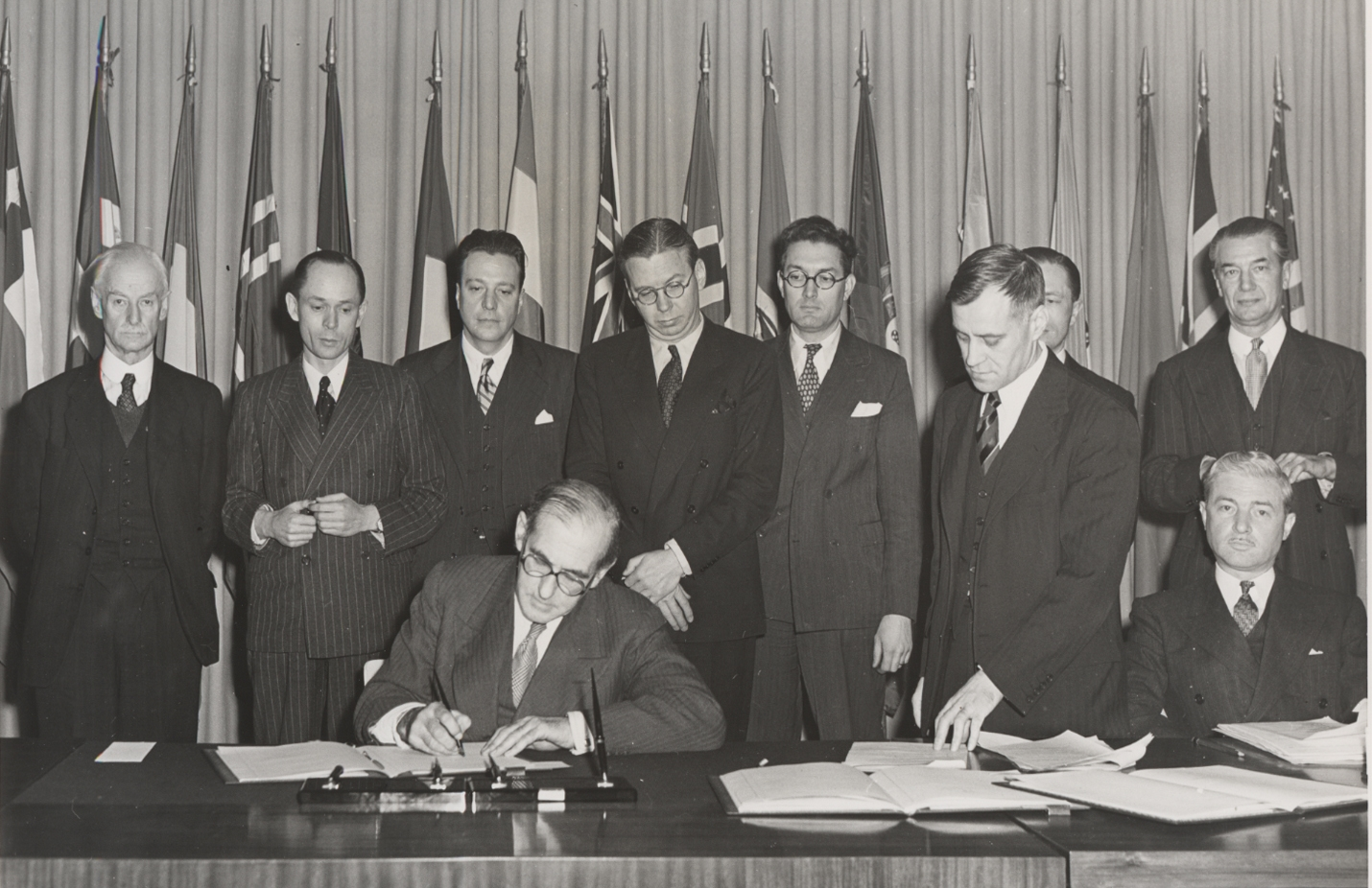
Signing the International Convention for the Regulation of Whaling, Washington, D.C. December 2nd, 1946

The International Convention for the Regulation of Whaling was created in 1946 in Washington, D.C. to "provide for the proper conservation of whale stocks and thus make possible the orderly development of the whaling industry". Based on the previous 1937 International Agreement and subsequent Protocols to that agreement in 1938 and 1945, the ICRW led to the 1949 creation of the International Whaling Commission and publishes guidelines for the international regulation of coastal and pelagic whaling. Iceland was a member of the IWC from the outset in 1949. Critics claim that the IWC and ICRW have largely failed due to a lack of enforceable rules and regulatory loopholes.

Like many other whaling nations, Icelandic whaling was inconsistent in conforming to rules established by the IWC. For example, in 1954 the IWC adopted a proposal for the total protection of blue whales, in response to concerns that localized protection was not effective. Blue whales were not to be taken in the North Atlantic for five years (from 1955 to 1959). However, Iceland objected and continued to hunt blues until 1960.

In 1956, Icelandic fishermen believed that a large population of orcas (killer whales) threatened their fisheries. After failing to clear the orcas from a series of nets, Icelanders called upon the US Air Force for assistance. As a NATO ally, the United States maintained an air base in Keflavík. The US Air Force responded with machine guns, rockets and depth charges to drive out the orcas. The Keflavík base would later become a point of diplomatic contention between the United States and Iceland due, in part, to disagreements over whaling.

Prior to 1974 minke whaling went unregulated in Iceland. National authorities set quotas and limits for Icelandic whalers, but IWC quotas were not established for North Atlantic minke whales until 1977. Before 1977, minke whales were indeed taken by fishermen from small villages, but were considered too insignificant to record catch statistics. The new IWC minke quotas were shared between Iceland, Norway and Denmark.

Between 1977 and 1983, Hvalur hf. had taken hundreds of undersized fin and sei whales and exported the meat to Japan, according to an IWC report.

=== Moratorium ===
In 1972, the United Nations Conference on the Human Environment voted 52–0 for a 10-year global moratorium on commercial whaling. However, the UN resolution was not adopted by the IWC: there were six "no" votes, four "yes" votes and four abstentions. Iceland, Japan, Russia, Norway, South Africa and Panama voted no.

In 1973, a moratorium was once again proposed but failed to obtain the required 75% majority at the IWC. (8-yes, 5-no, 1-abstain). Iceland, Japan, Russia, Norway and South Africa again voted no.

Between 1973 and 1982 the IWC's membership increased from 14 to 37 member nations, perhaps stacking the vote in favor of anti-whaling nations.

In 1980 and 1981 two more votes failed to establish a moratorium by a 75% majority.(13-9-2 and 16-8-3)

In 1982, the IWC finally voted in favor of a moratorium on commercial whaling to come into force in 1986 (25-7-5).

Unlike Norway, Iceland did not officially object to the IWC moratorium, and was therefore obliged to abide by the new restrictions. The Althing, perhaps under pressure from the US, voted 29–28 not to object.

=== Research whaling ===
By 1985, like Japan, Iceland submitted proposals to the IWC to continue whaling for research purposes under Article VIII of the ICRW. Iceland proposed a catch of up to 80 fin whales, 40 sei whales, 80 minkes and a limited experimental catch of blue and humpback whales. The research would be funded through the sale of whale meat to Japan. However, the proposal was denied by the IWC scientific committee in 1986.

Article VIII

1. Notwithstanding anything contained in this Convention any Contracting Government may grant to any of its nationals a special permit authorizing that national to kill, take and treat whales for purposes of scientific research subject to such restrictions as to number and subject to such other conditions as the Contracting Government thinks fit, and the killing, taking, and treating of whales in accordance with the provisions of this Article shall be exempt from the operation of this Convention. Each Contracting Government shall report at once to the Commission all such authorizations which it has granted. Each Contracting Government may at any time revoke any such special permit which it has granted.

2. Any whales taken under these special permits shall so far as practicable be processed and the proceeds shall be dealt with in accordance with directions issued by the Government by which the permit was granted.

In an attempt to gain acceptance of its proposals and under pressure from the United States, Iceland reduced the proposed whale meat exports from 95% to 49% of the total catch and the requested quota from 200 to 120 whales. Despite a domestic campaign to encourage Icelanders to consume more whale meat, most of the supply was used as feed on fur farms or spoiled in warehouses. In an open letter to the government, Icelandic biologists condemned the program.

Hvalur hf. took 386 fin and sei whales under scientific permit between 1986 and 1989. Despite IWC resolutions that required member states to use the meat domestically, Iceland exported up to 77% to Japan.

=== International pressure ===
Opposition outside of Iceland mounted a formidable front against Iceland's whaling industry through direct interference, protest, economic and diplomatic pressure.

In 1978, Greenpeace attempted to interfere with the hunt using the ship Rainbow Warrior. When they returned in 1979, Hvalur hf. ships fired harpoons over the protesters. Iceland began sending naval escorts with the whalers and twice seized the Rainbow Warrior with gunboats. The second incident occurred in international waters and Greenpeace Zodiacs were taken.

On November 6, 1986, Rodney Coronado and David Howitt, activists linked to the Sea Shepherd Conservation Society, sabotaged a whaling station at Hvalfjörd by destroying machinery and computers. They also unbolted the engines' raw water intakes on two of Iceland's four whaling ships and sank the vessels, still anchored, in Reykjavík harbour.

In 1987, Greenpeace action led to the seizure, in Hamburg, of 170 tons of Icelandic whale meat bound for Japan. The action was repeated in Finland in 1988 and claimed 197 tons. In each case the shipments were confiscated by local authorities in accordance with CITES (Convention on International Trade in Endangered Species).

During this time, the United States was involved in diplomatic negotiations with whaling nations such as Iceland and Japan. However, the U.S. was considered to be responsible for whaling troubles by many Icelanders. In October 1986, President Ronald Reagan was booed during the "Superpower Summit" and some lobbied against the American air base at Keflavik. It was argued that the U.S. and the IWC had no standing to interfere with Iceland's sovereignty regarding whale research. Despite the diplomatic tension, U.S. negotiators struck an agreement that would allow Iceland to take 20 sei whales, without the threat of U.S. sanctions (under the Pelly Amendment to the US Fishermen's Protection Act the U.S. President could establish an embargo against Iceland's fisheries). Iceland was required to submit a full research proposal in 1988. Japan also agreed not to purchase whale meat from Iceland to secure fishing rights in Alaskan waters.

By 1989, boycotts of Icelandic fish, organized by Greenpeace and other anti-whaling organizations, began to take a toll on Iceland's economy. Major buyers, such as supermarket and restaurant chains (for example, Wendy's and Long John Silver) canceled their contracts. Burger King reduced its purchases of Icelandic fish by 20%, leading to lost sales worth an estimated $1.5 million per year. The German consortium Tengelmann – which operated 600 supermarkets and 850 warehouses – also stopped purchasing Icelandic seafood due to Iceland's whaling policy, leading to lost sales of an estimated $1.5–1.6 million per year. Aldi Süd stopped purchasing Icelandic shrimp, leading to lost sales of ca $2.6 million per year. In total, Icelandic seafood exporters sustained losses of about $29 million by 1989, whereas the value of whale products had been only $4 million in 1987. Captain D's also stopped purchasing Icelandic seafood. Red Lobster stopped purchasing Icelandic lobster. Also, a strike of Iceland's scientists union meant no experts would be available to conduct research aboard whaling vessels. In 1989, Iceland announced it would not continue whaling. However, another research proposal was submitted in 1990 and later rejected by the IWC Scientific Committee.

In 1991, Iceland threatened to leave the IWC after its request to take 92 fin and 158 minke whales was denied as premature. Fisheries Minister Þorsteinn Pálsson claimed the IWC had abandoned all interest in exploiting whales giving Iceland the right to withdraw. Iceland left the International Whaling Commission in 1992.

In 2011, the United States implemented non-trade sanctions against Iceland.

=== Recommencement ===
Outside of the IWC, Iceland could not simply restart its whaling industry. Past resolutions required IWC nations, including Japan, to refrain from trade in whale products and whaling equipment with non-members. In 2001, Iceland made its first attempt to rejoin the International Whaling Commission with one condition: a reservation to the global moratorium on commercial whaling that would allow Iceland to hunt for commercial purposes despite its acceptance of the ban in 1982. However, the Commission voted against Iceland (19-0-3) with 16 nations refusing to participate due to disagreement over the legality of the vote and Iceland's request. Instead, Iceland was admitted as an observer following a ruling by the Chairman and a second vote.

The Commission does not accept Iceland's reservation regarding paragraph 10(e) of the Schedule (i.e. that Iceland is not bound by paragraph 10(e) of the Schedule, as reflected in its instrument of adherence dated 8 June 2001.)

Iceland made two additional attempts to rejoin the IWC in 2002. At the annual meeting in May, disagreement continued over Iceland's reservation to the moratorium. As a result, a 25–20 vote upheld the decision that Iceland should participate only as an observer. Iceland asserted the vote was illegal and left the meeting.

At a 2002 special meeting of the IWC, which some members did not attend, Iceland's request and reservation were once again brought before the commission. However, Iceland modified its reservation to specify a time-limit prior to the resumption of any commercial whaling under objection to the moratorium. In the votes that followed, the Commission first voted 18–18 to uphold the same process from previous meetings. The next vote upheld the Chairman's ruling that Iceland should be allowed to vote, 18–18 once again. Finally, the vote to uphold previous decisions to deny Iceland's reservation was defeated with 18 in favor and 19 opposed. Iceland was the deciding vote in its own favor as it rejoined the IWC. Half of the attending nations formally objected to the reservation.

Notwithstanding this, the Government of Iceland will not authorize whaling for commercial purposes by Icelandic vessels before 2006 and, thereafter, will not authorize such whaling while progress is being made in negotiations within the IWC on the RMS. This does not apply, however, in case of the so-called moratorium on whaling for commercial purposes, contained in paragraph 10(e) of the Schedule not being lifted within a reasonable time after the completion of the RMS. Under no circumstances will whaling for commercial purposes be authorized without a sound scientific basis and an effective management and enforcement scheme.

In 2003, Iceland proposed to resume research whaling after a 14-year interruption. The proposed quota would consist of 100 minke whales, and 100 fin and 50 sei whales (both endangered species). The study would examine the eating habits of whales in Icelandic waters. The Federation of Icelandic Fishing Vessel Owners claimed whales had reduced local cod stocks by 10–20 percent. However, environmental groups disputed the figures and asserted that fish stocks had actually been reduced by commercial overfishing.

The IWC voted 21–16 requesting Iceland reconsider the proposal. IWC resolution 2003-2 noted the potential threat to Iceland's sei whale stocks, recognized the existence of previously collected feeding data and called upon both Iceland and Japan to refrain from continued lethal research.

Britain responded by leading 23 countries in a formal protest against the resumption of Icelandic research whaling. Representatives of Iceland's tourism industry also announced their opposition and concerns over the potential negative effect of boycotts. However, polls within Iceland showed popular support for the whaling industry.

Iceland's research whaling program continued from 2003 to 2007 taking a total of 200 minke whales.

=== Commercial whaling ===
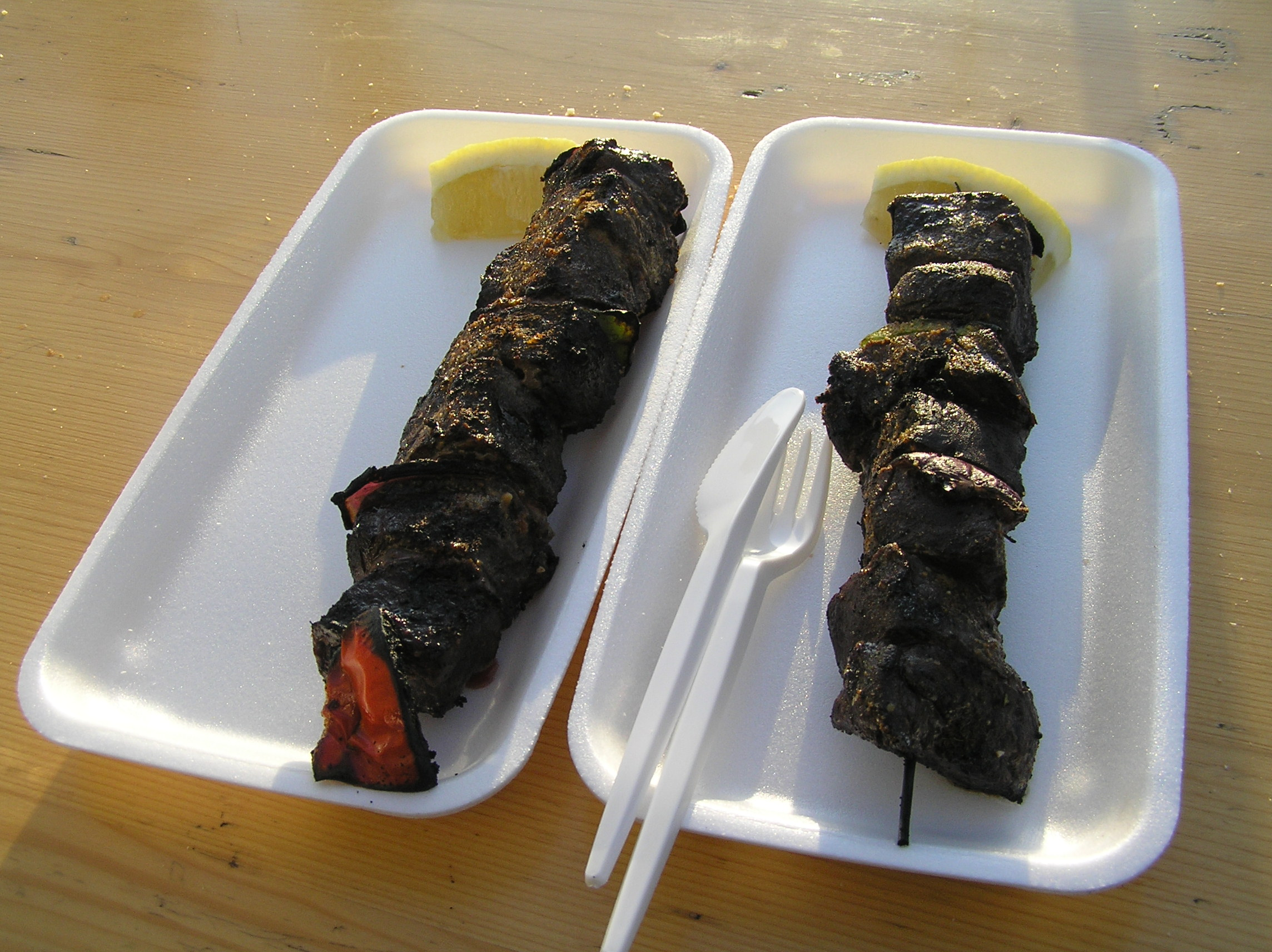
Minke whale meat kebabs, Reykjavík

In October 2006, the Icelandic government issued licenses for a commercial whale hunt in addition to the continuing scientific program. Iceland had pledged not to resume commercial whaling until 2006 when presumably talks about sustainable whaling would be completed. The talks had not come to a resolution thereafter, and instead stalled due to the differences between those who want to resume whaling and those who do not.

Over the twelve-month period ending in August 2007, Icelandic whalers were authorized by the Icelandic government to hunt and sell 30 minke whales and 9 fin whales. Iceland resumed commercial whaling on 21 October 2006 after Icelandic whalers caught a Fin Whale. Iceland has an exemption to the moratorium through the reservation made in 2002.

Twenty-five nations delivered a formal diplomatic protest (called a "demarche") to the Icelandic government on 1 November 2006 concerning resumed commercial whaling. The protest was led by the UK and signed by nations including the United States, Australia, Brazil, France, Germany, Finland and Sweden.

Kristján Loftsson, owner of the whaling company Hvalur hf. (Icelandic for Whale), which had had to diversify from its main industry for the preceding 20 years, stated that there is no reason they can't continue hunting whales for eternity by sustainable management of the hunting. Kristján also indicated that he planned to export the meat to Japan as neither Iceland nor Japan is subject to a trade ban, although Claire Sterling of the International Fund for Animal Welfare said that Japan has officially stated that it would not be buying Icelandic whale meat. As Japan does not have any laws against importing whale meat it would not hinder such an import.

After a brief suspension of whaling activities, commercial hunting resumed in May 2008, when a new license was granted. The minke catch in 2006 and 2007 was all sold. The head of the Icelandic minke whaling association was hoping for a quota of around 100 minkes in 2008. Whaling was authorized to continue in 2009, but the new Fisheries Minister and leader of the Left-Green Movement Steingrímur J. Sigfússon said that there was no guarantee that whaling would continue in the long-term under the new government.

In 2009 Hvalur hf. caught 125 fin whales and planned to export up to 1,500 tonnes of whalemeat to Japan. The fin whale is globally listed as an endangered species.

In 2010, Iceland's proposed quota in killing fin whales was much larger than the amount of whale meat the Japanese market could absorb. However, in negotiations with Marc Wall, Economic Minister-Counselor at the US embassy in Tokyo, Jun Yamashita of the Japanese Fisheries Agencies rejected a proposal to suggest to Iceland to reduce the number of killed fin whales to a more reasonable number.

In March 2010, environmental organizations accused Iceland of illegally exporting whale meat to Denmark and Latvia. The Icelandic government later stated several shipments of fish meat were incorrectly labeled as whale meat. Then in April, 15 Greenpeace activists chained themselves to the mooring lines of the container ship NYK Orion in Rotterdam. The action was undertaken to stop a shipment of endangered fin whale meat from Iceland, destined for Japan. The activists unchained themselves after the meat was voluntarily unloaded by the shipping company. Hvalur shipped more than 600 tons of Fin whale meat to Japan in the first 9 months of 2010.

In November 2010, U.S. Commerce Secretary Gary Locke issued a statement criticizing Iceland for killing 273 fin whales in two years in defiance of the moratorium on commercial whaling.

"The United States strongly opposes Iceland’s defiance of the commercial whaling ban. We urge Iceland to cease international trade of whale meat and work with the international community to safeguard whale species. It is troubling that Iceland continues to pursue commercial whaling outside the boundaries of the IWC, without member oversight or analysis by the Commission’s scientific committee."

U.S. Commerce Secretary Gary Locke

Iceland's return to commercial whaling was announced on May 27, 2013, as Kristján stated that his two whaling vessels would become operational again in June 2013. Up to 184 endangered fin whales were to be hunted over the northern summer of 2013.

In 2020, Iceland announced that whaling activities would cease as coronavirus pandemic restrictions and decreasing sales to Japan limited the feasibility of a harvest. That same year, whaling for minke whales by the only company targeting domestic markets was permanently ended. A similar decision to halt all whaling activities was made for the summer whaling season of 2021 in light of ongoing pandemic restrictions and steady increases in whale watching tourism, and only a single minke whale was taken. However, in March 2022, Hvalur hf. announced that they intended to resume hunting fin whales, and took 148 fin whales that summer. In 2023, 24 fin whales were caught, and no mink whales were hunted. A report commissioned by the Ministry of Food and Fisheries concluded that whaling had a negligible impact on Iceland’s economy, accounting for less than 1% of marine exports in 2022.

Iceland is one of three countries, along with Norway and Japan, that have allowed commercial whaling in recent years. In the summer of 2023, Iceland suspended whaling for most of the season due to animal welfare concerns, as the Fisheries Minister determined that the killing of whales took longer than legally permitted. This decision was criticized by the ombudsman for being disproportionate and lacking legal basis, causing political tension within the ruling coalition. The Left-Green Party opposes whaling, while the Independence Party and Progressive Party show more support for the practice. Iceland's commercial whaling primarily targets fin whales, classified as “vulnerable” to extinction by the International Union for the Conservation of Nature.

After announcing that it would stop commercial whaling by the end of 2024, Iceland granted a five-year license to Hvalur hf, the only company in the country still practicing whaling. The license allowed for killing 128 fin whales, in line with advice from the Icelandic Marine Research Institute, which suggested that up to 161 fin whales and 217 mink whales could be hunted. In September 2026 the government of Iceland announced that it intended to revise the country's whaling law, with an option to permanently ban continued whaling. The quote for 2026 was 150 fin whales.

== Production ==
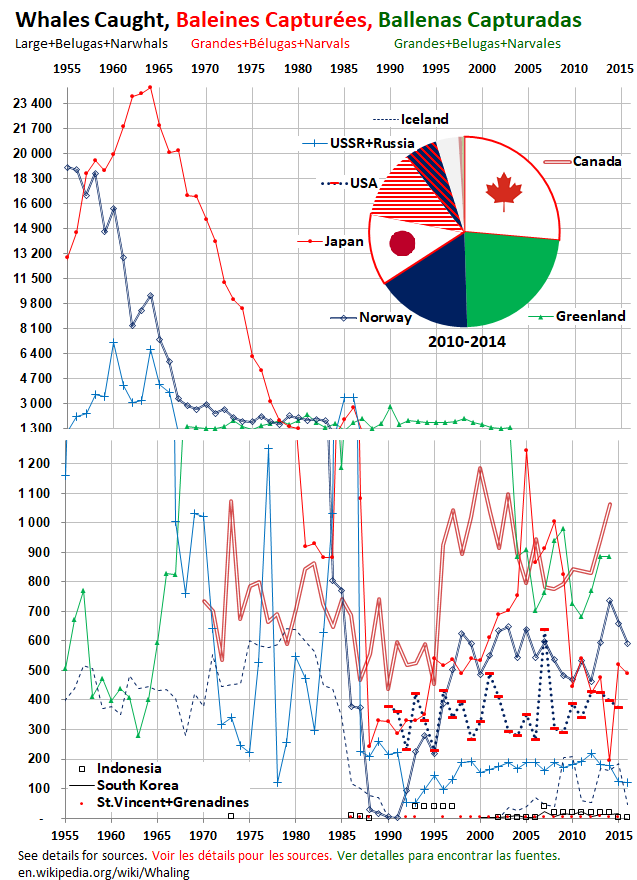
Whales caught, by country and year, 1955-2016

Icelandic whaling can be divided among two producers according to the types of whales they hunt in the North Atlantic. The company Hvalur hf. hunts Fin whales, mainly for international export. Others hunt smaller minke whales for domestic consumption.

=== Hvalur hf. - Fin whaling ===
The Icelandic company Hvalur hf. dates back to 1948 when it was established by the father of its current CEO, Kristján Loftsson. Kristján first participated in the family whaling business in 1956 at the age of 13 as a scout on his father's boat.

"Whales are just another fish for me, an abundant marine resource, nothing else."
Kristján Loftsson

The company owns four catcher ships named Hvalur 6, Hvalur 7, Hvalur 8, and Hvalur 9, with two being in active use: Hvalur 8 and Hvalur 9 have their homeport at Reykjavík Old Harbour, ironically at the same dock as many operating whale watching vessels. The other two boats, Hvalur 6 and Hvalur 7 were sunk by activists of Sea Shepherd on 9 November 1986 while moored. Both ships were lifted up a week later. While the steam engines were undamaged, the ships electrical wirings, interiors and various devices were damaged by the salt. While feasible, the ships have yet to be fully repaired and have never gone whaling after the sinking. They are now stored on dry land next to the company's whaling station in Hvalfjörður, north of Reykjavík, where they are securely anchored and connected to electricity and heating.

When whales are spotted, the catcher ships engage in pursuit. A 90 mm cannon with a grenade-tipped harpoon is fired at the target whale. A rope is trailed from the harpoon in order to prevent the whale from being lost.

Each caught whale is secured to the side of a harpoon ship with rope and later towed to a shore station located at Hvalfjörður. Once at the shore station, ropes are used to winch the carcass ashore where workers use specialized tools to butcher the whale.

The fin whale meat is exported to Japan. However, as a result of damage Japan sustained during the 2011 Tōhoku earthquake and tsunami, Hvalur hf. temporarily suspended hunting and work at the shore station. It had been resumed as of July 2013.

=== Minke whaling ===
The Hrefnuveiðimenn ehf. (Icelandic Minke Whalers Association) and another whaling company, Útgerðarfélagið Fjörður ehf, carry out the coastal hunting of minke whales for domestic consumption.

Although the minke whaling vessels also use harpoon cannons, due to the smaller size of minke whales, the boats are able to haul a caught whale on deck where the crew will butcher the animal at sea.

"We will not be exporting any minke whale meat for the time being, but hope to do so in the future. We are still building our company up and to export all the whale meat immediately was simply too much to take on."
Gunnar Bergmann Jónsson, managing director of Hrefnuveiðimenn ehf.

Minke whale meat is sold in restaurants and markets within Iceland. A large percentage of the whale meat is actually eaten by tourists.

== Scientific permit catches ==
Whales taken under IWC special permit
Year	Fin whale	Sei whale	Minke whale	Total
1986	76	40	0	116
1987	80	20	0	100
1988	68	10	0	78
1989	68	0	0	68
...	0	0	0	0
2003	0	0	37	37
2004	0	0	25	25
2005	0	0	39	39
2006	0	0	60	60
2007	0	0	39	39

== See also ==
- Keiko (orca)
