= 1986 Hvalur sinkings =

Sinking of whaling vessels by activists

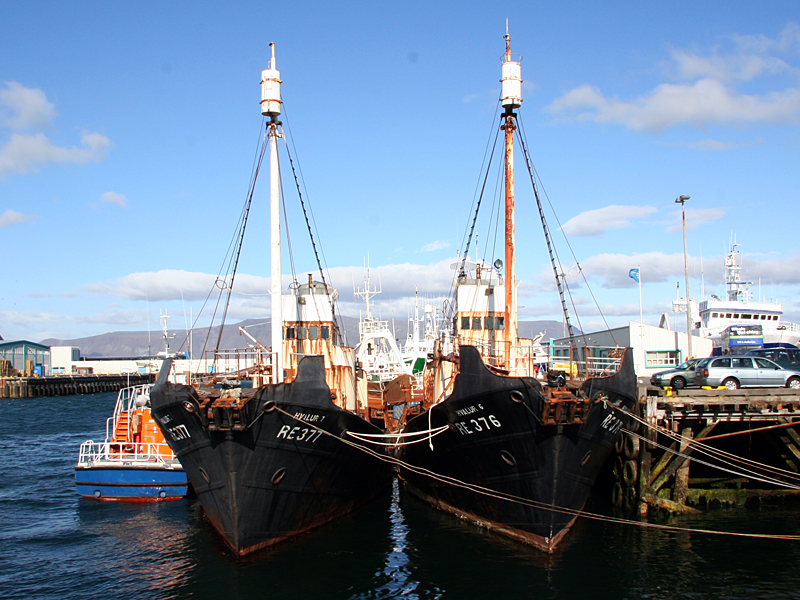
- The two vessels over 20 years after the incident
- Location: Hvalfjörður and Reykjavík, Iceland
- Date: 8 and 9 of November 1986
- Target: Iceland's whaling industry
- Deaths: 0
- Injuries: 0
- Perpetrators: Rod Coronado and David Howitt of the Sea Shepherd Conservation Society

The 1986 Hvalur sinkings occurred in Iceland's Reykjavík harbour in November 1986, when anti-whaling activists from the Sea Shepherd Conservation Society sank the unoccupied whaling vessels, Hvalur 6 and Hvalur 7, and sabotaged a whale processing station in Hvalfjörður. The ships were two of the nation's fleet of four and were eventually raised, but have not gone on a whale hunt since and were dragged onto dry land. Repairs have still not yet been made to the ships some 36 years later. The factory was the country's only processing facility.

The incident was an attempt by animal-rights activists to disrupt Iceland's whaling industry after the country circumvented a commercial ban on the practice to conduct research. No one was injured but the attack caused $2 million worth of damage to the ships, $2 million worth of damage to the processing plant, and damage to the whale meat freezer in the processing plant spoiled $4 million worth of whale meat. The perpetrators, Rod Coronado and David Howitt, were able to escape the scene via a flight to Luxembourg.

== Background ==
A moratorium on commercial whaling was implemented by the International Whaling Commission in January 1986; the ban allowed for scientific whaling to continue. The Sea Shepherd Conservation Society direct-action environmentalist group wished to intervene in the whaling continued by Iceland, Norway, the Soviet Union, Japan, and the Faroe Islands. The government of Iceland believed that taking 120 whales in 1986 for research was vital to its fishing industry. In June 1986, the plan was formulated to sabotage Iceland's whaling industry with an emphasis on causing as much economic damage as possible with the intent to act when there was no threat to human life. The operation was delayed due to a summit in Reykjavík between the governments of the United States and the Soviet Union that October. One of the perpetrators, Rod Coronado, was also allegedly involved in an attack on Faroese whalers in June.

== Operation ==
Sea Shepherd activists Rod Coronado and David Howitt flew into Reykjavík in October 1986. Howitt has also been named as David Howard, Nick Taylor or Martin Braidley. The pair stayed at a youth hostel and began covertly investigating the local whaling industry and it has been reported that they posed as tourists and took jobs at a fish factory. On 8 November, they traveled 50 miles to the nation's only whale processing station in Hvalfjörður, where they broke in at 8:00 pm. Sledgehammers, wrenches, and other common tools were used to systematically destroy computers, power generators, machinery, and windows. The large refrigeration unit used to freeze the season's catch was destroyed beyond repair and documentation at the facility was doused with acid. The main factory and two smaller buildings were left inoperable.

Coronado and Howitt then returned to Reykjavik during the early hours of 9 November where three of the country's four whalers were moored. They had no problem in boarding the boats from the dock, since the vessels were unguarded. The saltwater cooling valves in the engine room were opened at around 5:00 am, causing the ships to flood and sink within half an hour. The third whaler, Hvalur 8, was not attacked since a watchman was aboard while the fourth, Hvalur 9, was in drydock. The police did not arrive at the harbor until 7:00 am, and the attackers were able to flee the country via a 7:45 am flight to Luxembourg. They were subjects of a routine traffic stop en route to the airport but the police did not suspect them of any wrongdoing and let them continue on their way. In November the two 430-ton whaling vessels were raised from the harbor floor by a salvaging company. According to the whaling company, the attack caused $2 million worth of damage.

== Reaction ==
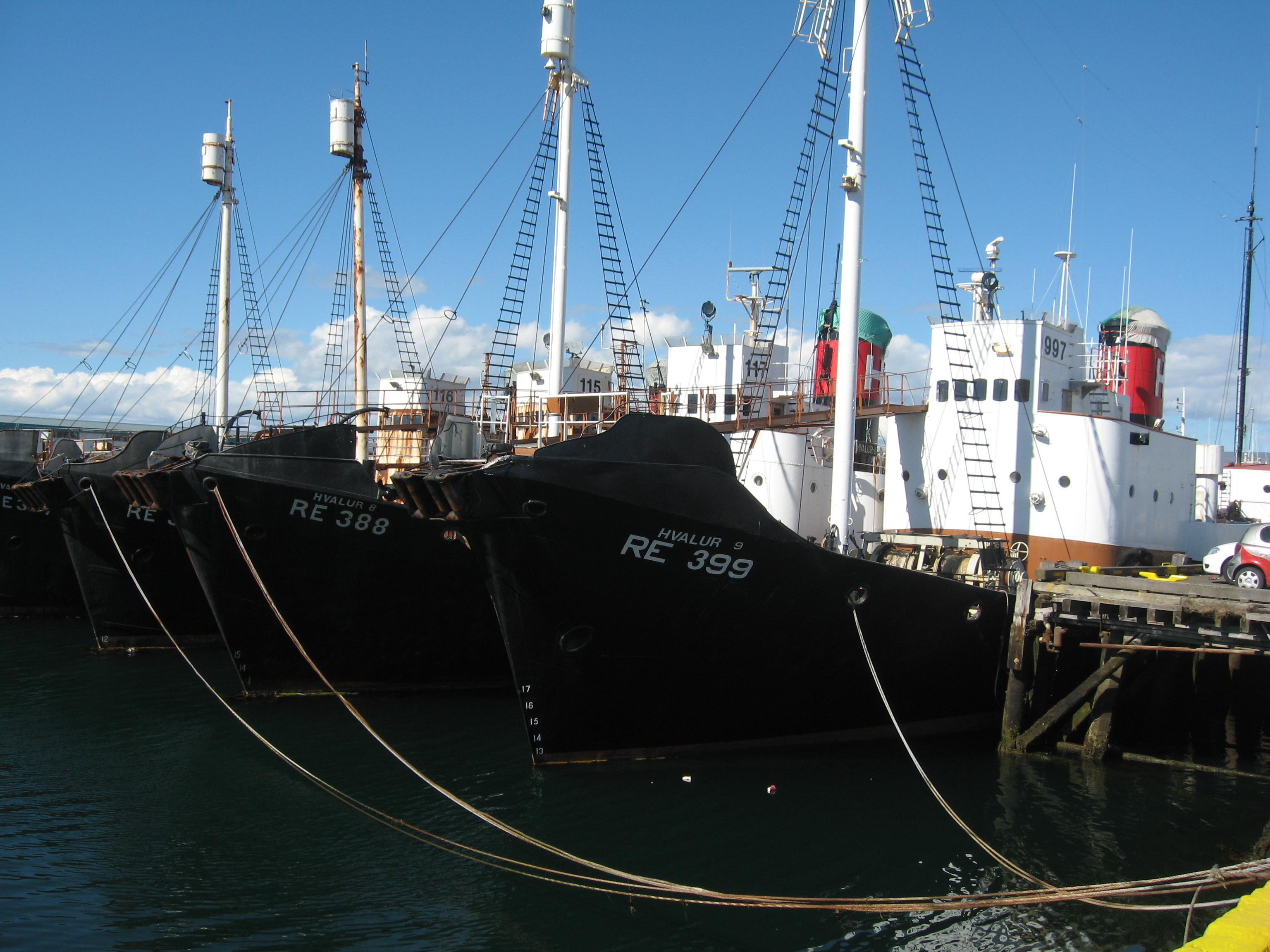
Hvalur 6, Hvalur 7, Hvalur 8, and Hvalur 9 in 2008.

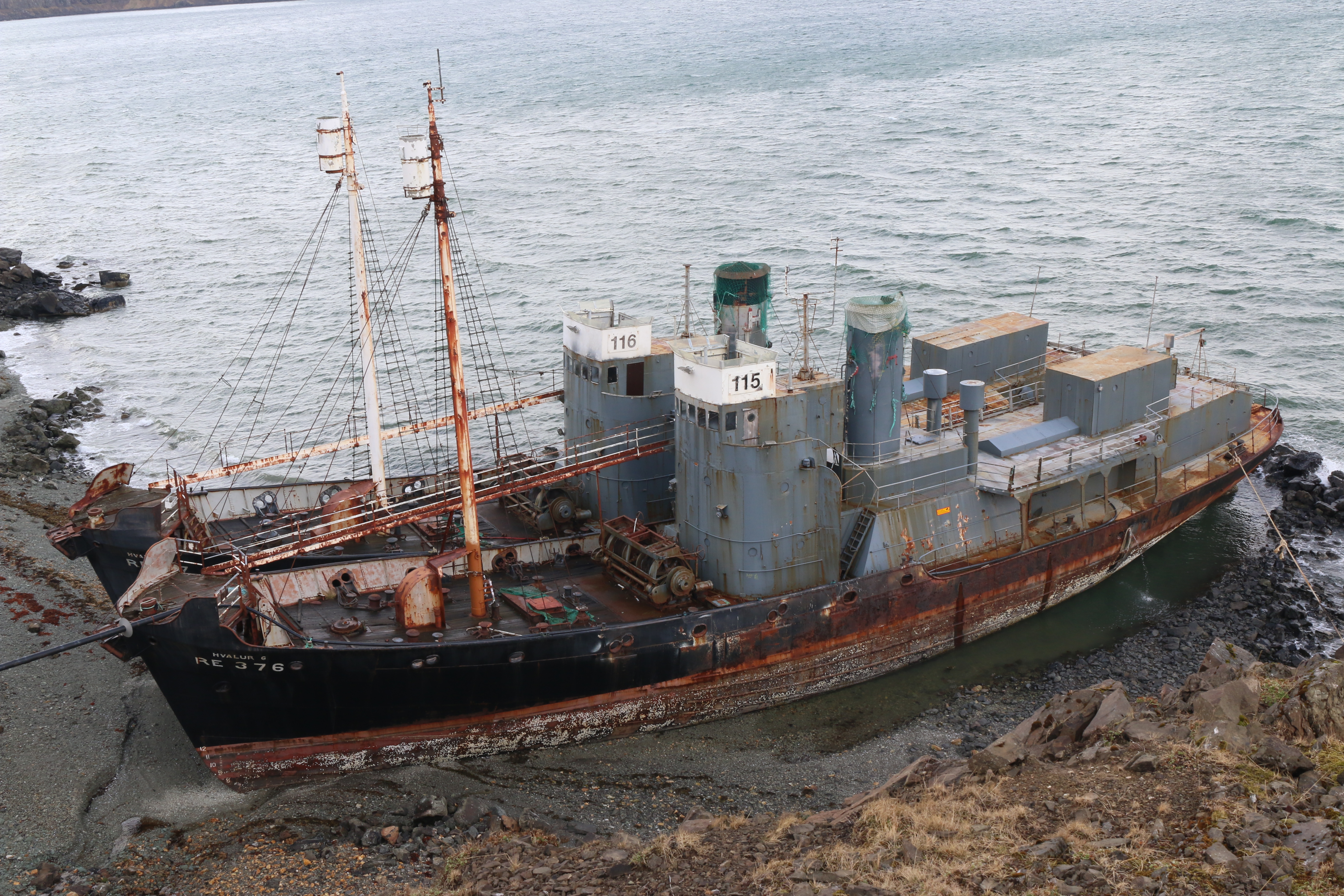
Hvalur 6 and Hvalur 7 at Hvalfjörður in 2018.

Not long after this, Paul Watson took full responsibility for the operation, saying that he had planned it, had picked the team, and had seen that the attackers did their job. Prime Minister Steingrímur Hermannsson announced that Iceland was trying to find the men and criticised the police for the initial delay that allowed them to escape. Watson travelled to Iceland in 1988 to face prosecution as Sea Shepherd's leader where he was detained for 24 hours before being deported without cause. A spokesperson for Iceland's largest whaling company told The New Yorker that Watson is persona non grata in the country. With their escape, Coronado and Howitt have never been charged with any wrong-doing in Iceland. Both have admitted responsibility but the statute of limitations for the act has passed.

As a result of this incident, the International Whaling Commission revoked Sea Shepherd's observer status. Most environmentalists, though critical of Iceland's stand, distanced themselves from Sea Shepherd's violent tactics. An article in The New Yorker said that it was "an act of sabotage that many conservationists believe helped turn Icelandic public opinion against the cause of saving whales".

The international reactions were negative. The action had various descriptions such as an act of vandalism, an act of terrorism or the act of madmen. At the time of the incident, Iceland, Greenpeace International, and some media commentators in Iceland and North America referred to the sabotage as "terrorism" or "terrorist". Coronado responded to these comparisons by arguing that the sabotage was "the farthest thing from terrorism" and that whaling itself constituted terrorism. In a Canadian newspaper the incident was also cited as one of the first steps taken by Coronado in becoming "a new breed of terrorist" who went on to wage a wide-ranging battle for animal rights as a member of the Animal Liberation Front. Coronado has rejected the "terrorist" label as "garbage", because beginning with the Hvalur sinkings, he says that he has always taken care that no one is physically hurt by his acts of sabotage.
