= Ray Gun (magazine) =

American alternative rock-and-roll magazine

- Categories: Music magazine
- Founder: Marvin Scott Jarrett
- First issue: 1992
- Final issue: 2000
- Country: USA
- Based in: Santa Monica, California
- Language: English
- ISSN: 1533-4732

Ray Gun was an American alternative rock-and-roll magazine, first published in 1992 in Santa Monica, California. Led by founding publisher Marvin Scott Jarrett, art director David Carson and executive editor Randy Bookasta, along with founding editor Neil Feineman, Ray Gun explored experimental magazine typographic design and unique angles on the pop cultural currents of the 1990s. The editorial content was framed in a chaotic, abstract "grunge typography" style, not always readable (it once published an interview with Bryan Ferry entirely in the symbol font Zapf Dingbats), but distinctive in appearance. That visual tradition continued even after Carson left the magazine after three years; he was followed by a series of art directors, including Robert Hales, Chris Ashworth, Jason Saunby, Scott Denton-Cardew, Ian Davies, Jerome Curchod & Naomi Hendry.

In terms of content, Ray Gun was also notable for its choices of subject matter. The advertising, musical artists and pop culture icons spotlighted were progressive—for example putting such artists as Radiohead, Björk, Beck, Flaming Lips, PJ Harvey and Eminem on its cover before its competitors. Those choices were guided by Executive Editor Randy Bookasta (and founding editor Neil Feineman for the first three issues), along with an editorial staff that included Dean Kuipers, Nina Malkin, Mark Blackwell, Joe Donnelly, Grant Alden, Mark Woodlief, Eric Gladstone and photographer Ian Davies.

Ray Gun produced over 70 issues from 1992 through 2000. Owner-founder-publisher Marvin Scott Jarrett (one-time publisher of a late-1980s incarnation of Creem) also later created the magazines Stick, huH, Bikini, and Nylon (a New York–based fashion magazine). The most notable common thread among all of Jarrett's magazines (from his days at Creem through Nylon) have been their focus on graphic design and music.

== Partial list of issues ==
Issue #	Date	Cover
1	November 1992	Henry Rollins
2	December 1992/January 1993	R.E.M.
3	February 1993	Dinosaur Jr.
4	March 1993	Frank Black
5	April 1993	Porno for Pyros
6	May 1993	PJ Harvey
7	June/July 1993	Sonic Youth
8	August 1993	Iggy Pop
9	September 1993	Urge Overkill
10	October 1993	Teenage Fanclub
11	November 1993	Swervedriver
12	December 1993/January 1994	L7
13	February 1994	Ministry
14	March 1994	Morrissey
15	April 1994	Elvis Costello
16	May 1994	Alice in Chains
17	June/July 1994	Perry Farrell
18	August 1994	Lush
19	September 1994	Jesus and Mary Chain
20	October 1994	Kim Deal & J Mascis
21	November 1994	Liz Phair
22	December 1994/January 1995	Keith Richards
23	February 1995	Belly
24	March 1995	Mudhoney
25	April 1995	Pavement
26	May 1995	Beastie Boys
27	June/July 1995	Björk
28	August 1995	Neil Young
29	September 1995	Flaming Lips
30	October 1995	David Bowie (Note: Final issue to be art directed by David Carson.)
31	November 1995	My Life with the Thrill Kill Kult
32	December/January 1996	Sonic Youth
33	February 1996	Smashing Pumpkins
34	March 1996	Cypress Hill
35	April 1996	Iggy Pop & Perry Farrell
36	May 1996	Rage Against the Machine
37	June/July 1996	Soundgarden
38	August 1996	Yoko Ono
39	September 1996	Beck
40	October 1996	Tricky
41	November 1996	Mazzy Star
42	December 1996/January 1997	Smashing Pumpkins
43	February 1997	Nine Inch Nails
44	March 1997	David Bowie
45	April 1997	U2
46	May 1997	Chemical Brothers
47	June/July 1997	Blur
48	August 1997	Wim Wenders & Michael Stipe
49	September 1997	Björk
50	October 1997	Oasis
51	November 1997	Jane's Addiction
52	December 1997/January 1998	Marilyn Manson
53	February 1998	Goldie
54	March 1998	Radiohead
55	April 1998	Pulp
56	May 1998	Pearl Jam
57	June/July 1998	Garbage
58	August 1998	Andy Warhol
59	September 1998	Prodigy
60	October 1998	Kiss
61	November 1998	Marilyn Manson
62	December 1998	R.E.M.
63	January 1999	Beck
64	February 1999	Fatboy Slim
65	March 1999	Underworld
66	April 1999	Shirley Manson
67	May 1999	Eminem
68	June 1999	Jamiroquai
69	July 1999	Edward Furlong
70	August 1999	Red Hot Chili Peppers
71	September 1999	Chris Cornell
72	October 1999	Missy Elliott
73	November 1999	Stone Temple Pilots
74	December 1999/January 2000	Nine Inch Nails

== See also ==
- Emigre (magazine)
- The Face (magazine)
- Print (magazine)

== Books ==
- Ray Gun: Out of Control by Dean Kuipers and Marvin Scott Jarrett, Simon & Schuster (1997), ISBN 0-684-83980-6. Design and art direction by Neil Fletcher and Chris Ashworth.
- Ray Gun: The Bible of Music and Style by Marvin Scott Jarrett, with Contributions from Steven Heller (design writer), Liz Phair, Wayne Coyne, Ian Davies and Dean Kuipers, Rizzoli (2019), ISBN 978-0-8478-6315-0.
