= Coalition to Abolish the Fur Trade =

Collective of anti-fur grassroots groups

The Coalition to Abolish the Fur Trade (CAFT) refers to a decentralised collective of grassroots groups that campaign internationally against the production and use of animal fur for clothing and other items. It started in the US in the 1990s, when fur farms were being raided during the Animal Liberation Front's Operation Bite Back.

== United Kingdom ==
In 2007 CAFT UK announced the results a two-year investigation into the use of rabbit fur. They infiltrated farms, slaughterhouses, dressing companies, manufacturers and retailers, getting photographic and video evidence of the process.

In 2008, CAFT UK ran a campaign against the London-based department store Harrods, which sold garments containing animal fur.

== United States ==
In 2024, CAFT USA played a role in pressuring Marc Jacobs to end the use of fur in his collections. Jacobs announced the change following demonstrations outside his employees' homes, denouncing the group as "radical" and the tactics as "bullying".

In August 2025, the New York Post reported that CAFT USA was organizing protests outside the homes of Vogue employees in Manhattan and Brooklyn, accusing the magazine of continuing to promote fur fashion. Protesters yelled through megaphones, chalked messages, and waved flyers labeling the employees as "killers".

== See also ==
- List of animal rights groups
