= HuH (magazine) =

American music magazine

huH was a monthly popular music magazine in the United States during the 1990s.

== History and profile ==
The magazine was published by Ray Gun Publishing, Inc. based in Santa Monica, California and owned by the Warner Music Enterprises, a subsidiary of Time Warner. It was launched in September 1994 as a new business venture concept in a mixed music sample marketing/publishing format. huH was edited by Ray Gun Publishing Editorial Director Mark Blackwell and was designed by Vaughan Oliver and Jerome Curchod. The magazine's editorial staff also included writer Dean Kuipers. huH was published on a monthly basis.

Initially, the magazine came packaged in a prototype sent by mail that included the square-ish magazine and a VHS tape with videos by artists mentioned in the magazine, all boxed up in styrofoam and sealed in plastic wrap. After marketing stabilization and a format change, the magazine included sampler CDs released on a monthly basis by genre while reviews were contained within the magazine. The format then changed to a numbered sequence with all sample songs on one CD per month.

huH mostly featured articles on rock, rap and alternative music. The magazine also included a letters section with a mostly youth audience, news briefs, and cartoons. Its large, almost square design distinguished it among other publications.

huH stopped circulating in 1996.
