= Hvalur 8 =

Icelandic whaling ship

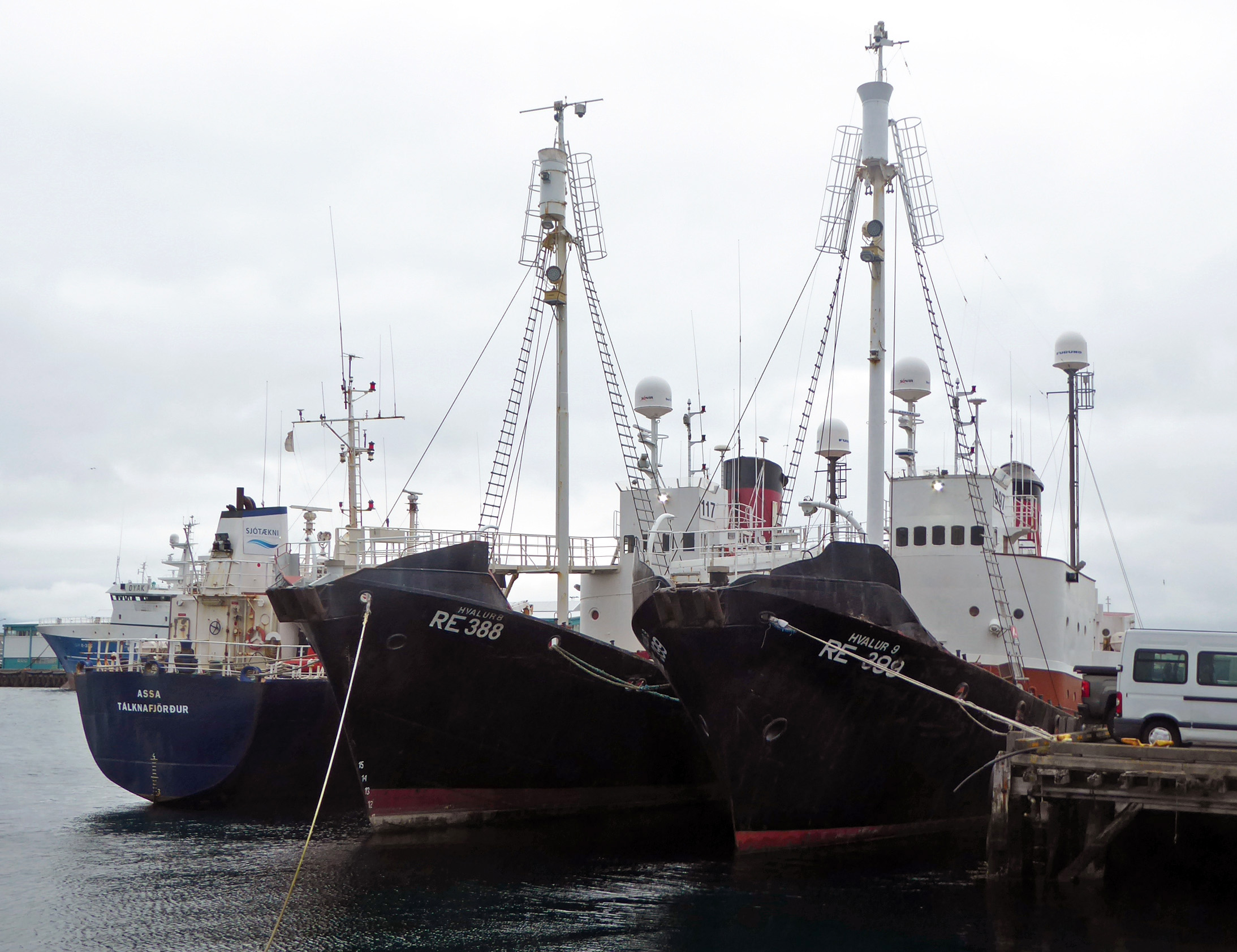
- Hvalur 8 at pier in Reykjavík along with Hvalur 9

History

Iceland
- Name: Hvalur 8
- Owner: Hvalur hf.
- Port of registry: Iceland
- Builder: Kaldnes Mekaniske Verksted, Tønsberg, Norway
- Launched: 1948
- Acquired: 1962
- Home port: Reykjavík
- Identification: IMO number: 5157341; MMSI number: 251605000; Callsign: TFDV
- Status: in active service
- Notes: Operated by the Coast Guard during the second Cod War

History

Iceland
- Name: Hvalur 8
- Operator: Icelandic Coast Guard
- Commissioned: 1973
- Decommissioned: 1974
- Identification: RE-388, fisheries registration
- Fate: Returned in 1974
- Notes: Leased during the second Cod War

General characteristics
- Type: Whaler
- Tonnage: 460.95 GRT
- Length: 48.16 m (158 ft 0 in) o/a
- Beam: 8.88 m (29 ft 2 in)
- Draft: 5.19 m (17 ft 0 in)
- Propulsion: Steam engine

Hvalur 8 is an Icelandic whaling ship built in 1948 in Norway. It has been a part of the Icelandic whaling fleet operated and owned by the company Hvalur hf. since 1962.

In 1973 she was requisitioned by the Icelandic Coast Guard, repainted and armed with a cannon and subsequently used as a patrol vessel during the Second Cod War dispute with the United Kingdom. Unlike its sister ship, Hvalur 9 which was renamed Týr, Hvalur 8 kept its name while in the ICG service. It was returned to its owner by June 1974.

Between 1987 and 2006, commercial whaling ceased in Iceland and the whaling ships remained unused at pier. After 20-years of inactivity, Hvalur 8 was brought back into action in June 2009. As of 2022, the ship remains active.
