= Operation Bite Back: Rod Coronado's War to Save American Wilderness =

2009 book by Dean Kuipers

Operation Bite Back
- Author: Dean Kuipers
- Subject: Activism
- Publisher: Bloomsbury
- Publication date: 2009
- Pages: 295
- ISBN: 9781608191420

Operation Bite Back: Rod Coronado's War to Save American Wilderness is a 2009 book by Dean Kuipers on the activism of Rod Coronado.
