= Hvalur hf. =

Icelandic commercial whaling and holding company

- Type: Public company
- Industry: Holding company, commercial whaling
- Founded: 1947 in Reykjavík, Iceland
- Founders: Loftur Bjarnason, Vilhjálmur Árnason
- Key people: Kristján Loftsson (CEO)

Hvalur hf. (Note: hf. stands for hlutafélag (lit. 'shares partnership', cf. limited liability company).) (Icelandic pronunciation: [ˈkʰvaːlʏr̥], lit. 'Whale') is an Icelandic commercial whaling and holding company. Hvalur hf. was founded in 1947 as a commercial whaling company by Loftur Bjarnason and Vilhjálmur Árnason and later run by their sons, Kristján Loftsson and Árni Vilhjálmsson. In the recent decades, it has become one of the largest investment companies in Iceland, having owned large shares in Arion Bank, Marel, Origo hf. and Brim hf. amongst others.

In 1948, the company purchased an American naval base at Hvalfjörður (Whale Fjord) and converted it into a whaling station. Norwegian crews were involved in training Icelandic whalers into the early 1950s.

== Whaling fleet ==
The company currently operates two whaling ships, Hvalur 8 and Hvalur 9. It further owns two more, Hvalur 6 and Hvalur 7, that were never fully repaired following the 1986 Hvalur sinkings.

=== Ships history ===
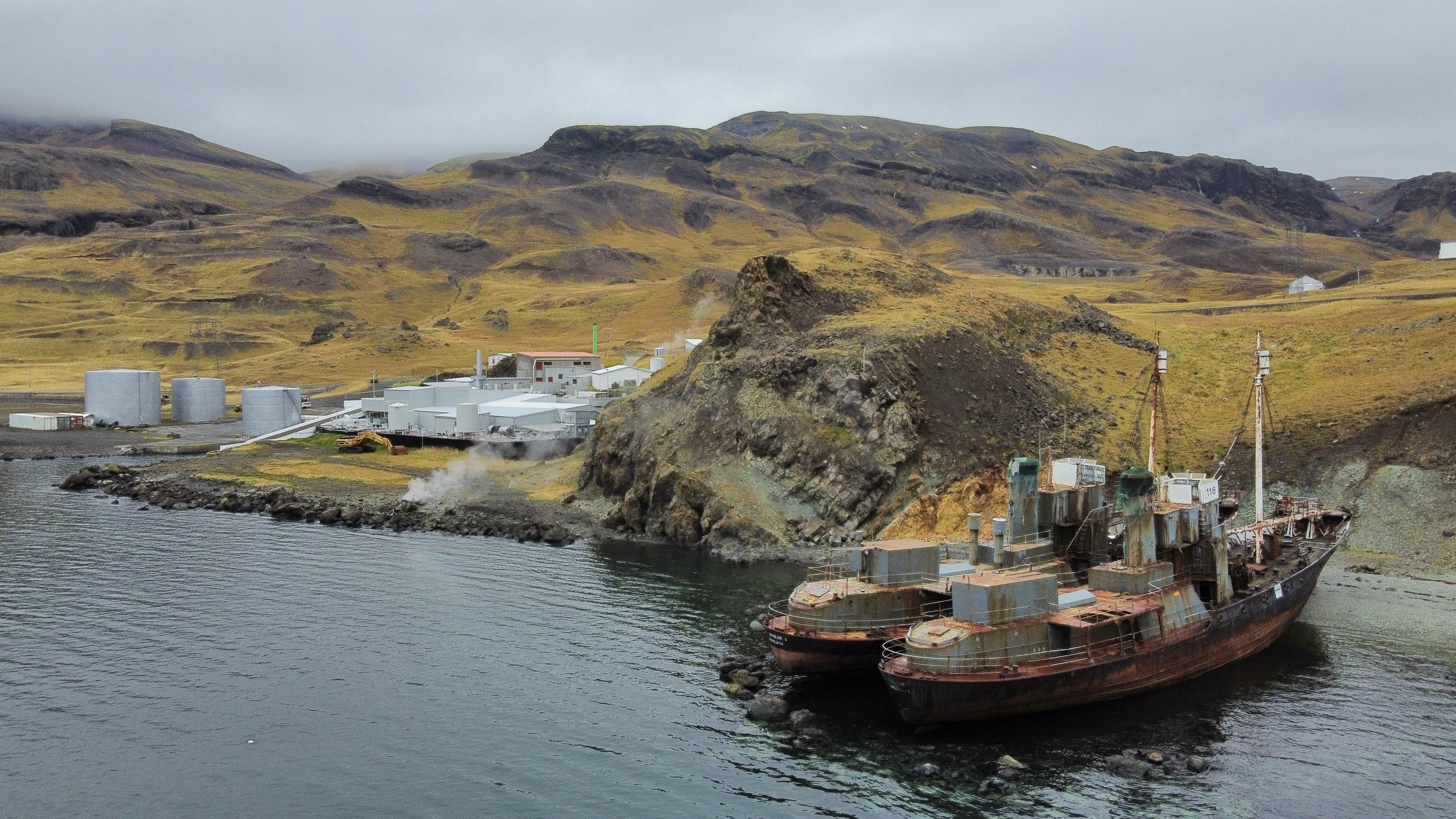
The Hvalur hf. whaling station in Hvalfjörður ('Whale Fjord'). Beside it lie the mothballed Hvalur 6 and Hvalur 7.

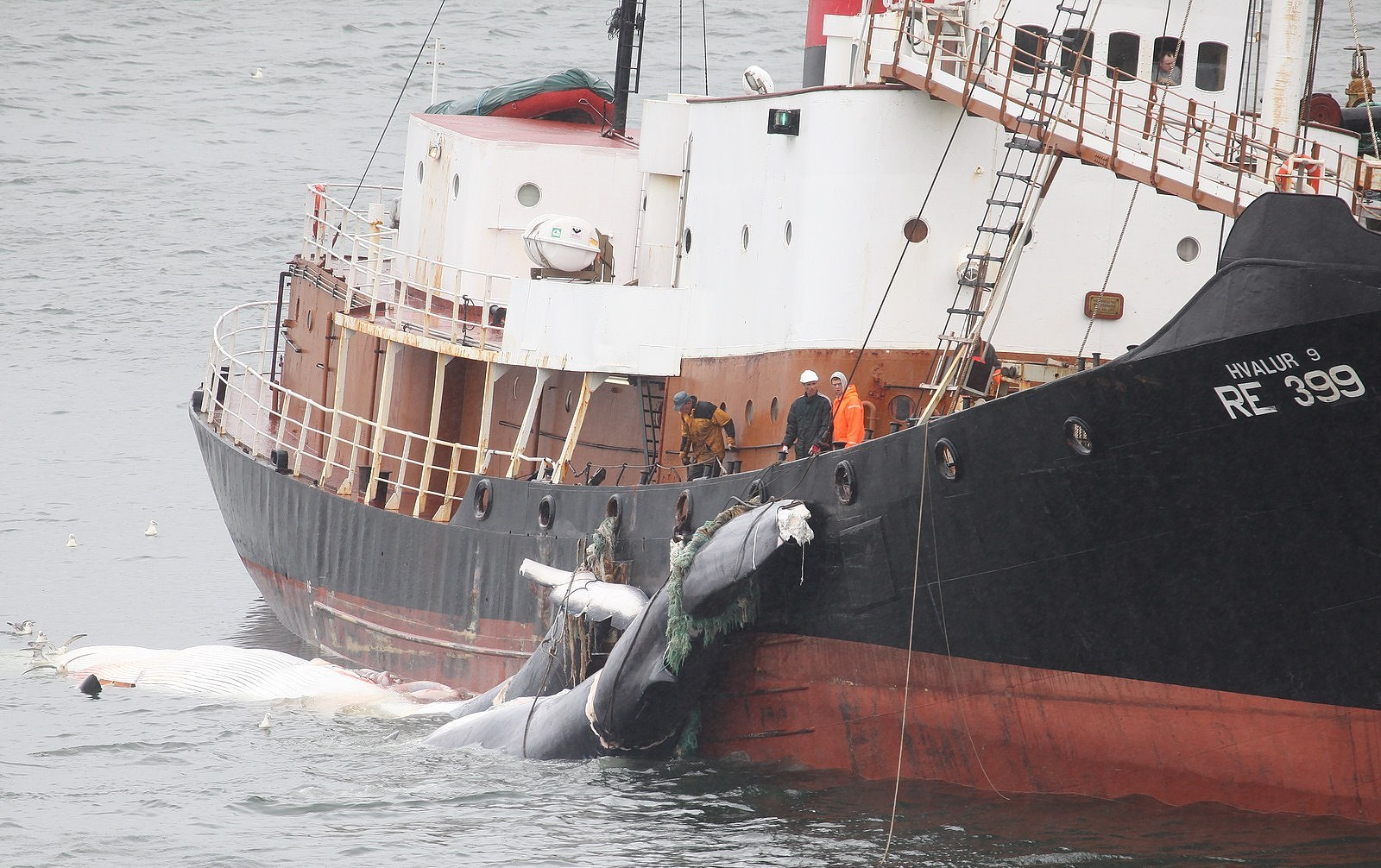
Hvalur 9 with its catch.

- Hvalur 1- Arrived in 1949.
- Hvalur 2 - Sold to Síldarverksmiðjur Ríkisins in 1962 and moved to Seyðisfjörður where its steam engine was used to produce steam for a herring smelt factory.
- Hvalur 3 - Sold to Síldarverksmiðjur Ríkisins in 1962 and moved to Seyðisfjörður where its steam engine was used to produce steam for a herring smelt factory.
- Hvalur 4
- Hvalur 5 - Bought in 1955 and sold to the Faroe Islands in 1968. On display in the German Maritime Museum in Bremerhaven, Germany.
- Hvalur 6 - Arrived in 1961. Currently in storage as of 2022.
- Hvalur 7 - Arrived in 1961. Currently in storage as of 2022.
- Hvalur 8 - Acquired in 1962. In active use as of 2022.
- Hvalur 9 - Acquired in 1966. In active use as of 2022.

== Controversies ==
In 2018, Hvalur hf. faced criticism for killing two potential blue whale/fin whale hybrids and several pregnant fin whales, which were endangered. The company's killing of the pregnant whales was reportedly accidental. As of late August 2018, they had killed 109 fin whales, 14 of which were pregnant.

On 20 June 2023, the Icelandic Minister of Fisheries, Svandís Svavarsdóttir, temporarily halted whaling until 31 August 2023 due to alleged violations of the Icelandic Animal Welfare Act by whalers of Hvalur ehf. On 1 September the same year, whaling resumed again with stricter conditions.
