= Dean Kuipers =

American journalist & author (born 1964)

- Born: March 1964 (age 62); Seattle, Washington, U.S.
- Education: Kalamazoo College (BA)
- Occupations: Journalist, writer
- Writing career
- Period: 1987–present
- Genre: Non-fiction
- Notable works: Operation Bite Back; Burning Rainbow Farm
- Website: www.deankuipersonline.com

Dean Kuipers (born March 1964) is an American journalist and author. He is best known for his writing on the environment. His book Burning Rainbow Farm was selected as a 2007 Michigan Notable Book. His other prominent work includes Operation Bite Back, a non-fiction book about activist Rod Coronado and the use of domestic terrorism charges against environmentalists in the United States.

== Early life and education ==
Kuipers was born in the Seattle area, where his father was serving in the United States Air Force. He lived in Marysville, Washington and Everett, Washington before his family relocated to West Michigan. He earned a degree in English from Kalamazoo College in 1987.

== Career ==
In 1987 Kuipers moved to New York City to work at Ear Magazine, an avant-garde music publication. He became a staff writer at Spin in 1989. He also reported on local politics, and he and a girlfriend were beaten by police while he was covering the Tompkins Square Park riot in 1988.

In 1994, Kuipers moved to Los Angeles to work for Ray Gun, where he helped launch several other lifestyle titles. He worked with artist Doug Aitken on his 1997 film, Diamond Sea, and other films. He became the founding news editor of alternative newsweekly LA CityBeat in 2004. His non-fiction book Burning Rainbow Farm tells the story of Tom Crosslin and Rollie Rohm, Michigan marijuana activists who were killed by the Federal Bureau of Investigation and Michigan State Police officers a standoff in 2001. He joined the Los Angeles Times in 2007 as a digital edition editor, then worked as a music editor and ran Greenspace, a blog operated by the city of Seattle. He remained with the company until 2012.

His work has also appeared in Playboy, Rolling Stone, Men's Journal, Orion, Interview, Travel & Leisure, Outside, LA Weekly, and other publications.

== Selected work ==
- Kuipers, Dean; Aitken, Doug (2000). I Am a Bullet : Scenes from an Accelerating Culture. Crown; 1st edition. ISBN 978-0609604090.
- Kuipers, Dean (2006). Burning Rainbow Farm: How a Stoner Utopia Went Up in Smoke. Bloomsbury USA. ISBN 978-1596911420.
- Kuipers, Dean (2009). Operation Bite Back: Rod Coronado's War to Save American Wilderness. Bloomsbury USA. ISBN 978-1596914582.

=== As editor and contributor ===
- Kuipers, Dean (1997). Ray Gun: Out of Control. Simon & Schuster. ISBN 978-0684839806.
- Kuipers, Dean (2001). I am Iman. Universe Publishing. ISBN 9780789306333.
- Kuipers, Dean (2019). Ray Gun: The Bible of Music and Style. Rizzoli. ISBN 978-0-8478-6315-0.

=== As contributor ===
- Aitken, Doug (1998). Douglas Aitken Diamond Sea. Book Works, London. ISBN 9781870699464.
- Laura, Flanders (2007). The Contenders. Seven Stories Press. ISBN 978-1583227893.
- Frank, Joshua (2008). Red State Rebels: Tales of Grassroots Resistance in the Heartland. AK Press. ISBN 9781904859840.
- Doug Aitken: SONG 1. Hirshhorn Museum and Sculpture Garden. 2012. ISBN 9780978906320
- Signs of Life. Manic D Press, 1994. Jennifer Joseph.
- Acker, Kathy (1991). Black Ice Anthology Number 8.

=== Films ===
- True Guardians of the Earth, documentary directed by Eric Matthias (2010)
- Doug Aitken films Diamond Sea, Bad Animal, These Restless Minds, and Into the Sun (Research, writing and production) 1996–99

== Awards ==
- 2018 Best of the West award in business and financial reporting
- 2007 Michigan Notable Book
