= Fotografiks =

- Author: David Carson
- Original title: An Equilibrium Between Photography and Design Through Graphic Expression That Evolves from Content
- Language: English
- Publication date: 1999
- Publication place: United States
- Media type: Print (paperback)
- ISBN: 1-85669-171-3

Fotografiks is a book by David Carson published in 1999.
