= Thomas Welcome Roys =

American whaleman (c. 1815 – 1877)

Thomas Welcome Roys (c. 1816 - d. 1877) was an American whaleman. He was significant in the history of whaling in that he discovered the Western Arctic bowhead whale population and developed and patented whaling rockets in order to hunt the faster, more powerful species that had until then eluded European whalers.

== Open-boat whaling ==
On 23 July 1848, in the Sag Harbor bark Superior, he sailed from the north Pacific through the Bering Strait and into the Arctic Ocean, where he discovered an abundance of "new fangled monsters" (bowhead whales). The following season fifty whalers (forty-six Yankee, two German, and two French vessels) sailed to the Bering Strait region on Roys's success alone.

Roys, in the Cold Spring Harbor vessel Sheffield, spent the summers of 1851-1853 cruising in the Sea of Okhotsk, obtaining in all over 4,500 barrels of oil.

== Rorqual whaling ==
=== Iceland and other Atlantic hunting grounds ===
In 1855, while cruising south of Iceland in the 441-ton Hannibal, he was able to kill a "sulphurbottom" (blue whale) with a Brown's bomb gun. He realized that if he had a better way to dispatch such large rorquals, he could easily fill his ship's hold with whale oil. Due to his ship having taken a beating in a heavy gale in these waters, he was forced to put into Lorient, France. While there, he ordered for "two rifles in pairs for killing [rorqual] whales," staying long enough to see them nearly completed, then leaving for home in a steamship, and, when finished, having the guns sent by way of England to the US.

The following spring, he went out in the 175-ton brig William F. Safford to test his experimental whaling guns. The guns Roys had ordered from France were lost on the voyage out, so he had to persuade C. C. Brand of Norwich, Connecticut., to let him use his bomb lance, but to increase his bomb missiles to three pounds in order to ensure greater success. Roys sailed to Bjørnøya, where he encountered vast numbers of blue, fin, and humpbacks. He fired at around sixty, with only a single blue whale being saved. He then sailed to Novaya Zemlya, capturing two humpbacks there. After cruising off Russia and Norway, he came to anchor at Queenstown, Ireland, and thence went to England to reconstruct his lost French-made guns. He had Sir Joseph Whitworth manufacture him some rifled whaling guns and shells. Roys returned to his ship, sailing from Queenstown on 26 November for the Bay of Biscay. Here, when testing one of the guns, he blew off his left hand, having to amputate it "as well as we could with razors." They sailed to Oporto, Portugal, where Roys's lower arm had to be amputated.

Having failed in securing whales on another cruise in 1857, Roys redesigned his gun. This time, the rocket-powered harpoons proved too weak to penetrate the whales correctly. Undaunted, he made another cruise, this time to South Georgia, but he wasn't able to take any whales. He cruised north to put into Lisbon, sailed to Africa, then west to the West Indies in early 1859, where he was able to capture several humpbacks.

In 1861 Roys joined forces with the wealthy New York pyrotechnic manufacturer Gustavus Adolphus Lilliendahl in order to perfect his "whaling rocket". In mid-May 1862 Lilliendahl purchased the 158-ton bark Reindeer, appointing Roys as her master. Unfortunately, she was seized on suspicion of being a slaving ship, and when everything was finally cleared up, she sailed to Iceland, but arrived too late for the summer whaling season, and had to return home and wait until next year.

In 1863 Roys refitted the Reindeer and once again sailed to Iceland, but he damaged his rudder while off the coast of the island, and was only able to save one of the many whales he shot that season. Roys was much more successful the following season of 1864, saving eleven of the twenty whales that were shot, in part because he was using stronger harpoons and better lines. In November 1864 Roys obtained the rights to establish a shore station on the coast of Iceland from the Danish government. He acquired the twelve-ton, sixty-two-foot iron steamer Visionary in Scotland, and returned to Iceland in the spring of 1865. He arrived at Seydisfjordur on 14 May, finding his bark Reindeer had already arrived there in April, loaded with whaling equipment, boilers, steam engines, timber, bricks, and everything necessary for the construction of his shore station. Lilliendahl supplied them with defective rockets, and before the station was built, they were forced to tow the dead whales to the Reindeer, where they were flensed and processed the old fashioned way.

After his rockets were rebuilt, Roys and his crew set out in the Visionary, with whaleboats in tow astern, to search for rorquals. Once a whale was sighted, the crews went to their respective boats, and if a whale was successfully captured, they'd heave the carcass to the surface with a steam winch, fasten it to the side of the ship, and tow it back to Seydisfjordur. For the 1865 season they took twenty or more whales, but also lost another twenty. The next season, 1866, he used the Sileno and the iron steamers Staperaider and Vigilant- identical ship, bark-rigged, 116-feet long, each carrying two whaleboats and equipped with steam tryworks and powerful winches to bring aboard large strips of blubber when flensing whales. They killed ninety whales this season, with forty-three or forty-four being saved to produce 3,000 barrels of oil. Roys and Lilliendahl parted company at the end of the season, with Lilliendahl continuing on in Iceland for another year. Using the Vigilant and Staperaider, he only caught thirty-six whales. After this season, he departed as well.

=== British Columbia ===
In 1868 Roys chartered the 83-three-foot, 25-ton steamer Emma to catch whales in British Columbian waters. His first cruise was a disaster, while the second cruise from early September to October he reportedly struck four whales, killing three, but lost all three in dense fogs. Persistent as ever, Roys formed the Victoria Whaling Adventurers Company on 22 October, and in January 1869 he sent the Emma to erect a shore station in Barkley Sound, Vancouver Island. Again, Roys was met with by failure, having made fast to only one whale. The harpoon broke free, and the whale escaped.

The next season, seemingly undeterred, Roys returned to British Columbia in the 179-ton brig Byzantium on 10 May 1871. He constructed a station at Cumshewa Inlet in the Queen Charlotte Islands, and fitted out the Byzantium with proper onboard tryworks. As usual, Roys fared poorly. The Byzantium struck the rocks in Weynton Passage, Johnstone Strait, forcing the men to abandon her and row ashore, to spend a frigid night huddled on the beach. Roys never operated a whaling company again.

== Death ==
Roys shipped aboard a vessel in San Diego and contracted yellow fever. He was put ashore in Mazatlan, where he died in abject poverty on 29 January 1877 of a stroke.
