= David Carson (graphic designer) =

American graphic designer (born 1955)

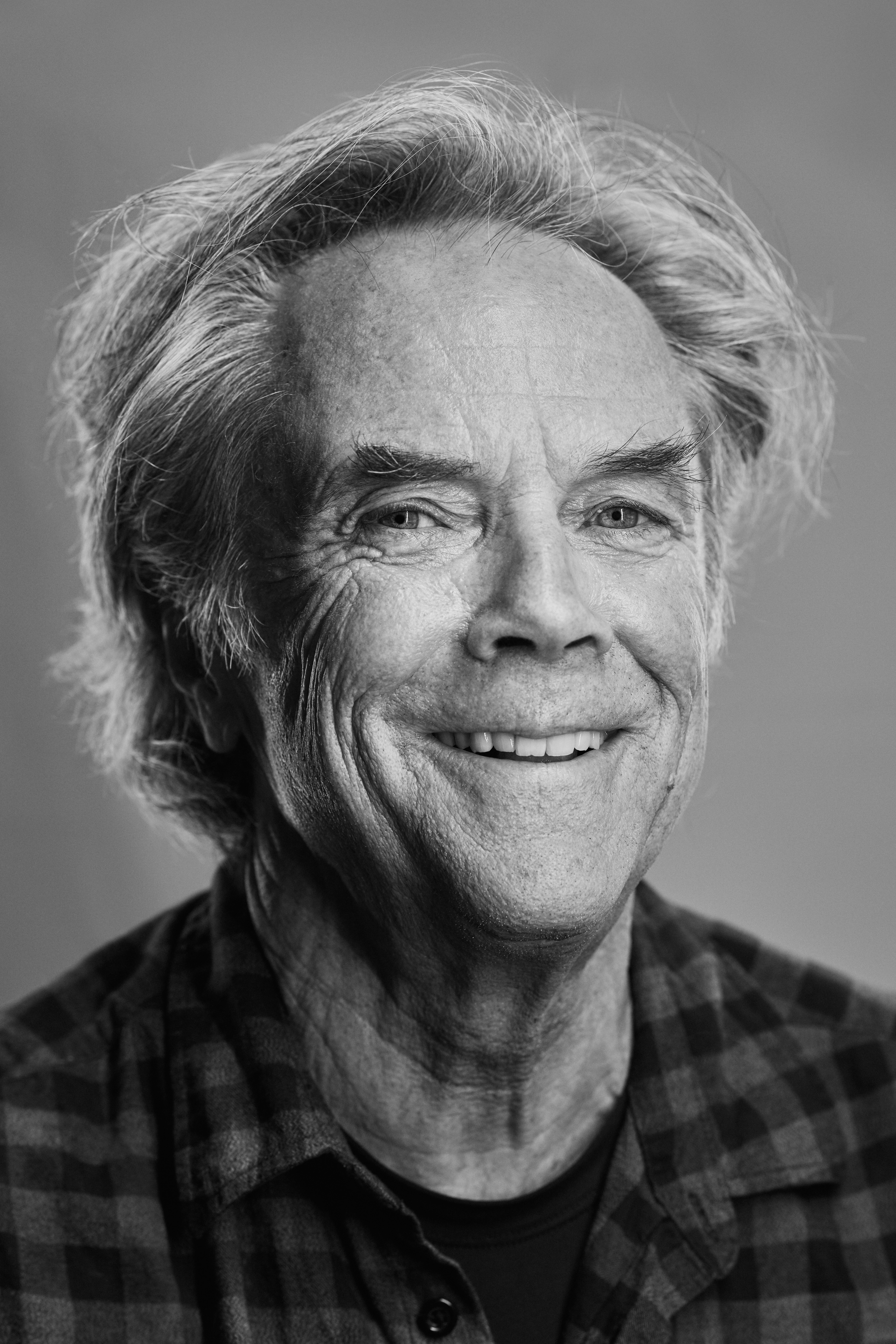
- Carson in 2019
- Born: September 8, 1955 (age 70); Corpus Christi, Texas, U.S.
- Education: San Diego State University (BA)
- Occupations: Graphic designer; design director
- Website: davidcarsondesign.com

David Carson (born September 8, 1955) is an American graphic designer and design director.

== Early life and career ==
Carson was born on September 8, 1955, in Corpus Christi, Texas. Graduating from Rolling Hills High School, he continued his education and graduated from San Diego State University with a Bachelor of Arts in Sociology. Carson attended the Oregon College of Commercial Art studying graphic design and went to Switzerland for a workshop as a part of his degree.

== Career ==
Carson was a professional surfer before finding employment with Self and Musician magazine. He then worked at Transworld Skateboarding for four years. During that time, he became the art director of the magazine and edited their layouts. His 'dirty' photographic techniques emerged during his time there. Carson was then hired as an art director at Beach Culture in 1989. Though the magazine ended after six issues, Carson established a reputation for himself.

Three years later Carson was hired by Ray Gun magazine, where he stayed for three years. His style was chaotic and collage-like, with layering of photos and messy typography. Most of his work was shown in his covers that were eye-catching with the purpose to visually communicate with everyone, especially young readers and big corporations. During the early 1990s, digital media started to get impacted with Modernism. Carson took advantage of this and stated, "It's the basic decisions—images, cropping and appropriate font and design choices—that make design work, not having the ability to overlap or play with opacity." Ray Gun was the platform that Carson's visual concepts made famous. Looking back to that time Carson explains, "Graphic design seems a bit stagnant now, and a lot of people and ideas have gone to other areas of expression."

Carson later created his own design firm, David Carson Design. While working independently, he signed contracts with Nike, Pepsi Cola, Ray Ban, Levi Strauss, and MTC Global. He published a collection of his own graphic works in his books: The End of Print: The Graphic Design of David Carson, 2nd Sight, Trek and Fotografiks.

In 1999, he helped create the cover art and graphics for Nine Inch Nails’ The Fragile album.

== Notable awards ==
Carson received the AIGA medal in 2014. He received this award for forging graphic design into a cultural form with his own shape and direction.

== Bibliography ==
- Carson, David (1995). The End of Print: The Graphic Design of David Carson. Chronicle Books. ISBN 0-8118-1199-9.
- Carson, David (1997). David Carson: 2nd Sight: Grafik Design After the End of Print. Universe Publishing. ISBN 0-7893-0128-8.
- Meggs, Phillip B.; David Carson (1999). Fotografiks: An Equilibrium Between Photography and Design Through Graphic Expression That Evolves from Content. Laurence King. ISBN 1-85669-171-3.
- Carson, David (2003). Trek: David Carson, Recent Werk. Gingko Press. ISBN 1-58423-046-0.
