= Kristján Loftsson =

Icelandic Businessman and whaler

- Born: 17 March 1943 (age 83); Hafnarfjörður, Iceland
- Education: Wales College Advanced Technology
- Occupations: Businessman, Whaler

Kristján Loftsson (born 17 March 1943) is an Icelandic businessman and a whaler. He has been the CEO of the commercial whaling and investment company Hvalur hf. since 1974 and is, along with his sister, its largest shareholder.

He began his whaling career in 1956 at the age of 13 as a scout on his father's ship. In 1974, he took over as CEO of Hvalur hf., following the death of his father.

== Personal life ==
Kristján was born in Hafnarfjörður, Iceland, to Loftur Bjarnason and Sólveig Sveinbjarnardóttir. He is named after his uncle Kristján Bjarnason who was killed in the sinking of SS Hekla by German submarine U-564 in 1941.
