= Hvalur 6 =

Whaler built in 1946

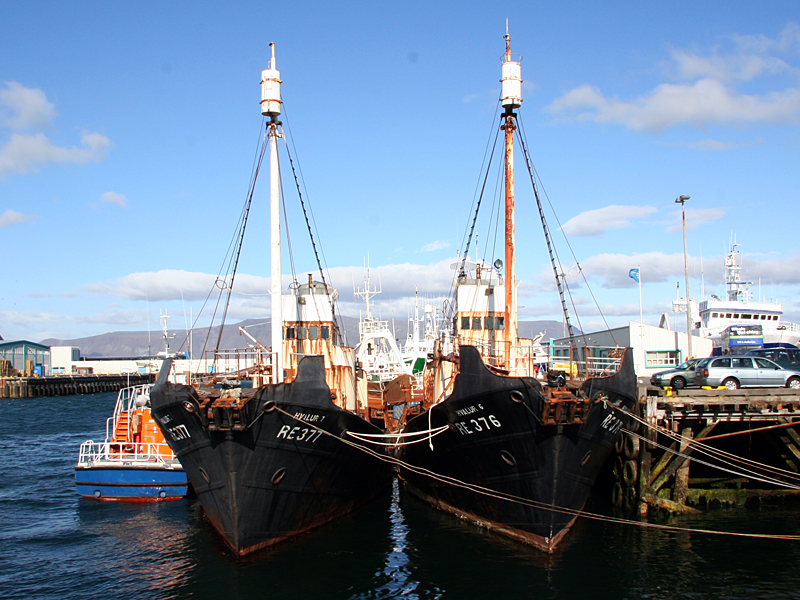
- Hvalur 6 at pier in Reykjavík along with Hvalur 7 in 2009

History

Iceland
- Name: Hvalur 6
- Owner: Hvalur hf.
- Port of registry: Iceland
- Builder: Smith's Dock Company, Middlesbrough, England
- Acquired: 1961
- Out of service: 1986
- Home port: Reykjavík
- Identification: IMO number: 5157327; RE-399, fisheries registration
- Status: In storage

General characteristics
- Type: Whaler
- Tonnage: 433.88 GRT
- Length: 45.29 m (148 ft 7 in) o/a
- Beam: 8.42 m (27 ft 7 in)
- Draft: 4.91 m (16 ft 1 in)
- Propulsion: Steam engine

Hvalur 6 is an Icelandic whaling ship built in 1946 in England by Smith's Dock Company. It has been a part of the Icelandic whaling fleet operated and owned by the company Hvalur hf. since 1961. It was bought, along with its sister ship Hvalur 7, to replace the aging Hvalur 2 and Hvalur 3 which were built between 1920 and 1930.

== 1986 sinking ==
In November 1986, Hvalur 6 along with Hvalur 7 were sunk in Reykjavík harbour by anti-whaling activists from the Sea Shepherd Conservation Society. Both ships were raised a few days later, but have not gone on a whale hunt since. While the steam engines where undamaged, the ships electrical wirings, interiors and various devices where damaged by the salt. While feasible, the ships have yet to be fully repaired and have never gone whaling after the sinking. As of 2015, they are stored on dry land next to the company's whaling station in Hvalfjörður, north of Reykjavík, where they are securely anchored and connected to electricity and heating.

== Notable captains ==
- Ingólfur Þórðarson
