= Hvalur 7 =

Whaler built in 1945

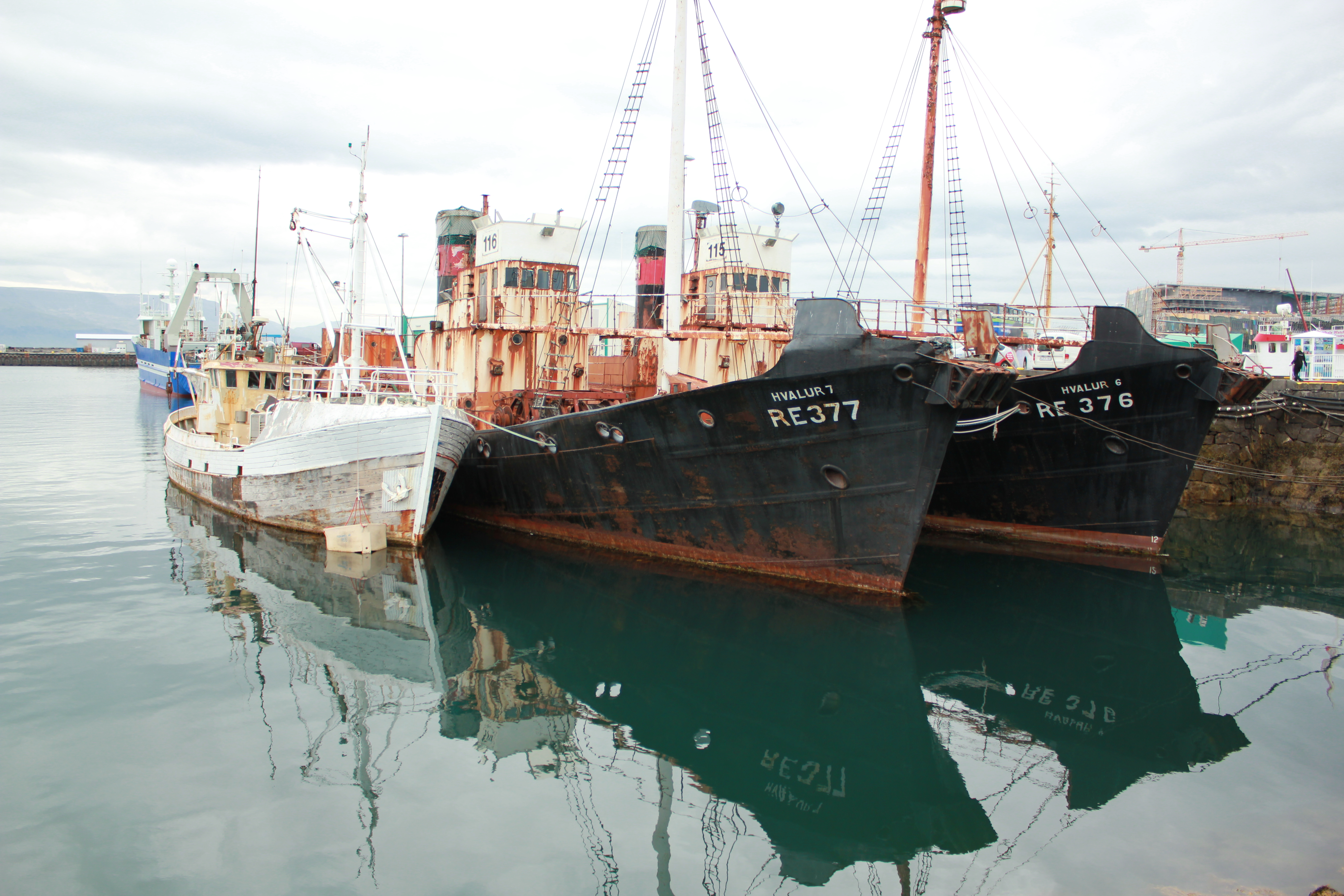
- Hvalur 7 at pier in Reykjavík alongside Hvalur 6 in 2010

History

Iceland
- Name: Hvalur 7
- Owner: Hvalur hf.
- Port of registry: Iceland
- Builder: Smith's Dock Company, Middlesbrough, England
- Launched: 7 October 1945
- Acquired: 1961
- Out of service: 1986
- Home port: Reykjavík
- Identification: IMO number: 5157339; RE-377, fisheries registration
- Status: In storage

General characteristics
- Type: Whaler
- Tonnage: 426.58 GRT
- Length: 48.32 m (158 ft 6 in) o/a
- Beam: 8.42 m (27 ft 7 in)
- Draft: 4.91 m (16 ft 1 in)
- Propulsion: Steam engine

Hvalur 7 is an Icelandic whaling ship built in 1945 in England by Smith's Dock Company. It has been a part of the Icelandic whaling fleet operated and owned by the company Hvalur hf. since 1961. It was bought, along with its sister ship Hvalur 6, to replace the aging Hvalur 2 and Hvalur 3 which were built between 1920 and 1930. In 1965, the ship participated in the first Icelandic scientific expedition to tag whales.

The ship was previously named Southern Wilcox and operated by The South Georgia Company in Leith, Scotland from 1945 to 1961.

== 1986 sinking ==
In November 1986, Hvalur 7 along with Hvalur 6 were sunk in Reykjavík harbour by anti-whaling activists from the Sea Shepherd Conservation Society. Both ships were raised a few days later. While the steam engines where undamaged, the ships electrical wirings, interiors and various devices where damaged by the salt. While feasible, the ships have yet to be fully repaired and have never gone whaling after the sinking. As of 2015, they are stored on dry land next to the company's whaling station in Hvalfjörður, north of Reykjavík, where they are securely anchored and connected to electricity and heating.

== Notable captains ==
- Friðbert Elí Gíslason
