= Operation Bite Back =

Anti-fur industry campaign in the U.S.

Operation Bite Back is a multi-phase Animal Liberation Front campaign targeting the American fur industry in the 1990s. Participants firebombed research laboratories and fur farms in Michigan, Utah, and the Pacific Northwest from June 1991 through 1992. The campaign was known nationally and led to the creation of the 1992 Animal Enterprise Protection Act to criminalize the damage of animal enterprise property. Following Rod Coronado's 1994 arrest, the 1995 Operation Bite Back II campaign abandoned their former economic sabotage tactics and instead focused on animal liberation. Their Arritola Mink Farm raid in Mt. Angel, Oregon, released 10,000 mink, the largest animal liberation to date. The campaign was still continuing by 2015.
