= Wolf Patrol =

American wildlife conservation organization

Wolf Patrol is a wildlife conservation organization seeking to protect the grey wolves of the contiguous United States. It was established in 2014.
