= Hvalur 9 =

Icelandic whaling ship

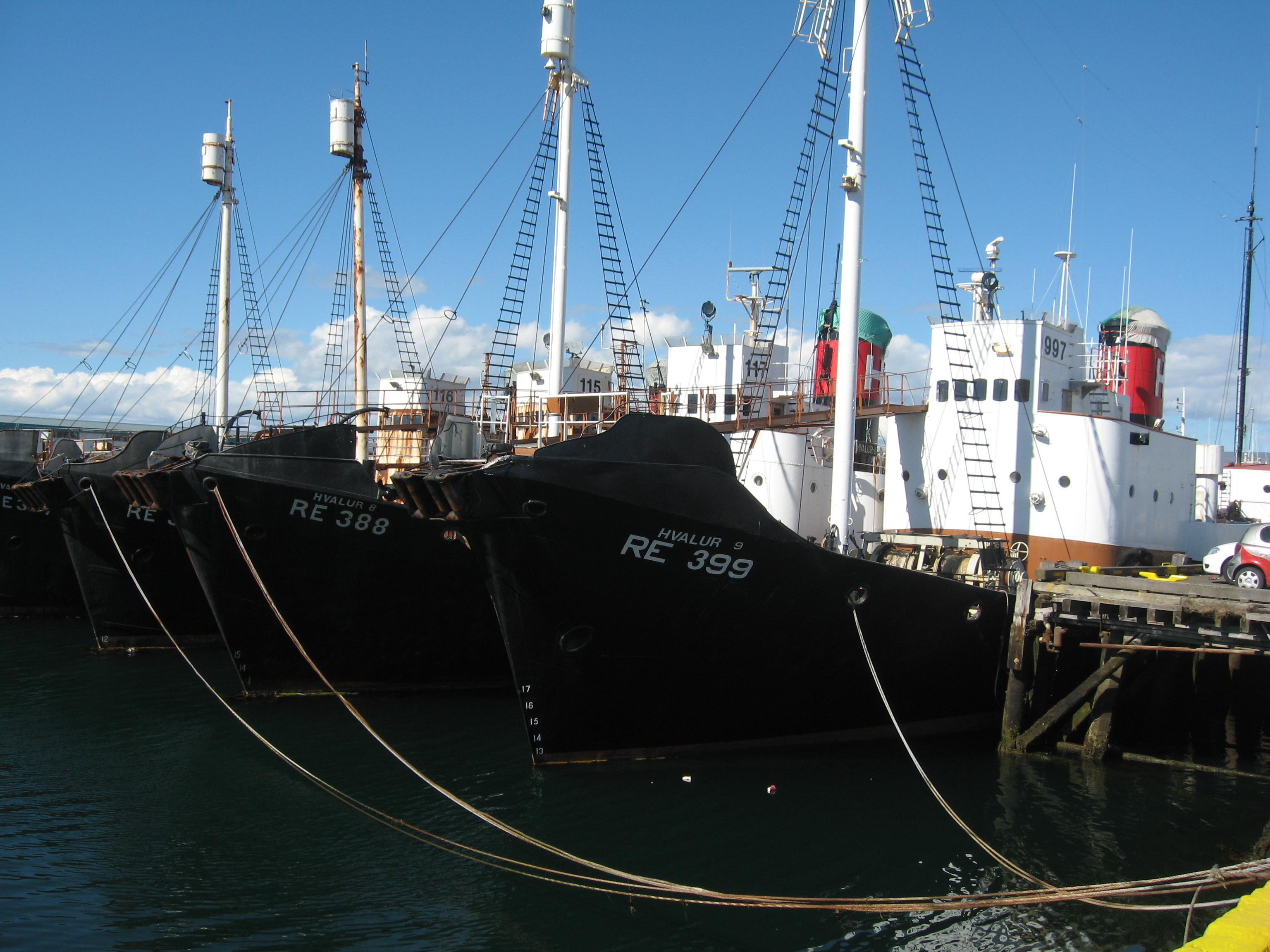
- Hvalur 9 at pier in Reykjavík along with other members of the Hvalur hf. fleet.

History

Iceland
- Name: Hvalur 9
- Owner: Hvalur hf.
- Port of registry: Iceland
- Builder: Langesund Mekaniske Verksted, Langesund, Norway
- Launched: 1952
- Acquired: 1966
- Home port: Reykjavík
- Identification: IMO number: 5361148; MMSI number: 251365110; Callsign: TFLY
- Status: in active service
- Notes: Operated by the Coast Guard as ICGV Týr during the 1973 Cod War

History

Iceland
- Name: ICGV Týr
- Operator: Icelandic Coast Guard
- Commissioned: 1972
- Decommissioned: 1973
- Identification: RE-399, fisheries registration
- Fate: Returned in 1973
- Notes: Leased during the second Cod War

General characteristics
- Type: Whaler
- Tonnage: 573.4 GRT
- Length: 51.15 m (167 ft 10 in) o/a
- Beam: 9.06 m (29 ft 9 in)
- Draft: 5.65 m (18 ft 6 in)
- Propulsion: 1398 kW steam engine
- Speed: 17 kt

Hvalur 9 is an Icelandic whaling ship built in 1952 in Norway. It has been a part of the Icelandic whaling fleet operated and owned by the company Hvalur hf. since 1966.

In 1972 and again in 1973 she was requisitioned by the Icelandic Coast Guard, repainted, renamed Týr, after the god from the Norse mythology, and armed with a 57 mm gun and subsequently used to cut the fishing gear from foreign fishing vessels fishing illegally (according to Icelandic law) in a newly claimed fishery zone during the Second Cod War. During her service in the Coast Guard she was nicknamed Hval-Týr (English: Whale-Týr) by the Icelanders and Moby Dick by the British.

Between 1987 and 2006, while commercial whaling ceased in Iceland, the ship remained unused at pier but the recommencement of whaling in Iceland brought it back into action. As of 2022, the ship remains active.
