= Abbie Lathrop =

American rodent breeder (1868–1918)

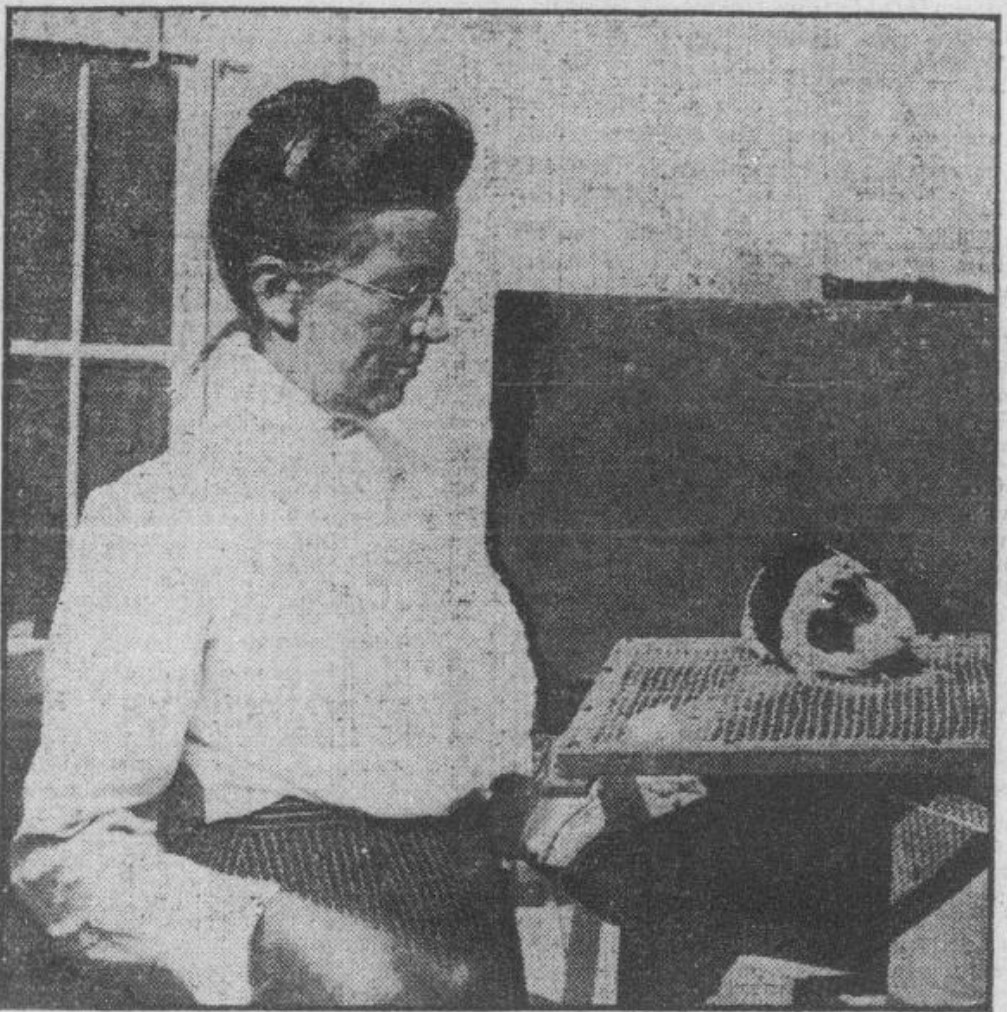
Lathrop photographed for an article in The Springfield Weekly Republican

Abbie E. C. Lathrop (1868 – 1918) was a rodent fancier and commercial breeder who bred fancy mice and inbred strains for animal models, particularly for research on development and hereditary properties of cancer.

== Biography ==
Lathrop was born in 1868 in Illinois to schoolteachers. She was homeschooled until she was 16 and earned an Illinois teaching certificate after about two years at an academy. She taught elementary school before moving to a Granby, Massachusetts farm in 1900. After her poultry business failed, she started breeding rats and mice for hobbyists and pet owners. She also raised ferrets, rabbits, and guinea pigs. She was assisted by her friends Edith Chapin and Ada Gray. Lathrop started out with a pair of waltzing mice she obtained in Granby and her farm grew to hold over 11,000 mice at one point. Her breeding records later proved useful for researchers. Lathrop began selling rodents to scientific researchers, including Harvard University's Bussey Institute. The United States government purchased her guinea pigs to test for toxic gas in the trenches of World War I.

For the Granby Mouse Farm Lathrop sourced wild mice from Michigan and Vermont. She bred Japanese waltzing mice as well as fancy mice. The mice had straw bedding and lived in wooden boxes. They were fed a diet of oats and crackers. Lathrop reported going through one and a half tons of oats and over 12 barrels of crackers each month. She occasionally paid local children 7 cents an hour to clean the cages.

As early as 1908 Lathrop found that unusual skin lesions were developing in some of her mice. She sent samples to scientists and corresponded with experimental pathologist Leo Loeb, who identified the lesions as malignant. Lathrop began developing inbred strains around 1910. Loeb and Lathrop performed experiments at her farm and the pair authored 10 journal articles from 1913 to 1919, including those published in the Journal of Cancer Research and the Journal of Experimental Medicine. They established that ovariectomies reduced the incidence of mammary tumors and that tumor susceptibility varied in different strains of mice.

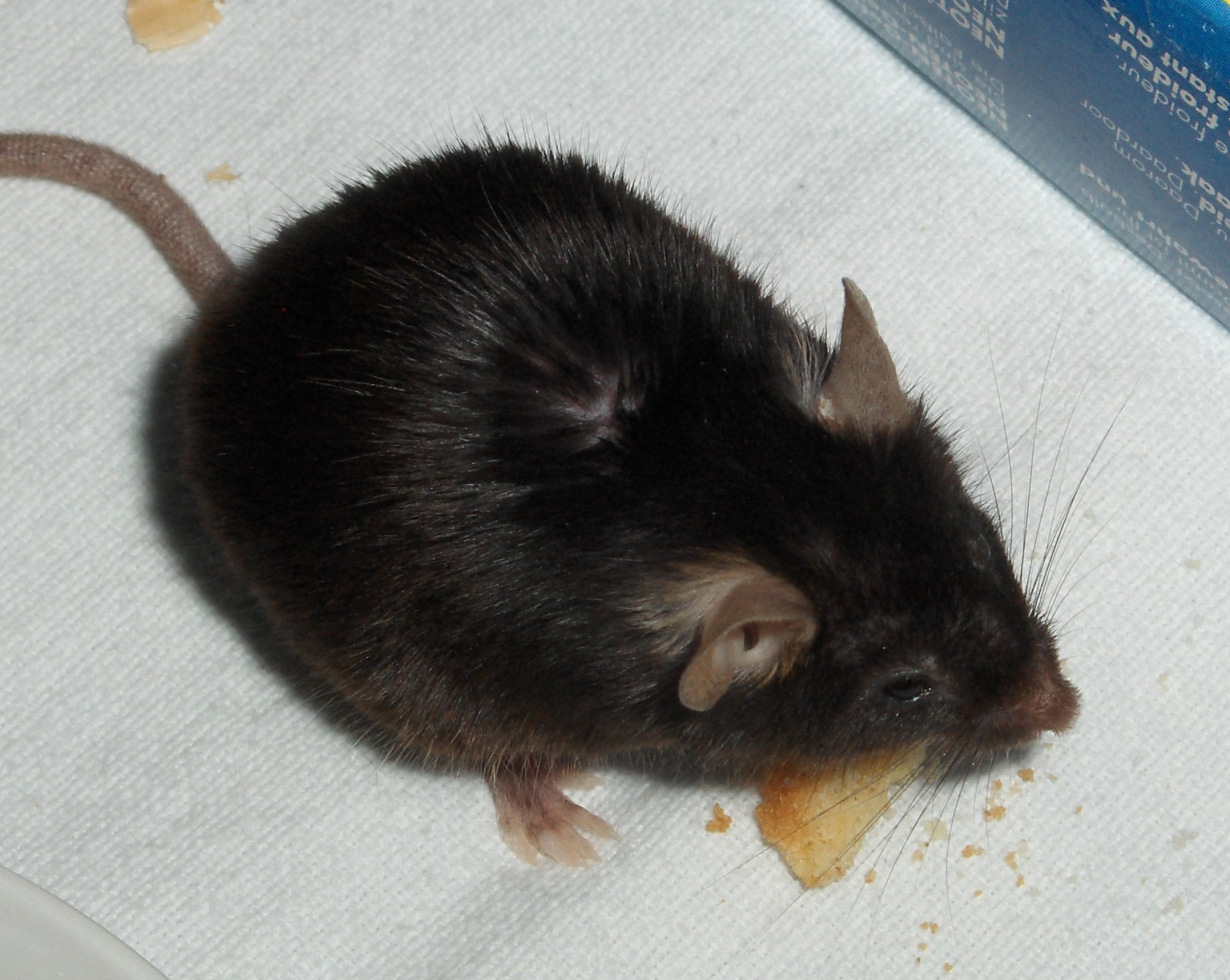
A "Black 6" mouse

Mammalian geneticist William E. Castle purchased some of Lathrop's mice in 1902. He trained C. C. Little who bred C57BL/6J ("Black 6") from Lathrop's mouse number 57. Black 6 became the most frequently used strain of laboratory mouse. While Little patronizingly called Lathrop a "talented pet-shop owner," his own DBA strain was probably derived from her partially inbred silver fawn mice. Karin Knorr Cetina wrote in 2009 that at least five of the primary strains of laboratory mice in use may derive from a single female from Lathrop.

Lathrop died of pernicious anemia in 1918. She was interred at West Cemetery in Granby, near her friends Chapin and Gray. Her notebooks, observations, and breeding records are kept in the library of The Jackson Laboratory.
