= Laboratory mouse =

Mouse used for scientific research

The albino laboratory mouse is an iconic model organism for scientific research in a variety of fields

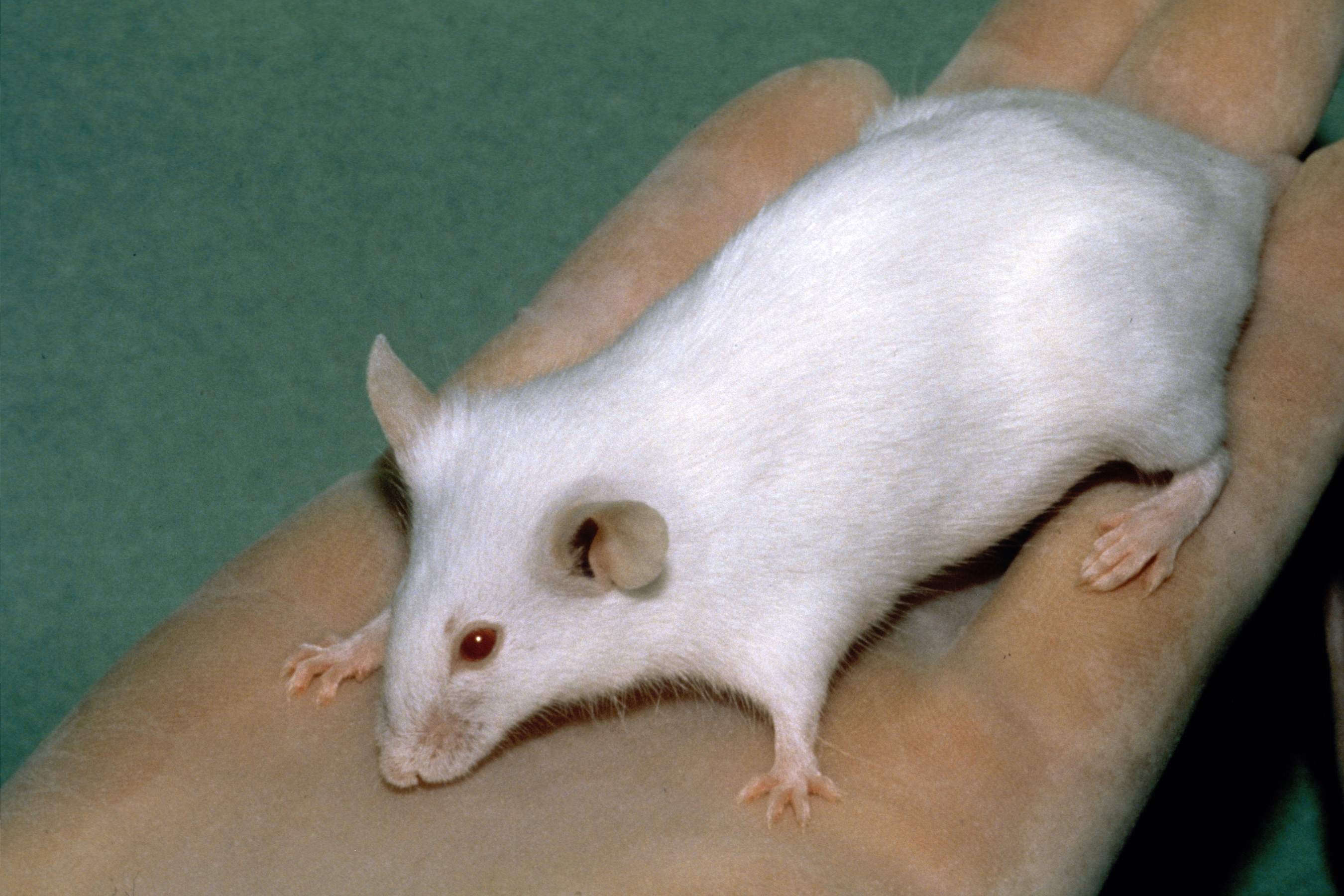
A SCID mouse

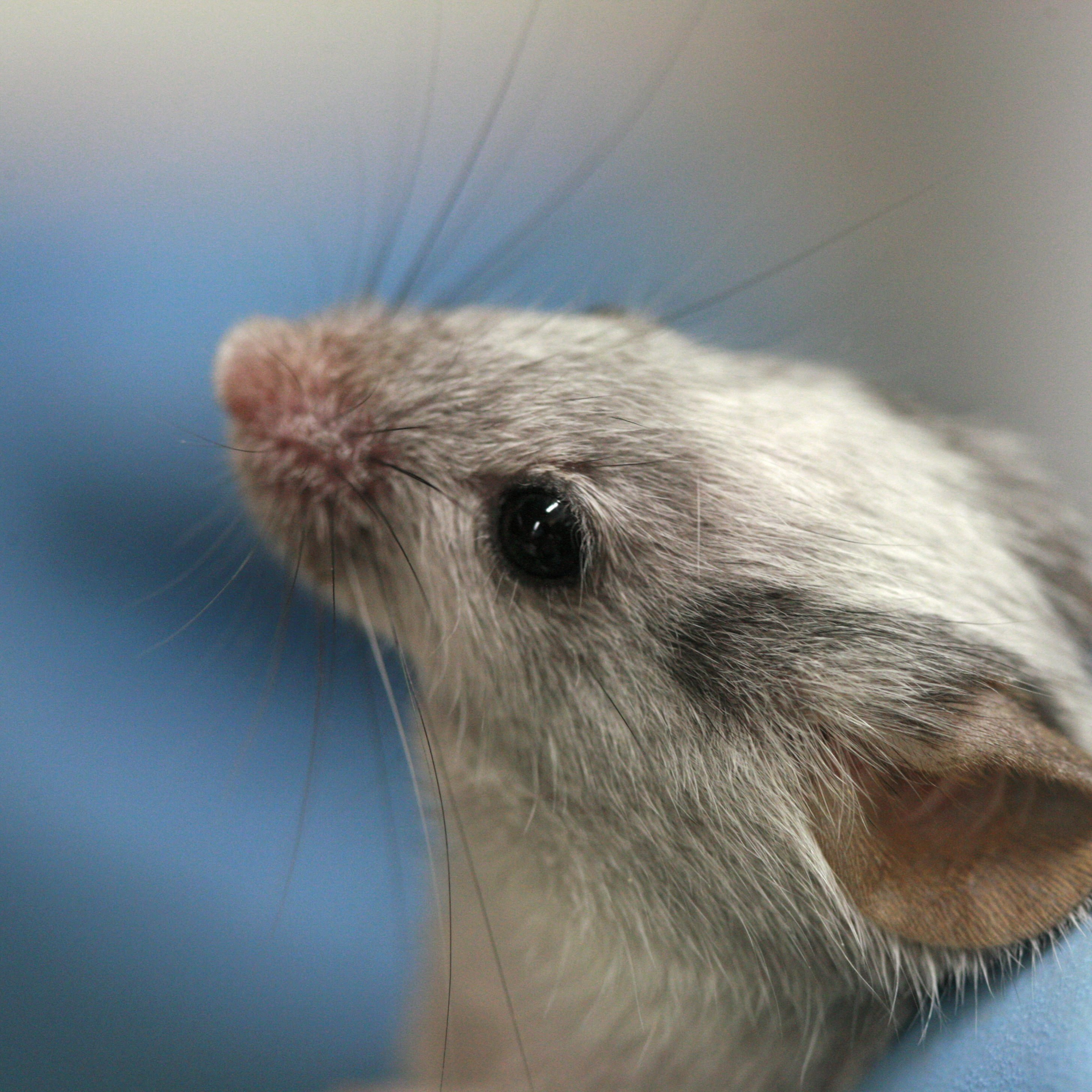
Intermediate coat colour

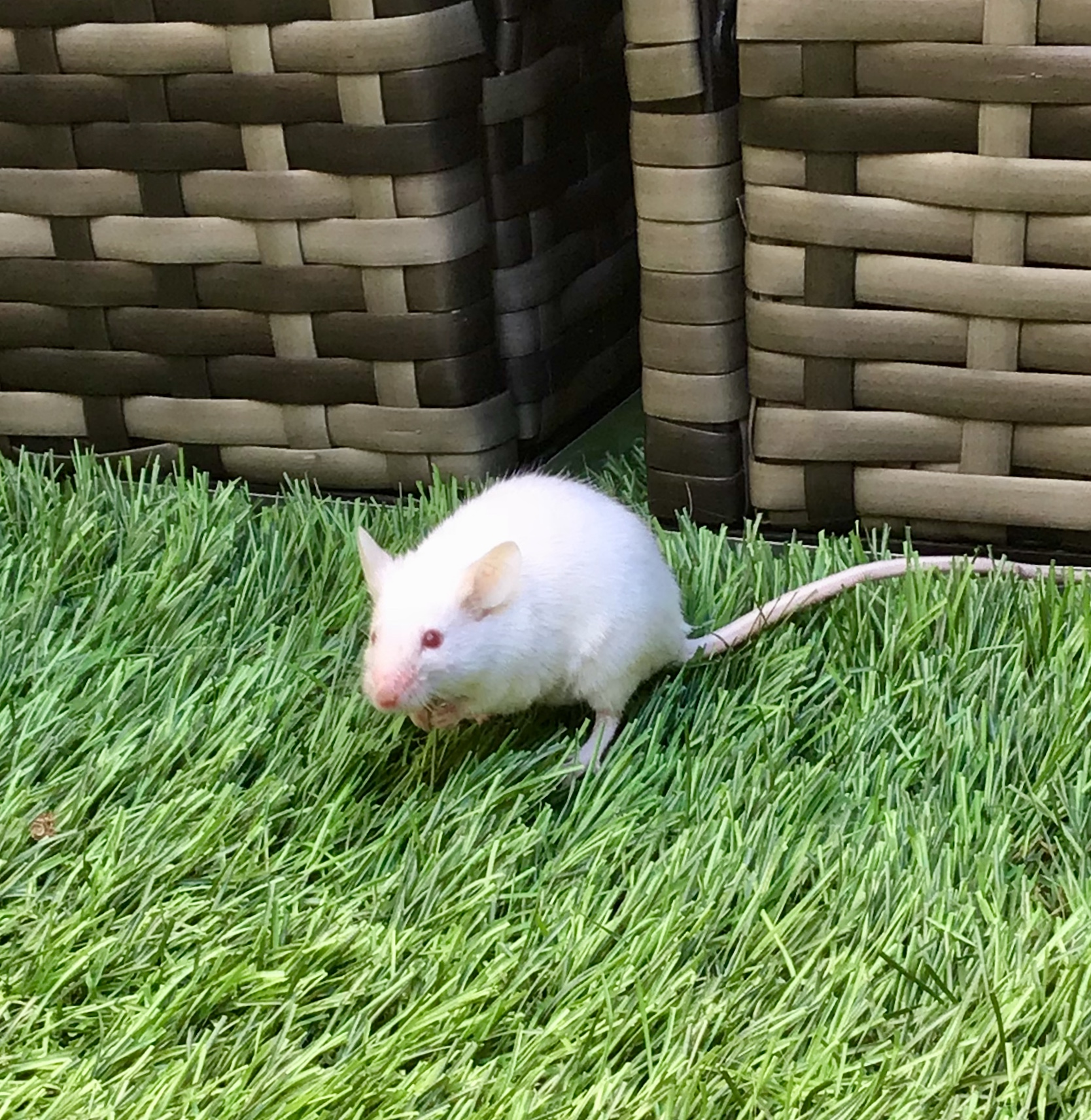
Kept as a pet

The laboratory mouse or lab mouse is a small mammal of the order Rodentia which is bred and used for scientific research or feeders for certain pets. Laboratory animal sources for these mice are usually of the species Mus musculus. They are the most commonly used mammalian research model and are used for research in genetics, physiology, psychology, medicine and other scientific disciplines. Mice belong to the Euarchontoglires clade, which includes humans. This close relationship, the associated high homology with humans, their ease of maintenance and handling, and their high reproduction rate make mice particularly suitable models for human-oriented research. The laboratory mouse genome has been sequenced, and many mouse genes have human homologues. Lab mice are sold at pet stores for snake food and can also be kept as pets.

Other mouse species sometimes used in laboratory research include two American species, the white-footed mouse (Peromyscus leucopus) and the eastern deer mouse (Peromyscus maniculatus).

== History as a biological model ==
Mice have been used in biomedical research since the 17th century, when William Harvey used them for his studies on reproduction and blood circulation and Robert Hooke used them to investigate the biological consequences of an increase in air pressure. During the 18th century, Joseph Priestley and Antoine Lavoisier both used mice to study respiration. In the 19th century, Gregor Mendel carried out his early investigations of inheritance on mouse coat color but was asked by his superior to stop breeding in his cell "smelly creatures that, in addition, copulated and had sex". He then switched his investigations to peas, but, as his observations were published in a somewhat obscure botanical journal, they were virtually ignored for over 35 years until they were rediscovered in the early 20th century. In 1902, Lucien Cuénot published the results of his experiments using mice which showed that Mendel's laws of inheritance were also valid for animals — results that were soon confirmed and extended to other species.

In the early part of the 20th century, Harvard undergraduate Clarence Cook Little was conducting studies on mouse genetics in the laboratory of William Ernest Castle. Little and Castle collaborated closely with Abbie Lathrop, a breeder of fancy mice and rats which she marketed to rodent hobbyists and keepers of exotic pets, and later began selling in large numbers to scientific researchers. Together, they generated the DBA (Dilute, Brown and non-Agouti) inbred mouse strain and initiated the systematic generation of inbred strains. The mouse has since been used extensively as a model organism and is associated with many important biological discoveries of the 20th and 21st centuries.

The Jackson Laboratory in Bar Harbor, Maine is currently one of the world's largest suppliers of laboratory mice, supplying around 3 million mice a year. The laboratory is also the world's source for more than 8,000 strains of genetically defined mice and is home of the Mouse Genome Informatics database.

== Reproduction ==
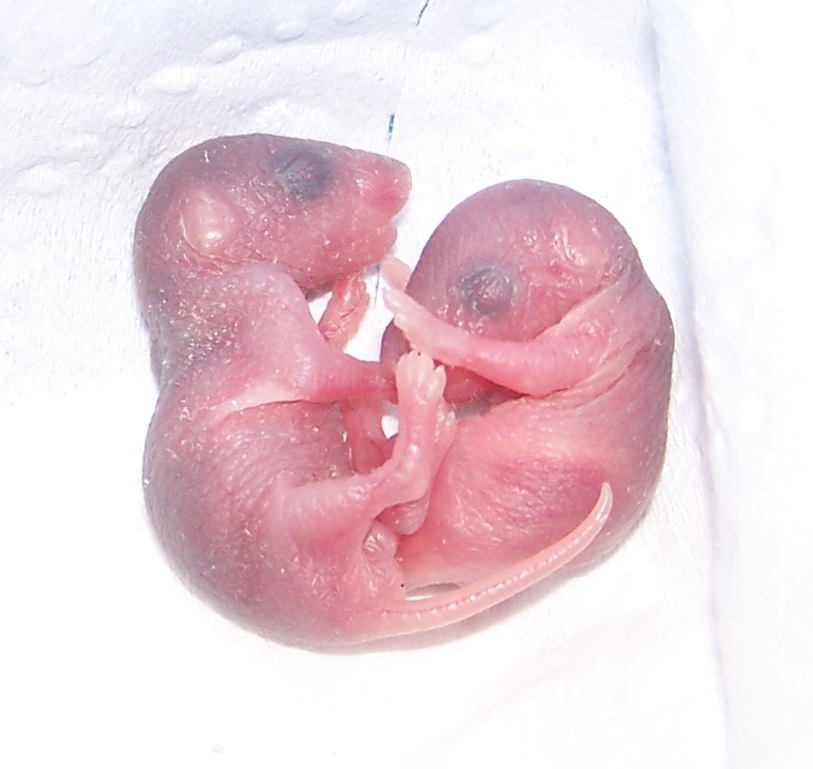
1-day-old pups

Breeding onset occurs at about 50 days of age in both females and males, although females may have their first estrus at 25–40 days. Mice are polyestrous and breed year round; ovulation is spontaneous. The duration of the estrous cycle is 4–5 days and lasts about 12 hours, occurring in the evening. Vaginal smears are useful in timed matings to determine the stage of the estrous cycle. Mating can be confirmed by the presence of a copulatory plug in the vagina up to 24 hours post-copulation. The presence of sperm on a vaginal smear is also a reliable indicator of mating.

The average gestation period is 20 days. A fertile postpartum estrus occurs 14–24 hours following parturition, and simultaneous lactation and gestation prolongs gestation by 3–10 days, owing to delayed implantation. The average litter size is 10–12 during optimum production, but this is highly strain-dependent. In general, inbred mice tend to have longer gestation periods and smaller litters than outbred and hybrid mice. The young are called pups and weigh 0.5–1.5 g (0.018–0.053 oz) at birth, are hairless, and have closed eyelids and ears. Pups are weaned at 3 weeks of age, when they weigh about 10–12 g (0.35–0.42 oz). If the female does not mate during the postpartum estrus, she resumes cycling 2–5 days post-weaning.

Newborn males are distinguished from newborn females by their greater anogenital distance and larger genital papilla. This is usually observed by lifting the tails of littermates and comparing perinea.

== Genetics and strains ==
Mice are mammals of the clade (a group consisting of an ancestor and all its descendants) Euarchontoglires, which means they are amongst the closest non-primate relatives of humans along with lagomorphs, treeshrews, and flying lemurs.

- Euarchontoglires
  - Glires
    - Rodentia (rodents)
    - Lagomorpha (rabbits, hares, pikas)
  - Euarchonta
    - Scandentia (treeshrews)
    - Primatomorpha
      - Dermoptera (flying lemurs)
      - - Primates (†Plesiadapiformes, Strepsirrhini, Haplorrhini)

Laboratory mice are the same species as the house mouse; however, they are often very different in behaviour and physiology. There are hundreds of established inbred, outbred, and transgenic strains. A strain, in reference to rodents, is a group in which all members are as nearly as possible genetically identical. In laboratory mice, this is accomplished through inbreeding. By having this type of population, it is possible to conduct experiments on the roles of genes, or conduct experiments that exclude genetic variation as a factor. In contrast, outbred populations are used when identical genotypes are unnecessary or a population with genetic variation is required, and are usually referred to as stocks rather than strains. Over 400 standardized, inbred strains have been developed.

Most laboratory mice are hybrids of different subspecies, most commonly of Mus musculus domesticus and Mus musculus musculus. Laboratory mice can have a variety of coat colours, including agouti, black and albino. Many (but not all) laboratory strains are inbred. The different strains are identified with specific letter-digit combinations; for example C57BL/6 and BALB/c. The first such inbred strains were produced in 1909 by Clarence Cook Little, who was influential in promoting the mouse as a laboratory organism. In 2011, an estimated 83% of laboratory rodents supplied in the U.S. were C57BL/6 laboratory mice.

=== Genome ===
Sequencing of the laboratory mouse genome was completed in late 2002 using the C57BL/6 strain. This was only the second mammalian genome to be sequenced after humans. The haploid genome is about three billion base pairs long (3,000 Mb distributed over 19 autosomal chromosomes plus 1 respectively 2 sex chromosomes), therefore equal to the size of the human genome. Estimating the number of genes contained in the mouse genome is difficult, in part because the definition of a gene is still being debated and extended. The current count of primary coding genes in the laboratory mouse is 23,139. compared to an estimated 20,774 in humans.

=== Mutant and transgenic strains ===
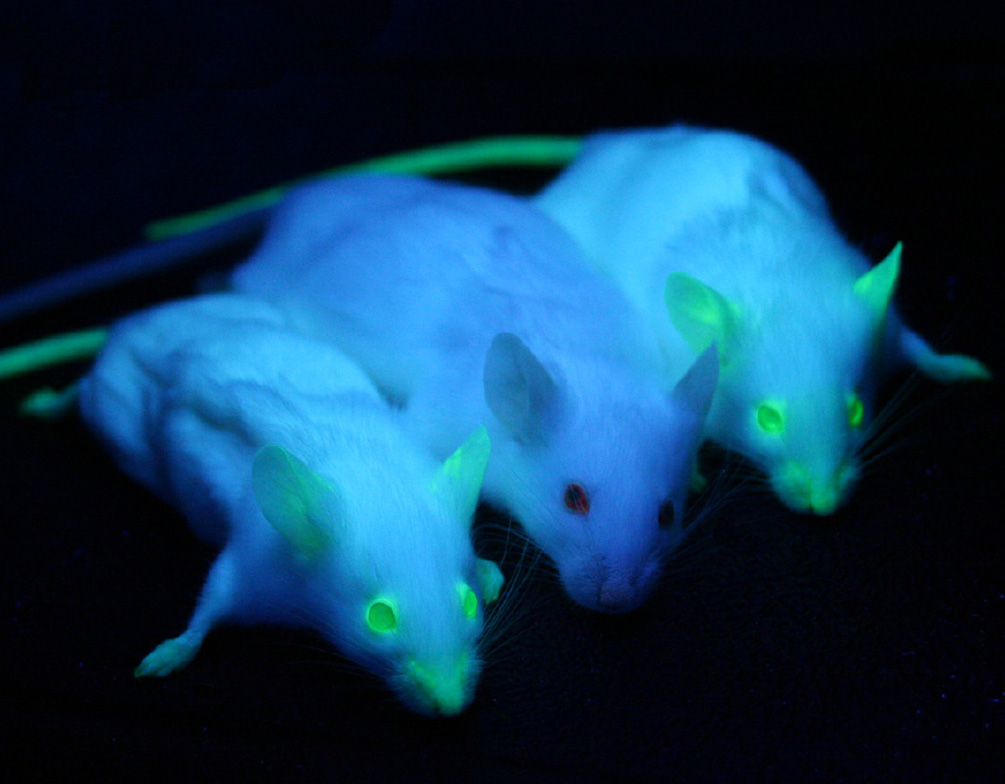
Two mice expressing enhanced green fluorescent protein under UV-illumination flanking one plain mouse from the non-transgenic parental line

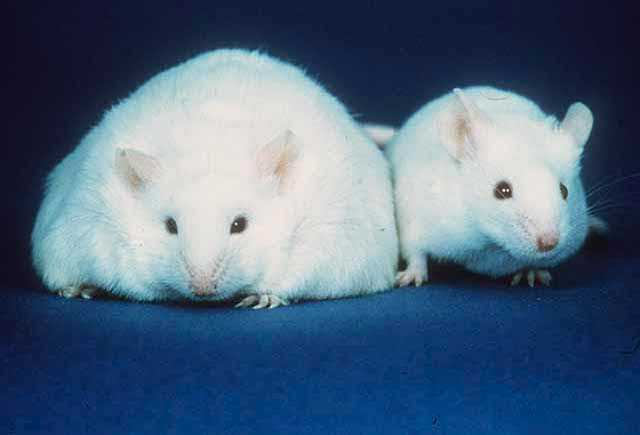
Comparison of a knockout obese mouse (left) and a normal laboratory mouse (right)

Various mutant strains of mice have been created by a number of methods. A small selection from the many available strains includes -

- Mice resulting from ordinary breeding and inbreeding:
  - Non-obese diabetic (NOD) mice, which develop diabetes mellitus type 1.
  - Murphy Roths large (MRL) mice, with unusual regenerative capacities
  - Japanese waltzing mice, which walk in a circular pattern due to a mutation adversely affecting their inner ears
  - Immunodeficient nude mice, lacking hair and a thymus: these mice do not produce T lymphocytes; therefore, they do not mount cellular immune responses. They are used for research in immunology and transplantation.
  - Severe combined immunodeficiency (SCID) mice, with an almost completely defective immune system
  - FVB mice, whose large litter sizes and large oocyte pronuclei expedite use in genetic research
  - Toxic milk mice, which fail to recruit nutrient copper into milk causing pup death. It is caused by an autosomal recessive mutation tx which arose in an inbred. Theophilos et al. 1996 found this to be genetic and localized to chromosome 8, near the centromere.
- Transgenic mice, with foreign genes inserted into their genome:
  - Abnormally large mice, with an inserted rat growth hormone gene
  - Oncomice, with an activated oncogene, so as to significantly increase the incidence of cancer
  - Doogie mice, with enhanced NMDA receptor function, resulting in improved memory and learning
- Knockout mice, where a specific gene was made inoperable by a technique known as gene knockout: the purpose is to study the function of the gene's product or to simulate a human disease
  - Obese mice, prone to obesity due to a carboxypeptidase E deficiency
  - Strong muscular mice, with a disabled myostatin gene, nicknamed "mighty mice".

Since 1998, it has been possible to clone mice from cells derived from adult animals.

=== Commonly used inbred strains ===
There are many strains of mice used in research, however, inbred strains are usually the animals of choice for most fields. Inbred mice are defined as being the product of at least 20 generations of brother X sister mating, with all individuals being derived from a single breeding pair.

Inbred mice have several traits that make them ideal for research purposes. They are isogenic, meaning that all animals are nearly genetically identical. Approximately 98.7% of the genetic loci in the genome are homozygous, so there are probably no "hidden" recessive traits that could cause problems. They also have very unified phenotypes due to this stability.

Many inbred strains have well documented traits that make them ideal for specific types of research. The following table shows the top 10 most popular strains according to Jackson Laboratories.

Common inbred strains of laboratory mice available from Jackson Laboratories
Strain	Coat color	Common research uses	Total Pubmed publications referencing the strain as of April 19, 2023
C3HeB/FeJ	Agouti	Immunology, inflammation, autoimmunity	482
NOD/ShiLtJ	Albino	Autoimmune type 1 diabetes	105
DBA/1J	Dilute brown	Rheumatoid arthritis	445
BALB/cByJ	Albino	Cancer, cardiovascular, immunology	628
DBA/2J	Dilute brown	Cardiovascular, dermatology, developmental biology	2,722
C3H/HeJ	Agouti	Cancer, cardiovascular, hematology	4,037
C57BL/6J	Black	General purpose, background	25,723
SJL/J	Albino	Cancer, cardiovascular, dermatology	1,448
FVB/NJ	Albino	Immunology, inflammation, autoimmunity	350
129S1/SvImJ	Agouti	Targeted mutations, cancer	222

==== Jackson Labs DO project ====
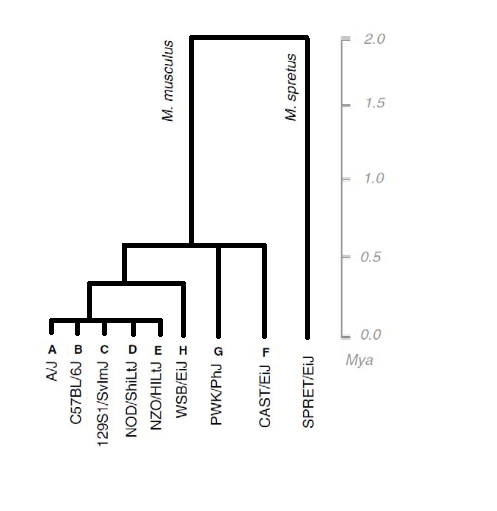
Phylogenetic tree of the eight founder strains used in the DO project, as well as their approximate age of divergence. M. spretus is included as an outgroup that diverged ~2 million years ago (mya), it is not part of the DO project.

The Jackson Labs DO (Diversity Outbred) project is a mouse breeding program using multiple inbred founder strains to create a genetically diverse population of mice for use in scientific research.

These mice are designed for fine genetic mapping, and capture a large portion of the genetic diversity of the mouse genome.

This project has resulted in over 1,000 genetically diverse mice which have been used to identify genetic factors for diseases such as obesity, cancer, diabetes, and alcohol use disorder.

Founder strains used in the DO project
Strain	Derivation	Subspecies origin	Coat color	Common research uses	Total Pubmed publications referencing the strain as of April 19, 2023
A/J	Laboratory	Mus musculus domesticus	Albino	Cancer, immunology	5,500
C57BL/6J	Laboratory	Mus musculus domesticus	Black	General purpose, background	25,723
129S1/SvImJ	Laboratory	Mus musculus domesticus	Agouti	Targeted mutations, cancer	222
NOD/ShiLtJ	Laboratory	Mus musculus domesticus	Albino	Autoimmune type 1 diabetes	105
NZO/HILtJ	Laboratory	Mus musculus domesticus	Agouti	Obesity	11
CAST/EiJ	Wild-derived	Mus musculus castaneus	Agouti	Crossbreeding heterozygous F1 hybrids, genetic mapping	154
PWK/PhJ	Wild-derived	Mus musculus musculus	Agouti	Genetic mapping	52
WSB/EiJ	Wild-derived	Mus musculus domesticus	Agouti with head blaze, greyish coat	Genetic mapping, evolution	65

== Appearance and behaviour ==
Laboratory mice have retained many of the physical and behavioural characteristics of house mice; however, due to many generations of artificial selection, some of these characteristics now vary markedly. Due to the large number of strains of laboratory mice, it is impractical to comprehensively describe the appearance and behaviour of all of them; however, they are described below for two of the most commonly used strains.

=== C57BL/6 ===
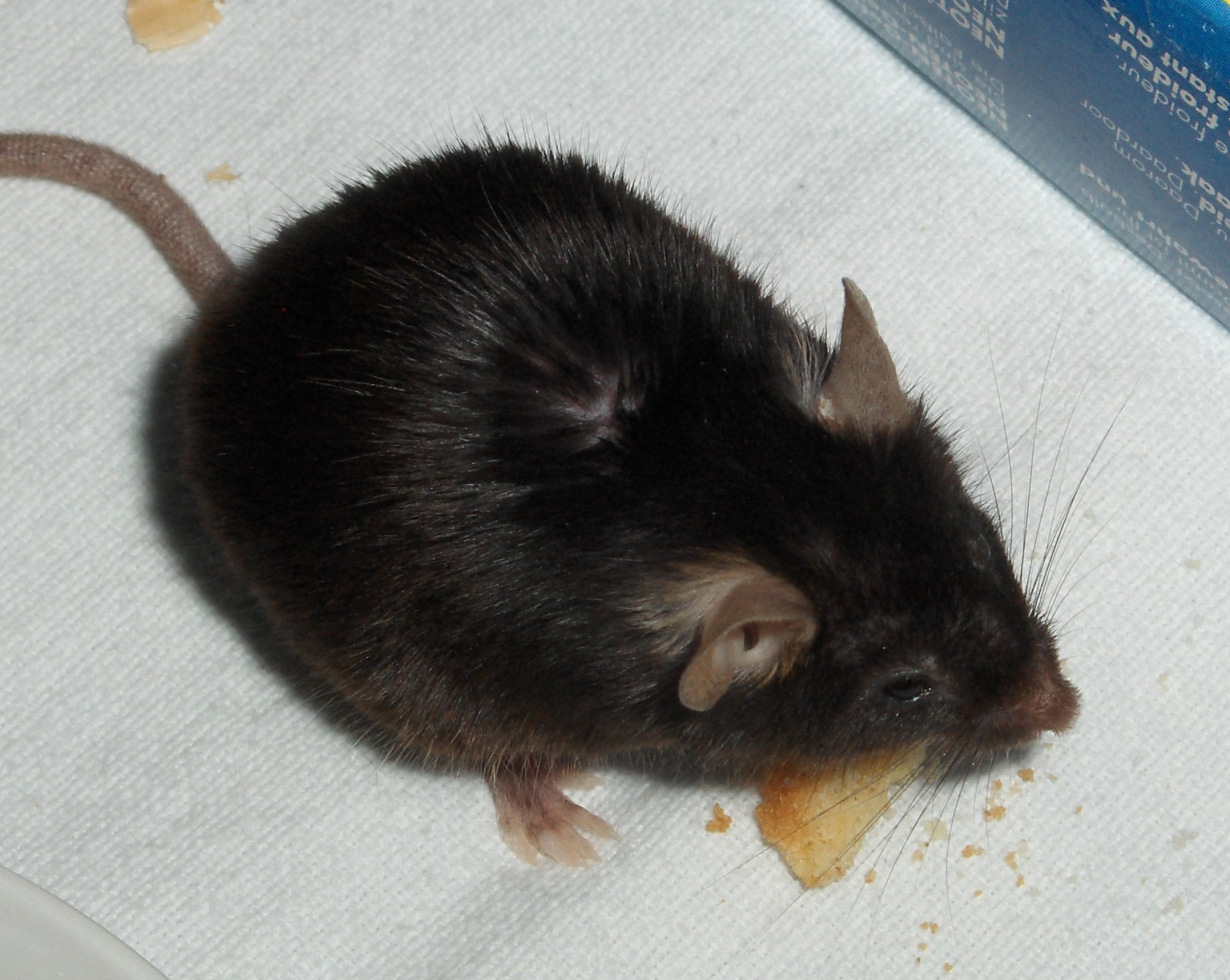
A female C57BL/6 laboratory mouse

C57BL/6 mice have a dark brown, nearly black coat. They are more sensitive to noise and odours and are more likely to bite than the more docile laboratory strains such as BALB/c.

Group-housed C57BL/6 mice (and other strains) display barbering behaviour, which used to be seen as a sign of dominance. However, it is now known that this is more of a stereotypical behaviour triggered by stress, comparable to trichotillomania in humans or feather plucking in parrots. Mice that have been barbered extensively can have large bald patches on their bodies, commonly around the head, snout, and shoulders, although barbering may appear anywhere on the body. Also self-barbering can occur. Both hair and vibrissae may be removed. Barbering is more frequently seen in female mice; male mice are more likely to display dominance through fighting.

C57BL/6 has several unusual characteristics which make it useful for some research studies but inappropriate for others: It is unusually sensitive to pain and to cold, and analgesic medications are less effective in this strain. Unlike most laboratory mouse strains, the C57BL/6 drinks alcoholic beverages voluntarily. It is more susceptible than average to morphine addiction, atherosclerosis, and age-related hearing loss. When compared directly to BALB/c mice, C57BL/6 mice also express both a robust response to social rewards and empathy.

=== BALB/c ===
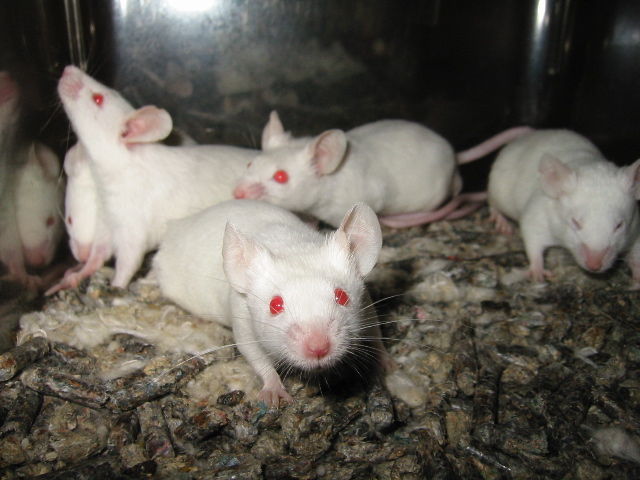
BALB/c laboratory mice

BALB/c is an albino laboratory-bred strain from which a number of common substrains are derived. With over 200 generations bred since 1920, BALB/c mice are distributed globally and are among the most widely used inbred strains used in animal experimentation.

BALB/c are noted for displaying high levels of anxiety and for being relatively resistant to diet-induced atherosclerosis, making them a useful model for cardiovascular research.

Male BALB/c mice are aggressive and will fight other males if housed together. However, the BALB/Lac substrain is much more docile. Most BALB/c mice substrains have a long reproductive life-span.

There are noted differences between different BALB/c substrains, though these are thought to be due to mutation rather than genetic contamination. The BALB/cWt is unusual in that 3% of progeny display true hermaphroditism.

=== Tg2576 ===
A useful model for Alzheimer's disease (AD) in the lab is the Tg2576 strain of mice. The K670M and N671L double mutations seen in the human 695 splice-variant of the amyloid precursor protein (APP) are expressed by this strain (also known as the Swedish mutation). A hamster prion protein gene promoter, predominantly in neurons, drives the expression. When compared to non-transgenic littermates, Tg2576 mice show a five-fold rise in Aβ40 and a 10- to 15-fold increase in Aβ42/43. These mice develop senile plaques linked to cellular inflammatory responses because their brains have approximately five times as much transgenic mutant human APP than indigenous mouse APP. The mice exhibit main characteristics of Alzheimer's disease (AD), such as increased generation of amyloid fibrils with aging, plaque formation, and impaired hippocampus learning and memory. Tg2576 mice are a good model for early-stage AD because they show amyloidogenesis and working memory impairments linked to age but do not show neuronal degeneration. The absence of cell death suggests that changes in typical cellular signaling cascades involved in learning and synaptic plasticity are probably linked to the memory phenotype.

Associative learning impairments are exacerbated when Tg2576 mice are crossed with PSEN1 transgenic animals that possess the A246E FAD mutation. This crosses promotes the build-up of amyloid and plaque development in the CNS. This lends credence to the theory that AD pathogenesis is influenced by the interplay between APP and PSEN1 gene products.

Although Tg2576 mice do not perfectly replicate late-stage AD with cell death, they do offer a platform for researching the physiology and biochemistry of the illness. With the help of transgenic mouse models, researchers can make progress in AD research by understanding the intricate relationships between gene products that are involved in the production of Aβ peptide.e physiology and biochemistry of the illness.

== Husbandry ==
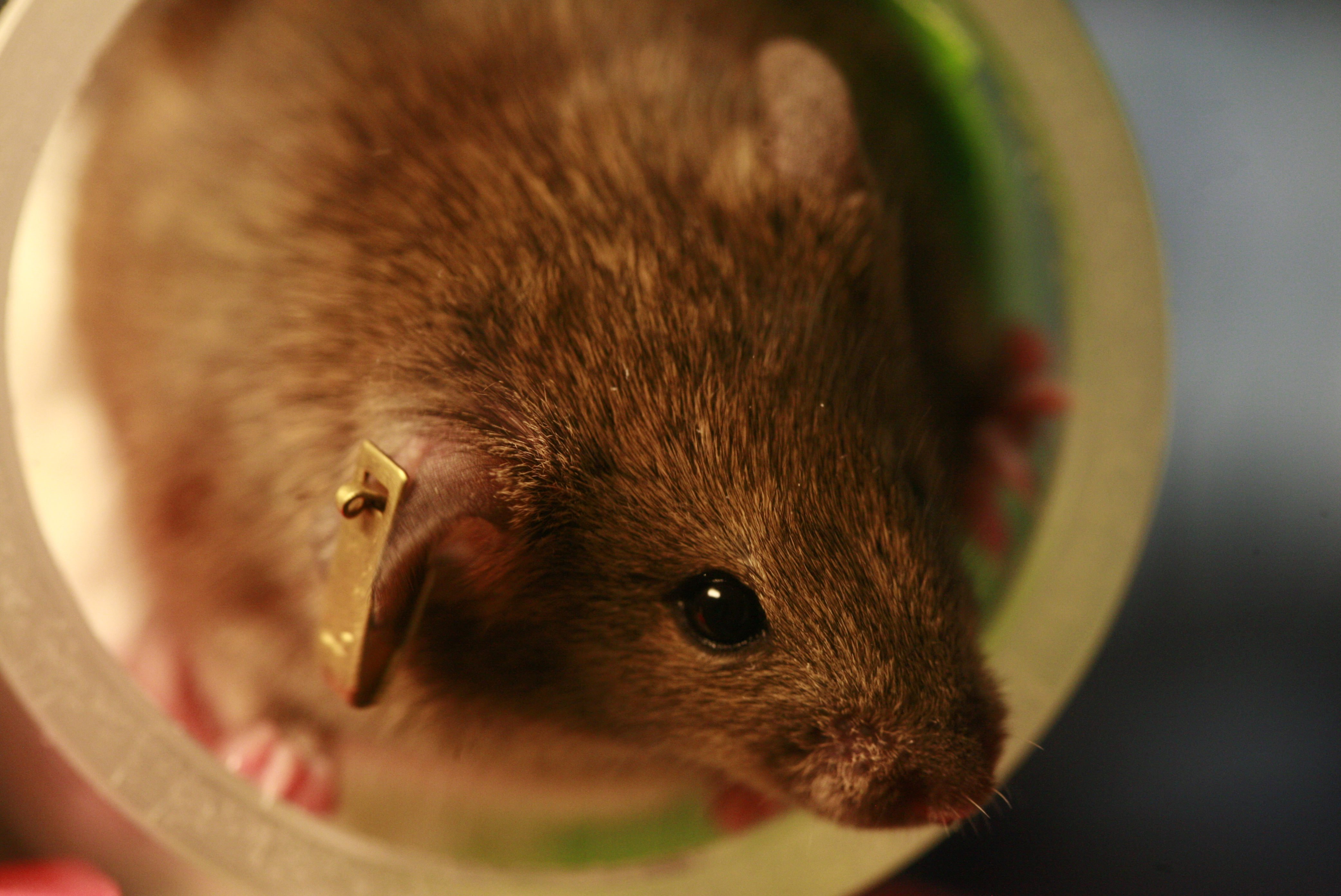
Laboratory mouse (note the ear tag)

=== Handling ===
Traditionally, laboratory mice have been picked up by the base of the tail, rather than the tip, to reduce the risk of degloving injuries. However, recent research has shown that this type of handling increases anxiety and aversive behaviour. Instead, handling mice using a tunnel or cupped hands is advocated. In behavioural tests, tail-handled mice show less willingness to explore and to investigate test stimuli, as opposed to tunnel-handled mice which readily explore and show robust responses to test stimuli.

=== Nutrition ===
In nature, mice are usually herbivores, consuming a wide range of fruit or grain. However, in laboratory studies it is usually necessary to avoid biological variation and to achieve this, laboratory mice are almost always fed only commercial pelleted mouse feed. Food intake is approximately 15 g (0.53 oz) per 100 g (3.5 oz) of body weight per day; water intake is approximately 15 ml (0.53 imp fl oz; 0.51 US fl oz) per 100 g of body weight per day.

=== Injection procedures ===
Routes of administration of injections in laboratory mice are mainly subcutaneous, intraperitoneal and intravenous. Intramuscular administration is not recommended due to small muscle mass. Intracerebral administration is also possible. Each route has a recommended injection site, approximate needle gauge and recommended maximum injected volume at a single time at one site, as given in the table below:

Route	Recommended site	Needle gauge	Maximal volume
subcutaneous	dorsum, between scapula	25-26 ga	2-3 ml
intraperitoneal	left lower quadrant	25-27 ga	2-3 ml
intravenous	lateral tail vein	27-28 ga	0.2 ml
intramuscular	hindlimb, caudal thigh	26-27 ga	0.05 ml
intracerebral	cranium	27 ga	

To facilitate intravenous injection into the tail, laboratory mice can be carefully warmed under heat lamps to vasodilate the vessels.

=== Anaesthesia ===
A common regimen for general anesthesia for the house mouse is ketamine (in the dose of 100 mg per kg body weight) plus xylazine (in the dose of 5–10 mg per kg), injected by the intraperitoneal route. It has a duration of effect of about 30 minutes.

=== Euthanasia ===
Approved procedures for euthanasia of laboratory mice include compressed CO_{2} gas, injectable barbiturate anesthetics, inhalable anesthetics, such as Halothane, and physical methods, such as cervical dislocation and decapitation. In 2013, the American Veterinary Medical Association issued new guidelines for CO_{2} induction, stating that a flow rate of 10% to 30% volume/min is optimal for euthanasing laboratory mice.

=== Pathogen susceptibility ===
A wide range of natural pathogens can infect lab mice, often without causing overt illness but still posing a risk of altered lab results. Purposeful testing and breeding has greatly reduced the incidence.

A wide range of human infectious diseases can be passed to laboratory mice, turning them into model animals for the disease for research. For diseases that do not naturally infect mice, transgenic techniques can be used to produce humanized mice expressing the requisite human genes for infection (often a cell surface receptor).

A recent study detected a murine astrovirus in laboratory mice held at more than half of the US and Japanese institutes investigated. Murine astrovirus was found in nine mice strains, including NSG, NOD-SCID, NSG-3GS, C57BL6-Timp-3^{−/−}, uPA-NOG, B6J, ICR, Bash2, and BALB/C, with various degrees of prevalence. The pathogenicity of the murine astrovirus was not known. These astroviruses were of the genus Mamastrovirus, which contains viruses that infect mammals. The course of infection in immunocompetent mice resembles that of asymptomatic astrovirus infection in immunocompetent humans, making this system a useful disease model.

== Legislation in research ==
=== United Kingdom ===
In the U.K., as with all other vertebrates and some invertebrates, any scientific procedure which is likely to cause "pain, suffering, distress or lasting harm" is regulated by the Home Office under the Animals (Scientific Procedures) Act 1986. U.K. regulations are considered amongst the most comprehensive and rigorous in the world. Detailed data on the use of laboratory mice (and other species) in research in the U.K. are published each year. In the U.K. in 2013, there were a total of 3,077,115 regulated procedures undertaken on mice in scientific procedure establishments, licensed under the Act.

=== United States ===
In the U.S., laboratory mice are not regulated under the Animal Welfare Act administered by the USDA APHIS. However, the Public Health Service Act (PHS) as administered by the National Institutes of Health does offer a standard for their care and use. Compliance with the PHS is required for a research project to receive federal funding. PHS policy is administered by the Office of Laboratory Animal Welfare. Many academic research institutes seek accreditation voluntarily, often through the Association for Assessment and Accreditation of Laboratory Animal Care, which maintains the standards of care found within The Guide for the Care and Use of Laboratory Animals and the PHS policy. This accreditation is, however, not a prerequisite for federal funding, unlike the actual compliance.

== Limitations ==
While mice are by far the most widely used animals in biomedical research, recent studies have highlighted their limitations. For example, the utility of rodents in testing for sepsis, burns, inflammation, stroke, ALS, Alzheimer's disease, diabetes, cancer, multiple sclerosis, Parkinson's disease, and other illnesses has been called into question by a number of researchers. Regarding experiments on mice, some researchers have complained that "years and billions of dollars have been wasted following false leads" as a result of a preoccupation with the use of these animals in studies.

Mice differ from humans in several immune properties: mice are more resistant to some toxins than humans; have a lower total neutrophil fraction in the blood, a lower neutrophil enzymatic capacity, lower activity of the complement system, and a different set of pentraxins involved in the inflammatory process; and lack genes for important components of the immune system, such as IL-8, IL-37, TLR10, ICAM-3, etc. Laboratory mice reared in specific-pathogen-free (SPF) conditions usually have a rather immature immune system with a deficit of memory T cells. These mice may have limited diversity of the microbiota, which directly affects the immune system and the development of pathological conditions. Moreover, persistent virus infections (for example, herpesviruses) are activated in humans, but not in SPF mice with septic complications and may change the resistance to bacterial coinfections. "Dirty" mice are possibly better suitable for mimicking human pathologies. In addition, inbred mouse strains are used in the overwhelming majority of studies, while the human population is heterogeneous, pointing to the importance of studies in interstrain hybrid, outbred, and nonlinear mice.

An article in The Scientist notes, "The difficulties associated with using animal models for human disease result from the metabolic, anatomic, and cellular differences between humans and other creatures, but the problems go even deeper than that" including issues with the design and execution of the tests themselves. In addition, the caging of laboratory animals may render them irrelevant models of human health because these animals lack day-to-day variations in experiences, agency, and challenges that they can overcome. The impoverished environments inside small mouse cages can have deleterious influences on biomedical results, especially with respect to studies of mental health and of systems that depend upon healthy psychological states.

For example, researchers have found that many mice in laboratories are obese from excess food and minimal exercise, which alters their physiology and drug metabolism. Many laboratory animals, including mice, are chronically stressed, which can also negatively affect research outcomes and the ability to accurately extrapolate findings to humans. Researchers have also noted that many studies involving mice are poorly designed, leading to questionable findings.

Some studies suggests that inadequate published data in animal testing may result in irreproducible research, with missing details about how experiments are done are omitted from published papers or differences in testing that may introduce bias. Examples of hidden bias include a 2014 study from McGill University which suggests that mice handled by men rather than women showed higher stress levels. Another study in 2016 suggested that gut microbiomes in mice may have an impact upon scientific research.

== Market size ==
The worldwide market for gene-altered mice is predicted to grow to $1.59 billion by 2022, growing at a rate of 7.5 percent per year.

== See also ==
- Woolly mouse
- Laboratory rat
- Animal testing
- Animal testing on rodents
- Animal model
- Animal identification
- Fee, Fi, Fo, Fum, and Phooey, five laboratory mice who orbited the Moon 75 times on Apollo 17
- Mouse models of colorectal and intestinal cancer
- Pinky and the Brain
- Testing cosmetics on animals
- Monument to the laboratory mouse
- TetTag
