= REPIN1 =

Protein-coding gene in the species Homo sapiens

Identifiers
- Aliases: REPIN1, AP4, RIP60, ZNF464, Zfp464, replication initiator 1
- External IDs: MGI: 1889817; GeneCards: REPIN1

Gene location (Human)
Chr.	Chromosome 7 (human)
Band	7q36.1	Start	150,368,189 bp
Band	7q36.1	End	150,374,044 bp

Gene location (Mouse)
Chr.	Chromosome 6 (mouse)
Band	6|6 B2.3	Start	48,570,817 bp
Band	6|6 B2.3	End	48,576,016 bp
RNA expression pattern
Bgee	Human / Mouse (ortholog); Top expressed in: right uterine tube; muscle of thigh; mucosa of transverse colon; pituitary gland; Skeletal muscle tissue of biceps brachii; gastrocnemius muscle; left adrenal cortex; right adrenal cortex; anterior pituitary; thymus / Top expressed in: ascending aorta; aortic valve; cumulus cell; lumbar subsegment of spinal cord; pituitary gland; pineal gland; supraoptic nucleus; lobe of cerebellum; cerebellar vermis; suprachiasmatic nucleus; More reference expression data
BioGPS	n/a
Gene ontology
Molecular function	DNA binding; metal ion binding; nucleic acid binding; RNA binding
Cellular component	nuclear origin of replication recognition complex; nucleus
Biological process	DNA replication
Sources:Amigo / QuickGO
Orthologs
Databases	NCBI: entry; OMA: entry
Species	Human	Mouse
Entrez	29803	58887
Ensembl	ENSG00000214022	ENSMUSG00000052751
UniProt	Q9BWE0	Q5U4E2
RefSeq (mRNA)	NM_001099695; NM_001099696; NM_013400; NM_014374; NM_001362745 NM_001362746; NM_001362747	NM_001079901; NM_001079902; NM_001079903; NM_001079904; NM_001079905 NM_175099
RefSeq (protein)	NP_001093165; NP_001093166; NP_037532; NP_001349674; NP_001349675 NP_001349676	NP_001073370; NP_001073371; NP_001073372; NP_001073373; NP_001073374 NP_780308
Location (UCSC)	Chr 7: 150.37 – 150.37 Mb	Chr 6: 48.57 – 48.58 Mb
PubMed search
- Wikidata
View/Edit Human	View/Edit Mouse

Replication initiator 1 is a protein that in humans is encoded by the REPIN1 gene. The protein helps enable RNA binding activity as a replication initiation-region protein. The make up of REPIN 1 include three zinc finger hand clusters that organize polydactyl zinc finger proteins containing 15 zinc finger DNA- binding motifs. It has also been predicted to help in regulation of transcription via RNA polymerase II with it being located in the nucleoplasm. Expression of this protein has been seen in the colon, spleen, kidney, and 23 other tissues within the human body throughout.

== History ==
REPIN 1 originally was first identified in a study focusing on replication of dihydrofolate reductase gene (dhfr) in Chinese hamsters, with it initiating near stable bent DNA that binds to multiple factors. In the paper scientists used protein DNA cross linking experiments that revealed the 60-kDa polypeptide, with it being labeled by its alternative name RIP60. Due to the cofractionating of ATP-dependent DNA helicase with DNA-binding activity that was origin specific, the study suggested that RIP60 was involved with chromosomal DNA synthesis in mammalian cells.

== Genetics ==
REPIN 1 can be found on chromosome 7q36.1 according to the National Center for Biotechnology Information within humans. REPIN 1 acts as a specific sequence binding protein in human DNA which is required for the start of chromosomal replication. Located in the nucleoplasm and part of the nuclear origin of replication recognition complex within the nucleus, it first binds on 5'-ATT'3' of the sequence. It does this on reiterated sequences downstream of the origin of bidirectional replication (OBR), and at a second 5'-ATT-3' homologous sequence opposite of the orientation within the OBR zone. It encodes proteins containing fifteen C_{2}H_{2} zinc finger DNA binding motifs to three clusters referred to as hands Z1 (ZFs 1-5), Z2 (ZFs 6-8), and Z3 (ZFs 9-15) with proline rich areas being present between them.

== Function ==
The function of REPIN 1 is to act as a replication initiator and sequence binding protein for chromosomal replication. Like other zinc finger proteins its physiological functions, molecular mechanisms, and regulations are not fully understood. However due to its high expression in adipose tissue and livers found in sub congenic and congenic rat strains some scientists have seen in as a participant in the regulation of genes. More specifically in those that are involved in lipid droplet formation and fusion, adipogenesis, as well as glucose and fatty acid transport in adipocytes. Human in vitro data also suggests REPIN 1's role in adipocyte function and a possible therapeutic target for treating obesity.
