= Recombinant inbred strain =

Organism with chromosomes from inbreeding

A recombinant inbred strain or recombinant inbred line (RIL) is an organism with chromosomes that incorporate an essentially permanent set of recombination events between chromosomes inherited from two or more inbred strains. F1 and F2 generations are produced by intercrossing the inbred strains; pairs of the F2 progeny are then mated to establish inbred strains through long-term inbreeding.

Families of recombinant inbred strains numbering from 25 to 5000 are often used to map the locations of DNA sequence differences (quantitative trait loci) that contributed to differences in phenotype in model organisms. Recombinant inbred strains or lines were first developed using inbred strains of mice but are now used to study a wide range of organisms – Saccharomyces cerevisiae (yeast), Zea mays (maize), barley, Drosophila melanogaster, C. elegans and rat.

== History ==
The origins and history of recombinant inbred strains are described by Crow. While the potential utility of recombinant inbred strains in mapping analysis of complex polygenic traits was obvious from the outset, the small number of strains only made it feasible to map quantitative traits with very large effects (quasi-Mendelian loci). One of the initial motivations to use recombinant inbred strains is that expensive genotype data can be accumulated and reused – greatly simplifying mapping studies. Another factor is the precision of mapping that can be achieved using these strains compared to typical F2 intercross progeny.

As genotyping became progressively less expensive and more accurate the main advantage of using recombinant inbred strains and other genetic reference panels shifted to the ability to assemble massive and coherent databases on phenotypes (e.g., the GeneNetwork web service), and to use these coherent open-source data sets for large-scale collaborative research projects in predictive medicine and plant and animal research.

== Use ==
Recombinant inbred strains are now widely used in systems genetics and to study gene–environment interactions. It is possible to accumulate extensive genetic and phenotype data for each member of a family of recombinant inbred strains under several different conditions (e.g., baseline environment versus stressful environment). Each strain has a single fixed genome and it is also possible to resample a given genotype multiple times in multiple environments to obtain highly accurate estimates of genetic and environmental effects and their interactions.

== Genetics ==
Chromosomes of recombinant inbred strains typically consist of alternating haplotypes of highly variable length that are inherited intact from the parental strains. In the case of a typical mouse recombinant inbred strain made by crossing maternal strain BALB/cBy (C) with paternal strain C57BL/6By (B) called a CXB recombinant inbred strain, a chromosome will typically incorporate 2 to 5 alternating haplotype blocks with underlying genotypes such as BBBBBCCCCBBBCCCCCCCC, where each letter represents a single genotype (e.g. a SNP), where series of identical genotypes represent haplotypes, and where a transition between haplotypes represents a recombination event between the parental genomes. Both chromosomes (in any given chromosome pair) will have the same alternating pattern of haplotypes, and all markers will be homozygous. Each of the different chromosomes (Chr 1, Chr 2, etc.) will have a different pattern of haplotypes and recombinations. The only exception is that the Y chromosome and the mitochondrial genome, both of which are inherited intact from the paternal and maternal strain, respectively. For an RI strain to be useful for mapping purposes, the approximate position of recombinations along each chromosome need to be well defined either in terms of centimorgan or DNA basepair position. The precision with which these recombinations are mapped is a function of the number and position of the genotypes used to type the chromosomes – 20 in the example above.

== Mapping ==
All else being equal, the larger the family of recombinant inbred strains, the greater the power and resolution with which phenotypes can be mapped to chromosomal locations. The first set of eight strains, the CXB family, were generated by Donald Bailey at the Jackson Laboratory from an intercross between a female BALB/cBy mouse (abbreviated C) and a male C57BL/6By mouse in the 1960s. The small panel of 8 CXB strains was originally used to determine if the Major Histocompatibility (MHC) locus on proximal chromosome 17 was a key factor in different immune responses such as tissue rejection. The methods used to determine the locations of recombinations relied on visible markers (coat color phenotypes such as the C and B loci) and the electrophoretic mobility of proteins. Somewhat larger families of recombinant inbred strains were generated concurrently by Benjamin Taylor to map Mendelian and other major effect loci. In the 1990s the utility of recombinant inbred strains for mapping was significantly improved thanks to higher density genotypes made possible by the use of microsatellite markers. Between 2005 and 2007, virtually all extant mouse and rat recombinant inbred strains were regenotyped at many thousands of SNP markers, providing highly accurate maps of recombinations.
