= Leroy Stevens =

American Biologist

Leroy Carlton Stevens
- Born: 1920; Kenmore, New York
- Died: March 28, 2015 (aged 94–95); Bar Harbor, Maine
- Education: Cornell University (BS, 1942); University of Rochester (Ph.D., 1952)
- Known for: Pioneer of embryonic stem cell research
- Scientific career
- Fields: genetics stem cell biology embryology
- Workplaces: Jackson Laboratory
- Doctoral advisor: Johannes Holtfreter

Leroy C. Stevens (1920–2015) was a scientist at The Jackson Laboratory acknowledged as an early pioneer of embryonic stem cell research.

== History ==
Stevens was born in Kenmore, New York in 1920. In 1942, he received his B.S. from Cornell University. After completing his undergraduate degree, Stevens served in the United States Army in Europe, where he was awarded the Silver Star for his bravery in action in Sicily by General George S. Patton. When he returned to the US, he completed his Ph.D. in embryology from the University of Rochester in 1952 studying under Johannes Holtfreter. He subsequently joined The Jackson Laboratory as a postdoctoral laboratory Fellow in 1953. In 1967, he was promoted to the position of senior staff scientist at The Jackson Lab, a position now designated as professor. Stevens spent his entire professional career at The Jackson Laboratory, except a sabbatical year from 1961 to 1962 which he spent as a Guggenheim Fellow at the Laboratoire d’Embryologie Nogent sur Marne.

Originally, Stevens' work focused on studying the harmful health impacts of cigarette paper because of tobacco company grant to C.C. Little, the founder of The Jackson Laboratory. However, in 1958 he examined a large testicular tumor on a mouse from the 129 strain and noticed it was composed of many kinds of tissues, including muscle, skin, bone, and hair. Over time, Stevens observed that these tumors, known as teratocarcinomas or teratomas, produced not only this variety of tissue types but also groups of undifferentiated cells with the capacity to grow into a wide range of tissue types. In 1970, Stevens noticed that the cell populations he was studying that gave rise to teratomas were very similar to the cells of very early embryos. Stevens called these cell types "pluripotent embryonic stem cells." In order to study this phenomenon, Stevens selectively bred strain 129 to select for the teratoma tendency. Normally, such cancers are very rare but in Stevens’ new mouse strain, they were present in 1 out of every 10 mice. Beatrice Mintz and Karl Illmensee, visited Stevens to learn his techniques and use his 129 mice bred for a high rate of teratomas and used these techniques to demonstrate that the embryonic stem cells could develop not only into teratomas but also into full organisms. This work was foundational in the field of embryonic stem cells and stem cell research.

Stevens' later studies focused on developing mouse models for the testing of chemotherapeutic drugs. and retired from the Laboratory in 1989. In 2015, at the age of 94, he died of congestive respiratory failure.
