= George Weinstock =

American geneticist

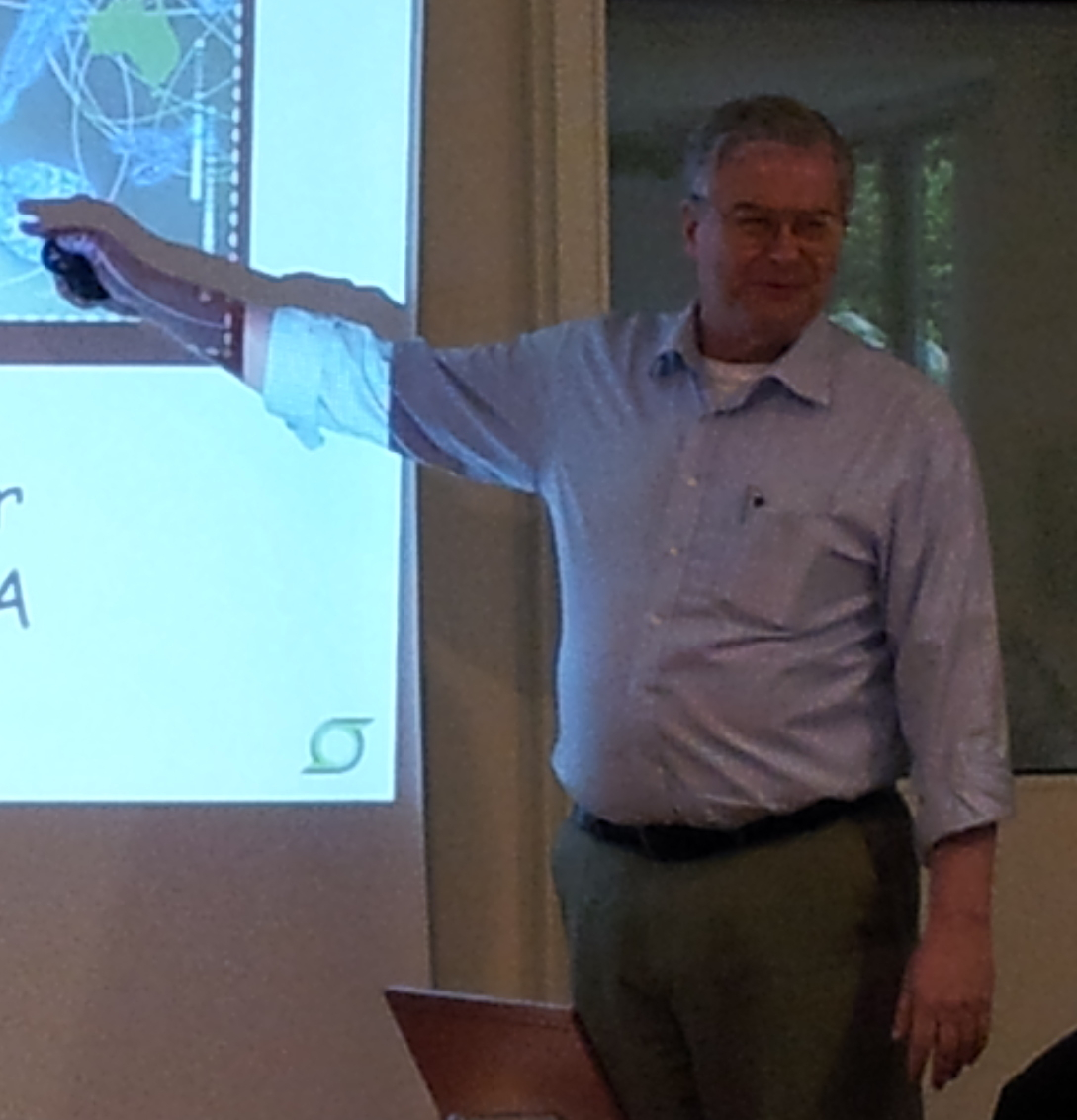
- George Weinstock
- Born: February 6, 1949
- Died: November 26, 2023 (aged 74)
- Education: University of Michigan, MIT
- Scientific career
- Workplaces: Jackson Laboratory; The Genome Institute; Washington University School of Medicine
- Doctoral advisor: David Botstein

George M. Weinstock (born February 6, 1949) was an American geneticist and microbiologist on the faculty of The Jackson Laboratory for Genomic Medicine, where he is a professor and the associate director for microbial genomics. Before joining The Jackson Laboratory, he taught at Washington University in St. Louis and served as associate director of the McDonnell Genome Institute. Previously, Weinstock was co-director of the Human Genome Sequencing Center (HGSC) at Baylor College of Medicine in Houston, Texas, and Professor of Molecular and Human Genetics. He received his B.S. degree from the University of Michigan in 1970 and his Ph.D. from the Massachusetts Institute of Technology in 1977. He has spent most of his career taking genomic approaches to study fundamental biological processes.

Weinstock's parents met during the Manhattan Project in Los Alamos, New Mexico, and he grew up meeting many of the participants in the atomic bomb project and their colleagues. He performed his PhD thesis under David Botstein at MIT, studying the structure of phage P22 chromosome.

As a postdoctoral fellow with I. R. Lehman at Stanford University School of Medicine, Weinstock and Kevin McEntee discovered that the RecA protein of E. coli catalyzed strand transfer in genetic recombination. Later, as a faculty member at the University of Texas Health Science Center at Houston, he led one of the first bacterial genome projects, collaborating with the J. Craig Venter Institute to sequence the entire genome of a bacterium, Treponema pallidum, the organism that causes syphilis. In 1999 he joined Richard Gibbs at the HGSC as one of the five main centers to work on the Human Genome Project. The HGSC produced sequences of human chromosomes 3, 12 and X. Weinstock was a principal investigator in projects producing genome sequences for rat, mouse, macaque, bovinae, sea urchin, honey bee, fruit fly and many microbial genomes, as well as one of the first personal genome projects, sequencing James Watson’s genome using next-generation sequencing technology.

He was a leader of the Human Microbiome Project, studying the collection of microbes that colonize the human body.

== Awards and honors ==
- Fellow, American Association for the Advancement of Science
- Fellow, American Academy of Microbiology
- Editorial Board, Genome Biology
- Editorial Board, Genome Biology and Evolution
- Editorial Board, BMC Genomics
