= Coisogenic strain =

Inbred strain

Coisogenic strains are one type of inbred strain that differs by a mutation at a single locus and all of the other loci are identical. There are numerous ways to create an inbred strain and each of these strains are unique. Genetically engineered mice can be considered a coisogenic strain if the only difference between the engineered mouse and a wild-type mouse is a specific locus. Coisogenic strains can be used to investigate the function of a certain genetic locus.

Coisogenic strains can be induced chemically or through radiation however, other types of alterations within the genome may also occur. Coisogenic strains may also occur through a spontaneous mutation that occurs in an inbred strain. To create a coisogenic strain through breeding, a mouse with the specific mutation on a locus is mated to an inbred strain (e.g., C57BL/6J) mouse.

The offspring of the mutated mouse with the inbred strain has a 50% chance of carrying the mutation. From this, the offspring with the mutation can be mated to a heterozygous carrier which then creates offspring with 75% of the genetic background. This backcrossing is then continued until more than 99% is genetic background and the mutated locus is inherited. However, if the specific mutation cannot be passed on, heterozygous animals should be used to breed with the original inbred strain. Full-sib mating are used to maintain coisogenic strains if the specific gene locus is homozygous. However, a regular backcrossing of these coisogenic strains with their standard parental strain is preferred in order to avoid subline divergence.
