= Muriel Davisson =

American geneticist

Muriel Davisson is an American geneticist who developed the Down syndrome mouse model Ts65Dn.

In 1959 she graduated from Pemetic High School in Southwest Harbor, Maine. She holds Ph.D. from Penn State University (1969). She was director of Genetic Resource Science at Jackson Laboratory. Her work concentrates on developing mouse models of human genetic disorders including Down syndrome. She is now semiretired from Jackson Laboratory. Her mice was used in a number of Down syndrome studies leading to promising drug therapies. In 2002 the National Down Syndrome Society named her "Researcher of the Year."

== Selected publications ==
- Davisson MT, Linder CC. 2004. Historical Functions. In: The Laboratory Mouse, The Handbook of Experimental Animals, Hedrich, HJ, Bullock G, Petrusz P, [eds], Elsevier Academic Press, San Diego, CA, pp. 15–24.
- Davisson MT. 2006. Genetic Mapping. In: Mouse in Biomedical Research, 2nd edition, Volume 1 Fox J, Barthold S, Davisson MT, Newcomer C, Quimby F, Smith A (eds.), Elsevier, Inc., San Diego, CA, Chapter 7 pp. 115–133.
- Davisson MT, Handel MA. 2006. Cytogenetics. In: Mouse in Biomedical Research, 2nd edition, Volume 1, Fox J, Barthold S. Davisson MT, Newcomer C, Quimby F, Smith A (eds.), Elsevier, Inc., San Diego, CA, Chapter 9 pp. 145–164.
- Chang B, Hawes NL, Davisson MT, Heckenlively JR. 2007. Mouse Models of RP. In: Retinal Degenerations: Biology, Diagnostics, and Therapeutics. Tombran-Tink J, Barnstable CJ (eds.), The Humana Press, Inc., Totowa, NJ, pp. 149–164.
