= Wa Xian =

Chinese-American molecular geneticist

Wa Xian is a Chinese-American molecular geneticist, stem cell biologist, and cancer researcher. She is a Professor of Cancer Biology at the Wake Forest University School of Medicine in Charlotte, North Carolina. Her research focuses on stem cell heterogeneity in epithelial tissues, regenerative medicine, and drug discovery targeting pathogenic stem cells in cancer and chronic inflammatory diseases.

== Early life and education ==
Xian was born in Tianjin, China. Xian earned a Bachelor of Science in Biochemistry from Nankai University in 1996 and received her Ph.D. in Molecular Genetics from The University of Texas MD Anderson Cancer Center in Houston in 2002.

== Career ==
Xian completed postdoctoral research in breast cancer at Baylor College of Medicine under Jeffrey Rosen from 2002 to 2007 and ovarian cancer stem cells under Christopher Crum at Brigham and Women’s Hospital, Harvard Medical School from 2007 to 2009. She also conducted research in epithelial stem cell biology with Howard Green, a pioneer in regenerative medicine.

From 2009 to 2012, Xian served as Principal Investigator at the Institute for Medical Biology, A*STAR, Singapore, where she conducted work on epithelial stem cell biology. Concurrently, she was a Visiting Scientist in the Department of Pathology at Brigham and Women’s Hospital in Boston from 2009 to 2015.

She also served as Assistant Professor in the Department of Quantitative Cell Biology at The Jackson Laboratory from 2013 to 2014 and in the Department of Genetics and Developmental Biology at the University of Connecticut from 2013 to 2015. She then joined the University of Texas Health Science Center at Houston's McGovern Medical School as Assistant Professor from 2015 to 2019 and subsequently served at the University of Houston Stem Cell Center as Research Associate Professor from 2019 to 2023 and Research Professor from 2024 to 2025.

In 2025, Xian was appointed Professor of Cancer Biology at Wake Forest University School of Medicine, where she continues her research on stem cell heterogeneity, regenerative medicine, and drug discovery targeting cancer and inflammatory diseases.

Xian co-founded TractBio in Boston, which operates a research laboratory in Charlotte, North Carolina, within the Atrium Health innovation district, The Pearl.

== Research ==
Wa Xian's research focuses on stem cells in human cancers and chronic inflammatory diseases. She pioneered methods to clone stem cells from normal tissue, precursor lesions, and malignant tumors, as well as chronic inflammatory diseases, enabling detailed study of stem cell heterogeneity, clonal evolution, and disease mechanisms, and efforts at drug discovery for these conditions.

Her work in esophageal adenocarcinoma (EAC), for instance, has shown that 1:1,000 tumor cells are clonogenic and together define the intratumor genomic heterogeneity of the patient's tumor. EAC is known to be preceded by as much as 20 years by "precursor lesions", non-malignant histological abnormities known as "Barrett's esophagus", and "low-" and "high-grade dysplasia".

Her drug discovery for chronic inflammatory diseases is focused on the development of therapeutics that target these pathogenic variant stem cells while sparing the normal stem cell. Xian is extending the paradigm she developed across chronic lung conditions to chronic inflammatory conditions affecting the gastrointestinal tract including Crohn's and ulcerative colitis , and conditions of the liver, endometrium, and kidney also marked by inflammation and fibrosis.

Xian works with the Chemistry group at TractBio to convert lead "hits" lethal to stem cells of malignancies and chronic inflammatory diseases in high-throughput screens to therapeutics for patients in need.
