= Edison Liu =

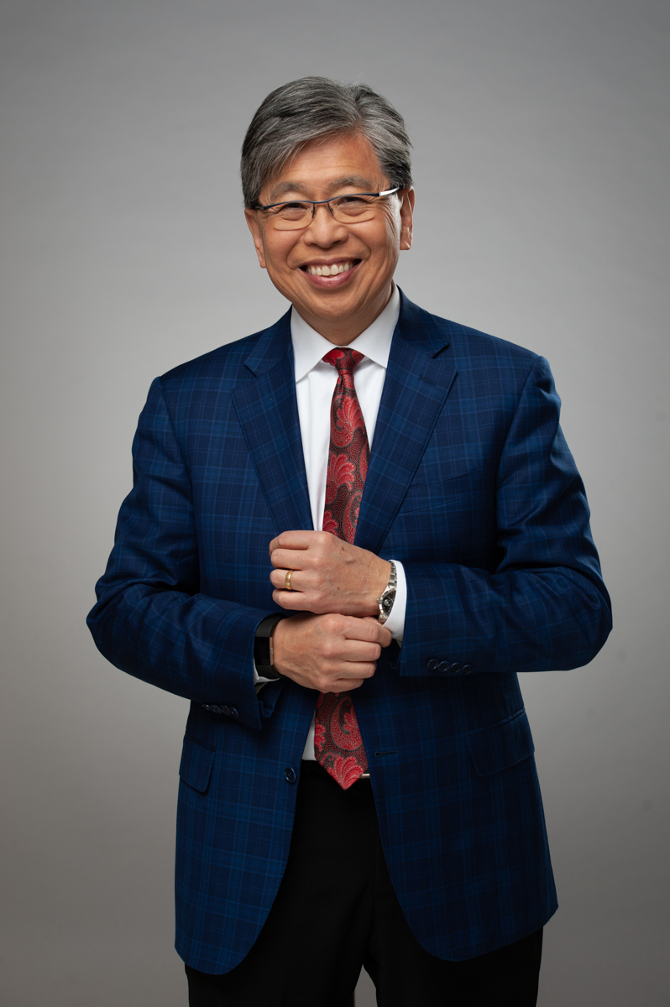

Edison Tak-Bun Liu is an American chemist and former president and CEO of The Jackson Laboratory and director of its NCI-designated Cancer Center (2012–2021). He previously served as founding executive director of the Genome Institute of Singapore (GIS), chairman of the Health Sciences Authority, and president of the Human Genome Organization (HUGO) (2007–2013).

From 1997 to 2001, he was scientific director of the National Cancer Institute's Division of Clinical Sciences. At the University of North Carolina at Chapel Hill (1987–1996), he held leadership roles at the Lineberger Comprehensive Cancer Center, UNC School of Public Health, and CALGB.

== Education ==
Edison T. Liu earned his B.S. in Chemistry and Psychology from Stanford University in 1973, followed by an M.D. from the Stanford University School of Medicine in 1978. He completed his internship (1978–1979) and residency (1979–1980) at Barnes Hospital, affiliated with Washington University in St. Louis. Liu then pursued an oncology fellowship at Stanford University (1980–1982) and a hematology fellowship at University of California San Francisco, Moffitt Hospital (1982–1985). From 1983 to 1987, he was a postdoctoral fellow in the Department of Microbiology at the University of California at San Francisco, working in the laboratory of Dr. J. Michael Bishop.

== Professional appointments ==
Liu has served as Professor, President Emeritus, and Honorary Fellow at The Jackson Laboratory, where he was previously President and CEO from 2011 to 2021. From 2001 to 2011, he was Executive Director of the Genome Institute of Singapore, and concurrently served as Chairman of the Governing Board of the Health Sciences Authority of Singapore (2007–2011). Prior to that, Liu was Director of the Division of Clinical Sciences at the National Cancer Institute (1996–2001).

At the University of North Carolina at Chapel Hill, he held several academic and leadership roles, including Chief of the Division of Medical Genetics and Professor in the Departments of Medicine, Epidemiology, Biochemistry, and Biophysics (1995–1996), Associate Professor (1993–1995), and Assistant Professor in Medicine and Oncology (1987–1993). He also directed the NIH-designated Specialized Program of Research Excellence in Breast Cancer from 1992 to 1996.

== Research ==
Liu's scientific research has focused on the functional genomics of human cancers, particularly breast cancer (identifying the tandem duplicator phenotype genomic configuration), discovering new oncogenes (AXL family of receptor tyrosine kinases), and deciphering the dynamics of gene regulation on a genomic scale that modulates cancer biology. His work has spanned basic to population sciences to translation to the clinic. He has authored over 320 scientific papers and reviews, and co-authored two books.
