= BALB/c =

Laboratory-bred strain of the house mouse

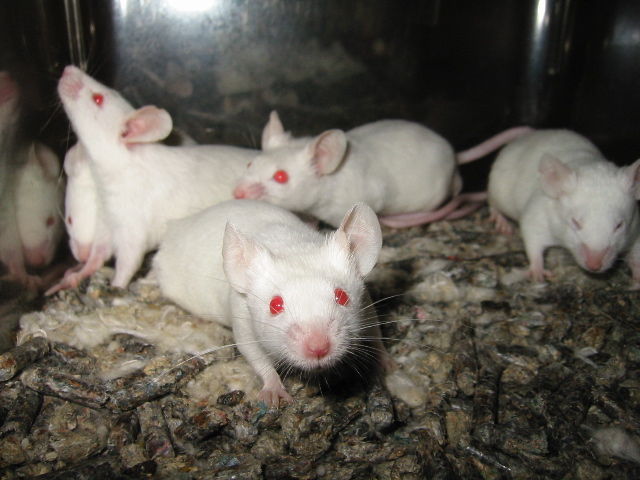

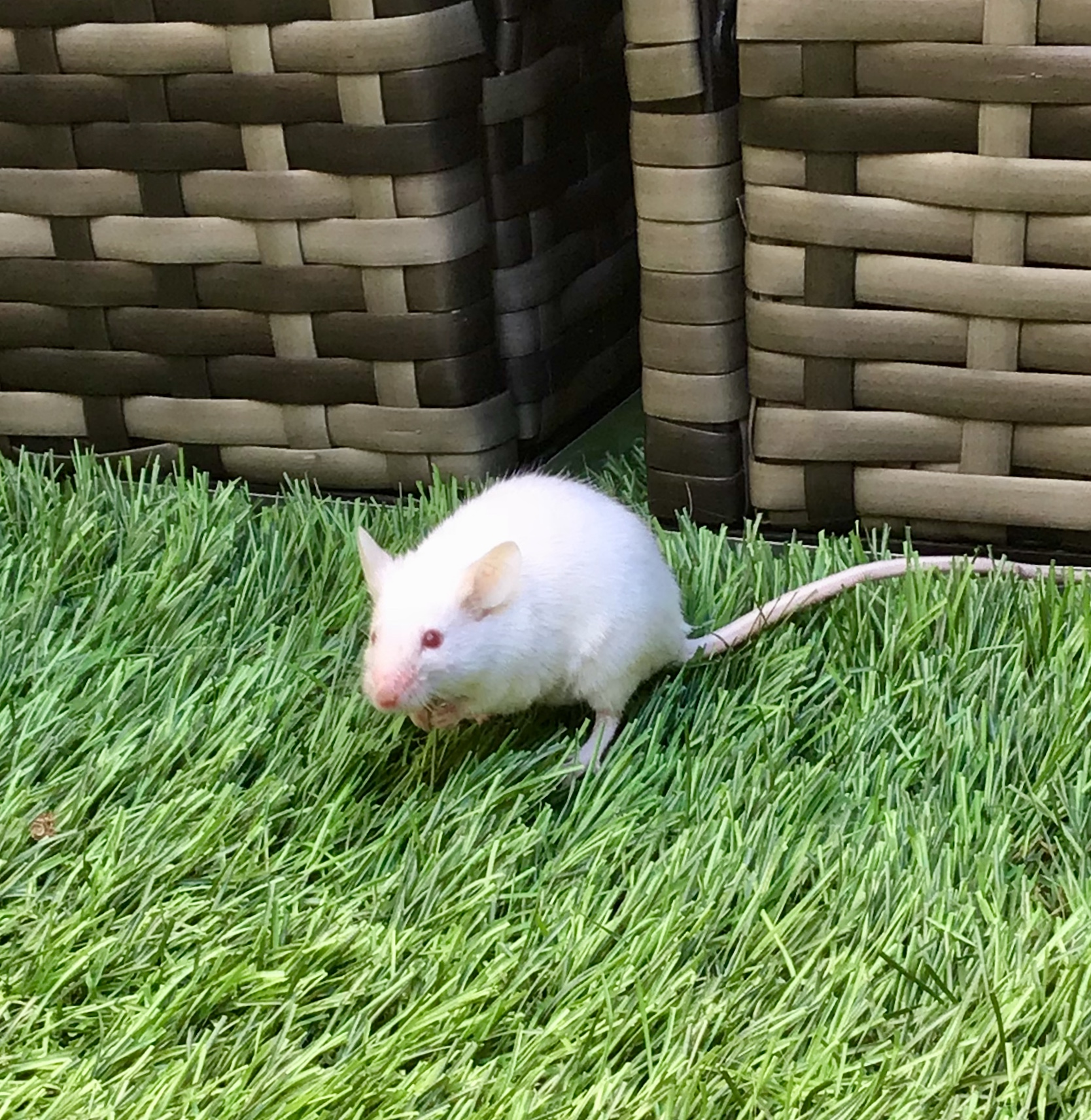

BALB/c is an albino, laboratory-bred strain of the house mouse from which a number of common substrains are derived. Now over 200 generations from New York in 1920, BALB/c mice are distributed globally, and are among the most widely used inbred strains used in animal experimentation.

== History ==
The founding animals of the strain were obtained by Halsey J. Bagg of Memorial Hospital, New York, from a mouse dealer in Ohio in 1913. The name BALB is a portmanteau of "Bagg" and "Albino." From 1920, the progeny of the original colony were systematically inbred, sibling to sibling, for 26 generations over 15 years. During this time, the colony passed through the care of a number of scientists, including C.C. Little and E.C. MacDowell at the Carnegie Institution of Washington and H.J. Muller at the University of Texas at Austin. By 1935 the animals were in the possession of Muller's student, George Davis Snell, who moved them to The Jackson Laboratory. This stock provided the basis of all the BALB/c substrains that are now in use around the world.

Snell provided some animals from this stock to the National Institutes of Health (NIH) to maintain. In 1961 D. W. Bailey used some of these to generate a substrain at the University of California, San Francisco. In 1974, now 136 generations from the original breeding pair, these animals were returned to The Jackson Laboratory and were named BALB/cByJ. On 16 November 2005, The Jackson Laboratory reported this substrain had reached its 235th generation.

Snell also provided a colleague, J. Paul Scott, with some BALB/c breeding stock in 1938 or 1939. When a fire destroyed the main Jackson Laboratory buildings in 1947, all of Snell's original breeding stock perished, but Scott's mice were in a different building and survived. Scott donated stock back, at generation 41, to repopulate the colony. The progeny of these are now termed BALB/cJ and, as of 14 December 2006, were 221 generations from the founding stock. Other less popular substrains, such as BALB/cWt, are maintained at the Jackson Laboratory, while the BALB/cN substrain is maintained by the NIH.

== Characteristics ==
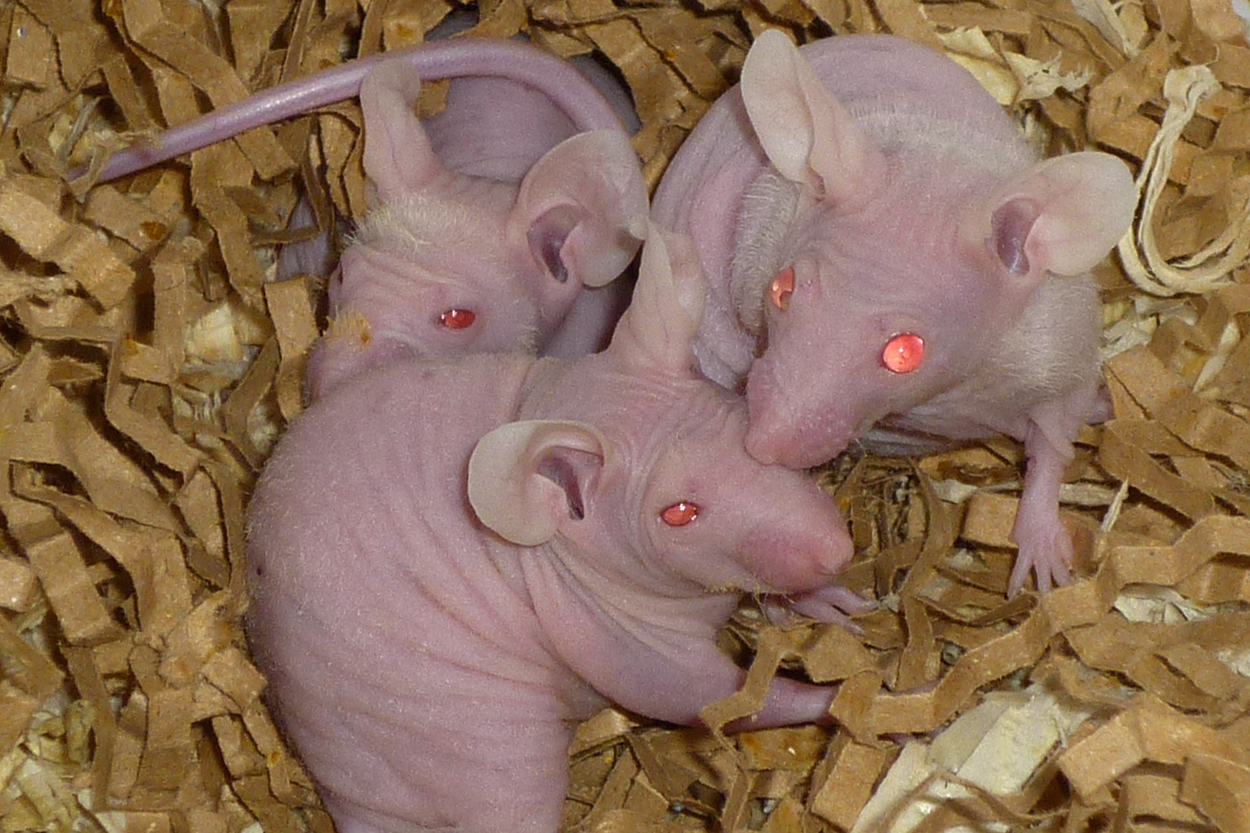
BALB/c nude mice from University of Tartu, which lack a thymus and are unable to produce T-cells and are therefore immunodeficient

BALB/c mice are useful for research into both cancer and immunology. According to Michael Festing's Inbred Strains of Mice, BALB/c substrains are "particularly well known for the production of plasmacytomas on injection with mineral oil," an important process for the production of monoclonal antibodies. They are also reported as having a "low mammary tumour incidence", but do develop other types of cancers in later life, most commonly reticular neoplasms, lung tumours, and renal tumours. Most substrains have a "long reproductive life-span", are noted for displaying high levels of anxiety and for being relatively resistant to diet-induced atherosclerosis, making them a useful model for cardiovascular research.

There are noted differences between different BALB/c substrains, though these are thought to be due to mutation rather than genetic contamination. For example, male BALB/c mice are aggressive and will fight other males if housed together. However, the BALB/Lac substrain is much more docile. The BALB/cWt is also unusual in that 3% of progeny display true hermaphroditism.

The BALB/cJ mice have a medium lifespan of about 17 months for males and 20 months for females, and the body weight at 9 weeks after birth is about 27 g (0.95 oz) for males and 21 g (0.74 oz) for females.

The BALB/c mouse is used as a preclinical model to study age-related bone loss and osteoporosis. With aging, these mice show a progressive decrease in bone mineral density and deterioration of bone microarchitecteur. these changes lead to reduced bone strength, making BALB/c mice a useful model for investigating bone aging and osteoporosis mechanisms.

== See also ==
- Animal model
- Animal testing on rodents
- C57BL/6
