= Taconic Biosciences =

American biotechnology company

- Industry: Biotechnology, Genetic engineering, Mouse genetics
- Founded: 1952
- Founder: Robert Phelan
- Headquarters: Germantown, New York
- Revenue: $259 million (2023)
- Website: taconic.com

Taconic Biosciences is a private biotechnology company specializing in genetically engineered mouse and rat models, microbiome, immuno-oncology mouse models, and integrated model design and breeding services. The company was founded in 1952 as Taconic Farms. The company has three service laboratories and six breeding facilities in the U.S. and Europe, and is headquartered in Rensselaer, New York.

== Company overview ==
Taconic Biosciences is a breeder and supplier of laboratory animals operating in over 50 countries. The current CEO is Nancy J. Sandy. As of 2016, the company has over 800 employees and 1300 customers.

They produce selectively bred and genetically engineered mice and rats for research use.

== History ==
The predecessor to Taconic Farms was "Dow B. Hover Laboratory Animals", founded in the late 1930s, by New York State executioner Dow Hover, who sold it in 1949 to Robert Phelan, who began shipping mice from his garage in Canajoharie, NY. In 1952, Phelan purchased farmland in Germantown, NY, to expand operations. Phelan died in 1955, leaving the company to his wife, Sally, and sons, Joseph, Richard, and Samuel.

In 1963, the National Cancer Institute contracted the company to provide BDF1 mice. The company began offering rats in 1969, including Sprague Dawley, one of the most popular breeds of laboratory rats. That same year, Taconic became the first breeder to receive full accreditation from the American Association for the Accreditation of Laboratory Animals.

The National Institutes of Health contracted Taconic in 1970 to provide them with Sprague Dawley rats and BDF1 mice.

In 1975, Taconic began offering the SHR hypertensive rat and the control strain, Winstar Kyoto (WKY).

In the 1980s, Taconic developed the first Isolated Barrier Unit system, a method of housing rodents in a pathogen-free environment. The company began offering Fischer 344 rats and asthmatic rats from Merck-Frost, Montreal, to the product offerings in 1982, and in 1985 was contracted to supply MPF and germ-free animals for the NASA space shuttle missions. That same year, Taconic also started producing BALB/c mice.

Taconic became the first commercial provider of the C.B-17 SCID mouse model in 1991.

In 1994, Taconic was contracted with the National Institute for Allergy and Infectious Disease to maintain a repository of inbred, congenic, and transgenic mice.

The company changed its name from Taconic Farms to Taconic Biosciences in late 2014.

Taconic was Acquired by H.I.G. Capital in 2019. In April of that same year, the company launched TruBIOME, a platform that “enables researchers to develop models with customized microbiota profiles.”

In 2022, Taconic was acquired by Avista Capital Partners

In January 2023, the company announced they had, in partnership with Cure Rare Disease, developed a “knock-in mouse model,” which carries a mutation known to cause ADSSL1- gene-related myopathy.

== Acquisitions ==
In 2001, the company announced it acquired Anmed Laboratories.

In 2002, Taconic announced it acquired M&B Breeding (Denmark).

In December 2009, the company announced it acquired Xenogen Biosciences.
