= Robert Tryon =

American behavioral psychologist (1901–1967)

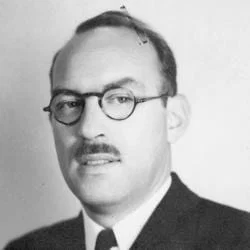
Robert Choate Tryon (1939)

Robert Choate Tryon (September 4, 1901 – September 27, 1967) was an American behavioral psychologist, who pioneered the study of hereditary trait inheritance and learning in animals. His series of experiments with laboratory rats showed that animals can be selectively bred for greater aptitude at certain intelligence tests, but that this selective breeding does not increase the general intelligence of the animals.

== Life ==
Tryon was born in Butte, Montana on September 4, 1901. He spent most of his life at the University of California, Berkeley. He received his AB degree from the undergraduate school in 1924, and as a graduate student he earned his Ph.D. in 1928 with a thesis titled Individual differences at successive stages of learning. After graduating from the school he spent two years as a National Research Council fellow. In 1931, he became a faculty member of the college's Department of Psychology, of which he was a member for 31 years. During the War, he served in Washington DC as the deputy chief of the planning staff for the Office of Strategic Services. Aside from that short period, he was always in Berkeley. On September 27, 1967, he died in Berkeley, California.

== Work ==
In the 1940s, influenced by the studies of his former professor Edward C. Tolman, Tryon decided to test the theory that intelligence is an inherited trait. To do this, he tested the ability of laboratory rats to navigate a maze: rats who took fewer wrong turns to get through the maze and reach the food at the end were termed "maze-bright", while those who took many wrong turns were termed "maze-dull". Tryon then interbred the maze-bright rats with other maze-brights, and maze-dull rats with other maze-dulls. With each successive generation, the ability to navigate the maze increased in the brights and decreased in the dulls. Known as Tryon's Rat Experiment, this study was highly influential in the field of psychology for showing that specific behavioral traits may be hereditary.

Tryon was also a pioneer in the use of cluster analysis to analyze data. His 1939 monogra$h Cluster Analysis was one of the first works to outline a cluster analysis method, and he continued to develop this method over the course of his career.
