= Japanese house mouse =

Scientific classification
- Kingdom: Animalia
- Phylum: Chordata
- Class: Mammalia
- Order: Rodentia
- Family: Muridae
- Genus: Mus
- Species: M. musculus
- Subspecies: M. m. molossinus

Trinomial name
- Mus musculus molossinus Temminck, 1845

Subspecies of mammal

The Japanese house mouse or Japanese wild mouse (Mus musculus molossinus) is a type of house mouse that originated in Japan. Genetically, it is a hybrid between the southeastern Asian house mouse (M. m. castaneus) and the eastern European house mouse (M. m. musculus). It is thus not a unique subspecies, but is treated as such for its characteristic features. It is among the smallest house mice. Different strains such as MSM/Ms, JF1, Japanese waltzing mouse, C57BL/6J and MSKR exist following cross breeding with other house mice, and are used in different genetic and medical investigations.

== Description ==
The adults can be easily distinguished from common laboratory mice from their size and body colours. They are slightly smaller, and they have characteristic two-coloured body, agouti with white bellies. The two colours are not marked by a distinct margin but fused as the colour fades. The tail is also bi-coloured, white with a black tip. Adult females measure 8.1 cm in length without tail, much larger than males, which are 7.2 cm without the tail. Their tails can be up to 13.8 cm long for males, and 16.2 cm for females.

== Taxonomy ==
Based on classical taxonomy, the Japanese house mouse was first described by Dutch zoologist Coenraad Jacob Temminck as a unique species, Mus molossinus in 1845 from a specimen discovered in Nagasaki. The Japanese zoologist Nagamichi Kuroda adopted this classification in 1940 to describe many species of house mice including subspecies under the species. German zooligists Ernst Schwarz and Henriette K. Schwarz redescribed it as a subspecies under Mus musculus in 1943. The subspecies status was used as valid classification. In 1981, an American zoologist Joe Truesdell Marshall revised Kuroda's taxonomy and merged all subspecies under M. molossinus into the subspecies M. m. molossinus. In 1988, Japanese researchers found that the subspecies is not unique as they are the products of natural hybridisation between other mice subspecies, although they are still treated as subspecies.

== Origin ==
Genetic analysis of the mitochondrial DNA in 1988 revealed that Japanese house mice originated from gene mixing (hybridisation) between southeastern Asian house mouse and the eastern European house mouse. Further genetic studies supported this finding. Analysis of nuclear genome shows that hybridisation mainly occurred at intersection of the northern and southern regions of the Japanese mainland, and the Japanese wild mouse was created at the eastern region of the hybridisation zone. The southeastern Asian house mouse appeared to have inhabited Japan first. It is possible that these mice arrived from the northern side of the island. The eastern European house mouse then invaded Japanese mainland from the southern end, and gradually progressed towards the northern region. The southeastern Asian house mouse could have arrived sometime in 1-1.5 B.C.E from Yunnan, southern China; while the eastern European house mouse arrived a little after 1 B.C.E.

== Types and uses ==
=== MSM/Ms ===
The standard name is an abbreviation MISHIMA/Mishima designating the place of its origin, Mishima, a city of Shizuoka Prefecture, Japan, as first described in 2009. It is an inbred strain that is widely used in the study of genetic linkage for its old genetic divergence from the original house mouse about 1 million years ago. In addition, its unique biological features make it a model animal in other genetic and disease investigations. It is smaller than other laboratory mice and exhibits high locomotor activity. It is also resistant to experimentally induced high-fat-diet diabetes, age-onset hearing loss, inflammation, and carcinogenesis. It is also used in stem cell research using it cell line called ES.

=== Japanese fancy mouse 1 (JF1) ===
This is another inbred strain that is popularly used as a fancy mouse. Genome analysis shows that JF1 emerged as a reproductive fusion (introgression) of M. m. molossinus into European house mouse (M. m. domesticus). It was first described in 1998 when it was identified to have a recessive piebald (s) allele. Genome analysis indicates that it was domesticated in Japan in the 18th century and was introduced to Europe in the second half of the 19th century. It became one of the main animal models in genetics in America in the early 20th century.

=== Japanese waltzing mouse ===
This is also a Japanese fancy mouse but an outbred strain in Europe. It is one of the first models used to test Mendelian inheritance by cross-breeding with other house mice. Its name is given for its habit of running around in the cage as in waltz. The first demonstration of Mendel's laws in animals was published by a British zoologist Arthur Dukinfield Darbishire in 1904 using this strain. It was from this research that the British scientist J. B. S. Haldane was inspired to conduct an experiment and first demonstrated genetic linkage in mammals in 1915 with the help of his sister Naomi and a friend Alexander Dalzell Sprunt. In the early 20th century, the mouse was an ideal model for production of different coat and eye colours, including fancy race mice, based on Mendelian genetics. The strain is closely related to JF1 and genome analysis suggests that it was created from cross-breeding the JF1 with European house mouse (fancy mouse) in the 19th century.

=== C57BL/6J ===
This black coloured mouse is a sub-strain of C57BL/6 created in 1921 by C. C. Little at the Bussey Institute for Research in Applied Biology. It is used widely in genetics, toxicology and as pet. The majority of the genome is from M. m. domesticus, while smaller portion is of M. m. molossinus.

=== MSKR ===
This strain was established in 1998 from Kansai region. It has genetic similarity to C57BL/6N, and generally differs from other inbred stains. It has been used as a model in the study of tawny coat colouration and immunology.
