= Tryon's Rat Experiment =

Psychology experiment

Tryon's Rat Experiment is a psychology experiment conducted by Robert Tryon in 1940 and published in the Yearbook of the National Society for Studies in Education. The study is seen as a landmark in the nature versus nurture debate.

== Experiment set-up ==
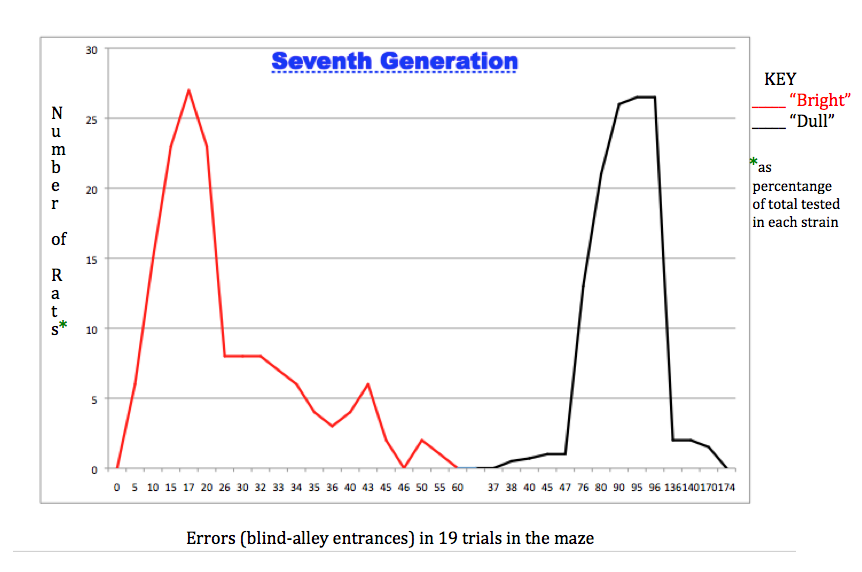
Tyron's rat chart

Prior to Robert Tryon’s study of Selective breeding in rats, concluded in 1942, many psychologists believed that environmental, rather than genetic, differences produced individual behavioral variations. Tryon sought to demonstrate that genetic traits often did, in fact, contribute to behavior. To do so, Tryon created an experiment that tested the proficiency of successive generations of rats in completing a maze. He initiated the experiment by exposing a genetically diverse group of rats to the maze, labeling those who made the fewest errors “bright”, and those with the most errors “dull”. Tryon then mated the “bright” males with “bright” females, and “dull” males with “dull” females. After their children matured, Tryon repeated the maze test with them, and again separated the “bright” and the “dull”, again breeding “bright” with “bright” and “dull” with “dull”. Tryon continued this process for seven generations, creating two distinct breeds of “bright” and “dull” rats. In order to demonstrate that behavior had little effect on the genetically selectively bred rats, and lessen the chance of error when making his conclusions, Tryon cross-fostered the rats—that is, he had a “dull” mother raise “bright” children, and vice versa. The independent variables in his experiment were the parental pairings, the choice of environment and parents for upbringing, and number of rats put through the maze. The dependent variable was the number of errors made by the rats in 19 trials of the maze.

== Implications and conclusions ==
Although Tryon's results showed that the "bright" rats made significantly fewer errors in the maze than the "dull" rats did, questions persist on what other sensory, motor, motivational, and learning processes also influenced the results of the experiment. Common misconceptions of this experiment and other similar experiments are the observed change in the performance in the maze directly correlating with general learning ability. It has become a widely accepted belief among behavior geneticists that the superiority of the bright rats may have been confined to Tryon's specific test; thus, the results may not necessarily be due to a difference in learning capacity between the two groups of rats. Genetic variation, such as better peripheral vision, can make some rats "bright" and others "dull", but it does not determine their intelligence. Nonetheless, Tryon's famous rat-maze experiment demonstrated that the difference between rat performances had a prominent genetic factor since their environments were adequately controlled and identical.

== See also ==
- Behavioural genetics
- Artificial selection
- Gene-environment interaction
