= Leo Loeb =

German-American physician, educator and experimental pathologist

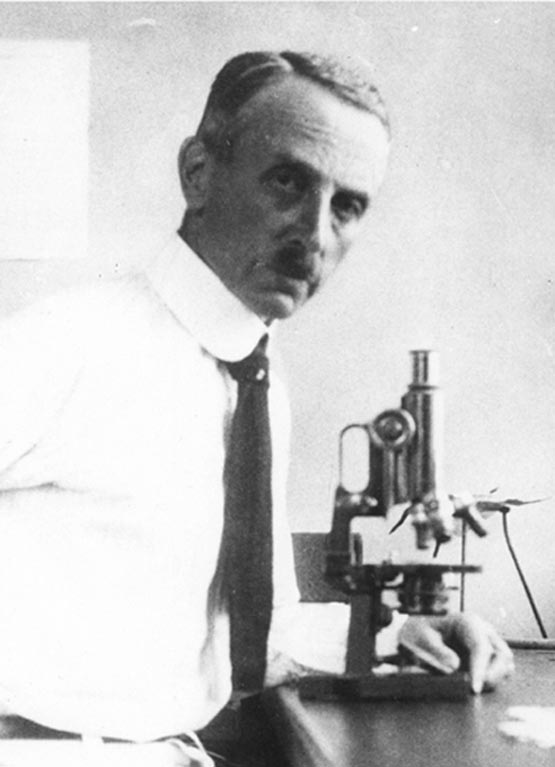
- Leo Loeb, MD, in 1915.
- Born: September 21, 1869; Mayen, Kingdom of Prussia
- Died: December 28, 1959 (aged 90); St. Louis, Missouri, United States
- Citizenship: United States
- Education: University of Zurich (MD)
- Known for: Research on cancer & endocrinology
- Scientific career
- Fields: Medicine & Pathology
- Workplaces: University of Chicago; University of Illinois at Chicago; McGill University; University of Pennsylvania; Washington University in St. Louis

Leo Loeb (September 21, 1869 – December 28, 1959), was a German-American physician, educator, and experimental pathologist.

== Early life ==
Loeb, son of a Jewish family from the German Eifel region, was born in 1869 in Mayen, Kingdom of Prussia. He was orphaned as a child and grew up in the care of an uncle. Because of ill health, Leo was educated in schools that were located in German "spa" towns. As a teenager, he enrolled at the University of Heidelberg, but his tenure there was short. Indeed, over the succeeding couple of years, he spent only brief periods at several universities, in Berlin, Freiburg, and Basel, unable to focus his interests. Finally, in 1890, Loeb entered the University of Zurich Medical School. This time he remained in place, except for external sojourns to Edinburgh, London, and the United States for external clinical experiences. Leo received his M.D. in 1897. For his senior thesis, he had done research on skin transplantation in animals; that experience, combined with the influence of his older brother, Jacques Loeb, who was a physiologist, led Loeb to decide to pursue a career in experimental medicine.

== Career ==
His brother had a teaching position at the University of Chicago, and Leo moved to that city from Europe after completing his medical degree. Following a brief period of practicing clinical medicine—which he disliked—Loeb took a position as a lecturer at the College of Medicine of the University of Illinois and the University of Chicago. At those institutions, he taught experimental methodology, and, at intervals, was also a visiting scholar at Johns Hopkins University. Loeb became interested in blood coagulation and the growth properties of malignant cells. As an outgrowth of the latter topic, Loeb developed the cell culture technique as applied to both normal and abnormal tissues.

Loeb was next asked to join the faculty at McGill University in Montreal; however, that posting lasted only one year because of his inability to acclimatize himself to the harsh Canadian winter. He moved to the University of Pennsylvania in Philadelphia in 1903, beginning a series of important experiments on the influence on cancer growth by reproductive hormones. In 1907, Loeb published a study which showed that breast carcinoma in mice could be hereditary, as it is now known to be in some human cases.

Loeb was one of the co-founders of the American Association for Cancer Research in 1907, and served as its president in 1911-1912.

By 1910, Loeb had acquired a national reputation for his work on cancer. He was invited to become the director of the Barnard Free Skin & Cancer Hospital in St. Louis, a center that was attached to Washington University in St. Louis. This was a novel institution, in that its emphasis was on clinical research, even though Barnard was indeed a hospital for humans. At the time Loeb collaborated with rodent breeder Abbie Lathrop. Using inbred mouse strains they could show that the growth of mammary tumors varies within different strains of mice and can be reduced by removal of the ovaries. That work predated clinical application of the same concept in human breast cancer by several decades.

In 1915, Loeb was appointed as professor of comparative pathology at Washington University School of Medicine (WUSM). In 1924, Loeb was given the chairmanship of pathology at WUSM; thereafter, he continued his work on tissue transplantation and cell culture, as well as research on endocrine disease. Loeb was known as a patient, kind, and helpful mentor to younger colleagues in the department.

Loeb retired from doing active research in 1941, at the age of 72. From then on, he concentrated on the meaning of his findings in an increasingly existential context. This train of thought was reflected in another publication, in 1945, of a book entitled The Biological Basis of Individuality. Loeb proposed three levels of human thought-- "hypnosuggestion;" "reasoning thought;" and "thoughts and interests represented by problems of philosophy and science."

== Personal life and death ==
Having long deferred family life to concentrate on his research, Loeb Married Dr. Georgiana Sands, a practicing physician, in 1922, when he was 53. After their marriage, Georgiana became his scientific, administrative, and literary partner for the remainder of their lives together. They remained in St. Louis until his death at the age of 90 on December 28, 1959. Georgiana died less than 6 months later on June 5, 1960, at the age of 88.

== Awards and honors ==
Loeb was elected to the American Philosophical Society in 1910. He was elected to the United States National Academy of Sciences in 1937.
