= Congenic =

Taxonomic description

In genetics, two organisms that differ in only one locus and a linked segment of chromosome are defined as congenic. Similarly, organisms that are coisogenic differ in one locus only and not in the surrounding chromosome. Unlike congenic organisms, coisogenic organisms cannot be bred and only occur through spontaneous or targeted mutation at the locus.

== Generating congenic strains ==
Congenic strains are generated in the laboratory by mating two inbred strains (usually rats or mice), and back-crossing the descendants 5–10 generations with one of the original strains, known as the recipient strain. Typically, selection for either phenotype or genotype is performed prior to each back-cross generation. In this manner, either an interesting phenotype, or a defined chromosomal region assayed by genotype, is passed from the donor strain onto an otherwise uniform recipient background. Congenic mice or rats can then be compared to the pure recipient strain to determine whether they are phenotypically different if selection was for a genotypic region, or to identify the critical genetic locus, if selection was for a phenotype.

Speed congenics can be produced in as little as five back-cross generations, through the selection at each generation of offspring that not only retain the desired chromosomal fragment, but also 'lose' the maximum amount of background genetic information from the donor strain. This is also known as marker-assisted congenics, due to the use of genetic markers, typically microsatellite markers, but now, more commonly, single nucleotide polymorphism markers (SNPs). The process can be further aided by the superovulation of females, to produce many more eggs.

== See also ==
- Gene knockout
