= Jackson Laboratory =

Biomedical research institution

Coordinates: 44.3655°N 68.1965°W

The Jackson Laboratory

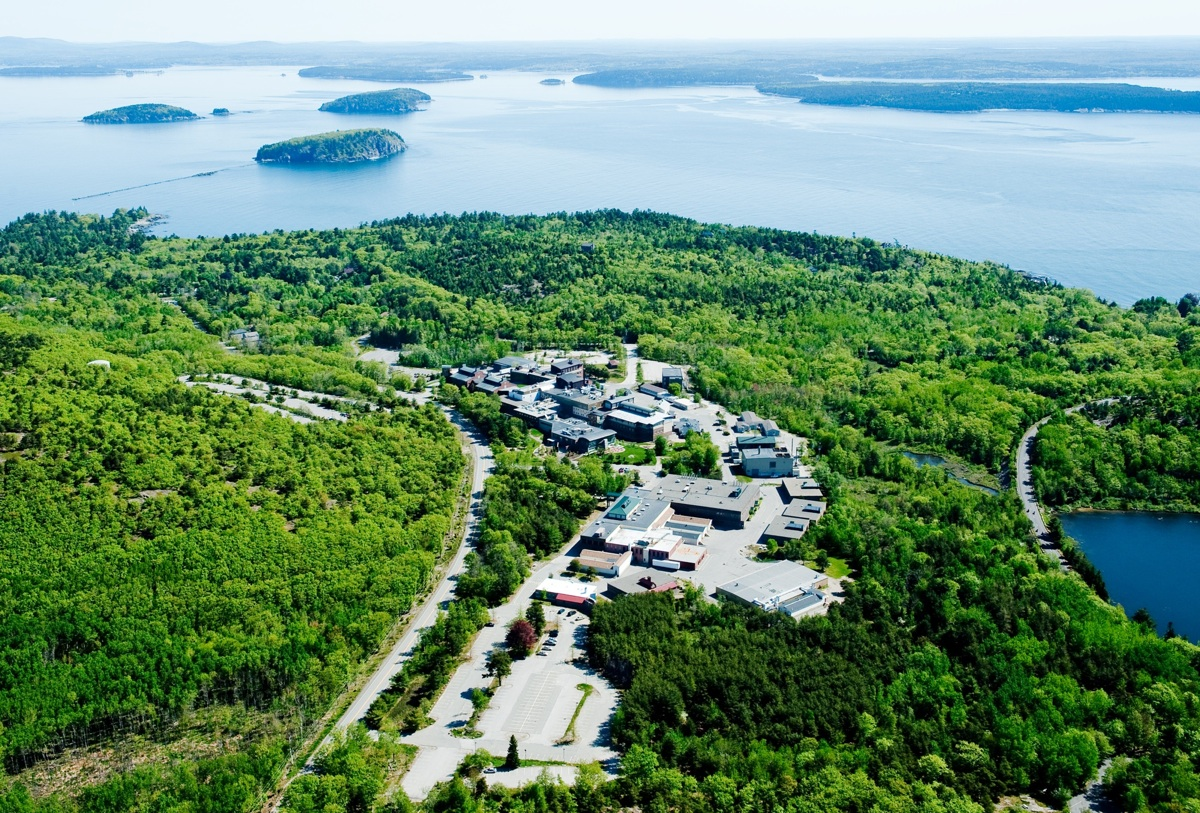
- Aerial view of The Jackson Laboratory campus in Bar Harbor, Maine
- Established: May 4, 1929; 97 years ago
- Founder: C. C. Little
- Type: Nonprofit organization Research institute
- Headquarters: Bar Harbor, Maine, U.S.
- Locations: Farmington, Connecticut, Sacramento, California, Shanghai, China, Yokohama, Japan
- Products: Mice, C57BL/6J; Model Organisms; Laboratory Animals
- Fields: Cancer; Aging; Alzheimer's disease; Addiction; Computational biology
- Leader: Lon Cardon
- Budget: $628M (2023)
- Staff: 3,000
- Website: jax.org

The Jackson Laboratory (often abbreviated as JAX) is an independent, non-profit biomedical research institution which was founded by Clarence Cook Little in 1929. It employs over 3,000 employees in Bar Harbor, Maine; Sacramento, California; Farmington, Connecticut; Shanghai, China; and Yokohama, Japan. The institution is a National Cancer Institute-designated Cancer Center and has NIH Centers of Excellence in aging and systems genetics. According to the organization, its mission is "to discover the genetic basis for preventing, treating and curing human diseases, and to enable research and education for the global biomedical community."

The laboratory also provides more than 13,000 strains of mouse models to more than 2,400 organizations in 68 countries around the world. The Jackson Laboratory hosts the Mouse Genome Informatics (MGI) database, and it also organizes scientific courses, conferences, and training programs.

== Major research areas ==
The Jackson Laboratory has two research campuses, the Jackson Laboratory for Mammalian Genetics located in Bar Harbor, Maine, and the Jackson Laboratory for Genomic Medicine located in Farmington, Connecticut. Each campus maintains affiliations with a variety of other academic institutions. In the Bar Harbor location, cooperative Ph.D. training is offered in conjunction with the University of Maine and Tufts University. At the Jackson Laboratory for Genomic Medicine, cooperative Ph.D. training is offered in conjunction with the University of Connecticut Health Center. There are more than 60 faculty members maintaining independent labs across these campuses, who perform research in six primary areas:

- Cancer: The Jackson Laboratory Cancer Center (JAXCC) has a National Cancer Institute-designated Cancer Center. Cancer areas of focus include: brain, leukemia, lung, lymphoma, prostate, breast; cancer initiation and progression; cancer prevention and therapies
- Development/reproductive biology: birth defects, Down syndrome, osteoporosis, fertility
- Immunology: HIV/AIDS, anemia, autoimmunity, cancer immunology, immune system disorders, lupus, tissue transplant rejection, vaccines
- Metabolic diseases: atherosclerosis, cardiovascular disease, diabetes, high blood pressure, obesity
- Neurobiology: blindness, Alzheimer's, deafness, epilepsy, glaucoma, macular degeneration, neurodegenerative diseases
- Neurobehavioral disorders: autism, addiction, depression

== History ==
The Jackson Laboratory was founded by Clarence Cook Little, a former University of Maine and University of Michigan president, in 1929 in Bar Harbor, Maine under the name Roscoe B. Jackson Memorial Laboratory with the purpose of discovering the causes of cancer and other diseases through research on mammals. The campus was built on 13 acres (5.3 ha) of land donated by George Dorr. Initial funding for the laboratory campus came from Edsel Ford, the son of Henry Ford, and from Roscoe B. Jackson, a one-time head of the Hudson Motor Car Company, for whom the institution is named. As well as providing funds for the first laboratory building, Roscoe B. Jackson provided support for the first five years of operation.

The sale of mouse animal models began in 1933 with early sales to the United States Public Health Service and now The Jackson Laboratory is one of the world's largest suppliers of laboratory mice for biomedical research. In particular, the C57BL/6J strain, which is widely used and cited is maintained at The Jackson Laboratory. The demand for mice generated at The Jackson Lab increased in 1937 when the Surgeon General supported a grant from National Cancer Institute to the lab that made mice produced there a de facto industry standard due to federal standardization requirements because it was the only large-scale mouse provider before World War II.

The research performed at The Jackson Laboratory is associated with at least 26 Nobel Prizes in Physiology or Medicine via research, resources, or educational programming. Some notable findings from the institution include:

- Established that cancer is a genetic disorder, a novel concept before the Laboratory's founding in 1929.
- Dr. Leroy Stevens first described cells that can develop into different tissues – today known as stem cells.
- Dr. Elizabeth Russell performed the first bone marrow transplants in a mammal, leading to new treatments for blood and immunological diseases.
- Dr. George Snell won the Nobel Prize in 1980 for providing an in-depth understanding of the immune system's major histocompatibility complex, making organ transplants possible.
- Dr. Douglas L. Coleman discovered the hormone leptin, central to obesity and diabetes research, earning him the Shaw Prize, the Albert Lasker Award, the Gairdner International Award, Frontiers of Knowledge Award in Biomedicine, and the King Faisal International Prize in Medicine.
- Use of cancer avatars – mice with implanted human tumors – to test targeted therapies for cancer patients.
- Recent research has examined cancer stem cells, leukemia, type 1 diabetes, lupus, and mammalian lifespan.

=== Highlights ===
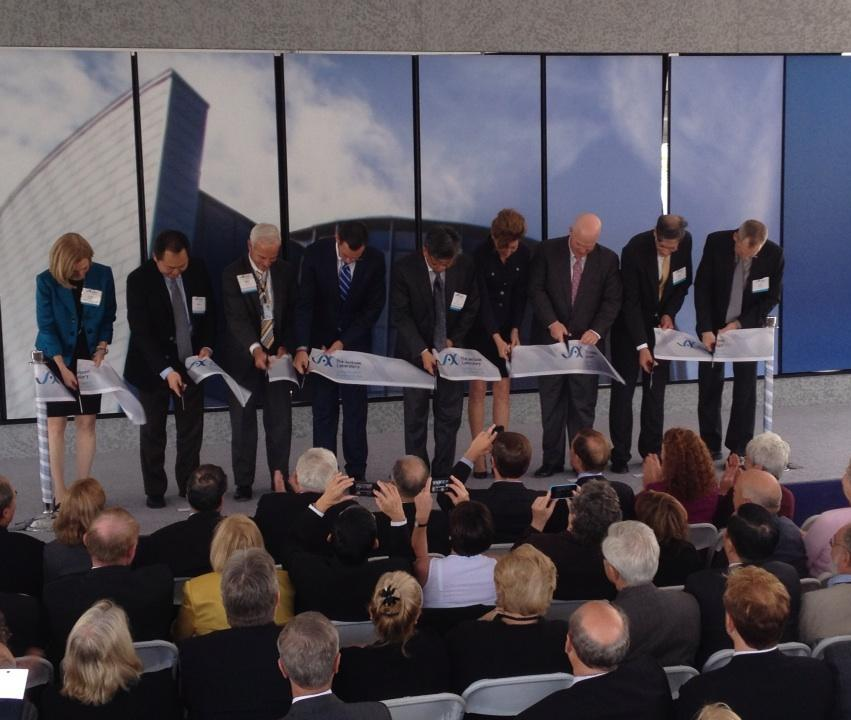
Ribbon cutting at the Jackson Laboratory for Genomic Medicine dedication ceremony in October 2014

- A grant from the National Institute of General Medical Sciences funds the development of new computational tools to understand how multiple genes interact in complex diseases.
- The National Institute on Aging provides $25 million to develop new treatments, future therapies based on precision modeling.
- The National Institutes of Health (NIH) funds phase 2 of the Knockout Mouse Production and Phenotyping Project (KOMP2).
- Researchers link mutations to butterfly-shaped pigment dystrophy, an inherited macular disease.
- Jackson Laboratory researchers discover mutation involved in neurodegeneration.
- The Jackson Laboratory for Genomic Medicine opens in Farmington, Connecticut in October 2014.
- In October 2020, it received a $11.8M USD grant from Harold Alfond Foundation.

=== The Jackson Laboratory Cancer Center ===
The Jackson Laboratory Cancer Center (JAXCC) first received its National Cancer Institute designation in 1983 in recognition of the foundational cancer research conducted there. The JAXCC is one of seven NCI-designated Cancer Centers with a focus on basic research.

The Jackson Laboratory Cancer Center has a single program, Genetic Models for Precision Cancer Medicine, composed of three biological themes: cancer cell robustness, genomic and genetic complexity, and progenitor cell biology. The themes emphasize the systems genetics of cancer and translational cancer genomics, and all are supported by the JAX Cancer Center's technological initiatives in mouse modeling, genome analytics and quantitative cell biology.

=== The Morrell Park fire ===
On May 10, 1989, a flash fire destroyed the Morrell Park mouse production facility. The fire lasted for five hours, requiring over 100 firefighters from 15 companies and a total of 16 trucks for the fire to be contained. Four workers of the Colwell Construction Company who were installing fiberglass wallboard in the room where the fire broke out were injured, one with burns over 15 percent of his body. While none of the foundation strains were lost, 300,000 production mice (about 50% of their stock) died, resulting in a national shortage of laboratory mice and the layoff of 60 employees.

This was the second fire to severely affect the laboratory; the 1947 fire that burned most of the island destroyed most of the laboratory, and its mice. Worldwide donations of funds and mice allowed the lab to resume operations in 1948.

== Acquisitions ==
In October 2021, Jackson Lab bought Japan-based research animal business from Charles River Laboratories International for US$63 million.

In October 2025, JAX acquired the New York Stem Cell Foundation

== Research resources ==
- Hosts the Mouse Genome Informatics database

== Business model ==
The Jackson Laboratory is recognized by the IRS as a public charity. According to organization literature, revenue comes primarily from the sale of materials and services (~70%) and from government support (~25%). Less than 5% of 2012 revenue came from charitable donations.

== Notable researchers ==
- Edison Liu
- Nadia Rosenthal
- Charles Lee
- Muriel Davisson
- George Weinstock
- Leroy Stevens
- Elizabeth Russell
- George Snell
- Wa Xian

== Controversy ==
In 2013, a jury in Maine found that Jackson Laboratory did not violate that state's whistleblower protection law when they fired an employee who claimed to have been terminated after reporting her concerns about the treatment of animals to the National Institutes of Health Office for Laboratory Animal Welfare. The worker accused the laboratory of "allowing mice to suffer and then die in their cages instead of euthanizing them" and of cutting off the toes of mice to identify them. Jackson Laboratory denied the allegations and stated the worker was fired for her confrontational demeanor.

In 2009, Jackson Laboratory was fined $161,680 by the EPA for improperly handling and storing hazardous materials.

== See also ==
- Highseas, a former Bar Harbor summer estate owned by the laboratory
- Animal Testing
