= Disk-over-water method =

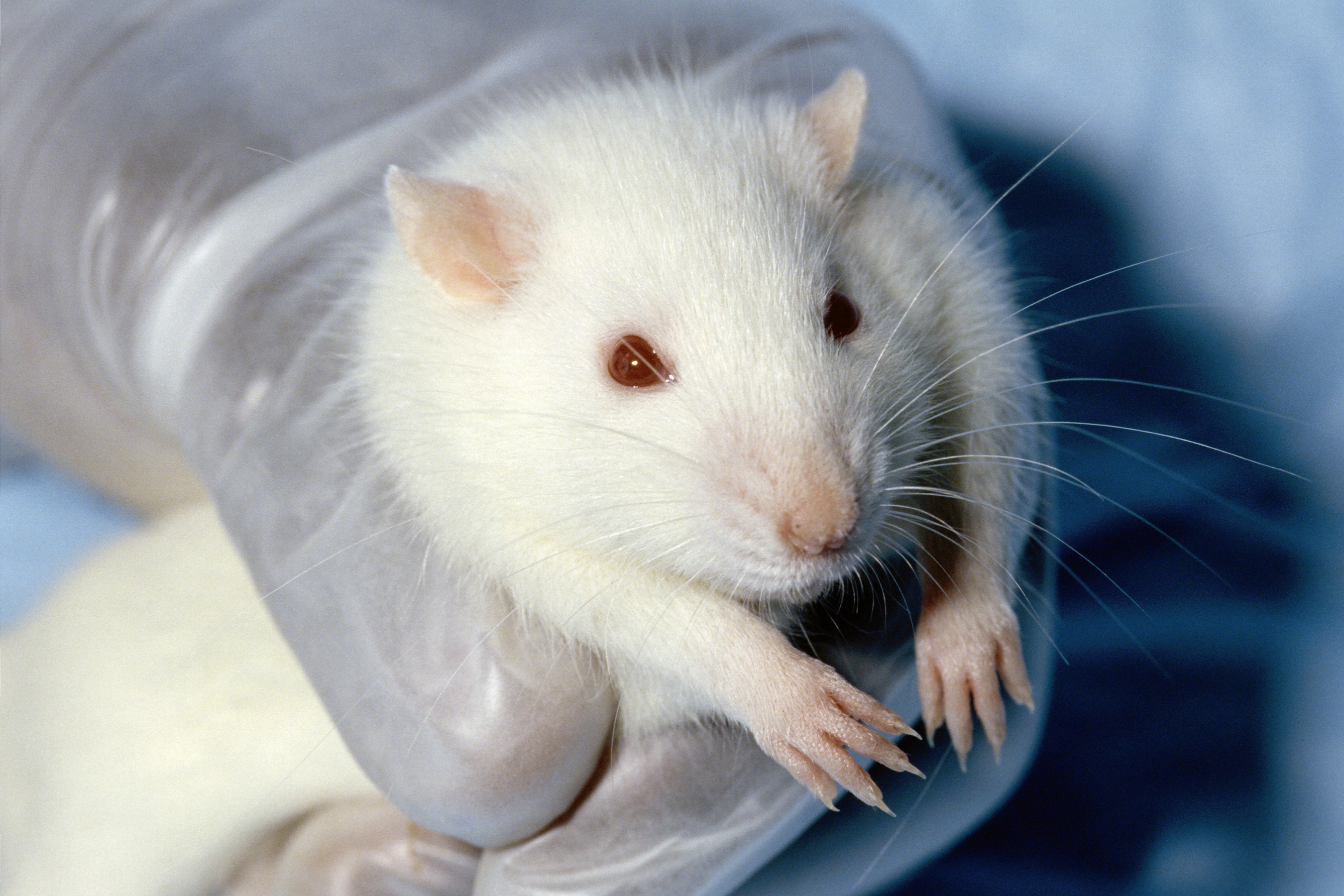
Lab rat

The disk-over-water method is a technique for producing sleep deprivation in laboratory animals.

The subject—for example, a rat or a pigeon—is placed on a disk. When the animal shows signs of falling asleep, the disk begins to rotate slowly, at a few revolutions per minute. To avoid being carried into the surrounding pool of water, the subject must walk to keep pace with the disk.

== Background and applications ==
The disk-over-water (DOW) method was first developed in the early 1980s to study the effects of prolonged sleep deprivation in small mammals. It was later adapted for use in birds. The method allows researchers to maintain continuous wakefulness and to evaluate behavioral, physiological, and neurological consequences of sleep loss under controlled laboratory conditions.

One advantage of the DOW method is that it reduces the need for direct human handling compared to earlier techniques such as manual stimulation or movable cages, while still reliably preventing sleep. However, because the animal is kept under stress and compulsion, the method has been the subject of ethical debate.

== Limitations ==
- Animals may experience short sleep episodes, known as microsleeps, even while being forced to walk.
- Extended experiments may produce secondary effects such as weight loss, immune suppression, and elevated stress hormones.
- To separate the effects of sleep deprivation from those of stress or physical activity, “yoked controls” are often employed: animals are subjected to the same amount of disk movement but at random times, unrelated to their attempts to sleep.

== Ethical considerations ==
Because of the physical and psychological strain imposed on the animals, the disk-over-water method has been controversial. Animal rights groups argue that it conflicts with modern standards of animal welfare and results in unnecessary suffering. Consequently, many ethics committees have called for limiting or replacing this technique with more humane alternatives, such as computer modeling or non-invasive approaches.

== See also ==
- Flowerpot technique
