= International primate trade =

International trade in primates

The international trade in primates sees 32,000 wild non-human primates (NHPs) trapped and sold on the international market every year. They are sold mostly for use in animal testing, but also for food, for exhibition in zoos and circuses, and for private use as companion animals.

== Countries involved ==
The United States imports around one third of all NHPs sold internationally, with the United Kingdom importing the second highest number. Japan, Russia, The Netherlands, France, and Taiwan also rank among the top importing countries.

The NHPs are exported from Indonesia, Malaysia, Kenya, Thailand, Philippines, Mauritius, Amazonian regions across South America, and China, where they exist indigenously. Noveprim Group, Les Campêches Ltd, Biodia Co Ltd, Bioculture (Mauritius) Ltd, Bio Sphère and Prima Cyno Ltd export between 6,000 and 8,000 primates yearly.

== Capture and transport ==
They are caught by local villagers, farmers, and hunters who set traps with baited nets and or by laying bait in crates. Entire families may be caught in the nets, with any undesirable NHPs being killed and sold for food.

Those who survive are taken in crates to holding centers, possibly without food or water. The centers are reportedly overcrowded and dirty; the primates may not be able to stand in the crates, and many die. Others are weeded out because they are ill, too thin, or too old, with females and babies being the most desirable.

According to a 1992 investigation by the British Union for the Abolition of Vivisection, 75% of the NHPs may be killed at the holding centers.

== Animal testing ==
NHPs may be imported into the U.S. and sold for "scientific, educational, or exhibition purposes," and for use in breeding colonies. According to the AESOP Project, the majority of NHPs are imported to the U.S. to be used in laboratories.

23,465 non-human primates destined for laboratories or laboratory suppliers were imported into the U.S. in 2014 including macaques, grivets and capuchins. The majority of these animals were from China, Mauritius, Cambodia and Vietnam, respectively. Fortrea, Charles River Laboratories and SNBL USA are the largest U.S. importers of monkeys destined for laboratories. Between 1995 and 1999, 1,580 wild baboons were imported into the United States.

Airlines have been under "significant pressure" from PETA and other groups to end their transport of monkeys and other animals to laboratories. According to PETA, over 110 airlines refuse to transport monkeys to laboratories, many after being the target of the animal welfare group's campaigns.

As of 2015, Air France remains the last major airline to still transport nonhuman primates to laboratories. While Air France has defended the practice, saying the use of monkeys in research is needed, others including PETA, Jane Goodall, James Cromwell and Peter Gabriel have criticized the airline.

== See also ==
- Animal testing
- Animal testing on non-human primates
- Commodification
- Great Ape Project
- Great Ape research ban
- International Primate Protection League
- Nafovanny
- Shamrock Farm
