= Fortrea =

Contract research organization

Fortrea Holdings Inc.
- Type: Public
- Traded as: Nasdaq: FTRE; S&P 600 component
- Industry: Pharmaceutical industry
- Founded: 1968 as Environmental Sciences Corporation; 1996 as Covance; January 31, 2023; 3 years ago as Fortrea
- Headquarters: Durham, North Carolina, U.S.; operations in over 90 countries
- Key people: Anshul Thakral, President, CEO, Chairman Jill McConnell, CFO
- Services: Contract research organization
- Revenue: ▲US$2.723 billion (2025)
- Operating income: ▼ -US$872 million (2025)
- Net income: ▼ -US$986 million (2025)
- Total assets: ▼US$2.715 billion (2025)
- Total equity: ▼US$563 million (2025)
- Number of employees: Approximately 14,300 (2025)
- Website: fortrea.com

Fortrea Holdings Inc. is an American contract research organization organized in Delaware and headquartered in Durham, North Carolina with operations in approximately 100 countries. Its customers are primarily in the pharmaceutical, biotechnology, and medical device industries.

Its primary business is handling all aspects of clinical trials including phase I through IV clinical trial management, clinical pharmacology, and post-approval services. It handles regulatory affairs, protocol design, operational planning, study and site start-up, patient recruitment, project management, monitoring, data management and biostatistics, pharmacovigilance, medical writing, and mobile clinical services. It focuses on oncology, central nervous system and neurodegenerative, rare diseases, and cell and gene therapies. In the five years ending in 2024, it conducted more than 5,930 clinical trials involving over 1 million subjects, as well as over 500 studies for medical device companies.

The company is one of the largest participants in the international primate trade and is engaged in animal testing, most specifically animal testing on non-human primates.

The company traces its roots to Environmental Sciences Corporation, formed in 1968. It was known as Hazleton from 1972 to 1990, Corning Lab Services from 1990 to 1996, Covance from 1996 to 2021, and Labcorp Drug Development from 2021 to 2023.

The company is ranked 992nd on the Fortune 1000 (76th in the healthcare sector).

== History ==
=== 1968–1999 ===
In 1968, Environmental Sciences Corporation was established in Seattle, Washington, manufacturing equipment related to laboratory animals. In 1972, it acquired and took the name of Hazleton Laboratories, a contract laboratory that conducted toxicology testing. In 1977, Corning Inc. purchased a stake in Hazleton and in 1987, it acquired the remainder of the company for $115 million. By 1982, Hazleton was the largest independent biological testing company and life sciences laboratory in the U.S. and the largest laboratory equipment manufacturer worldwide. The company carried out animal toxicology tests of drugs, cosmetics, pesticides, and industrial chemicals, and bred rhesus monkeys and beagles for its own labs, as well as for chemical and drug companies, hospitals, universities and government agencies. It offered chemical analysis of new compound products for various industries, tested chemicals for gene mutations, and carried out research with monoclonal antibodies. It sold the equipment manufacturing unit in the mid-1980s.

In 1989, Corning Glass Works acquired G.H. Besselaar Associates, which conducted clinical trials for drug approvals. In 1990, Hazleton acquired Microtest, a molecular toxicology center in York, England. Corning Glass Works changed its name to Corning, and folded Besselaar and Hazelton into a new subsidiary, Corning Lab Services. In 1991, Corning Lab Services acquired SciCor.

In 1992, it acquired Philadelphia Association of Clinical Trials. In 1993, Hazleton, Besselaar, and SciCor were combined into Corning Pharmaceutical Services, then Corning Life Sciences.

In 1995, Corning Pharmaceutical Services acquired National Packaging Systems, an Allentown, Pennsylvania-based clinical trial packaging company.

In 1997, Corning completed the corporate spin-off of its laboratory testing business as Quest Diagnostics and its pharmaceutical services business as Covance.

In the fourth quarter of 1998, the company acquired GDXI, which undertakes the capture and interpretation of electrocardiograms, and Berkeley Antibody Company, which provides contract services in custom antibody production, applied immunology, and custom animal testing to support the medical device industry and preclinical evaluations, for a total of $26 million in cash.

=== 2000-present ===
In 2000, the company opened a central laboratory in Singapore, building on clinical-development services formed in Singapore in 1996. In 2013, it expanded the capacity of the laboratory by 50%.

In March 2001, the company sold Covance Pharmaceutical Packaging Services to Fisher Scientific for $137.5 million.

In August 2005, it acquired GFI Clinical Services, an 80-bed clinical pharmacology business, from West Pharmaceutical Services for $5.7 million.

In April 2006, the company acquired eight early phase clinical pharmacology sites from Radiant Research for $65 million.

In June 2006, it acquired Signet Laboratories, a provider of monoclonal antibodies used in the research of cancer, infectious disease, and neurodegenerative disease, for $8.95 million.

In 2007, the company opened a laboratory in Shanghai, China. In 2019, it opened a research and development center in Shanghai.

In August 2008, the company acquired a campus in Greenfield, Indiana from Eli Lilly and Company and executed a 10-year service drug development service agreement with Lilly.

In December 2008, the company acquired a minority equity stake in Caprion Proteomics, a provider of proteomics-based services to the pharmaceutical industry. The company was acquired by Chicago Growth Partners in July 2012.

In 2009, the company acquired the Gene Expression Laboratory from Merck & Co. and entered into a five-year, $145 million contract to provide Merck with genomic analysis services.

In 2010, the company and Sanofi-Aventis created an outsourcing partnership, which, at the time was considered the largest between a contract research organization and a pharmaceutical company. Covance also acquired sites from Sanofi-Aventis in Porcheville, France and Alnwick, United Kingdom.

In 2014, the company acquired Medaxial, a London-based value communication consultancy.

In February 2015, Labcorp acquired Covance for $6.1 billion in cash and stock.

In 2016, the company entered into a strategic alliance with Global Specimen Solutions, in which the company offered GSS products GlobalCODE and snapTRACK to its clients. In December 2017, Covance acquired the company.

In September 2017, the company acquired Chiltern, a specialty contract research organization, for $1.2 billion in cash.

In June 2018, the company acquired Sciformix Corporation, a scientific process outsourcing company focused on pharmacovigilance and regulatory issues for biopharmaceutical and medical devices clients.

In August 2018, Covance Food Solutions was sold to Eurofins Scientific for $670 million.

In June 2019, the company acquired the nonclinical contract research services business of Envigo (now Inotiv), which acquired the research products business of the company.

In the first quarter of 2019, the company spent $47 million to acquire MI Bioresearch, a provider of preclinical capabilities in cell and gene therapy and oncology testing, and Regulatory and Clinical Research Institute (RCRI), a device-focused contract research organization.

In October 2020, the company acquired GlobalCare, a mobile nursing and ambulant care company with operations in more than 65 countries, and snapIoT, a company that provides a digitized clinical platform that supports remote participation in clinical trials.

In June 2021, the company changed its name to Labcorp Drug Development.

In February 2023, the company was renamed Fortrea Holdings. In July 2023, Labcorp completed the corporate spin-off of the company.

In June 2024, the company sold its Endpoint Clinical and Fortrea Patient Access businesses to Arsenal Capital Partners.

== Animal welfare issues ==
=== Reston virus: monkeys with ebola virus brought to U.S. ===
In December 1989, several crab-eating macaques with the Zaire ebolavirus were imported from Mindanao in the Philippines to the company's facility in Reston, Virginia. The strain of the virus became known as the Reston virus. It was the first ebola virus that emerged outside of Africa and was also the first known natural infection of ebola virus in nonhuman primates. The facility was abandoned and torn down and the variant turned out to be non-lethal to humans. The incident was an inspiration for The Hot Zone, a book by Richard Preston published in 1994.

In March 1996, two macaques that had been shipped to the company's facility in Alice, Texas, tested positive for the Ebola virus from a group of 100 obtained from the same supplier. The virus strain was the same non-lethal Reston virus as in the earlier incident.

=== Reports from investigative journalists ===
In 2003, a German investigative journalist sponsored by the British Union for the Abolition of Vivisection (BUAV) filmed 40 hours of undercover footage at the company's primate-testing facility in Münster. Two films were produced, which were shown on German public television in December 2003. The footage showed animal keepers dancing with half-anaesthetized monkeys, making their heads move to the rhythm of the music. It also showed rough treatment of the monkeys by the staff. The monkeys were seen living isolated in small wire cages with little or no natural light and no environmental enrichment, with high noise levels caused by staff shouting and playing the radio, and undergoing surgery with no post-operative care. In response, the company maintained that clips showing different technicians working in different buildings had been edited together, resulting in a sequence of events that did not take place. The company also said there was group housing and pair housing for some monkeys that was not shown. In the films, the treatment of the monkeys was criticized by Jane Goodall. The environment minister for North Rhine-Westphalia asked the public prosecutor to investigate, and said that if the allegations were borne out, the company would lose its licence to keep primates. The company gained an injunction against the video.

From April 2004 to March 2005, an undercover technician, sponsored by People for the Ethical Treatment of Animals (PETA), filmed the treatment of monkeys in the company's lab in Vienna, Virginia. Incidents filmed included the punching of injured monkey, failure to give veterinary care and self-mutilation by monkeys because of "failure to provide psychological enrichment". The United States Department of Agriculture and the Food and Drug Administration investigated the claims and company agreed to a settlement of $8,720 and to fix the infractions. In June 2005, the company filed a lawsuit in the United States against PETA and the investigator for fraud, breach of employee contract, and conspiracy. PETA agreed to hand over all video footage and written notes to the company, and agreed to a ban on conducting any infiltration of the company for five years. The company then dropped the lawsuit. The company filed a parallel lawsuit in England in an attempt to stop PETA showing the tape; the British judge called the footage "highly disturbing", and ruled that there was a legitimate public interest in the material being shown. The case was settled with PETA allowed to continue to publish the video.

=== Celebrity protests of business expansion ===
In 2006, Paul McCartney protested a proposed $175 million animal testing laboratory by the company in Chandler, Arizona. However, the laboratory opened in 2009.

=== Animal welfare citations by the United States Department of Agriculture ===
In June 2011, a report showed that improper housing conditions led to frostbite on the tails of many monkeys.

In February 2012, the company was cited after a monkey died after being entangled by an enrichment device.

In March 2012, the company was cited for housing a monkey in isolation for almost eight months.

=== Deaths of lab monkeys due to hyperthermia ===
The company was fined $31,500 for four violations of the Animal Welfare Act of 1966 after 13 cynomolgus monkeys died from hyperthermia in overheated rooms in September and October 2014. In July 2014, the company had transported monkeys to the facility without providing water or proper care and ignoring signs of weakness and distress. The company said it would add electronic temperature monitoring and alerts.

=== Broken bone injuries in monkeys ===
In November 2023, the company was fined $9,000 due to the injuries of six monkeys between 2018 and 2022, mostly broken bones due to poor handling. After the injuries, four monkeys were euthanized.
