= Nafovanny =

Vietnamese captive-breeding primate facility

Nafovanny's maternity clinic. Photographed undercover by the BUAV. (video)

Nafovanny in Vietnam is the largest captive-breeding primate facility in the world. It supplies crab-eating macaques (Macaca fascicularis) to animal testing laboratories.

== Background ==
Nafovanny was set up in 1994 by Vanny Chian Technology, a Hong Kong company, according to Reuters.

Criticism of the project was expressed by Dr. John Wedderburn, a former member of the RSPCA's ruling council: "It is terrible, terrible. There is no end to the ingenuity of man when it comes to making money and being cruel." Daniel Chen, a director of Vanny Chain Technology responded "We have not got a problem with that because what we are doing is very humane and it is for the welfare of human beings."

== Location and size ==
Nafovanny consists of two main farms in Long Thanh, Vietnam. According to the British Union for the Abolition of Vivisection (BUAV), the facility also maintains satellite breeding farms on the Cambodian border, in which the BUAV alleges wild monkeys may also be held. The existence of these farms is not referenced in the company's brochure, according to the BUAV.

The British Home Office has said it has no knowledge of Nafovanny satellite farms. However, it also said that "This decision was premised upon the contractual arrangements having been entered into in good-faith whilst Nafovanny was still considered to be an acceptable source, and animals already selected for onward supply to the UK. The view was taken that proper provision would be made for the welfare of these animals prior to their being shipped to the UK – and that this could be verified from the records and findings on arrival."

== Customers ==
The British government approved Nafovanny to export primates to British laboratories in 1999. The British Animal Scientific Procedures Inspectorate visited Nafovanny in March 2005 and identified "shortcomings in animal accommodation and care", but since then, the government has "received assurances and evidence that significant improvements have been made".

According to Viet Nam News, 3,000 Nafovanny macaques were exported to the U.S. for testing purposes in 2000. The International Primate Protection League reported that Nafovanny exported 1,440 macaques to the United States in 2013.

== See also ==
- Animal testing on non-human primates
- International trade in primates
