= Albert Belden =

English Congregational minister (1883–1964)

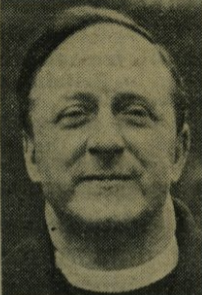
- Belden in 1934
- Born: Albert David Belden; 17 February 1883; London
- Died: 14 December 1964 (aged 81); Putney
- Occupation: Congregational minister
- Spouses: Doris Hunter Richman (m. 1909) Cecily Maud Glenister (m. 1962)

Albert David Belden (17 February 1883 – 14 December 1964) was an English Congregational minister and anti-vivisectionist.

== Career ==
Belden was born at Great Dover Street, London to William Belden and Hester Evans. He was educated at Wilson's School and trained for the Congregational ministry at New College London. He obtained his BD at London University. He was pastorate at South Bar Congregational Church in Banbury from 1908 until 1912. He became first minister of Crowstone Congregational Church, Westcliff-on-Sea in 1912 and 1927 became superintendent minister of Whitefield’s Central Mission at Tottenham Court Road.

Belden was an evangelical preacher who was inspired by George Whitefield. He authored George Whitefield: The Awakener in 1930. He preached throughout the United States and was awarded an honorary DD by Ursinus College, Pennsylvania. In 1934, he established a psychological clinic at the London University for patients and hosted weekly lectures for ministers.

He resigned from Whitefield’s Central Mission in 1939 to devote his time to activism and writing. In April 1939, Belden was the official delegate of the National Peace Council, bearing a petition with 1,062,000 names requesting American support of world-wide peace. He founded the Pax Christi League and was a member of the Fellowship of Reconciliation. In 1948, he became honorary superintendent the Pilgrim Fathers’ Memorial Church in London. He authored articles for Manchester Evening News, the Philosophical Society and was chairman of the Congregational Quarterly. He died at his home in Putney, aged 81.

== Anti-vivisection ==
Belden was an anti-vivisectionist and was a vice-president of the National Anti-Vivisection Society. He was president of the British Union for the Abolition of Vivisection. On vivisection, he commented that "our church pulpits must end their silence on this dark and evil tragedy of animal torture". He preached a sermon at the World Day for Animals held at Coventry Cathedral on 4 October 1964. He made a plea for a Christian Magna Carta for animals. Forty animal welfare organizations and 1500 people attended.

In 1953, Belden commented that "I cannot see how people can ill-treat animals for no use whatsoever... No cure for cancer has come out of experiments on thousands of animals". Belden described vivisection as "atrocious torture" and incompatible with Christianity.

== Personal life ==
Belden was a pacifist and socialist. He was a vegetarian. He married Doris Hunter Richman in 1909; they had one son. In 1962 after Richman's death, he married Cecily Maud Glenister.

== Selected publications ==
- The Dog That Spoke (1918)
- The Soul's Appeal To God (1919)
- The Religious Difficulties of Youth (1926)
- The Teachings Of The King (1926)
- George Whitefield: The Awakener (1930)
- Pax Christi: The Peace of Christ (1942)
- The Practice of Prayer (1954)
- Spiritual Healing and Vivisection (1957)
- Prison Church and Pilgrim Ship (1958)
- Pilgrims of the Impossible (1961)
