= Flowerpot technique =

Animal testing technique

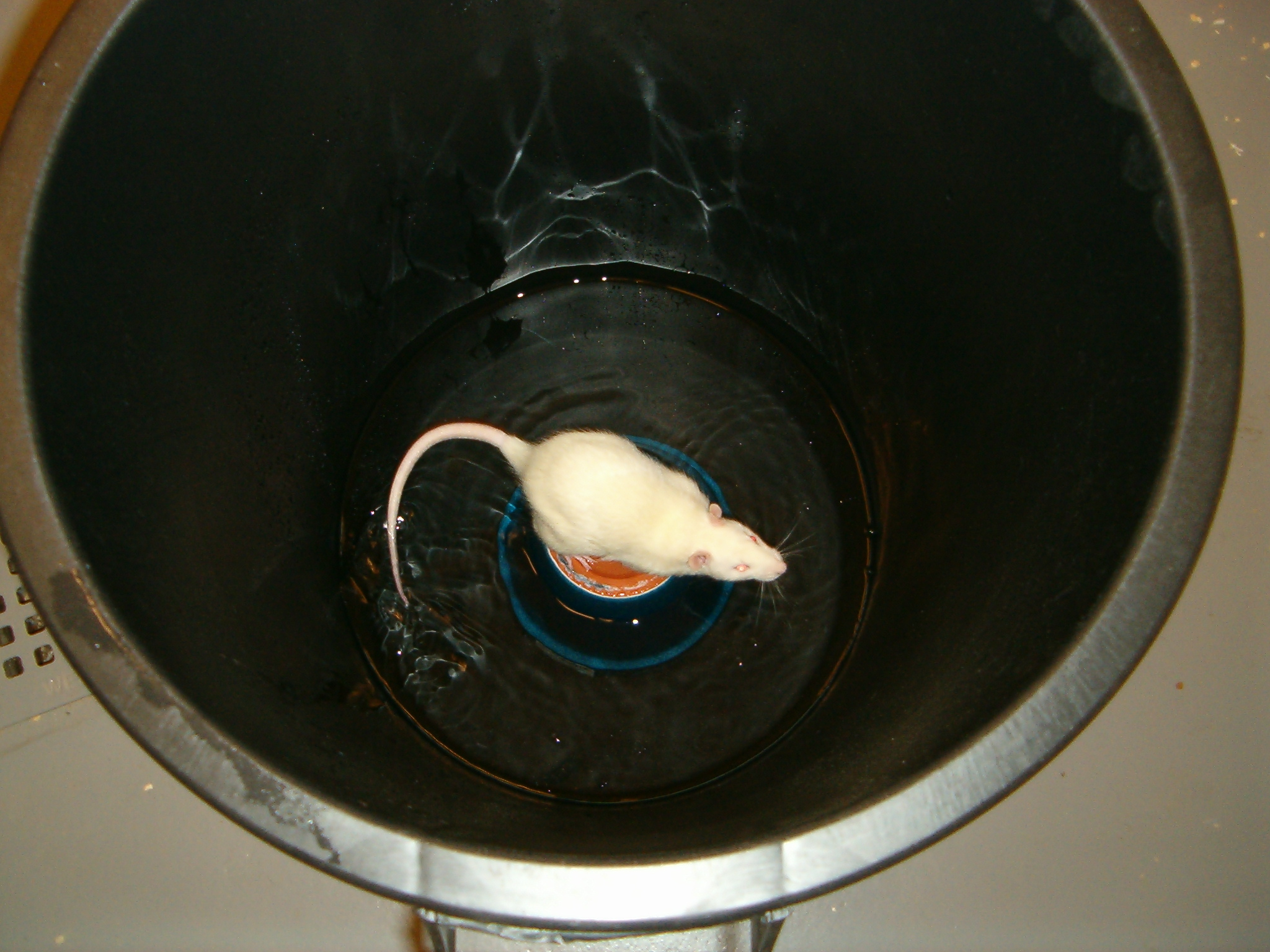
A laboratory rat undergoing the flowerpot technique

The flowerpot technique or flowerpot method is an animal testing technique used in sleep deprivation studies. It is designed to allow NREM sleep but prevent restful REM sleep. The test is usually performed with rodents.

== Technique ==
During sleep deprivation studies, a laboratory rat is housed in a water filled enclosure with a single small, dry platform (traditionally, an upside down flowerpot in a bucket of water, from which the technique is named) just above the water line (>1 cm). While in NREM sleep, the rat retains muscle tone and can sleep on top of the platform. When the rat enters the more meaningful REM sleep, it loses muscle tone and falls off the platform into the water, then climbs back up to avoid drowning, and reenters NREM sleep, or its nose becomes submerged, shocking the rat back into an awakened state. This allows the rat to physically rest to avoid fatigue, but deprives it of REM sleep needed for normal mental function. The rat can then be subjected to physical and mental tasks and its performance is compared with the performance of rested control rodents, or its tissue (particularly the brain) be analyzed.

== See also ==
- Disk-over-water method
