= Cruelty Free International =

British animal protection and advocacy group

- Founded: 14 June 1898; 128 years ago
- Founder: Frances Power Cobbe
- Founded at: Bristol, England
- Purpose: Animal testing, vivisection, animal rights
- Location: London
- Method: Education, research, lobbying, investigations, undercover work in laboratories, and lawsuits
- Key people: Michelle Thew
- Website: crueltyfreeinternational.org

Cruelty Free International is a British animal rights and advocacy group that campaigns for the abolition of all animal testing. It organises certification of cruelty-free products which are marked with the symbol of a leaping bunny.

It was founded in 1898 by Irish writer and suffragette Frances Power Cobbe as the British Union for the Abolition of Vivisection. In 2012, the BUAV joined with the New England Anti-Vivisection Society to establish a new international organisation to campaign against the testing of cosmetics on animals—Cruelty Free International. This was launched by BUAV supporter Ricky Gervais. In 2015, the parent organisation merged into this new organization, taking its name and branding for all its activities.

== Background ==
Frances Power Cobbe founded the BUAV in 1898.

The BUAV was formed in response to the National Anti-Vivisection Society (NAVS) supporting restrictive legislative proposals under Stephen Coleridge. Frances Power Cobbe did not want the Society to promote any measure short of abolition so she founded BUAV on 14 June 1898 during a public meeting in Bristol.

Known at first as the British Union, or "the Union", it campaigned against the use of dogs in vivisection, and came close to achieving success with the 1919 Dogs (Protection) Bill, which almost became law. Walter Hadwen was president and chaired meetings for BUAV. Its secretary was Beatrice E. Kidd. In 1929, BUAV had 91 branches including two in Australia. In 1949, the Worthing branch of BUAV had the largest membership in the country. President of the Worthing branch the Rev. Charles A. Hall stated that they had 1678 members and over 2000 new subscribers.

Tentative discussion toward amalgamation with the National Anti-Vivisection Society (NAVS), during the early 1960s under NAVS's Committee Secretary, Wilfred Risdon, could not be successfully concluded. During this period the president was Albert Belden. The president from 1972 to 1979 was Betty Earp.

In recent years, it successfully lobbied the British government into abolishing the oral LD_{50} test in the 1990s. The BUAV was also closely involved in the lobbying which led to the adoption in the European Union of the 7th Amendment to the Cosmetics Directive, which effectively banned both the testing of cosmetics products and their ingredients on animals and also the sale of products in the EU which have been animal-tested anywhere in the world.

== Focus ==
In recent years, the organisation has focused on a number of new areas, including the promotion of non-animal tested products; the European Union's REACH proposal to test tens of thousands of chemicals on millions of animals; and the use of non-human primates in experimentation. It acts as the secretariat of Cruelty Free Europe (CFE) and the International Council on Animal Protection in Pharmaceutical Programmes (ICAPPP), and is a member of the International Council on Animal Protection in OECD Programmes.

It helps consumers to identify and purchase products that have not been tested on animals through its Humane Cosmetics and Humane Household Products Standards (HCS and HHPS). These are audited accreditation schemes for retail companies which confirm that neither their products nor their ingredients are tested on animals. These standards are also run in a number of European countries and in the United States. A list of approved companies is available and regularly updated on their website. It also runs a primate sanctuary in Thailand for 50 rescued macaques.

== Undercover investigations ==
Undercover investigations included the exposure of the breeding and supply of monkeys from Nafovanny in Vietnam for experimentation in Europe and the US. and a contract testing laboratory in Germany operated by Fortrea. It pursued a judicial review against the Home Office as a result of its findings in the Cambridge investigation. The High Court ruled in support of the Government in three of the four issues, and in favour of the BUAV on one issue, though this was later overturned on appeal with the Home Office awarded costs. Other investigations in 2007 highlighted the primate trade from Malaysia and Spain.

== Presidents ==
1898–1904	Frances Power Cobbe
1910–1932	Walter Hadwen
1961–1964	Albert Belden
1972–1979	Betty Earp
1982	Richard Ryder

== See also ==
- Blue Cross (animal charity)
- Brown Dog affair, a political controversy about vivisection that raged in Edwardian England from 1903 until 1910.
- Cambridge University primate experiments
- List of animal rights groups
- Nafovanny
- Women and animal advocacy
