= Cambridge University primates =

Primate experiments

Cambridge University primate experiments came to public attention in 2002 after the publication that year of material from a ten-month undercover investigation in 1998 by the British Union for the Abolition of Vivisection (BUAV). The experiments were being conducted on marmosets, and included the removal of parts of their brains intended to simulate the symptoms of stroke or Parkinson's disease. Some of the research was theoretical, aimed at advancing knowledge of the brain, while some of it was applied.

BUAV said the investigation revealed examples of animal abuse indicating that animals were inadequately protected by the Animals (Scientific Procedures) Act 1986. After a review by the government's chief inspector of animals ruled against BUAV's argument that the project licences should not have been granted, BUAV applied to the High Court for a judicial review. The review ruled against BUAV on three of the four grounds, but on the remaining ground it found the Home Office had underestimated the suffering of the marmosets by categorising the experiments as "moderate," rather than "substantial." The Home Office announced a review of its procedures for categorising animal suffering.

== Nature of the research ==
A marmoset inside Cambridge University, filmed by BUAV.

As of October 2002, Cambridge University had three project licences, issued by the Home Office under the Animals (Scientific Procedures) Act 1986, permitting the controlled use of one New World non-human primate species, the common marmoset, Callithrix jacchus. The licence authorised the use of animals bred specifically for research use at breeding establishments in the UK in experiments to study brain function in relation to human disorders. According to the chief inspector of animals, the experimental protocols involved "the training and testing of animals using a range of behavioural and cognitive tasks; then disrupting normal brain function by chemical or physical lesions; the subsequent administration of experimental treatments intended to minimise the functional defects or repair the damage caused; and further testing to evaluate brain function." The animals were killed at the end of the experiments, most of them for tissue analysis.

Scientists using marmosets at Cambridge have published their work in peer reviewed journals. This includes discoveries relating to the role of the prefrontal cortex in behaviour, understanding learning and memory, modelling Parkinson's disease, and the role of the amygdala in conditioned reinforcement.

== Allegations of cruelty ==
According to the British government's inspector of animals and the British Union for the Abolition of Vivisection, in some experimental protocols, the monkeys were trained to perform certain behavioural and cognitive tasks, then were made to repeat them after minimally invasive surgery to switch off a small area of the brain, to assess how this had affected their functioning. For example, some of the monkeys suffered from a damaged arm after the experiments. They were then tethered in a way that forced them to use that arm to retrieve food or water. To encourage use of the limb, the monkeys were deprived of food or water for 22 out of every 24 hours for up to two and a half years. The monkeys were usually given an extra feed on Friday afternoons, but some researchers allegedly deprived the monkeys of this too, so that they could keep them hungry for further tests on the Monday.

During training for these tasks prior to brain surgery, BUAV claims that researchers were given instructions such as:

BUAV alleges that monkeys were left unattended for up to 15 hours after having parts of their brains removed to induce strokes, because Cambridge staff worked nine to five.

- Chase monkey into test box
- Keep "miserable" or "angry" marmosets in test apparatus
- Bang on the shutter, bang on the window
- Punish bad habits such as grooming by making a loud bang every time he does something wrong
- Lower the shutter ... if necessary onto their fingers
- Use food restrictions to make the marmosets more amenable to "shaping"

One effect of the brain damage was that the monkeys would engage in stereotypical rotating movements. BUAV reported that one test for Parkinson's disease involved shutting them in a small Perspex box for up to one hour at a time to see how often they would rotate, and injecting them with amphetamine to make them rotate faster. BUAV says the monkeys were often "clearly distressed and bewildered; they could be seen crying out, twisting frantically, retching or desperately trying to escape."

BUAV also says their investigator discovered monkeys who had had the tops of their scalps sawn off to have strokes induced, and who were then left unattended for 15 hours overnight without veterinary attention, because Cambridge staff worked nine to five. Three full-time animal care staff were employed to look after 400 animals, according to a British government review, with the research scientists themselves responsible for the welfare of animals undergoing experimental procedures.

A film produced by BUAV shows a monkey regaining muscle tone during surgery, an indication that the animal was insufficiently anaesthetised. The BUAV report suggested there was a delay of some minutes before more anaesthetic was given.

=== Response to the allegations ===
The British government's chief inspector of animals conducted a review and published a report in October 2002. It concluded the veterinary input at Cambridge was "exemplary"; the facility "seems adequately staffed"; and the animals afforded "appropriate standards of accommodation and care." The caging system was "no longer state of the art" but complied with Home Office provisions; and the marmoset colony was "generally healthy."The inspector noted four instances of non-compliance with the licence: in two experiments, the surgical procedure was at variance with the project licence; on one occasion, the water restriction schedule was at variance; on one occasion, the licence holder did not inform the department that the severity limit of an experiment had been exceeded; there were minor technical irregularities on reports of how the animals were used.

The reviewers consulted two experts in veterinary anaesthesia to investigate the consequences of a monkey regaining muscle tone during surgery. They advised that "unless purposeful or voluntary movements had accompanied the return of muscle tone then ... the anaesthetic agents should have been sufficient to block awareness of pain.

Cambridge University welcomed the report as "confirmation that there was no evidence to support the allegations made by the BUAV."

The BUAV was invited to give evidence to the inquiry, but declined. Nor did it make available the unedited video footage from its film. After publication of the report, the group said it was "utterly appalled and deeply angered by the Home Office's complete dismissal of overwhelming evidence of animal suffering" and that "the government's claim that it was correct to categorise as moderate suffering experiments where monkeys had the top of their skull sawn off and part of their brain sucked out is ludicrous in the extreme."

== Judicial review ==
As a result of the information obtained during their investigation and in light of the subsequent review, BUAV applied to the UK's High Court for permission to seek a judicial review of the legality of the Home Office's interpretation of the Cambridge case, and the wider implementation of vivisection legislation.

Mr Justice Burnton rejected four grounds for review directly related to the Cambridge case, but granted permission to seek judicial review on two wider grounds: whether death was an effect to be weighed in cost-benefit analysis and whether guidelines on restricting food and water should be a code of practice under the Animals (Scientific Procedures) Act. At the Court of Appeal, Lord Justice Keene allowed the review to proceed on two more counts that had originally been refused, on the grounds of public interest. These relate to the question of whether the Home Office underestimated the suffering of the Cambridge marmosets when setting severity limits and whether out-of-hours care and veterinary cover is required by law.

The 2007 review found in favour of the Home Office on three of the grounds. On the issue of suffering, the court found that the Home Secretary had unlawfully categorised the experiments as "moderate", rather than "substantial". The Home Office, given leave to appeal the decision, which it did successfully in April 2008 with the Home Office awarded costs.

== See also ==
- Non-human primate experiments
