= Primate experiments at Columbia University =

Primate experiments at Columbia University came to public attention in October 2003, when CNN reported that a university veterinarian had approached its Institutional Animal Care and Use Committee about experiments being carried out there on baboons.

The veterinarian complained about experiments being conducted by an assistant professor of neurology and neurosurgery, E. Sander Connolly, who was causing strokes in baboons by carefully removing their left eyeballs and using the empty eye sockets to reach a critical blood vessel to their brains, known as the internal carotid artery. A clamp temporarily was placed on this blood vessel until the stroke was induced, after which Connolly would test a potential neuroprotective drug. Connolly developed this methodology to make more consistent stroke infarcts in primates, which would improve the detection of differences in stroke treatment groups, and "provide important information not obtainable in rodent models.". Of note, a more extensive version of this operation, known as an orbitozygomatic osteotomy, is also performed in humans for treatment of certain brain tumors and vascular malformations. It does not result in blindness or permanent removal of the eye. It is done because it is deemed safer way to access the bottom portions of the brain rather than going through the brain.

In a letter to the National Institutes of Health, PETA described one experiment: "On September 19, 2001, baboon B777's left eye was removed, and a stroke was induced. The next morning, it was noted that the animal could not sit up, that he was leaning over, and that he could not eat. That evening, the baboon was still slouched over and was offered food but couldn't chew. On September 21, 2001, the record shows that the baboon was 'awake, but no movement, can't eat (chew), vomited in the a.m.' With no further notation about consulting with a veterinarian, the record reads, 'At 1:30 p.m. the animal died in the cage.'"

== Reaction ==
In a letter to PETA, neurologist Robert S. Hoffman stated that he regards such experiments to be a "blind alley," and that the baboons are "kept alive for either three or ten days after experiencing a major stroke and in a condition of profound disability. This is obviously as terrifying for animals as it is for humans unless one believes that animals are incapable of terror or other emotional distress". According to the published stroke model by Connolly, animals are given a stroke and maintained on anesthesia and analgesia for 12–18 hours. Then, when anesthesia is removed, animals that are not self-caring are euthanized. All other animals may be kept alive for three days, in accordance with established ethical guidelines. Then, if animals are not self-caring, they are euthanized. Animals that are self-caring at 72 hours may be kept alive for up to 10 days.

A USDA investigation of the Columbia baboons found "no indication that the experiments...violated federal guidelines." Further, the Dean of Research at Columbia's School of Medicine noted that Connolly stopped the experiments because of threats from animal rights activists, despite the fact that Connolly "remained convinced that his experiments were humane and potentially valuable."
