= Humanized mouse =

Mouse carrying functioning human genes, cells, etc.

A humanized mouse is a genetically modified mouse that has functioning human genes, cells, tissues and/or organs. Humanized mice are commonly used as small animal models in biological and medical research for human therapeutics.

A humanized mouse or a humanized mouse model is one that has been xenotransplanted with human cells and/or engineered to express human gene products, so as to be utilized for gaining relevant insights in the in vivo context for understanding of human-specific physiology and pathologies. Several human biological processes have been explored using animal models like rodents and non-human primates. In particular, small animals such as mice are advantageous in such studies owing to their small size, brief reproductive cycle, easy handling and due to the genomic and physiological similarities with humans; moreover, these animals can also be genetically modified easily. Nevertheless, there are several incongruencies of these animal systems with those of humans, especially with regard to the components of the immune system. To overcome these limitations and to realize the full potential of animal models to enable researchers to get a clear picture of the nature and pathogenesis of immune responses mounted against human-specific pathogens, humanized mouse models have been developed. Such mouse models have also become an integral aspect of preclinical biomedical research.

== History ==
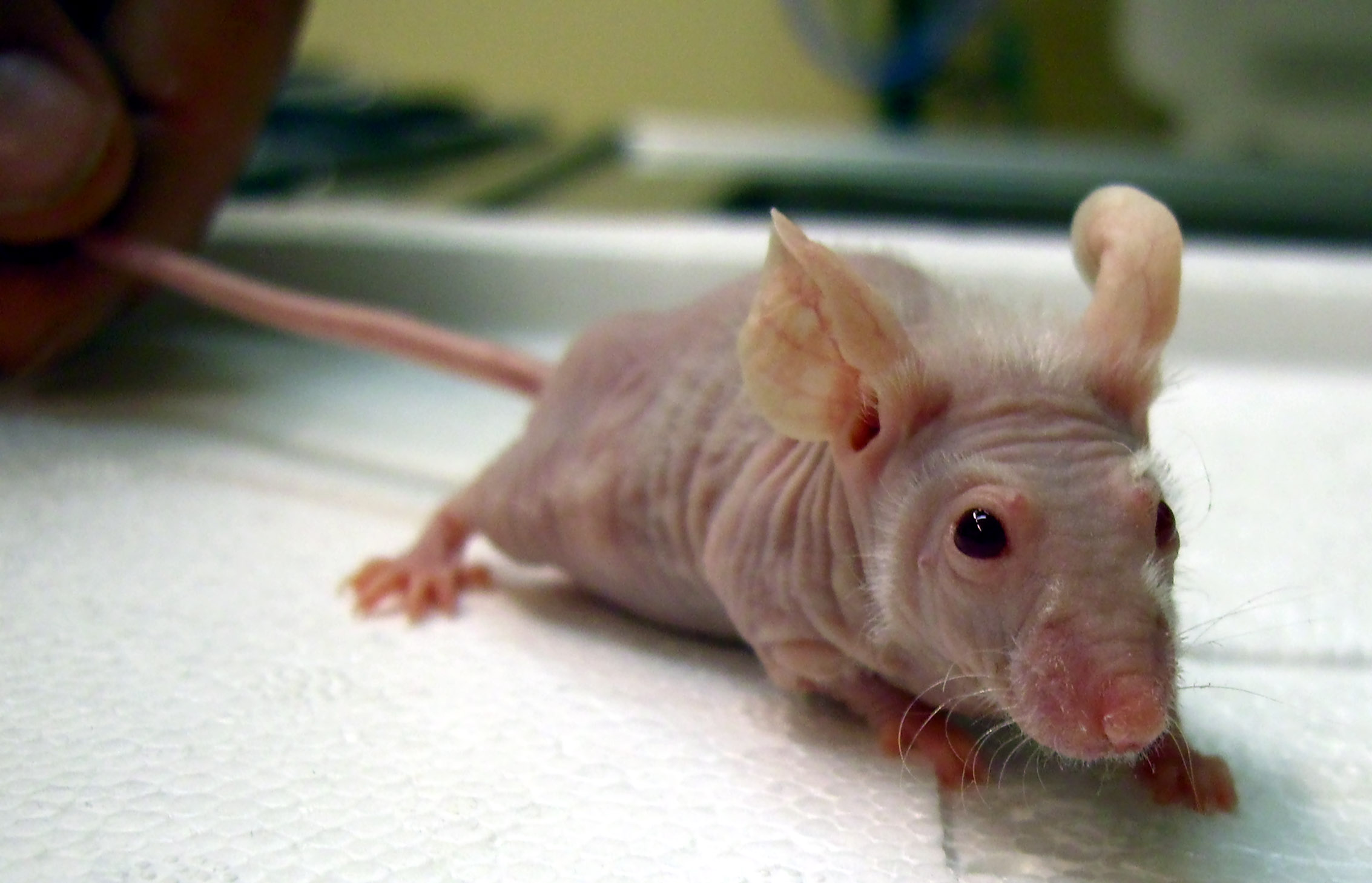
The athymic nude mouse: the pioneering immunodeficient model that paved the way for humanized mouse research.

The discovery of the athymic mouse, commonly known as the nude mouse, and that of the SCID mouse were major events that paved the way for humanized mice models. The first such mouse model was derived by backcrossing C57BL/Ka and BALB/c mice, featuring a loss of function mutation in the PRKDC gene. The PRKDC gene product is necessary for resolving breaks in DNA strands during the development of T cells and B cells. A mutation in the Foxn1 gene on chromosome 11 resulted in impaired thymus development, leading to a deficiency in mature T lymphocytes. Dysfunctional PRKDC gene leads to impaired development of T and B lymphocytes, which gives rise to severe combined immunodeficiency (SCID). In spite of the efforts in developing this mouse model, poor engraftment of human hematopoietic stem cells (HSCs) was a major limitation that called for further advancement in the development of humanized mouse models. Nude mice were the earliest immunodeficient mouse model. These mice primarily produced IgM and had minimal or no IgA. As a result, they did not exhibit a rejection response to allogeneic tissue. Commonly utilized strains included BALB/c-nu, Swiss-nu, NC-nu, and NIH-nu, which were extensively employed in the research of immune diseases and tumors. However, due to the retention of B cells and NK cells, they were unable to fully support engraftment of human immune cells, thus making them unsuitable as an ideal humanized mouse model.

The next big step in the development of humanized mice models came with transfer of the scid mutation to a non-obese diabetic mouse. This resulted in the creation of the NOD-scid mice which lacked T cells, B cells, and NK cells. This mouse model permitted for a slightly higher level of human cell reconstitution. Nevertheless, a major breakthrough in this field came with the introduction of the mutant IL-2 receptor (IL2rg) gene in the NOD-scid model. This accounted for the creation of the NOD-scid-γcnull mice (NCG, NSG or NOG) models which were found to have defective signaling of interleukins IL-2, IL-4, IL-7, IL-9, IL-15 and IL-21. Researchers evolved this NSG model by knocking out the RAG1 and RAG2 genes (recombination activation genes), resulting into the RAG^{null} version of the NSG model that was devoid of major cells of the immune system including the natural killer cells, B lymphocytes and T lymphocytes, macrophages and dendritic cells, causing the greatest immunodeficiency in mice models so far. The limitation with this model was that it lacked the human leukocyte antigen. In accordance to this limitation, the human T cells when engrafted in the mice, failed to recognize human antigen-presenting cells, which consequated in defective immunoglobulin class switching and improper organization of the secondary lymphoid tissue.

To circumvent this limitation, the next development came with the introduction of transgenes encoding for HLA I and HLA II in the NSG RAG^{null} model that enabled buildout of human T-lymphocyte repertoires as well as the respective immune responses. Mice with such human genes are technically human-animal hybrids.

== Types ==
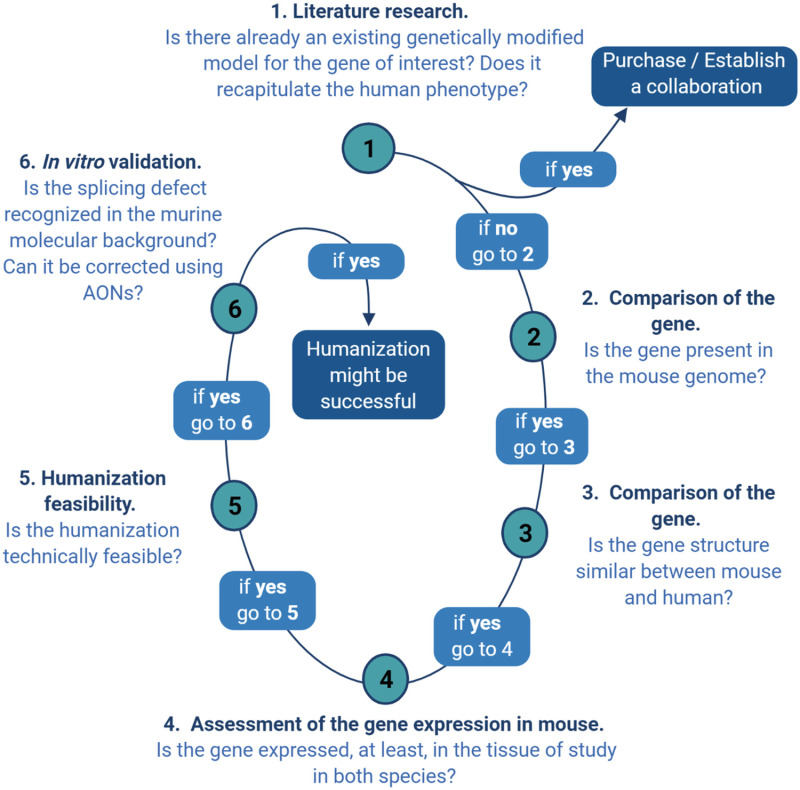
Schematic representation of the checkpoints for generating a humanized mouse model.

Engrafting an immunodeficient mouse with functional human cells can be achieved by intravenous injections of human cells and tissue into the mouse, and/or creating a genetically modified mouse from human genes. These models have been instrumental in studying human diseases, immune responses, and therapeutic interventions. This section highlights the various humanized mice models developed using the different methods.

=== Hu-PBL-scid model ===
The human peripheral blood lymphocyte-severe combined immunodeficiency mouse model has been employed in a diverse array of research, encompassing investigations into Epstein-Barr virus (EBV)-associated lymphoproliferative disease, toxoplasmosis, human immunodeficiency virus (HIV) infection, and autoimmune diseases. These studies have highlighted the effectiveness of the hu-PBL-SCID mouse model in examining various facets of human diseases, including pathogenesis, immune responses, and therapeutic interventions. Furthermore, the model has been utilized to explore genetic and molecular factors linked to neuropsychiatric disorders such as schizophrenia, offering valuable insights into the pathophysiology and potential therapeutic targets for these conditions. This model is developed by intravenously injecting human PBMCs into immunodeficient mice. The peripheral blood mononuclear cells to be engrafted into the model are obtained from consented adult donors. The advantages associated with this method are that it is comparatively an easy technique, the model takes relatively less time to get established and that the model exhibits functional memory T cells. It is particularly very effective for modelling graft vs. host disease. The model lacks engraftment of B lymphocytes and myeloid cells. Other limitations with this model are that it is suitable for use only in short-term experiments (<3 months) and the possibility that the model itself might develop graft vs. host disease.

=== Hu-SRC-scid model ===
The humanized severe combined immunodeficiency (SCID) mouse model, also known as the hu-SRC-scid model, has been extensively utilized in various research areas, including immunology, infectious diseases, cancer, and drug development. This model has been instrumental in studying the human immune response to xenogeneic and allogeneic decellularized biomaterials, providing valuable insights into the biocompatibility and gene expression regulation of these materials. Hu-SRC-scid mice are developed by engrafting CD34+ human hematopoietic stem cells into immunodeficient mice. The cells are obtained from human fetal liver, bone marrow or from blood derived from the umbilical cord, and engrafted via intravenous injection. The advantages of this model are that it offers multilineage development of hematopoietic cells, generation of a naïve immune system, and if engraftment is carried out by intrahepatic injection of newborn mice within 72 hours of birth, it can lead to enhanced human cell reconstitution. Nevertheless, limitations associated with the model are that it takes a minimum of 10 weeks for cell differentiation to occur, it harbors low levels of human RBCs, polymorphonuclear leukocytes, and megakaryocytes.

=== BLT (bone marrow/liver/thymus) model ===
The BLT model is constituted with human HSCs, bone marrow, liver, and thymus. The engraftment is carried out by implantation of liver and thymus under the kidney capsule and by transplantation of HSCs obtained from fetal liver. The BLT model has a complete and totally functional human immune system with HLA-restricted T lymphocytes. The model also comprises a mucosal system that is similar to that of humans. Moreover, among all models the BLT model has the highest level of human cell reconstitution.

However, since it requires surgical implantation, this model is the most difficult and time-consuming to develop. Other drawbacks associated with the model are that it portrays weak immune responses to xenobiotics, sub-optimal class switching and may develop GvHD.

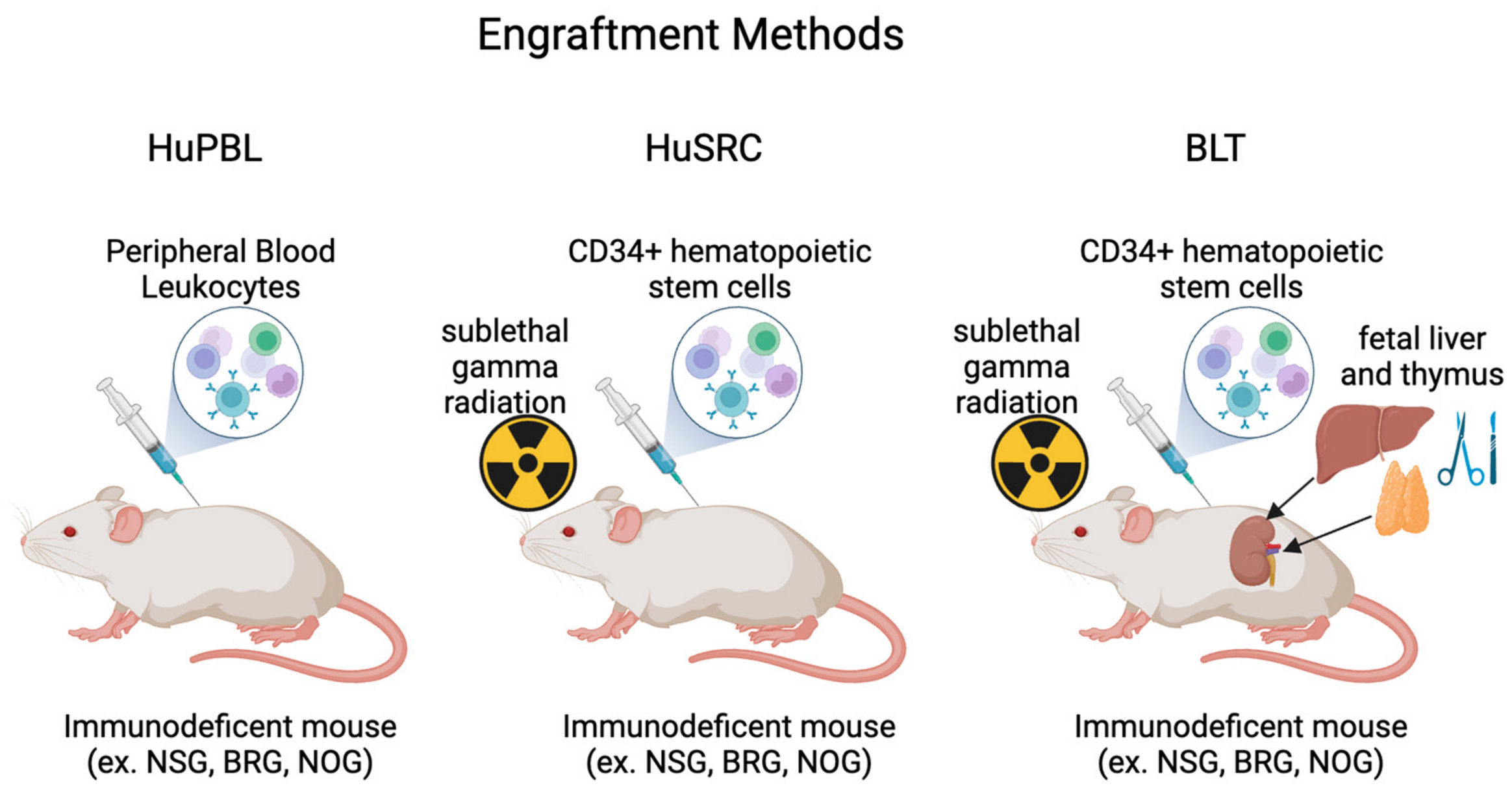
Schematic representation of engraftment methods (HuPBL, HuSRC, and BLT) used to generate humanized mice.

== Transplanted human organoids ==
Bio- and electrical engineers have shown that human cerebral organoids transplanted into mice functionally integrate with their visual cortex. Such models may raise similar ethical issues as organoid-based humanization of other animals.

=== Mouse-human hybrid ===
A mouse-human hybrid is a genetically modified mouse whose genome has both mouse and human genes, thus being a murine form of a human-animal hybrid. For example, genetically modified mice may be born with human leukocyte antigen genes in order to provide a more realistic environment when introducing human white blood cells into them in order to study immune system responses. One such application is the identification of hepatitis C virus (HCV) peptides that bind to HLA, and that can be recognized by the human immune system, thereby potentially being targets for future vaccines against HCV.

== Established models for human diseases ==
Several mechanisms underlying human maladies are not fully understood. Utilization of humanized mice models in this context allows researchers to determine and unravel important factors that bring about the development of several human diseases and disorders falling under the categories of infectious disease, cancer, autoimmunity, and GvHD.

=== Infectious diseases ===
Among the human-specific infectious pathogens studied on humanized mice models, the human immunodeficiency virus has been successfully studied. Besides this, humanized models for studying Ebola virus, Hepatitis B, Hepatitis C, Kaposi's sarcoma-associated herpesvirus, Leishmania major, malaria, and tuberculosis have been reported by various studies.

NOD/scid mice models for dengue virus and varicella-zoster virus, and a Rag2^{null}𝛾c^{null} model for studying influenza virus have also been developed.

=== Cancers ===
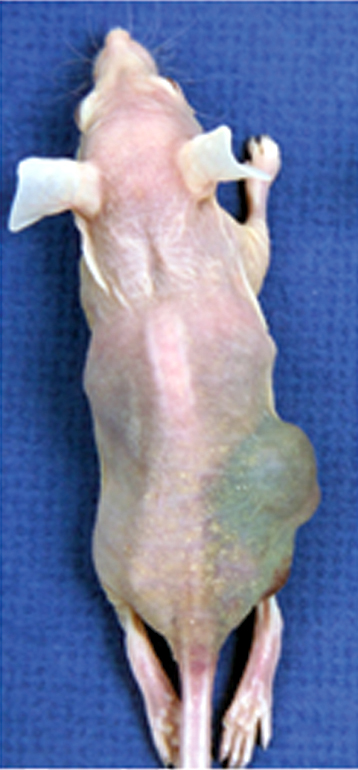
Xenograft of a prostate cancer cell line (LNCaP) into an immunodeficient mouse.

On the basis of the type of human cells/tissues that have been used for engraftment, humanized mouse models for cancer can be classified as patient-derived xenografts or cell line-derived xenografts. PDX models are considered to retain the parental malignancy characteristics at a greater extent and hence these are regarded as the more powerful tool for evaluating the effect of anticancer drugs in pre-clinical studies. Humanized mouse models for studying cancers of various organs have been designed. A mouse model for the study of breast cancer has been generated by the intrahepatic engraftment of SK-BR-3 cells in NSG mice. Similarly, NSG mice intravenously engrafted with patient-derived AML cells, and those engrafted (via subcutaneous, intravenous or intra-pancreatic injections) with patient-derived pancreatic cancer tumors have also been developed for the study of leukemia and pancreatic cancer respectively. Several other humanized rodent models for the study of cancer and cancer immunotherapy have also been reported.

=== Autoimmune diseases ===
Problems posed by the differences in the human and rodent immune systems have been overcome using a few strategies, so as to enable researchers to study autoimmune disorders using humanized models. As a result, the use of humanized mouse models has extended to various areas of immunology and disease research. For instance, humanized mice have been utilized to study human-tropic pathogens, liver cancer models, and the comparison of mouse models to human diseases NSG mice engrafted with PBMCs and administered with myelin antigens in Freund's adjuvant, and antigen-pulsed autologous dendritic cells have been used to study multiple sclerosis. Similarly, NSG mice engrafted with hematopoietic stem cells and administered with pristane have been used for studying lupus erythematosus. Furthermore, NOG mice engrafted with PBMCs has been used to study mechanisms of allografts rejection in vivo. The development of humanized mouse models has significantly advanced the study of autoimmune disorders and various areas of immunology and disease research. These models have provided a platform for investigating human diseases, immune responses, and therapeutic interventions, bridging the gap between human and rodent immune systems and offering valuable insights into disease pathogenesis and potential therapeutic strategies.

== Limitations ==
Humanized mice present several important limitations that affect their translational value. The reconstitution of the human immune system remains incomplete, particularly for myeloid lineages and fully functional adaptive immune responses, leading to an underrepresentation of key human immune mechanisms. In addition, the murine microenvironment does not fully support human immune cell development, as species-specific differences in cytokine signaling and cellular interactions can alter immune cell maturation and function. Another major limitation is the frequent development of graft-versus-host disease (GVHD), especially in PBMC-based models, which induces systemic inflammation and significantly restricts the duration of experiments, limiting long-term studies. Moreover, these models are costly and technically demanding to establish, requiring specialized procedures such as irradiation, stem cell engraftment, and strict animal facility conditions, which limits their accessibility and scalability. Finally, donor-dependent variability introduces inconsistencies between experiments, reducing reproducibility and complicating the interpretation of results in preclinical studies.

== See also ==
- Nude mouse
- SCID mouse
- NOG mouse
- NSG mouse
- Mouse model of colorectal and intestinal cancer
- Mouse models of breast cancer metastasis
- Knockout mouse
