= Mouse Models of Human Cancer database =

Database of mouse models of human cancer

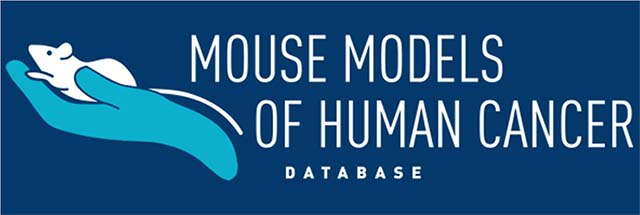

Content
- Description: Resource for information on mouse models of human cancer.
- Data types captured: Mouse models, genetics, genomics, tumor pathology images.
- Organisms: Mus musculus, Homo sapiens

Contact
- Research center: The Jackson Laboratory
- Primary citation: Krupke et al. (2017) PMID 29092943

Access
- Website: http://www.tumor.informatics.jax.org/

The laboratory mouse has been instrumental in investigating the genetics of human disease, including cancer, for over 110 years. The laboratory mouse has physiology and genetic characteristics very similar to humans providing powerful models for investigation of the genetic characteristics of disease.

The Mouse Models of Human Cancer database (MMHCdb) is a unique, comprehensive online knowledgebase of mouse models of human cancer hosted by The Jackson Laboratory with funding from the National Cancer Institute (NCI). MMHCdb is part of the Mouse Genome Informatics consortium (MGI) and was first released in 1998 as the Mouse Tumor Biology (MTB) database. MMHCdb contains genetic and genomic information about inbred mouse strains, genetically engineered mouse models (GEMMs) and Patient Derived Xenograft (PDX) models of human cancer. Data in MMHCdb is expertly curated from peer-reviewed scientific publications or obtained as direct data submissions from individual investigators and large-scale research initiatives. MMHCdb, in collaboration with EMBL-EBI, co-developed the PDCM Finder resource which serves as a global catalog of PDX models.

== Inbred Mouse Models ==
Inbred mouse strains are the result of at least 20 generations of successive brother/sister matings which lead to a population with minimal segregating genetic variation. Inbred strains of mice allow researchers to investigate the role that genetics plays in cancer susceptibility and treatment response. The first inbred strain, DBA (dilute brown agouti), was developed in 1909. Among the earliest references to the use of inbred mice in cancer was the observed susceptibility of the A family of inbred mice to spontaneous lung tumors. MMHCdb provides interactive graphical summaries of the characteristic cancers observed in over 700 different inbred mouse strains. Figure 1 shows one of these tools, the Tumor Frequency Grid, which displays the frequency of different types of tumors across different inbred strains.

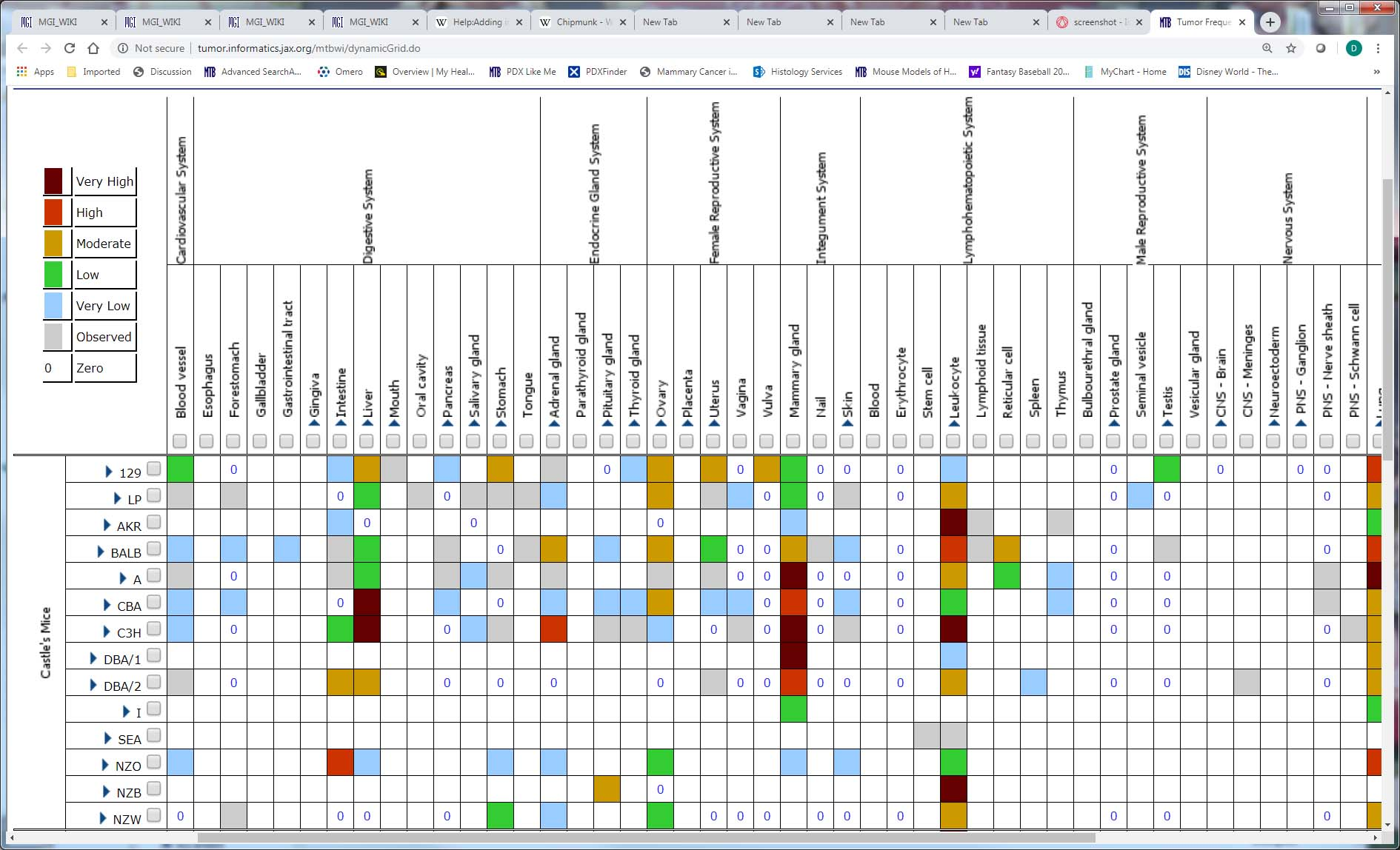
Fig. 1. Dynamic Tumor Frequency Grid.

== Genetically Engineered Mouse Models (GEMMs) ==
Molecular biology and genome editing technologies transformed the use of mice in cancer research by allowing researchers to develop animal models with specific mutations or that expressed human genes (transgenics). The genetic background of genetically modified animals can influence the observed phenotypes and must be taken into account when mouse models of human cancer are developed and when interpreting the data generated by these models. For example, transgenic mice on a mixed C57BL/6J and SJL background expressing human HRAS have a mammary gland carcinoma frequency of 45-50% whereas the same transgene expressed in FVB/N mice result in 100% of the animals having mammary gland carcinomas. MMHCdb provides search tools and displays to show the tumor frequencies of similar genetic modifications on different genetic backgrounds. Fig.2 shows the results of a search for lung adenocarcinomas with pathology images using the Advanced Search page and links to the results of that search.

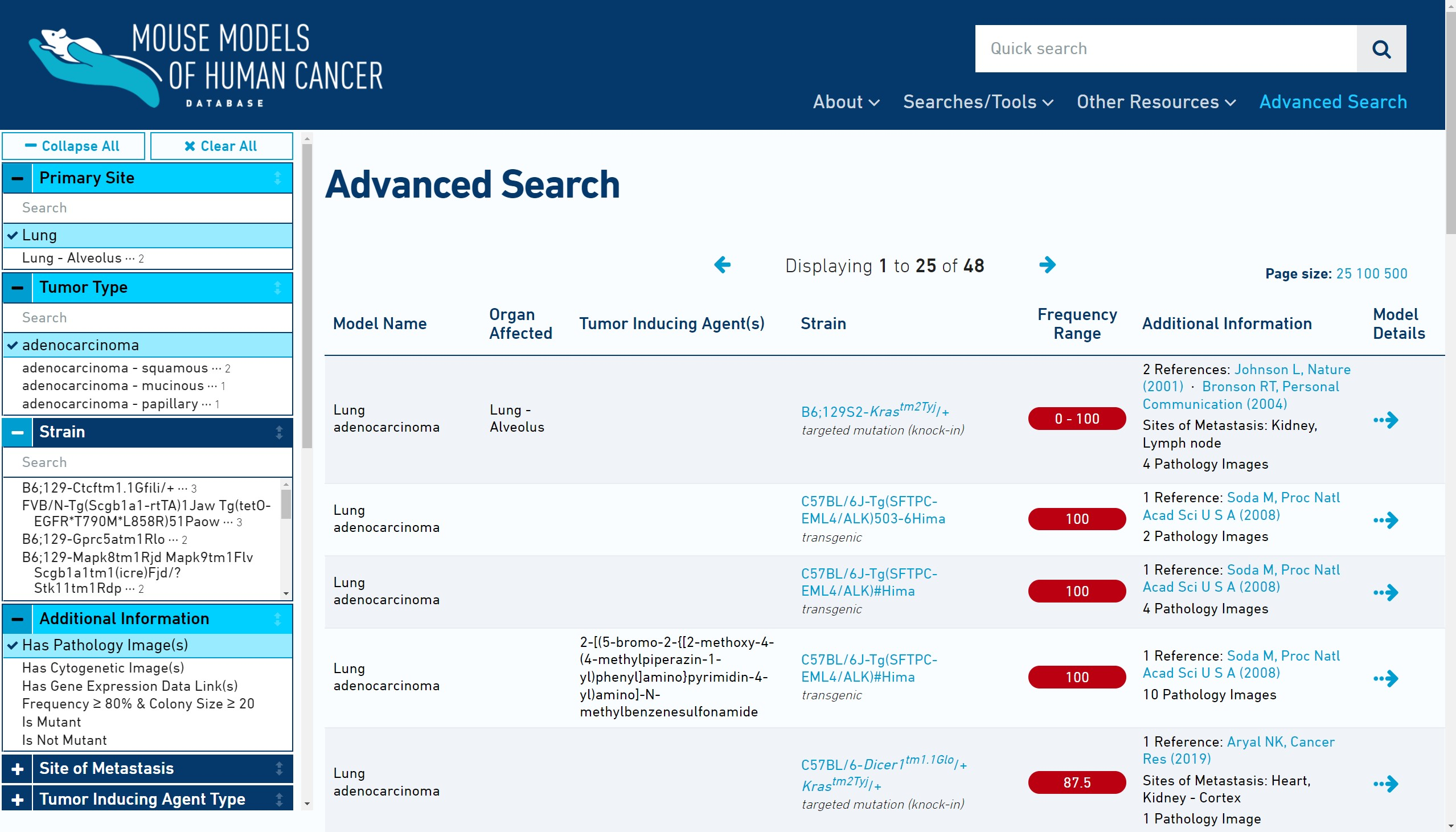
Fig. 2. Advanced Search example.

== Patient Derived Xenograft models (PDX) ==
A Patient Derived Xenograft (PDX) is generated by the implantation of human tumor tissue in an immunodeficient or humanized host mouse strain. PDXs are a powerful pre-clinical model system for evaluating efficacy of cancer therapy. Most of the PDX models in MMHCdb are from xenografts in the immunodeficient NSG host strain (aka, NOD scid gamma; NOD.Cg-Prkdc<scid> Il2rg<tm1>Wjl/SzJ) mice developed at The Jackson Laboratory. MMHCdb allows researchers to search for PDX models by such parameters as cancer site, diagnosis, genomic properties of the engrafted human tumor, and model treatment response. Fig. 3 shows the output of a search for PDX models whose engrafted tumors have amplified KRAS, the TP53 A159V mutation, a deletion of the ALB gene, and high KIT expression.

MMHCdb and EMBL-EBI co-developed PDCM Finder, an searchable catalog of PDX models available from repositories around the world.

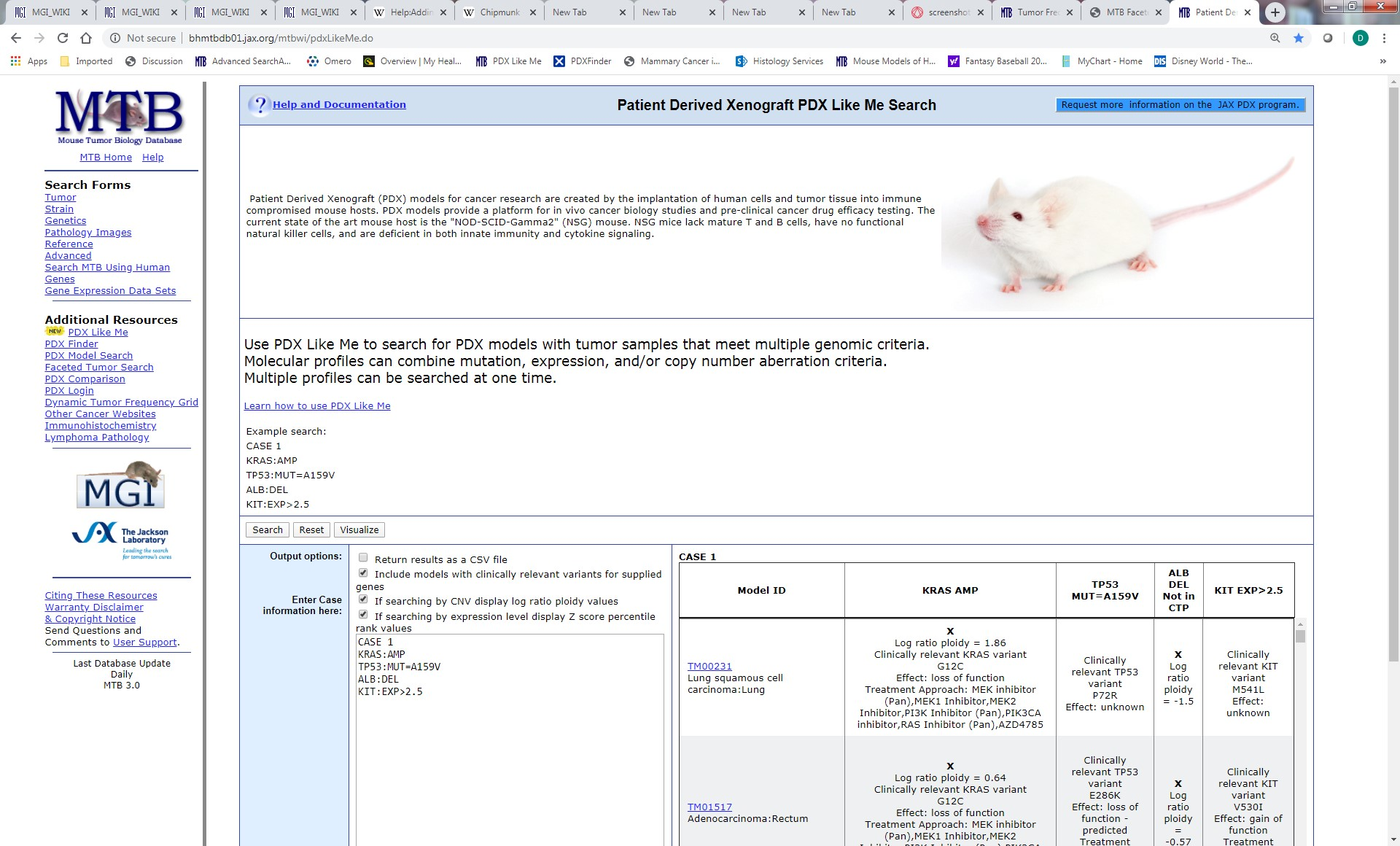
Fig. 3. PDX Like Me search example.

== Database content ==
The MMHCdb contains a large amount of varied, highly detailed data and is continually adding new data and data types. This section contains a summary of the content in MMHCdb as of February 2020;

Data Type	Content
Data Sources	26303
Inbred strains	728
GEMMs	6326
PDX Models (PDCM Finder)	>7000
Models (strain + tumor type)	>60000
Pathology Images	>6600

== See also ==
- The Jackson Laboratory
- Mouse Genome Informatics
- National Cancer Institute
- American Association for Cancer Research
- Mouse Models of Human Cancer database YouTube channel
