= NOG =

NOG or Nog may refer to:

- Antônio Rodrigo Nogueira, Mixed martial arts fighter, also known as "Big Nog"
- Antônio Rogério Nogueira, Mixed martial arts fighter, also known as "Little Nog"
- Nog (Star Trek), fictional character, a young Ferengi in Star Trek: Deep Space Nine
- Noggin (protein), also known as NOG, a human protein
- N-Oxalylglycine, an organic compound
- Internet network operators' groups (NOGs), informal groups which provide forums for Internet network operators
- NOG, IATA code for Nogales International Airport (Mexico), Nogales, Sonora
- NOG, FAA location identifier for Naval Auxiliary Landing Field Orange Grove, a military airport southwest of Orange Grove, Texas
- nog, slang for eggnog
- Nogs, a people in Noggin the Nog, a popular British children's television series
- Nog (novel), by Rudolph Wurlitzer
- Brick nog, bricks filled in-between wooden framing
- A horizontal framing member in a wall or floor also called a nogging piece or dwang
- Nogai (ISO 639-2 nog), a Turkic language of the North Caucasus
- North Geelong railway station, Australia

== See also ==
- NOG mouse, a variety of mice used in medical research
