= International Council for Laboratory Animal Science =

International non-profit organization

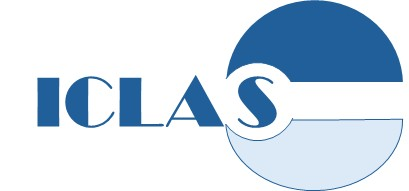
- Abbreviation: ICLAS
- Founded: 1956; 70 years ago
- Founders: United Nations Educational Scientific and Cultural Organization (UNESCO); International Union of Biological Sciences (IUBS); Council for International Organizations of Medical Sciences (CIOMS)
- Type: International non-profit organization
- Staff: All-volunteer organization
- Website: iclas.org
- Formerly called: International Committee on Laboratory Animals (ICLA)

The International Council for Laboratory Animal Science (ICLAS) is an international non-profit organization dedicated to the worldwide promotion of ethical principles, scientific responsibilities, and welfare in the use of laboratory animals for research and education.

ICLAS was originally established as the International Committee on Laboratory Animals (ICLA) in 1956. Its activities focus on:

- education and training for those working with laboratory animals,
- harmonisation of guidelines on the care and use of laboratory animals,
- the enhancement of laboratory animal quality,
- promotion of the continuing development of laboratory animal science (LAS) worldwide through its regional committees and scientific meetings.

== Governance ==
ICLAS's policy-making body is its Governing Board (GB), which consists of volunteer representatives of National, Scientific, Union and Institutional ICLAS members who are elected every four years at the ICLAS General Assembly.

== Funding ==
ICLAS's funds come mainly from annual ICLAS member fees, which vary according to the size of the organization and membership category. Other income sources are periodic donations and sponsorships, particularly for ICLAS training programs, from companies, organizations and foundations operating in the field of laboratory animal science (LAS).

== Members ==
As of January 2026, ICLAS had 81 members worldwide:

=== National members ===
==== Africa ====
- Tunisia

==== America ====
- Brazil
- Canada
- Cuba
- USA

==== Asia ====
- India
- Iran
- Japan
- South Korea
- Thailand

==== Europe ====
- Austria
- Finland
- Germany
- Hungary
- Ireland
- Italy
- Poland
- Spain
- Sweden

==== Oceania ====
- Australia
- New Zealand

=== Scientific members ===
==== Africa ====
- Algerian Association of Experimental Animal Sciences (AASEA)
- Animal Care and Use in Research, Education and Training (ACURET)
- South African Association for Laboratory Animal Science (SAALAS)

==== America ====
- American Association for Accreditation of Laboratory Animal Care (AAALAC)
- American Association for Laboratory Animal Science (AALAS)
- American College of Laboratory Animal Medicine (ACLAM)
- Argentine Association of Laboratory Animal Science and Technology (AACyTAL)
- Chilean Association of Laboratory Animal Science and Technology (ASOCHITAL)
- Colombian Association for the Science and Welfare of Laboratory Animals (ACCBA)
- Uruguayan Association of Laboratory Animal Science and Technology (AUCYTAL)
- Federation of Hispanic Associations and Societies of North America, Central America and the Caribbean for Laboratory Animal Science (FESAHANCCCAL)
- Peruvian Association for Animal Use and Welfare in Research and Teaching (ASOPEBAID)
- Association for Laboratory Animal Science of Guatemala (ACAL)
- Canadian Association for Laboratory Animal Science (CALAS/ACSAL)

==== Asia ====
- Chinese - Taipei Society of Laboratory Animal Sciences (CSLAS)
- Sri Lanka Association for Laboratory Animal Science (SLALAS)
- Philippine Association for Laboratory Animal Science (PALAS)
- India: Laboratory Animal Scientists' Association India (LASA India)
- Thai Association for Laboratory Animal Science (TALAS)
- Laboratory Animal Science Association of Malaysia (LASAM)
- Japanese Association for Laboratory Animal Science (JALAS)
- Korean Association for Laboratory Animal Science (KALAS)
- Association of Primate Veterinarians (APV)
- Laboratory Animal Resource Centre, Korea (LARRC/KRIBB)

==== Europe ====
- French Association of Laboratory Animal Sciences and Techniques (AFSTAL)
- Italian Association of Laboratory Animal Science (AISAL)
- Portuguese Society of Laboratory Animal Science (SPCA)
- Finnish Laboratory Animal Science Association (FinLAS)
- Georgian Association for Laboratory Animal Science (GALAS)
- German Society for Laboratory Animal Science (GV-SOLAS)
- Laboratory Animal Science Association (UK) (LASA)
- Russian Laboratory Animal Science Association (Rus-LASA)

==== Oceania ====
- Australia and New Zealand Laboratory Animal Association

=== Associate members ===
- GlaxoSmithKline
- Virtual Bioterio
- Cerberus Sciences
- Charles River Laboratories
- CHUGAI Pharmaceutical Co
- Tecniplast

=== Union members ===
- International Union of Physiological Sciences
- International Union of Basic and Clinical Pharmacology
- International Union of Immunological Societies

=== Institutional members ===
==== Australia ====
- COMPATH:South Australian Health and Medical Research Institute
- South Australia's flagship not-for-profit health and medical research institute

==== Brazil ====
- The Reproductive Biology Center (CBR) of the Federal University of Juiz de Fora (UFJF)
- Network of Animal Facilities, Federal University of Uberlândia

==== China ====
- Centre for Comparative Medicine Research-The University of Hong Kong
- GemPharmatech
- Guangdong Provincial Biotechnology Research Institute
- National Institutes for Food and Drug Control (NIFDC)

==== Colombia ====
- University of the Andes (Colombia)

==== Egypt ====
- Alexandria University
- Cairo University

==== India ====
- Advanced Centre for Treatment, Research and Education in Cancer
- Syngene International Limited

==== Japan ====
- Central Institute for Experimental Animals

==== Spain ====
- Integrated Laboratory Animal Services, Autonomous University of Barcelona (SIAL)

=== Affiliates ===
- Asian Federation of Laboratory Animal Science Associations
- Federation of South American Societies for Laboratory Animal Science
- Federation of European Laboratory Animal Science Associations (FELASA)

== History ==
=== Growth in the number of animals used in research ===
Following the publication of Charles Darwin's "On the Origin of Species" in 1859, and Claude Bernard's book on vivisection in 1865, by the late 19th century, animal research had become the predominant method of laboratory investigation. The early 20th century saw an expansion of laboratory animal use in vaccine development. In 1908, the poliovirus was identified as the cause of polio, and in the 1930s, mass vaccination campaigns using diphtheria toxoid began in several countries. Animals were also used extensively in the development of drugs, notably Frederick Banting's revolutionary treatment of diabetes using insulin isolated from dogs in 1921, and Alexander Fleming's discovery of penicillin in 1928, which led to extensive testing on mice. This period was also marked by an explosion of new synthetic chemistry, which necessitated large-scale pharmacological testing using animals as human surrogates.

While reliable global statistics on laboratory animal use are scarce due to the absence of systematic record-keeping, it is estimated that in the UK alone, the number of animals used for research rose from a few thousand in the 1900s to more than 2 million by 1950.

=== Issues with animal quality ===
Alongside the increased demand for laboratory animals came an urgent need to ensure their quality. The research community required not only more animals but also high-quality animals, i.e., animals free from any disease or condition that might interfere with procedures and give misleading results.

In the early 1950s, laboratory animals were obtained from random stocks and assorted breeders and were rarely purpose-bred. Although some countries had implemented quality standards, they had not gained ground to the same degree everywhere. As a result, there were large national and regional differences in laboratory animal quality, especially in developing countries.

=== Creation of ICLA ===
By 1955, the United Nations Educational Scientific and Cultural Organization (UNESCO), together with the International Union of Biological Sciences (IUBS), and the Council for International Organizations of Medical Sciences (CIOMS) had come to realize that unless steps were taken to address these disparities, vital progress in experimental biology and medicine would be delayed or hindered.

To this end, in 1956, these three organisations co-founded the International Committee on Laboratory Animals (ICLA) with the aim of increasing the supply of high-quality laboratory animals worldwide. In 1979, the committee was renamed the International Council for Laboratory Animal Science (ICLAS).

== ICLA's activities and achievements 1956–1979 ==
=== Scientific symposiums ===
In the early years, ICLA focused on conducting surveys to determine the use of laboratory animals and their associated problems in different countries. These surveys indicated that a large number of scientific and technical problems lay unsolved within the field of laboratory animal science (LAS). Consequently, in 1958, ICLA held its first international scientific symposium on "Animal Material for Biological Research", with the aim of bringing together experts to discuss best practices in relation to LAS.

=== Specialized training ===
Another priority was the need for specialized training for animal technicians in LAS, particularly in genetics, nutrition and pathology. Accordingly, in 1963, ICLA began to offer scholarships for a week's special training in LAS in an advanced center. In later years, scholarships were awarded to enable young scientists to attend local, regional or international congresses as a way of stimulating career interest and improving the exchange of information on laboratory animal science.

=== Standardizing nomenclature ===
In the 1970s, ICLA began to address the need for standardization of definitions of terms used in laboratory animal procedures. Many scientific papers were not consistent in the terminology used to describe the animals, husbandry and techniques used in their research procedures, which was affecting the credibility of the research. This led, in 1971, to the first ICLA publication on recommended international nomenclature for outbred stocks of laboratory animals, intended for use by breeders, users, researchers and editors of scientific journals. Further work on nomenclature took place in 1993, when ICLAS published a standardized genetic nomenclature for rats.

=== Reference and monitoring centers ===
Another factor affecting the credibility of research was variation in research techniques and control systems. To address these discrepancies, in 1971, ICLA established a Reference Center Program, whereby certain research organizations were designated as authorized research centers with approved techniques and control systems for particular lines of research. The first of these were ICLA Virus Reference Centers for Rodents, followed in 1973 by histocompatibility reference centers for mice, and in 1976 by reference centers for histocompatibility testing of anuran amphibians, guinea pigs and mice. Similarly, in 1980, ICLAS established its first Genetic Monitoring Center at the Central Institute for Experimental Animals (CIEA) in Japan.

=== Change of name to ICLAS ===
During the 1970s, new knowledge in biology and medicine requiring planned experiments with animals led to the emergence of laboratory animal science as a discipline in its own right. As a result, in 1979, ICLA changed its name to the International Council for Laboratory Animal Science (ICLAS) to reflect the organization's primary aim of promoting animal science.

== ICLAS activities and achievements, 1980–1999 ==
=== Transport of laboratory animals ===
Involvement in this issue started in 1972, when ICLA began lobbying the International Air Transport Association (IATA) to improve transport conditions for animals. In 1983, ICLAS made a number of proposals to IATA to improve the transport of animals used for research and testing purposes. These proposals were well accepted and incorporated into the 13th edition of the "IATA Live Animals Regulations" published in 1986.

=== Legislation and ethics ===
Work on legislation and ethics also started in the 1970s, when the Council of Europe (CE) began drafting a document on regulations for the protection of vertebrate animals used for experimental purposes. ICLA considered this document too restrictive and a real threat to research, and in 1974, created its own set of guidelines "Guidelines for Regulation of Animal Experimentation", which it urged the CE to adopt. After several years of meetings with European Commission (EC) committees, a new version of the CE's draft document containing most of ICLAS's recommendations, entitled "European Convention for the Protection of Vertebrate Animals Used for Experimental and Other Scientific Purposes" was finally approved by the EC in 1986.

=== Laboratory animal welfare ===
When ICLA was created, there was little regard for laboratory animal welfare or ethics, and until the late 1980s, the ethical treatment of laboratory animals had never been included as one of ICLAS's objectives. This was rectified in 1988 by the adoption of a new ICLAS aim: "to promote the humane use of animals in research through recognition of ethical principles and scientific responsibilities".

=== Nutrition ===
In 1980, the ICLAS Working Party on Nutrition, chaired by the renowned nutritionist Dr. Marie Coates, prepared recommendations on suitable diets for laboratory animals in developing countries and on contaminants in diets generally. These recommendations later formed part of "WHO/ICLAS Guidelines for the Establishment and Use of Laboratory Animals in Developing Countries", published in 2012.

=== Alternative methods ===
In 1959, William Russell and Rex Burch introduced the 3Rs principle as a framework for ethical animal use in research, based on the concepts of Replacement, Reduction, and Refinement, i.e. the use of methods that alleviate or minimize pain, suffering, distress, or lasting harm to the animals.

From then on, concerns about animal welfare in scientific research gained increasing public and legislative attention. This led to greater interest in the use of alternative methods, such as in vitro tests using human corneal epithelial cells, to replace those which had been historically performed on rabbits. From 1994, alternative methods were included in ICLAS programs, such as an ICLAS-sponsored workshop on alternative methods in Spain in 1995.

== ICLAS Activities and achievements, 2000–2019 ==
=== Harmonization of animal care and use policies ===
By the early 2000s, various countries had established guidelines on humane methods of euthanasia and endpoints, i.e., predefined criteria determining when an animal's pain or distress should be alleviated or the animal euthanized to prevent unnecessary suffering.

The problem with these guidelines was that they had been developed in line with each country's culture, tradition, religion, laws and regulations. Consequently, there were variations in the levels of animal suffering that were deemed acceptable. To address this issue, from 2004, ICLAS began work on harmonization. Rather than standardisation, the aim was to look for common principles among the different guidelines and combine them to form a set of ICLAS guidelines that could be used to promote the best practices in the ethical care and use of animals in research worldwide.

This work resulted in the publication of the "Ten Principles for End Points and Animal Euthanasia," in the May 2006 edition of Science, and ICLAS's revision of the Council for International Organizations of Medical Sciences CIOMS "International Guiding Principles for Biomedical Research Involving Animals" in 2012. Additionally, the OIE (World Organization for Animal Health) Terrestrial Animal Code was updated with Chapter 7.8 providing guidance to countries when formulating regulatory requirements, or other forms of oversight, for the use of live animals in research and education, specifically addressing humane endpoints.

In the next decade, ICLAS began work on the worldwide harmonization of research reporting standards, leading to the publication of an article on the topic in EMBO reports in 2018.

=== Formation of new LAS associations ===
A major achievement of ICLAS has been to promote the creation of new LAS associations in developing countries. In the 1990s, new associations were created in Taiwan, Malaysia, Korea and the Philippines, followed in the 2000s by new associations in Chile, Uruguay, Columbia, Peru, Thailand and Cuba, and two in North Africa (Tunisia and Morocco). Over the next two decades, more associations were established in Dominica, Guatemala, Honduras, Panama, Russia, and Georgia.

=== Regional scientific meetings ===
As a way of initiating and stimulating the development of LAS in developing regions, in the 1980s, ICLAS began to hold its Governing Board meetings between General Assemblies in conjunction with ICLAS Regional Scientific meetings. The aim was to support local organizers by assisting with the planning and financing of the meetings and providing qualified lecturers and advisors. For example, in the 1980s, ICLAS Governing Board meetings were held simultaneously with ICLAS Regional Scientific Meetings in Hong Kong, Israel and Kenya; in the 1990s, in Cuba, India and Costa Rica; in the 2000s, in Korea, Greece and Argentina; and in the 2010s, in Thailand, Singapore, and South Africa.

=== Regional committees ===
In the early 1990s, ICLAS began to look for more effective ways to promote laboratory animal science in developing countries. To this end, regional committees containing ICLAS members with firsthand knowledge of their regions' cultures, languages and regulations governing research animals were established to develop ICLAS activities in North and South America; English-speaking and French-speaking Africa; Europe; Southeast and Northeast Asia; and Australia, Oceania and the Indian subcontinent.

Regional Committees are now active in Africa, Europe, America, Asia and Oceania, and all GB members are assigned to the regional committee in which their home region is represented. Although they vary in their objectives, Regional Committees continue to play an important role in developing regional ICLAS activities in the following areas.

- Promoting education and training opportunities, e.g., through training sessions and sponsored travel awards to attend scientific meetings.
- Sharing information on international standards relating to ethical oversight, animal welfare and experimental design and reporting research results.
- Stimulating networking, collaboration and knowledge-exchange in the region.
- Promoting the formation of national and regional LAS associations.
- Encouraging participation from all countries and associations in the region.
- Working with other ICLAS regional committees to exchange ideas and promote opportunities for international sharing.

=== Education and training ===
==== Regional initiatives ====
ICLAS provides funding and assistance to regions for setting up training and certification programs for laboratory animal care staff, research staff, veterinary staff and laboratory animal specialists.

==== Scholarship program for veterinarians ====
In 2014, ICLAS initiated a Scholarship program to support the training of veterinarians in laboratory animal science and medicine. This program was specifically designed for veterinarians who lived in areas without access to training and lacked the necessary funds to enrol on accredited training programs. The objectives were to increase awareness of the need for good science, sound ethical practices and training in LAS and medicine, and to increase the number of veterinarians with internationally recognised qualifications in LAS. Since 2014, scholarships have been awarded to 23 veterinarians living in Pakistan, Chile, Sri Lanka, Thailand, Argentina, Brazil, Panamá, Mexico, the Philippines, Slovenia, Russia, and South Africa.

=== Animal quality ===
In 2006, the ICLAS Network for Promotion of Animal Quality in Research (ICLAS LAQ Network) was created with the aim of establishing a truly international reference for high-quality laboratory animals in the areas of animal health and genetic monitoring.

The Network's first initiative was the ICLAS Performance Evaluation Program (PEP), which was launched in 2008 with the goal of improving the health monitoring of laboratory animals. The aim was to provide a robust tool for any diagnostic laboratory worldwide to self-monitor its diagnostic performance. Under PEP, Network laboratories send unmarked sera and microbiological specimens to the PEP Distribution Center in Barcelona, which are sent annually to participating laboratories for analysis. The labs then self-assess their assay performance by comparing their results with the actual biological contents of the specimens as detailed in a report (expected results) sent later by the Network laboratories. Since the start of the PEP program, 45 diagnostic laboratories have participated from Asia, Australia, Europe, North America, and South America.

In 2016, the ICLAS LAQ Network launched its second initiative, the ICLAS Genetic Reference Monitoring Program (GENRef). Under this self-assessment program, any research organisation worldwide can request reference DNA from the most commonly used mouse breeds in order to check whether the specific strains of research animals they have developed are genetically sound and truly representative of their assumed genotype. Since the program was launched in 2016, 250 DNA strains have been shipped to seven research organisations in Brazil and Asia.

== Activities and achievements, 2020–2026 ==
=== Consolidation ===
Since 2020, ICLAS has focused on consolidating and developing its range of existing programs, namely: education and training, harmonisation of guidelines, the enhancement of animal quality through its PEP and GENRef programs, supporting its Regional Committees, and promoting the continuing development of LAS through international and regional scientific meetings.

=== Communication ===
During this period, ICLAS has made its work more transparent to both its members and the general public by establishing a comprehensive social media presence and providing comprehensive information about all ICLAS programs and activities on its website.

=== Transparency in animal research ===
The 2020s also marked a shift toward greater transparency and openness in animal research. For example, in 2021, ICLAS Oceania signed up to an openness agreement, which aims to inform the public about what animal research involves, the role it plays in scientific discovery, and how such research is regulated.
