= ALECSAT =

ALECSAT (Autologous Lymphoid Effector Cells Specific Against Tumor cells) technology is a novel method of epigenetic cancer immunotherapy being used by the company CytoVac. It uses a patient's own immune system to target tumor cells in prostate cancer, glioblastomas, and potentially pancreatic cancer. ALECSAT research, directed by Alexei Kirken and Karine Dzhandzhugazyan, has led to several clinical trials.

== Method ==
Blood samples containing the required precursors for CD4+ helper T-cell, CD8+ cytotoxic T-cell, and natural killer (NK) cell are extracted from the patient and activated before being re-administered to the patient to induce anti-tumor activity. These cells are activated in a process called “in vitro immunization”, which allows for selection and expansion of T-cells of varying specificity and has been validated in patients with advanced melanoma skin cancer.

In order to have efficient eradication of cancer cells, the immune system cells should be able to both populate in the secondary lymphoid organs for a long-lasting effect and target a shared variety of tumor cells as opposed to one, specific cancer cell. In the ALECSAT method, several different cells are activated to accomplish this. Cytotoxic T lymphocytes (CTL) are activated to target the cells that present proteins characteristic of tumor cells Some tumor cells, however, do not present an antigen due to lack of a major histocompatibility complex (MHC) and therefore cannot be recognized by the CTLs. The cells that do not present an antigen are targeted by activated NK cells, leaving little opportunity for any cancer cells to escape. CTLs and NK cells are both effector cells so helper T-cells (T_{h}) are also prepared in order to create memory cells for long term resistance toward tumor cells. T helper 1 (TH1) cells, when injected with overexpressed tumor antigens, have been shown to enhance migration of antigen-presenting cells (APCs) into the draining lymph node in mice, further enhancing immune response through activation of CTLs.

Tumor antigens are typically cancer/testis antigens. Chemically inducing this antigen in T-cells by DNA demethylation allows the immune system to recognize a wide range of tumors. This method of activation may be used for the preparation of anti-tumor vaccines or for ex vivo activation of the cytotoxic T-cells which can then be followed by the expansion of T-cells through normal, mature dendritic cells. The latter method is utilized for ALECSAT to treat cancer by adoptive T-cell immunotherapy.

== Process ==
Refer to the adjacent diagram for a depiction the ALECSAT protocol of immunization that occurs over a period of 26 days:

The first step is the isolation of the blood into lymphocytes and monocytes. The lymphocytes are frozen and the monocytes are differentiated into dendritic cells. After 6 days, the lymphocytes are mixed with dendritic cells and incubated for eight days. This process creates CD4+ enriched lymphocytes. After this, the lymphocytes are treated for three days in order to induce the expression of CGL antigen. Next, another set of frozen lymphocytes are mixed with the CD4+ expressing CGL antigens and incubated for 11 days. After that, dendritic cells are added to the lymphocytes to induce further lymphocyte proliferation. Lastly, after seven days of culture, the cells are prepared for injection. This whole process takes a total of 26 days.

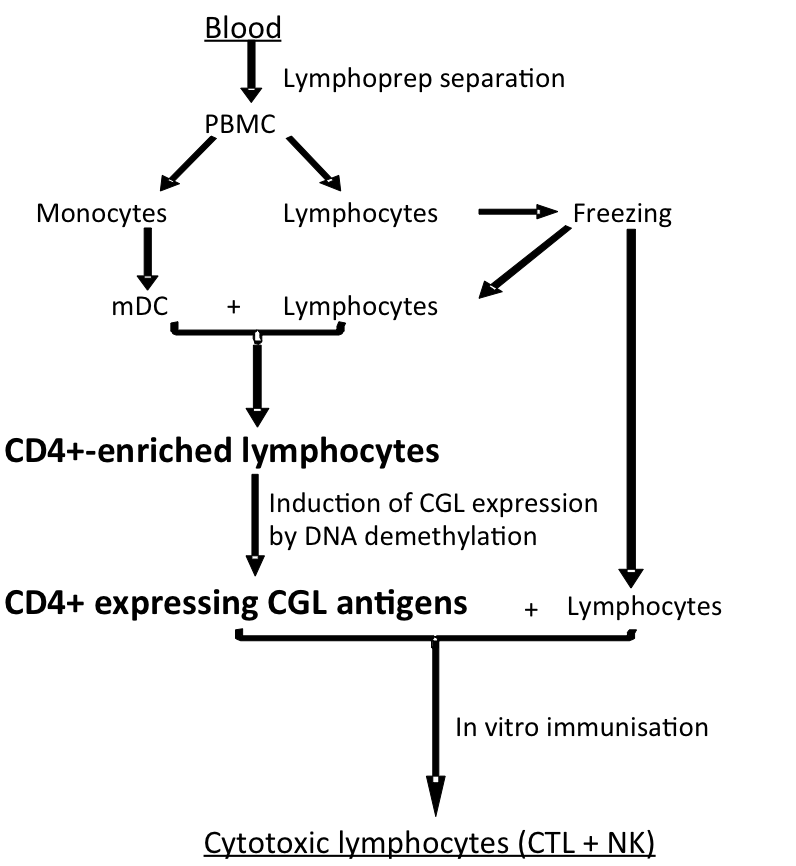
ALECSAT Protocol

== Research ==
Research on adoptive transfer in melanoma patients laid the groundwork for companies focusing on adoptive transfer research in other types of cancer. Research carried out at the Department of Tumour Cell Biology in Copenhagen has shown that CTL clones targeting specific melanoma tumor associated antigens (gp100 and MART-1) can successfully proliferate if melanoma cell lines are carefully preselected. At the same department, the SCID mouse model was demonstrated as “an excellent model system” for studying interaction between tumors and CTLs. Using this model, eradication of a human melanoma tumor by in vitro generating CTL clone was accomplished. In a study run at the University de la Sante, the adoptive transfer of cloned T cells in “in vitro immunization” caused increased frequencies of cancer fighting T cells in 18 out of 35 melanoma patients.
