= Dales Pony =

British breed of horse

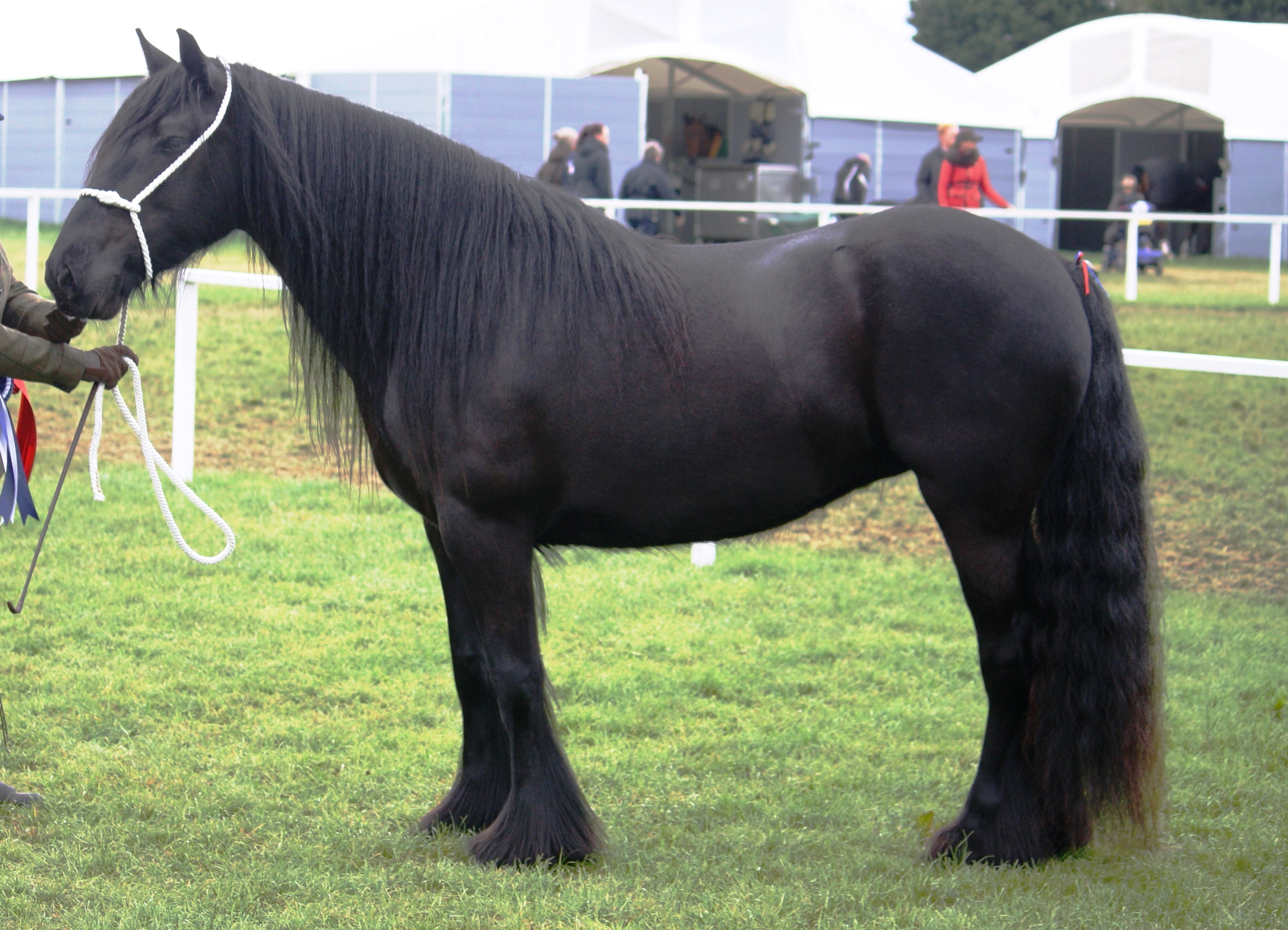

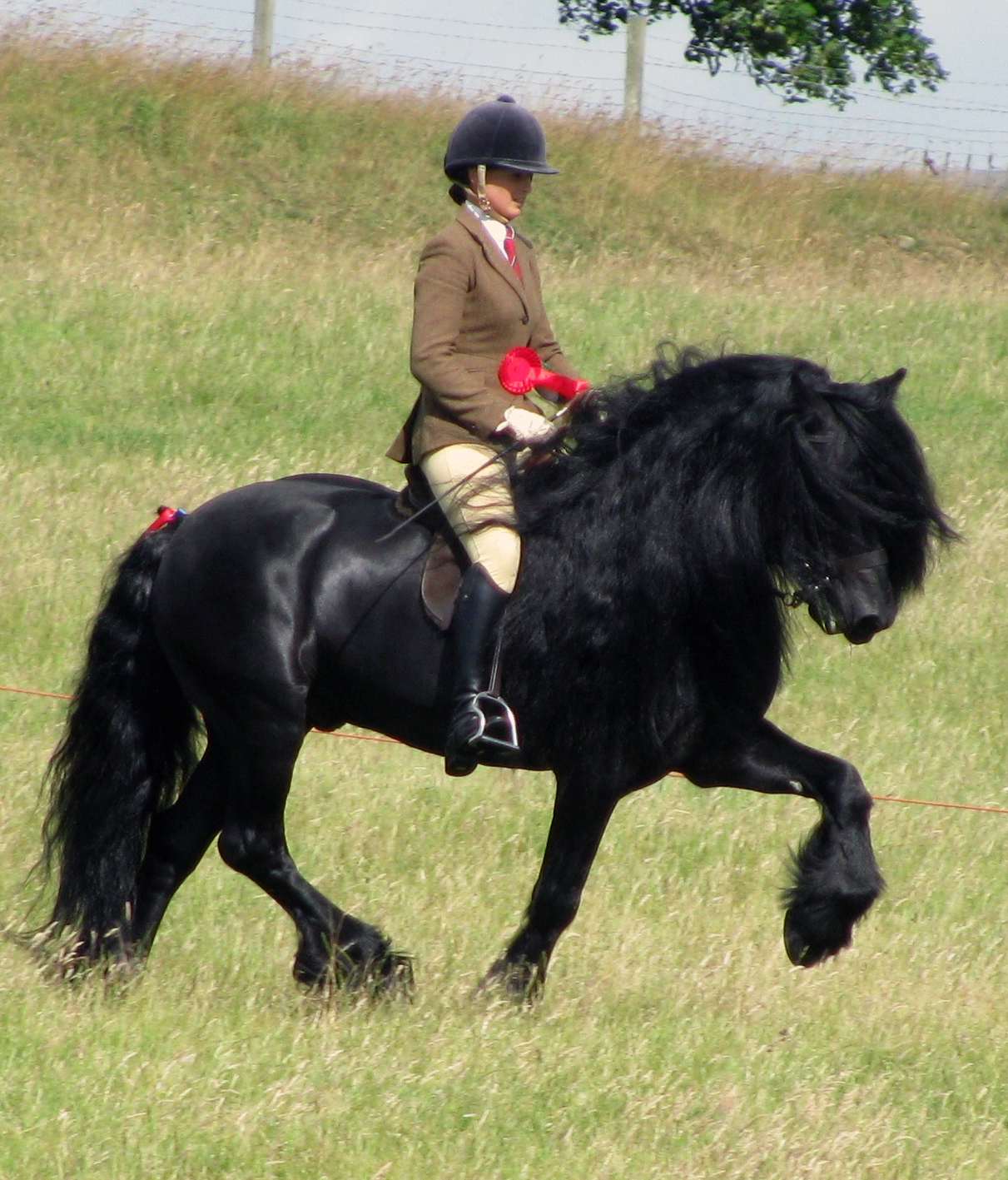
- Conservation status: RBST: priority; TLC:critical
- Country of origin: United Kingdom

Traits
- Height: 14.0-14.2 hands
- Colour: black; brown; bay; grey; roan

Breed standards
- Dales Pony Society

The Dales Pony is a British breed of pony that originated in the Yorkshire Dales in northern England. It is one of the nine native mountain and moorland pony breeds of the United Kingdom with a stud-book established in 1916. Historically, Dales Ponies were packhorses for the local lead mining operations. The breed was used extensively by the British Army in both world wars, and during the Second World War came close to extinction. Subsequent conservation efforts have had some success in rebuilding the population, but it is still an endangered breed. Its qualities include strength, hardiness, stamina, courage, intelligence and good disposition.

== Characteristics ==
The Dales Pony is ideally 14 to 14.2 hands (56 to 58 inches, 142 to 147 cm). The head is straight, neat, and broad between the eyes, with a fine muzzle and incurving ears. The body is fairly short in the back, with a broad and deep rib cage, long, broad and well-muscled quarters, a well-muscled neck of a good length joining neatly into strong withers and strong sloping shoulders. The legs are very muscular, with hard, dense bone, clearly defined tendons, flexible pasterns, and large round hooves with open heels. The mane, tail and leg feathers are straight, silky and abundant.

The majority of the ponies are black, though brown, bay, grey and roan colours are also acceptable. The only white markings permitted on the head are a star and/or a snip; stripes, blazes, and white muzzles are not allowed. The hind legs may have a small amount of white, not extending above the fetlock joint, though ponies with excessive white markings may be registered in the B register of the stud book. A Dales Pony should move with a great deal of energy and power, lifting the hooves well clear of the ground. The over-all impression should be of an alert, courageous but calm and kind animal. Foals by Dales stallions and non-Dales mares may be registered as part-breds. Foals out of Dales mares and non-Dales stallions may not be registered, as the stud book wishes to promote breeding of purebred ponies to maintain the current population levels.

=== Health ===
The Dales Pony is one of three breeds known to be a carrier of the fatal genetic disease foal immunodeficiency syndrome, a recessive disease. Foals that inherit the gene from both parents appear normal when born, but have a compromised immune system and anaemia, leading to untreatable infections and death within three months. A genetic test was developed in 2010, and approximately 12% of the Dales Pony population the UK were found to be carriers. Genetic testing allows breeders to avoid mating two carrier animals.

== Breed history ==
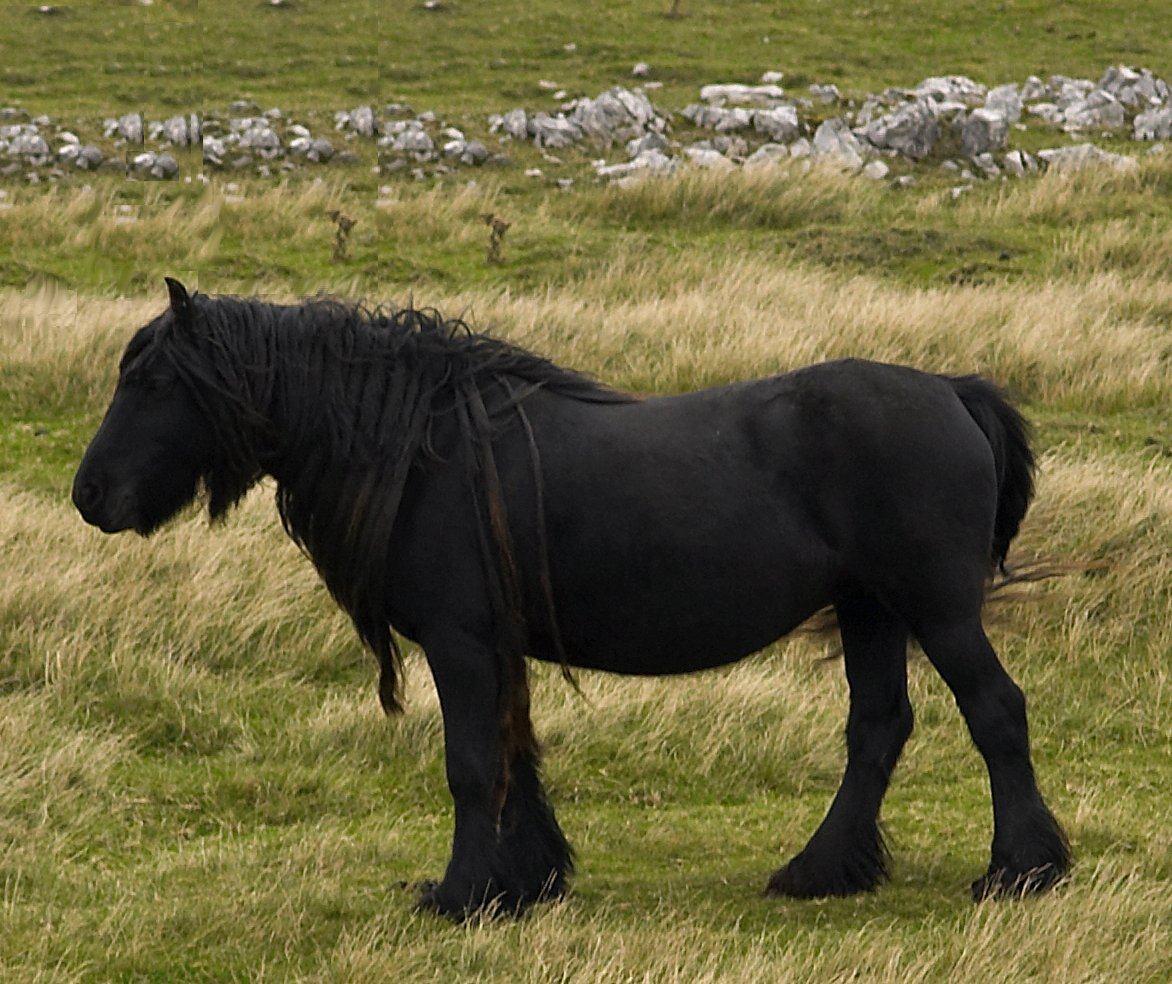
Near Wild Boar Fell, in the Yorkshire Dales National Park

Horses have been present and used in the Dales area from early times. Horse remains dating to Roman times were found in the Ribchester area of the Dales, during North Pennines Archaeology's excavations at land behind the Black Bull Inn in 2009. The Romans themselves named an ancient British tribe to the east of the Pennines the Gabrantovici, or 'horse-riding warriors'. The history of the modern Dales Pony is strongly linked to the history of lead mining in the Dales area of England, which stretches from the Derbyshire peaks to the Scottish borders. Lead has been mined in this area since Roman times, and Richard Scrope, then Chancellor of England, owned lead mines at Wensleydale in the 14th century. Iron ore, fuel for smelting, and finished lead were all carried on pack ponies, with each pony carrying up to 240 lb (110 kg) at a time. Pack pony trains of up to 20 ponies worked 'loose' (not led), under the supervision of one mounted train leader.

The modern Dales Pony is descended from a number of breeds, with the original working ponies being bred by crossing the Scottish Galloway pony with native Pennine pony mares in the Dales area in the late 1600s. A century later Norfolk Cob bloodlines were brought into the breed, which traced back to the Darley Arabian, and most ponies today have pedigrees which can trace back directly to this influential horse (one of the foundation sires of the modern Thoroughbred). Clydesdale, Norfolk Trotter, and Yorkshire Roadster blood was added to improve the trotting ability of the Dales. The bloodline of the Welsh Cob stallion Comet was also added during the 19th century to increase the size of the ponies, leaving a lasting resemblance between the two breeds. With their agility, power and speed, the Dales had great success in trotting races of the 18th century and were also used in organised hunts. The Fell pony continued to intermingle with the Dales into the early 20th century. In 1912, Dalesman was chosen as a Fell premium stallion by the Board of Agriculture. In 1924, he was re-registered as a Dales Pony.

The Dales Pony stud book was opened in 1916, with the formation of the Dales Pony Improvement Society, after the introduction of Clydesdale blood threatened to affect the quality of the ponies. Stallion premiums were awarded first by the Board of Agriculture, and later by the War Office, to ensure that stallions displaying the best of the breed characteristics were used for breeding. Members of the breed served with the British army in Europe during the First World War. In the early 1920s, 200 of the ponies were purchased by the British army. The army took only the finest stock, with the least amount of draft blood. The specifications for the purchased ponies were very specific: all were older than five years, stood 14.0 to 14.2 hands high, weighed at least 1,000 pounds (450 kg) with a girth measurement of 68 inches (170 cm), and were able to pack at least 294 pounds (133 kg) in mountainous terrain.

The breed almost disappeared during the Second World War as ponies were taken for breeding vanners (animals which pulled commercial wagons), for work in towns and cities, and for use by the British Army as packhorses and artillery horses. Many ponies used by the military in Europe were left behind after the war, and in many cases they were slaughtered for food. The population declined during the war to such an extent that only four new fillies were registered in 1955. However, post-war conservation efforts included searching for unregistered ponies of the proper type. The 1960s saw three Fell pony stallions interbred with Dale mares, to help save the breed. In 1964 the Dales Pony Society underwent reorganisation. At the same time, a "Grading-Up Register" was developed, with the aim of identifying and breeding ponies with characteristics of the original Dales type. The grading-up program was successful, and by 1971, populations had been rebuilt to the point that the program was discontinued. By the 1990s, the population had grown enough to allow some ponies to be exported – twelve to Canada in 1991 and four to the US in 1994. By 1999, there were 60 registered ponies in North America, and an estimated 800 worldwide. In the same year, the Dales Pony Society of America was formed.

In 2015, the Rare Breeds Survival Trust reclassified the Dales Pony from category 2 "endangered" to category 1 "critical" status, meaning there was a United Kingdom population of fewer than 300 registered breeding females, and it remains in 2025 in category 1 (renamed to "priority"). In 2014, the US-based Livestock Conservancy had listed the breed as "threatened", meaning that population numbers worldwide were sub-5,000 and annual US registrations were less than 1,000. However, by 2025 it had been changed to "critical", meaning fewer than 200 annual registrations in the United States and an estimated global population of less than 500.

== Uses ==
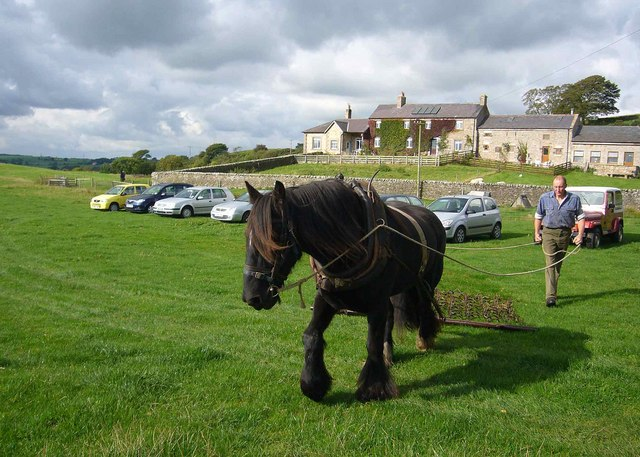
In harness

The Dales Pony may compete in show jumping, cross-country, dressage, driving or three-day eventing. It is well suited to endurance riding and pony-trekking, as they can carry novice or experienced riders, adults or children alike, over all kinds of terrain and for long distances. Small herds still roam free in the eastern Pennines, and in 2007 there were estimated to be around 30 mares of breeding age in feral herds.
