= NOG mouse =

Immunodeficient mouse strain

A NOG (NOD/Shi-scid/IL-2Rγ^{null}) mouse is a new generation of severely immunodeficient mouse, developed by Central Institute for Experimental Animals (CIEA) in 2000. The NOG mouse accepts heterologous cells much more easily compared with any other type of immunodeficient rodent models, such as nude mouse and NOD/scid mouse. Thus, the mouse can be the best model as a highly efficient recipient of human cells to engraft, proliferate and differentiate. This unique feature offers a great opportunity for enhancing therapy researches of cancer, leukemia, visceral diseases, AIDS, and other human diseases. It also provides applications for cancer, infection, regeneration, and hematology researches.

== Origin ==
The NOG mouse was generated in CIEA in 2000 by back-cross mating of C57BL/6J-IL-2Rγ^{null} mouse that was originally developed by Kazuo Sugamura, a professor of Tohoku University, to NOD/Shi-scid mouse that was developed in CIEA.

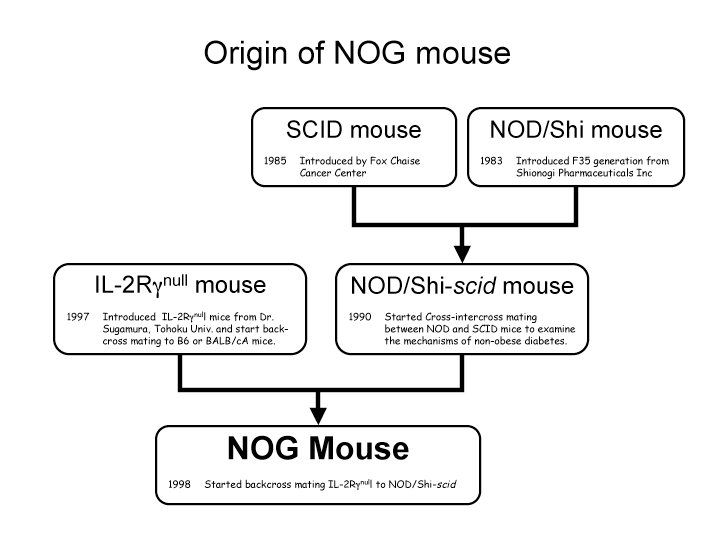

== Characteristics ==
- No activity of T cell, B cell and NK cell
- Reduced complement system activity
- Dysfunction of macrophage
- Dysfunction of dendritic cell
- No leakiness: no incidence of T, B cells with aging
- No incidence of lymphoma

NOG mouse has multiple immunodeficiencies that are principally derived from three strains of mice: 1) NOD/Shi inbred strain, 2) SCID, 3) IL-2Rγ^{null}. These include:

- Reduced innate immunity derived from a NOD inbred strain, which involves a macrophage dysfunction, and a defect of complement hemolytic activity and reduced NK activity. The NOD/Shi inbred strain was first discovered by Makino et al. as autoimmune non-obese-type diabetes mice.
- Lack of functional T and B cells that is derived from a mutation of protein kinase (Prkdc: protein kinase, DNA activated, catalytic polypeptide), which is the causative gene of the scid mutation
- Lack of NK cells, dendritic cell dysfunctions, and other unknown deficiencies due to inactivation of the IL-2Rγ gene.

== Applications to medical researches ==
- Cancer
- Infectious Diseases
- Regenerative Medicine
- Hematology
- Humanized mouse

== See also ==
- Nude mouse
- SCID mouse
