= Mouse Genome Informatics =

Free, online database and bioinformatics resource

Mouse Genome Informatics (MGI) is a free, online database and bioinformatics resource hosted by The Jackson Laboratory, with funding by the National Human Genome Research Institute (NHGRI), the National Cancer Institute (NCI), and the Eunice Kennedy Shriver National Institute of Child Health and Human Development (NICHD). MGI provides access to data on the genetics, genomics and biology of the laboratory mouse to facilitate the study of human health and disease. The database integrates multiple projects, including Mouse Models of Human Cancer database, Mouse Genome Database, and Mouse Gene Expression Database (GXD). As of 2018, MGI contains data curated from over 230,000 publications.

== History ==
The MGI resource was first published online in 1994 and is a collection of data, tools, and analyses created and tailored for use in the laboratory mouse, a widely used model organism. It is "the authoritative source of official names for mouse genes, alleles, and strains", which follow the guidelines established by the International Committee on Standardized Genetic Nomenclature for Mice. The history and focus of Jackson Laboratory research and production facilities generates tremendous knowledge and depth which researchers can mine to advance their research. A dedicated community of mouse researchers, worldwide enhances and contributes to the knowledge as well. This is an indispensable tool for any researcher using the mouse as a model organism for their research, and for researchers interested in genes that share homology with the mouse genes. Various mouse research support resources including animal collections and free colony management software are also available at the MGI site.

== Mouse Genome Database ==
The Mouse Genome Database collects and curates comprehensive phenotype and functional annotations for mouse genes and alleles. This is an NHGRI-funded project which contributes to the Mouse Genome Informatics database.

== Mouse gene expression database ==
The Gene Expression Database is a community resource of mouse developmental expression information.

== History ==
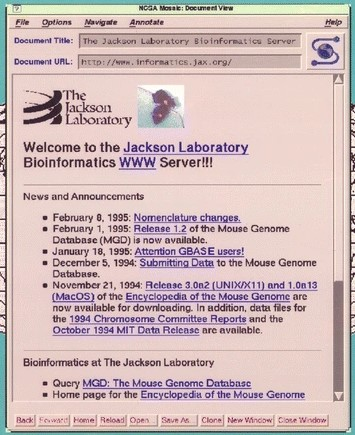
The Mouse Genome Informatics homepage as it appeared in 1994

MGI evolved from a project funded by the National Center for Human Genome Research in 1989 to combine the databases of several Jackson Laboratory scientists and create a tool for visualizing data on the mouse genome. The result of that project, led by Joseph H. Nadeau, Larry E. Mobraaten, and Janan T. Eppig, was called the "Encyclopedia of the Mouse Genome" and distributed via floppy disk semi-annually to around 300 scientists around the world. In 1992, that group joined with the team responsible for developing the "Genomic Database for Mouse", led by Muriel T. Davisson and Thomas H. Roderick, to start the "Mouse Genome Informatics" project. That project resulted in the first online release of the "Mouse Genome Database" in 1994.

== See also ==
- FlyBase
- Rat Genome Database
- Saccharomyces Genome Database
- WormBase
- Xenbase
- Zebrafish Information Network
