= Foal immunodeficiency syndrome =

Recessive genetic disease in horses

Foal immunodeficiency syndrome (FIS), originally known as Fell pony syndrome, mainly affects two breeds of ponies: the Fell and Dales. FIS is a recessive genetic disease. Affected foals appear normal at birth, but become weak, and either die or must be euthanized by three months of age due to persistent infections caused by immunodeficiency.

== Symptoms ==
Affected foals are healthy when born. By one month of age, foals become depressed, lose weight, and have diarrhea and a cough with nasal discharge. The diarrhea and cough initially improve in response to treatment, but then worsen as treatment becomes ineffective. The foal's coat becomes dry and staring and the foal weakens further by two months of age as the foal fails to suckle, and by the age of 3 months, the foal dies (or is euthanized), giving this disease a 100% mortality rate.

== Genetics ==
FIS is a recessive genetic disease; affected foals are homozygous for the affected gene, that is, they have two copies of the gene, one inherited copy inherited from each parent. For this to occur, both parents must be carriers of the gene. In 2010, 39% of Fell ponies and 18% of Dales ponies tested prior to breeding carried the affected gene. The mutation is also found in approximately 9% of US and European Gypsy horses.

A single nucleotide polymorphism (mutation), in the sodium/myo-inositol cotransporter (SLC5A3) gene causes FIS. This gene is crucial in regulating a cell's response to osmotic stress; an alteration to the function of the gene leads to failure of red blood cell production (erythropoiesis) and failure of the immune system.

== Diagnosis and treatment ==
Genetic testing will diagnose whether the foal has FIS. There is no effective treatment for the infections that the foal develops; euthanasia is the preferred option.

== History ==
The disease was first reported in 1996. The first cases were found in Fell ponies, and the disease was initially termed "Fell pony syndrome." The disease appeared to have a genetic component, and, after hereditary diseases known to affect other horse breeds were investigated, it was concluded that this was a newly identified disease. The cause of disease was tracked down using a genome-wide association study, which implicated a region on horse chromosome 25. This chromosome was sequenced in five affected horses, and in 2009, a mutation was discovered in the SLC5A3 gene. Shortly after this, a genetic test was launched for horse owners to identify whether their ponies were carriers.

== Outlook ==
For the affected Fell and Dales pony breeds, genetic testing of ponies prior to mating can ensure that carriers are never mated together, which will prevent affected foals from being born. Over time, the frequency of the disease gene will decrease, without having an adverse impact on the genetic variation of the pony population.

== See also ==
- Severe combined immunodeficiency (non-human)
