= Tg-PVR mouse =

Tg-PVR mouse is a transgenic mouse, developed at the Central Institute for Experimental Animals (CIEA), carrying the human poliovirus receptor (PVR) gene, to be used in testing the neurovirulence of oral polio vaccine (OPV). The neurovirulent safety and consistency of OPV had been traditionally assayed in the monkey neurovirulence test (MNVT), as only primates, including humans and monkeys, are susceptible to polioviruses. After the development of the Tg-PVR mouse, the suitability of the mouse to replace monkeys for OPV testing was evaluated and confirmed.

== Origin ==
Tg-PVR mice were developed to enable the study of poliovirus infection in mice, which are naturally resistant to this virus. Poliovirus primarily infects humans and certain primates due to the presence of a specific cellular receptor, CD155, which is absent in mice.

To overcome this limitation, Koike et al. introduced the human gene encoding the poliovirus receptor into the mouse genome in 1991 using transgenic techniques. The introduced gene is expressed in various tissues, rendering the mice susceptible to poliovirus infection. The resulting transgenic mice exhibit clinical manifestations similar to those observed in humans and primates, particularly involving motor neuron damage in the central nervous system.
