= Tg-rasH2 mouse =

A Tg-rasH2 mouse is an innovative transgenic mouse, developed in Central Institute for Experimental Animals (CIEA), carrying the three copies of human prototype c-Ha-ras oncogenes with endogenous promoter and enhancer in tandem. Under Alternative Carcinogenicity Testing (ACT) project conducted by International Life Sciences Institute (ILSI) and ILSI Health and Environmental Sciences Institute (HESI), comprehensive evaluation studies on the Tg-rasH2 mouse bioassay system were performed and the usefulness of the system was validated for carcinogenicity studies by 23 international pharmaceutical companies. In the studies, it was confirmed that Tg-rasH2 mice are sensitive to both genotoxic and non-genotoxic human carcinogens and show no response to non-carcinogens. As a consequence, the Tg-rasH2 mice have been accepted as a short-term carcinogenicity study system enabling to reduce the conventional two-year study period to 26 weeks.

== History ==
- 1989: Tg-rasH2 mice were first developed in CIEA.
- 1992: CIEA started development of carcinogenicity bioassay system using Tg-rasH2 mice.
- 1996: Policy to replace the 2-year study on mice with the short-term study decided at ICH4.
- 1996-2000: Usefulness of rasH2 mice validated by ILSI/HESI international research.
- 2001: Production and sales of Tg-rasH2 mice.
