= Tatsuji Nomura =

Japanese scientist

- 野村達次
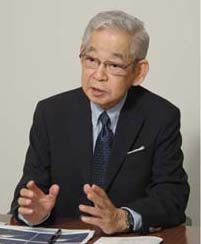
- Nomura in 2007
- Born: May 15, 1922; Tokyo, Japan
- Died: 11 January 2013 (aged 90)
- Citizenship: Japanese
- Education: Keio University
- Awards: Person of Cultural Merit, Japan (1997)
- Scientific career
- Fields: Medicine
- Workplaces: Central Institute for Experimental Animals, Japan

Tatsuji Nomura (野村 達次, Nomura Tatsuji) (May 15, 1922 – January 11, 2013) was a pioneer in the development of laboratory animals with the aim of assuring reproducibility of experimental results in medical research. He was Director of the Central Institute for Experimental Animals (CIEA), Japan.

== Development of Comprehensive Animal Experimentation Systems ==
His most important achievement to date is the establishment of comprehensive animal experimentation systems using strictly defined laboratory animals to assure reproducibility of experimental results in medical research. Before his concepts were applied, it was generally considered to be very difficult or even impossible to obtain reproducible results in medical research using laboratory animals, mainly due to the traditional consensus that the animals are living organisms with individual differences. He has completely changed this out-dated paradigm in medical research by establishing comprehensive animal experimentation systems.

One of the factors that affects the reproducibility of the results of animal experiments is the proximate environment in which the experiment is performed including the temperature and humidity of the animal room, the size of cages and caretakers. The concept of the dramatype, which refers to the effects of the proximate environment on the phenotype, was introduced. Russell and Burch proposed the term "dramatype" in 1959 from the standpoint of animal welfare (Reduction), but Dr. Nomura developed this concept to promote the importance of control of the environment to assure reproducibility of the results of animal experiments.

Based on such systems, he has established international research collaborations to develop three animal models:

- Transgenic Polio Mice - Widely used in polio vaccine neurovirulence testing as a replacement for monkeys. (Approved by World Health Organization in March 2003)
- Trangenic rasH2 Mice - Shortening of the carcinogenicity test period in drug development from two years to six months. (Approved by FDA, NTP, and EU in 2003)
- NOD/Shi-scid/IL-2Rγnull Mice (NOG Mice) - New generation of extremely immunodeficient mice that are the best candidate for humanized mice to date.

== Application of animal ethics in CIEA ==
CIEA has developed animal experimentation systems based on the concept "scientific animal experiments with reproducible results can not be achieved unless the experiments are performed ethically with the animals maintained in a normal state." To this end, the 3R (Replacement, Refinement, and Reduction of Animals in Research) principle proposed by Russell and Burch in 1959 was adopted.

By using animals under strict quality control and controlling the environment so that the animals are not subjected to stress, it is possible to reduce the number of animals used in experiments (Reduction among the 3Rs). It is also possible to prevent infections such as mouse hepatitis or Sendai virus through periodic monitoring of the microbiological status of animals for early diagnosis and quality assurance and to minimize discomfort of the animals (Refinement).

These policies are intended to maintain the animals in a normal state by minimizing stress. If the animals are not maintained in a normal state, reproducibility of results of experiments on animals as "living measuring instruments" cannot be assured.

A system has been established in which mice with the human polio virus receptor introduced (polio mice) replace monkeys, which are closest to humans, used in neurovirulence testing of live polio vaccine (Replacement). The number of animals used can also be reduced by using mice subject to stricter quality control than monkeys.

"Replacement" refers to a "switch to research not using animals" but a "switch to a method not using phylogenetically higher animals such as monkeys" is a method of natural protection. Using this alternative we succeeded in reducing the zoonotic risks for investigators (Refinement).

== Central Institute for Experimental Animals (CIEA) ==
Dr. Nomura was Director of the Central Institute for Experimental Animals, Japan, that he founded in 1952, to improve the level of medical research.

== Biography ==
- 2006–present: Central Institute for Experimental Animals (CIEA) Chairman of the Board
- 1999–present: Councilor, The Japan Society for Organ Preservation and Medical Biology
- 1997-2003: Chairman, International Council for Laboratory Animal Science (ICLAS) Monitoring & Reference Centre Program
- 1997: Japanese Association for Laboratory Animal Science (JALAS) Honorary Member
- 1995: President, JALAS 42nd General Meeting at Yokohama, Japan
- 1995-2003: ICLAS Vice President
- 1988: ICLAS Honorary Member
- 1986: President, 15th Annual Meeting of JALAS
- 1982-1998: Chairman, National Committee on Laboratory Animal Science, Science Council of Japan
- 1981–present: Visiting Professor, Keio University School of Medicine
- 1980–present: Chairman (Japan), US-Japan Meeting on Laboratory Animal Science
- 1972-1979: ICLAS Treasurer
- 1972-2003: ICLA, ICLAS National Member (Science Council of Japan)
- 1971: ICLA, Secretary-General, Asian Pacific Meeting on Laboratory Animal Science
- 1970-1972: ICLA Scientific Member (Japan Experimental Animal Research Association)
- 1966–present: CIEA Director
- 1957-1997: Member of Board of Directors, JALAS
- 1956: Doctor of Medical Science
- 1952: Established CIEA
- 1945-1954: Institute of Infectious Diseases, University of Tokyo, Japan
- 1945: Graduated from Keio University School of Medicine, Doctor of Medicine

== Awards ==
- 2005: Marie Coates Award, ICLAS
- 2001: Degree of Doctor of Veterinary Medicine, Honoris Causa, Mahidol University Council, Thailand
- 2000: Special Recognition Award, Center for Biologics Evaluation and Research, U.S. Food and Drug Administration (practical development of TgPVR21 mice)
- 1998: The Order of the Sacred Treasure Gold and Silver Star, Japanese Government
- 1998: Special Recognition Award, Center for Drug Evaluation and Research, U.S. Food and Drug Administration, U.S.A. (practical development of TgrasH2 mice)
- 1997: Person of Cultural Merit, Japanese Government
- 1993: Eiji Yoshikawa Cultural Award, Japan
- 1988: Mühlbock Memorial Award, ICLAS
- 1984: The Medal of Honor with a Purple Ribbon, Japanese Government
- 1975: The Highest Achievement Award, Japan Medical Association
- 1965: The First KOJIMA Memorial Award, Japan
