= Central Institute for Experimental Animals =

Research center in Kanagawa, Japan

Coordinates: 35°32′24.36″N 139°45′15.59″E

Central Institute for Experimental Animals Acronym: CIEA
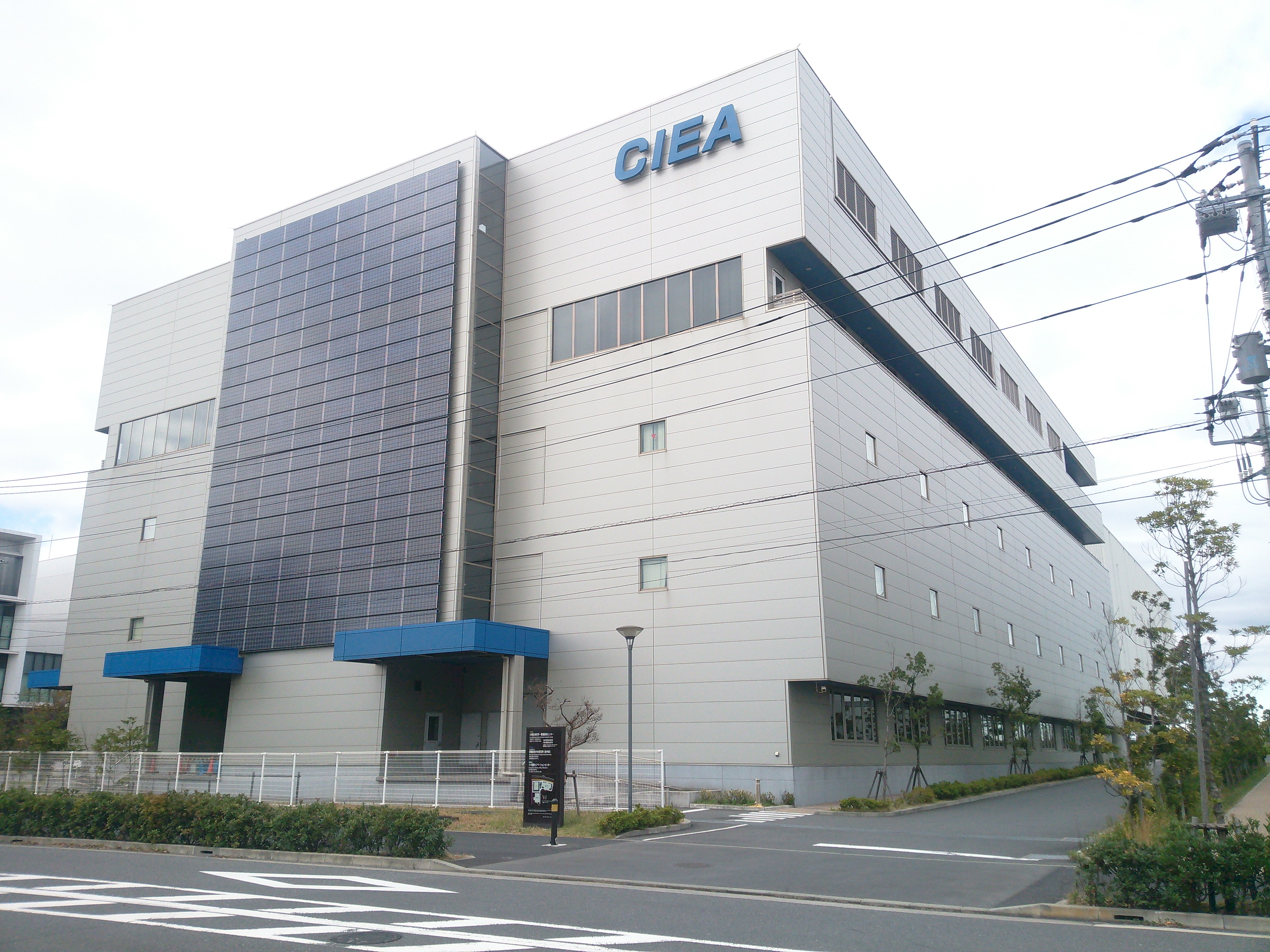
- Formation: 1952
- Headquarters: Kawasaki, Kanagawa, Japan
- Director: Tatsuji Nomura
- Website: http://www.ciea.or.jp/en/index.html

Central Institute for Experimental Animals (CIEA) (実験動物中央研究所) is a research center for experimental animals in Japan. It was founded by Tatsuji Nomura in 1952 with the mission of improving the level of biomedical research.

== Main achievements and ongoing projects ==
- Establishment of the world first and only monitoring center for experimental animals in 1970. Appointed as an International Council for Laboratory Animal Science (ICLAS) Monitoring Center in 1979.
- Development and establishment of Tg-PVR mouse, in which a human poliovirus receptor gene is introduced, used as a safety testing for oral polio vaccine.
- Establishment of Tg-rasH2 mouse, in which a human prototype c-Ha-ras oncogene is introduced, and evaluation of their practical usefulness. Achieved a high level of accuracy in carcinogenicity testing for drugs and reduced the testing period to six months from the conventional two years' system.
- Developing spinal cord injury model and Parkinson's disease model using the common marmoset (New World monkey).
- Establishment of a severe immunodeficient mouse, NOD/Shi-scid, IL-2Rγnull mouse (NOD/SCID/IL-2Rγnull mouse, NOG mouse) and development of its applications to various animal experiments and testing systems.

== ICLAS Monitoring Center ==
ICLAS Monitoring Center
- Headquarters: Kawasaki, Kanagawa, Japan
- Director: Tatsuji Nomura
- Website: http://www.ciea.or.jp/English/A4_monitoring.htm

ICLAS Monitoring Center was established in the CIEA in 1979 and is the only center in the world for testing and verifying the quality of laboratory animals, under the direction of Dr. Tatsuji Nomura with a conduct of International Council for Laboratory Animal Science (ICLAS).

=== History of the Monitoring Center ===
The Monitoring Center program came on the agenda in ICLAS early in the 1970s and the goal was set to assist the scientific bodies in finding animals of the highest quality. In 1979, a workshop was organized in Japan under the auspices of ICLAS and the International Cancer Research Workshop (ICREW) with representatives from the governing board of ICLAS, members of the ICLAS working party, and a number of experts from throughout the world. At that time, the planning of an ICLAS Monitoring Center System and the preparation of an International Manual on Genetic Monitoring, which had been in development for some time, was progressing well. The final proposal was later approved by the Board as a realistic and well-founded scheme that would give the users of laboratory animals a far better program and would help re-establish confidence in the system. The first ICLAS Genetic Monitoring Center in the world was then established in 1980 at CIEA in Japan, by Dr. Tatsuji Nomura, Director of CIEA. This center had already served as an Asian Regional Coordinating Center in the ICLAS Reference Center project since 1979.

== History ==
- 1952 Founded in Nishitama District, Tokyo, Japan
- 1957 Authorized as a non-profit research organization under Ministry of Education, Japan
- 1962 Specific Pathogen Free (SPF) animal production facility was established in Nogawa, Kawasaki, Japan
- 1965 Animal production and supply department was spun off as CLEA Japan, Inc.
- 1966 Preclinical Research Laboratory was established
- 1969 Germ-free animal facility was established
- 1973 Bioscience Research Department was established
- 1976 Organized "The 2nd International Workshop on Nude Mice", Tokyo, Chairman T. Nomura
- 1979 Appointed as ICLAS Monitoring Center
- 1982 Embryological Engineering Laboratory was established
- 1985 Laboratory animal monitoring facilities completed
- 1987 Developmental Engineering Experiment Manual published
- 1988 High priority "Laboratory animal monitoring project" started
- 1991 From Six Mice: History of Central Institute for Experimental Animals published
- 1992 Laboratory Animal Cryopreservation Facilities completed
- 2001 Center for the Advancement of Health and Biosciences (CAHB) established as a nonprofit organization in the United States
- 2002 Global business development was initiated
- 2005 NOG mouse patent granted
- 2006 Tatsuji Nomura becomes chairman of the Board of Directors of CIEA
- 2006 Organized "The 1st International Workshop on Humanized Mice", Tokyo, Chairman T. Nomura
