= NSG mouse =

Immunodeficient laboratory mice brand

The NSG mouse (NOD scid gamma mouse) is a brand of immunodeficient laboratory mice, developed and marketed by Jackson Laboratory, which carries the strain NOD.Cg-Prkdc^{scid} Il2rg^{tm1Wjl}/SzJ. NSG branded mice are among the most immunodeficient described to date. NSG branded mice lack mature T cells, B cells, and natural killer (NK) cells. NSG branded mice are also deficient in multiple cytokine signaling pathways, and they have many defects in innate immunity. The compound immunodeficiencies in NSG branded mice permit the engraftment of a wide range of primary human cells, and enable sophisticated modeling of many areas of human biology and disease. NSG branded mice were developed in the laboratory of Dr. Leonard Shultz at Jackson Laboratory, which owns the NSG trade mark.

== Features of NSG mice ==
- The genetic background, derived from inbred NOD mouse strain NOD/ShiLtJ, contributes reductions in innate immunity that include an absent hemolytic complement system, reduced dendritic cell function, and defective macrophage activity. The NOD/ShiLtJ background also contributes an allele of the Sirpa gene that renders the bone marrow niche very permissive to colonization by human hematopoietic stem cells.
- The Prkdc^{scid} mutation^{a}, commonly known as "scid" or "severe combined immunodeficiency", essentially eliminates adaptive immunity. Prkdc^{scid} is a loss-of-function mutation in the mouse homologue of the human PRKDC gene, which encodes a protein that resolves DNA strand breaks that occur during V(D)J recombination in developing T and B lymphocytes. Mice homozygous for the mutation have severely reduced numbers of mature T and B cells. The phenotypic penetrance of Prkdc^{scid} varies among inbred strain backgrounds, but the mutation is most effective at eliminating adaptive immunity on the NOD genetic background. Due to the Prkdc^{scid} mutation, however, the NSG strain shows high sensitivity to radiation, T-cell leakage, and increased incidence of thymic lymphoma formation; as such, this strain cannot be used to predict clinical response to certain anticancer drugs, or for long-term transplantation studies.
- The Il2rg^{tm1Wjl} targeted mutation^{b} is a complete null mutation in the gene encoding the interleukin 2 receptor gamma chain (IL2Rγ, homologous to IL2RG in humans). IL2Rγ is a common component of the cell surface receptors that bind and transduce signals from six distinct interleukins. Signaling through IL2Rγ is required for the differentiation and function of many hematopoietic cells. Notably, the absence of IL2Rγ blocks NK cell differentiation, and thereby removes a major obstacle preventing the efficient engraftment of primary human cells.

== Research applications ==
- Primary human lung tumor xenografts that preserve the tumor microenvironment during long-term engraftment.
- Humanized model for evaluation of possible cancer curing gene therapy.
- Models of acute or chronic leukemia established using cancer cells collected from patients.
- A highly sensitive platform for studying epithelial and cancer stem cells.
- Establishing a functional, humanized immune system from engrafted human hematopoietic stem cells and progenitors.
- Humanized models for studying human-specific infectious diseases like HIV, Epstein Barr virus, malaria, and Dengue fever. Humanized models also aid in testing new therapies.
- Studying allograft rejection after pancreatic islet transplantation therapy for type 1 diabetes.

== Animal model of skin transplantation ==
The development of an optimized NSG (NOD-scid IL2rynull) immunodeficient mouse model for human skin transplantation and the study of allograft rejection. The authors show that in NSG mice, human skin grafts are initially infiltrated by host murine Gr1+ myeloid cells, which impairs wound healing and the survival of human endothelium. However, injection of an anti-Gr1 antibody eliminates this infiltrate, improves graft healing, preserves human blood vessels, and allows the survival of passenger human leukocytes within the graft. These treated mice can then be injected with allogeneic human peripheral blood mononuclear cells (CD4+ or CD8+), which induces rapid and complete rejection of the skin graft, with destruction of the epidermis, endothelium, and dermal cells. This anti-Gr1-treated NSG model thus provides a valuable tool for studying the mechanisms of wound healing, revascularization, inflammation, and human allograft rejection.

== Animal model of inflammatory bowel disease ==
The development and characterization of two humanized NSG (NOD/SCID/IL2rγnull) mouse models reconstituted with peripheral blood mononuclear cells (PBMCs) from patients with ulcerative colitis (NSG-UC) or Crohn's disease (NSG-CD), in order to better reflect the heterogeneity of inflammatory bowel diseases (IBD). In NSG-UC mice, ethanol challenge induces a strong pro-inflammatory response with edema, infiltration of CD4+ and CD8+ T cells, B cells, and monocytes into the mucosa, as well as moderate fibrosis. In contrast, NSG-CD mice spontaneously develop extensive fibrotic lesions, with collagen deposition between the muscular layers and fibroblast proliferation, without requiring chemical challenge. These models partially recapitulate the respective phenotypes of the two diseases, allow testing of therapeutics targeting human molecules, and may help stratify patients for personalized clinical trials.

== Notes ==
1.Mouse Genome Informatics entry for Prkdc^{scid}
2.Mouse Genome Informatics entry for Il2rg^{tm1Wjl}
