= Patient derived xenograft =

Model of cancer

Patient derived xenografts (PDX) are models of cancer where the tissue or cells from a patient's tumor are implanted into an immunodeficient or humanized mouse. It is a form of xenotransplantation. PDX models are used to create an environment that allows for the continued growth of cancer after its removal from a patient. In this way, tumor growth can be monitored in the laboratory, including in response to potential therapeutic options. Cohorts of PDX models can be used to determine the therapeutic efficiency of a therapy against particular types of cancer, or a PDX model from a specific patient can be tested against a range of therapies in a 'personalized oncology' approach.

== Methods of tumor xenotransplantation ==
Several types of immunodeficient mice can be used to establish PDX models: athymic nude mice, severely compromised immune deficient (SCID) mice, NOD-SCID mice, and recombination-activating gene 2 (Rag2)-knockout mice. The mice used must be immunocompromised to prevent transplant rejection. The NOD-SCID mouse is considered more immunodeficient than the nude mouse, and therefore is more commonly used for PDX models because the NOD-SCID mouse does not produce natural killer cells.

When human tumors are resected, necrotic tissues are removed and the tumor can be mechanically sectioned into smaller fragments, chemically digested, or physically manipulated into a single-cell suspension. There are advantages and disadvantages in utilizing either discrete tumor fragments or single-cell suspensions. Tumor fragments retain cell-cell interactions as well as some tissue architecture of the original tumor, therefore mimicking the tumor microenvironment. Alternatively, a single-cell suspension enables scientists to collect an unbiased sampling of the whole tumor, eliminating spatially segregate subclones that are otherwise inadvertently selected during analysis or tumor passaging. However, single-cell suspensions subject surviving cells to harsh chemical or mechanical forces that may sensitize cells to anoikis, taking a toll on cell viability and engraftment success.

=== Heterotopic and orthotopic implantation ===
Unlike creating xenograft mouse models using existing cancer cell lines, there are no intermediate in vitro processing steps before implanting tumor fragments into a murine host to create a PDX. The tumor fragments are either implanted heterotopically or orthotopically into an immunodeficient mouse. With heterotopic implantation, the tissue or cells are implanted into an area of the mouse unrelated to the original tumor site, generally subcutaneously or in subrenal capsular sites. The advantages of this method are the direct access for implantation, and ease of monitoring the tumor growth. With orthotopic implantation, scientists transplant the patient's tumor tissue or cells into the corresponding anatomical position in the mouse. Subcutaneous PDX models rarely produce metastasis in mice, nor do they simulate the initial tumor microenvironment, with engraftment rates of 40-60%. Subrenal capsular PDX maintains the original tumor stroma as well as the equivalent host stroma and has an engraftment rate of 95%. Ultimately, it takes about 2 to 4 months for the tumor to engraft varying by tumor type, implant location, and strain of immunodeficient mice utilized; engraftment failure should not be declared until at least 6 months. Researchers may use heterotopic implantation for the initial engraftment from the patient to the mouse, then use orthotopic implantation to implant the mouse-grown tumor into further generations of mice.

=== Generations of engraftments ===
The first generation of mice receiving the patient's tumor fragments are commonly denoted F0. When the tumor-burden becomes too large for the F0 mouse, researchers passage the tumor over to the next generation of mice. Each generation thereafter is denoted F1, F2, F3…Fn. For drug development studies, expansion of mice after the F3 generation is often utilized after ensuring that the PDX has not genetically or histologically diverged from the patient's tumor.

== Advantages over established cancer cell lines ==
Cancer cell lines are originally derived from patient tumors, but acquire the ability to proliferate within in vitro cell cultures. As a result of in vitro manipulation, cell lines that have been traditionally used in cancer research undergo genetic transformations that are not restored when cells are allowed to grow in vivo. Because of the cell culturing process, which includes enzymatic environments and centrifugation, cells that are better adapted to survive in culture are selected, tumor resident cells and proteins that interact with cancer cells are eliminated, and the culture becomes phenotypically homogeneous.

When implanted into immunodeficient mice, cell lines do not easily develop tumors and the result of any successfully grown tumor is a genetically divergent tumor unlike the heterogeneous patient tumor. Researchers are beginning to attribute the reason that only 5% of anti-cancer agents are approved by the Food and Drug Administration after pre-clinical testing to the lack of tumor heterogeneity and the absence of the human stromal microenvironment. Specifically, cell line-xenografts often are not predictive of the drug response in the primary tumors because cell lines do not follow pathways of drug resistance or the effects of the microenvironment on drug response found in human primary tumors.

Many PDX models have been successfully established for breast, prostate, colorectal, lung, and many other cancers because there are distinctive advantages when using PDX over cell lines for drug safety and efficacy studies as well as predicting patient tumor response to certain anti-cancer agents. Since PDX can be passaged without in vitro processing steps, PDX models allow the propagation and expansion of patient tumors without significant genetic transformation of tumor cells over multiple murine generations. Within PDX models, patient tumor samples grow in physiologically-relevant tumor microenvironments that mimic the oxygen, nutrient, and hormone levels that are found in the patient's primary tumor site. Furthermore, implanted tumor tissue maintains the genetic and epigenetic abnormalities found in the patient and the xenograft tissue can be excised from the patient to include the surrounding human stroma. As a result, numerous studies have found that PDX models exhibit similar responses to anti-cancer agents as seen in the actual patient who provided the tumor sample.

=== Humanized xenograft models ===
One prominent shortcoming of PDX models is that immunodeficient mice must be used to prevent immune attacks against the xenotransplanted tumor. With the immune system incapacitated, a critical component of the known tumor microenvironment interaction is foregone, preventing immunotherapies and anti-cancer agents that target the immune system components from being studied in PDX models. Researchers are beginning to explore the use of humanized-xenograft models to enable immune studies. Humanized-xenograft models are created by co-engrafting the patient tumor fragment and peripheral blood or bone marrow cells into a NOD/SCID mouse. The co-engraftment allows for reconstitution of the murine immune system, giving insight into the interactions between xenogenic human stroma and tumor environments in cancer progression and metastasis. However, these strategies have yet to be validated for most tumor types and there remain questions over whether the reconstituted immune system will behave in the same way as it does in the patient. For example, the immune system could be 'hyper-activated' due to exposure to mouse tissues in a similar fashion to graft versus host disease. Humanized-xenograft models for acute lymphoblastic leukemia and acute myeloid leukemia have been created.

== Clinical relevance ==
=== Breast cancer ===
The classification of genetic breast cancer subtypes, including triple-negative and HER2-positive subtypes, have allowed oncologists to use a patient's breast cancer subtype to personalize cancer therapy schedules. Utilizing PDX triple negative breast cancer models, scientists found that aurora kinase inhibitors slows tumor growth rate and suppresses recurrence in a breast cancer subtype that has a high recurrence rate and poor survivability. Scientists have also found that breast cancer PDX models are capable of predicting the prognosis of newly diagnosed women by observing the rate of tumor engraftment to determine if the patient tumor is aggressive. Breast cancer brain metastases affect younger women disproportionally, especially those lacking estrogen-receptor (ER), progesterone-receptor, and HER2 (known as triple-negative breast cancer, TNBC). Contreras-Zarate MJ et al. developed and characterized novel heterogeneous and clinically relevant human brain metastasis breast cancer PDXs (BM-PDXs) to study mechanisms of brain metastatic colonization, with the added benefit of a slower progression rate that makes them suitable for preclinical testing of drugs in therapeutic settings.

=== Colorectal cancer ===
Colorectal PDX models are relatively easy to establish and the models maintain genetic similarity of primary patient tumor for about 14 generations. In 2012, a study established 27 colorectal PDX models that did not diverge from their respective human tumors in histology, gene expression, or KRAS/BRAF mutation status. Due to their stability, the 27 colorectal PDX models may be able to serve as pre-clinical models in future drug studies. Drug resistance studies have been conducted using colorectal PDX models. In one study, researchers found that the models predicted patient responsiveness to cetuximab with 90% accuracy. Another study identified the amplification of ERBB2 as another mechanism of resistance, and a putative new actionable target in treatments.

=== Pancreatic cancer ===
Researchers initially focused on using pancreatic PDX models for drug studies to improve the process to develop predictive and pharmacodynamics end points for several molecularly targeted therapies. Other studies have been conducted to explore if pancreatic PDX models can be used to guide the ongoing treatment of advance pancreatic cancer patient by screening multiple drugs to select the drug with most activity as the next line of treatment. Pancreatic PDX models have shown anti-mesothilin CAR-T cells (T-cells modified with a chimeric antigen receptor) to suppress cancer growth.

=== Pediatric cancer (neuroblastoma) ===
Researchers have established neuroblastoma PDXs by orthotopic implantation of patient tumor explants into immunodeficient mice. The PDXs retained the genotype and phenotype of patient tumors, and exhibited substantial infiltrative growth and metastasis to distant organs including the bone marrow. The researchers cultured PDX-derived neuroblastoma cells in vitro and the cells retained tumorigenic and metastatic capacity in vivo.

=== Brain cancer (Glioblastoma) ===
PDX models of glioblastoma (GBM) have been essential for improving our understanding of the disease both in preclinical and translational research. In vitro cell culture models of glioblastoma, although valuable, can not fully replicate the complexity of the disease since there is a clear lack of the brain microenvironment and clonal selection. Orthotopic PDXs of GBM can be established through intracranial injections of tumor cells using a stereotactic frame. It has been shown that PDX models of GBM can recapitulate the histopathology, phenotypic properties and genetics of the parental patient tumor, highlighting the relevance of such models for GBM research.

== Challenges with PDX model adaptation ==
There are several challenges that scientists face when developing or using PDX models in research. For instance, not all tumor samples will successfully engraft in an immunodeficient mouse. When engraftment does occur, clinical study protocols are difficult to standardize if engraftment rates vary. There is also a possibility that the genetic complexity of the patients tumor is reduced during the initiation of PDX models, through a process known as genomic bottlenecking. Further, it is expensive to house mice, maintain histopathological cores for frequent testing, and perform ex vivo passaging of tumors in mice with high tumor burdens. The scientific community is trying to tackle these challenges mutualising efforts and exchanging models and expertise to avoid duplication: academic networks have sprung in Europe and USA, and the Horizon 2020 program is funding a new Research Infrastructure providing standardised services and resources, with the goal of improving reproducibility and open access to resources and services.

With regard to using PDX in personalized medicine, there are financial challenges. In the US, the cost to develop PDX models can potentially cost a patient thousands of dollars for treatment. PDX models can also take significant time to create, which may pose a challenge to patients with advanced stages of cancer. Despite these setbacks, the PDX market is expected to grow from a market capitalization of $77.4 million in 2017 to $167.6 million in 2022 due to growing demand for personalized medicine.
