= Severe combined immunodeficiency (non-human) =

Genetic disorder of animals

The severe combined immunodeficiency (SCID) is a severe immunodeficiency genetic disorder that is characterized by the complete inability of the adaptive immune system to mount, coordinate, and sustain an appropriate immune response, usually due to absent or atypical T and B lymphocytes. In humans, SCID is colloquially known as "bubble boy" disease, as victims may require complete clinical isolation to prevent lethal infection from environmental microbes.

Several forms of SCID occur in animal species. Not all forms of SCID have the same cause; different genes and modes of inheritance have been implicated in different species.

== Horses ==
Equine SCID is an autosomal recessive disorder that affects the Arabian horse. Similar to the "bubble boy" condition in humans, an affected foal is born with no immune system, and thus generally dies of an opportunistic infection, usually within the first four to six months of life. There is a DNA test that can detect healthy horses who are carriers of the gene causing SCID, thus testing and careful, planned matings can now eliminate the possibility of an affected foal ever being born.

SCID is one of six genetic diseases known to affect horses of Arabian bloodlines, and the only one of the six for which there is a DNA test to determine if a given horse is a carrier of the allele. The only known form of horse SCID involves mutation in DNA-PKcs.

Unlike SCID in humans, which can be treated, for horses, to date, the condition remains a fatal disease. When a horse is heterozygous for the gene, it is a carrier, but perfectly healthy and has no symptoms at all. If two carriers are bred together, however, classic Mendelian genetics indicate that there is a 50% chance of any given mating producing a foal that is a carrier heterozygous for the gene, and a 25% risk of producing a foal affected by the disease. If a horse is found to carry the gene, the breeder can choose to geld a male or spay a female horse so that they cannot reproduce, or they can choose to breed the known carrier only to horses that have been tested and found to be "clear" of the gene. In either case, careful breeding practices can avoid ever producing an SCID-affected foal.

== Dogs ==
There are two known types of SCID in dogs, an X chromosome-linked form that is very similar to X-SCID in humans, and an autosomal recessive form that is similar to the disease in Arabian horses and SCID mice.

X-SCID in dogs (caused by IL2RG mutation) is seen in Basset Hounds and Cardigan Welsh Corgis. Because it is an X-linked disease, females are carriers only and disease is seen in males exclusively. It is caused by a mutation in the gene for the cytokine receptor common gamma chain. Recurring infections are seen and affected animals usually do not live beyond three to four months. Characteristics include a poorly developed thymus gland, decreased T-lymphocytes and IgG, absent IgA, and normal quantities of IgM. A common cause of death is canine distemper, which develops following vaccination with a modified live distemper virus vaccine. Due to its similarity to X-SCID in humans, breeding colonies of affected dogs have been created in order to study the disease and test treatments, particularly bone marrow transplantation and gene therapy.

The autosomal recessive form of SCID has been identified in one line of Jack Russell Terriers. It is caused by a loss of DNA protein kinase (DNA-PKcs aka PRKDC), which leads to faulty V(D)J recombination. V(D)J recombination is necessary for recognition of a diverse range of antigens from bacteria, viruses, and parasites. It is characterized by nonfunctional T and B-lymphocytes and a complete lack of gammaglobulins. Death is secondary to infection. Differences between this disease and the form found in Bassets and Corgis include a complete lack of IgM and the presence of the disease in females.

== Mice ==
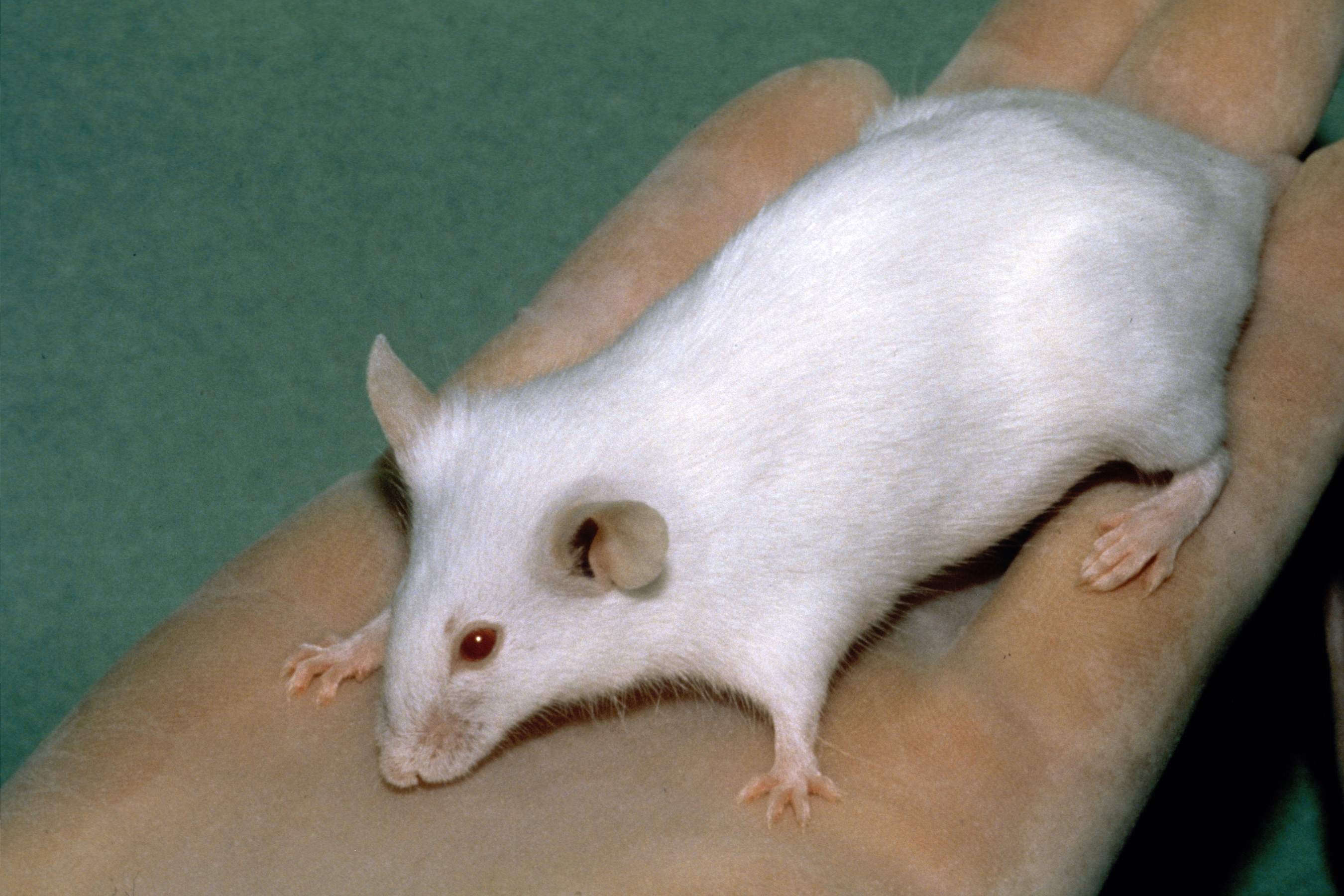
A close-up of white Severe combined immunodeficiency (SCID) mouse held by a human hand.

SCID mice are routinely used as model organisms for research into the basic biology of the immune system, cell transplantation strategies, and the effects of disease on mammalian systems. They have been extensively used as hosts for normal and malignant tissue transplants. In addition, they are useful for testing the safety of new vaccines or therapeutic agents in immunocompromised individuals.

The condition is due to a rare recessive mutation on Chromosome 16 responsible for deficient activity of an enzyme involved in DNA repair (Prkdc or "protein kinase, DNA activated, catalytic polypeptide"). Because V(D)J recombination does not occur, the humoral and cellular immune systems fail to mature. As a result, SCID mice have an impaired ability to make T or B lymphocytes, may not activate some components of the complement system, and cannot efficiently fight infections, nor reject tumors and transplants.

In addition to the natural mutation form, SCID in mice can also be created by a targeted knockout of Prkdc. Other human forms of SCID can similarly be mimicked by mutation in genes such as IL2RG (creating a form similar to X-linked SCID). By crossing SCID mice with these other mice, more severely immunocompromised strains can be created to further aid research (e.g. by being less likely to reject transplants). The degree to which the various components of the immune system are compromised varies according to what other mutations the mice carry along with the SCID mutation.

== Artificial models ==
In addition to the natural mutations above, humans have also engineered model organisms to have SCID.

- Two laboratory rat models were created in 2022, one having Prkdc knocked out, the other having both Prkdc and Rag2 knocked out.

== See also ==
- Severe combined immunodeficiency, for a detailed overview of the condition in humans and an in-depth scientific explanation of the disease
- Foal immunodeficiency syndrome
- Animal testing on rodents
