= Animal testing (disambiguation) =

Animal testing is the use of non-human animals in experiments that seek to control the variables that affect the behavior or biological system under study.

Animal testing may also refer to:

- Alternatives to animal testing
- Animal testing on invertebrates
- Animal testing on non-human primates
- Animal testing on rodents
- Animal testing regulations
- History of animal testing
- Testing cosmetics on animals
