= Oregon Primate Rescue =

American nonprofit organization

Oregon Primate Rescue (OPR) is a non-profit 501(c)(3) animal welfare organization that runs a 28-acre (110,000 m^{2}) sanctuary for non-human primates (NHPs) in Longview, Washington. Established in 1998, it takes care of NHPs who are orphaned, disabled, or who originate from private owners, laboratories, and government agencies. OPR educates the public on the difficulty of keeping NHPs as companion animals, and on the importance of preserving their natural habitats. The group's aim is to reduce the number of NHPs living in inappropriate conditions in the U.S. Polly Schultz is the founder and CEO.

OPR is licensed with the United States Department of Agriculture (USDA), registered with the Oregon Department of Justice, the Oregon Secretary of State, and is a non-profit member of the Dallas area Chamber of Commerce.

== See also ==
- Primatology
