= BPRC =

BPRC may refer to:

- Biomedical Primate Research Centre
- Byrd Polar Research Center
