= Testing cosmetics on animals =

Form of animal testing

Worldwide laws regarding testing cosmetics on animals: Nationwide ban on all cosmetic testing on animals / Partial ban on cosmetic testing on animals^{1}; Ban on the sale of cosmetics tested on animals / No ban on any cosmetic testing on animals; Unknown^{1}Some methods of testing are excluded from the ban or the laws vary within the country.

Cosmetic testing on animals is a type of animal testing used to test the safety and hypoallergenic properties of cosmetic products for use by humans.

Since this type of animal testing is often harmful to the animal subjects, it is opposed by animal rights activists and others. Cosmetic animal testing is banned in many parts of the world, including Colombia, the European Union, the United Kingdom, India, and Norway.

Cosmetics that have been produced without any testing on animals are sometimes known as "cruelty-free cosmetics". Some popular cruelty-free beauty brands include E.L.F., Charlotte Tilbury, Farsali, Fenty Beauty, Fenty Skin, Glow Recipe and others. The website "Cruelty-Free Kitty" was created to assess which brands are cruelty-free. Furthermore, some brands have participated in animal testing in the past, however, if they currently do not test on animals, these cosmetics are considered "cruelty-free".

== Definition ==
Using animal testing in the development of cosmetics may involve testing either a finished product or the individual ingredients of a finished product on animals, often rabbits, as well as mice, rats, monkeys, dogs, guinea pigs and other animals. Cosmetics can be defined as products applied to the body to enhance the body's appearance or to cleanse the body. This includes all hair products, makeup, and skin products.

The United States Food and Drug Administration (FDA) continues to endorse animal testing methods.

Re-using existing test data obtained from previous animal testing is generally not considered to be cosmetic testing on animals; however, the acceptability of this to opponents of testing is inversely proportional to how recent the data is.

== Methods ==
Methods of testing cosmetics on animals include various tests that are categorized differently based on which areas the cosmetics will be used for. One new ingredient in any cosmetic product used in these tests could lead to the deaths of at least 1,400 animals.

Dermal penetration: Rats are mostly used in this method that analyzes chemical movement, through the penetration of the chemical into the bloodstream. Dermal penetration is a method that creates a better understanding of skin absorption.

Skin sensitization: This is a method that tests for allergic reactions to different chemicals. In some tests, a chemical adjuvant is injected to boost the immune system, which was typically performed on guinea pigs. In some tests, no chemical adjuvant is injected with the test chemical, or the chemical is applied on a shaved patch of skin. The reaction is then recorded by the appearance of the skin afterward.

Acute toxicity: This test is used to determine the danger of exposure to a chemical by mouth, skin, or inhalation. It shows the various dangerous effects of a substance that result from a short period of exposure. Large amounts of rats and mice are injected in Lethal Dose 50 (LD50) tests that continue until half of the test subjects die. Other tests can use a smaller number of animals but can cause convulsions, loss of motor function, and seizures. The animals are often then killed afterward to gather information about the internal effects of the chemicals.

Draize test: This is a method of testing that may cause irritation or corrosion to the skin or eye on animals, dermal sensitization, airway sensitization, endocrine disruption, and LD_{50} (which refers to the lethal dose which kills 50% of the treated animals).

Skin corrosivity or irritation: This method of the test assesses the potential of a substance causing irreversible damage to the skin. It is typically performed on rabbits and involves putting chemicals on a shaved patch of skin. This determines the level of damage to the skin including itching, inflammation, swelling, etc.

== Alternatives ==
A variety of alternatives exists to of animal testing. Cosmetics manufacturers who do not test on animals may use in vitro screens to test for endpoints that can determine the potential risk to humans with very high sensitivity and specificity. Companies such as CeeTox in the USA, acquired by Cyprotex, specialize in such testing and organizations like the Center for Alternatives to Animal Testing (CAAT), PETA and many other organizations advocate the use of in vitro and other non-animal tests in the development of consumer products.

Using safe ingredients from a list of 5,000 that have already been tested in conjunction with modern methods of cosmetics testing, the need for tests using animals is negated.

EpiSkin, EpiDerm, SkinEthic and BioDEpi are lab-made reconstructed artificial human skin models that are non-animal alternative testing platforms with histological similarity with native skin tissues. Artificial skin can imitate the actual human skin, on which cosmetic products can be tested. For example, using UV light on EpiSkin can cause it to resemble older skin and adding melanocytes will turn the skin a darker color. This helped create a spectrum of different skin colors that are then used to compare the results of sunblock on a different variety of people. To address potential issues with other parts of the human body, research companies such as NOTOX have developed a synthetic model of the human liver, which is the main organ to detox the body, to test harmful ingredients and chemicals to see if the liver can detox those elements.

Lab-grown tissues are now being used to test chemicals in makeup products. MatTek is one of the companies that do this. It sells small amounts of skin cells to companies to test their products on them. Some of these companies are those that make laundry detergent, makeup, toilet bowl cleaner, anti-aging creams, and tanning lotion. Without these tissues, companies would be testing their products on living animals. Lab-grown tissues are a great alternative to testing harmful products on animals. One lab was able to grow 11 different types of tissues in a petri dish. The downfall was that the tissues were not fully functional on their own, in fact, many of these tissues only resembled tiny parts of an actual-sized human organ, most of which were too small to transplant into humans. This technology could potentially be great, but it was a major downfall, 'Ministomachs that took about nine weeks to cultivate in a petri dish formed "oval-shaped, hollow structures".

Research companies can also use body parts and organs taken from animals slaughtered for the meat industry to perform tests such as the Bovine Corneal Opacity and Permeability Test and Isolated Chicken Eye Test.

Many companies have not made the switch to cruelty-free testing yet for many reasons, one of them being the time it takes for lab-grown tissues to be useable. Animals, on the other hand, can mature quickly. Rats, for example, have a much quicker growth rate "From birth to adult, rats take about three weeks to mature and begin fending for themselves. The rodents reach sexual maturity in about five weeks and begin mating soon after to produce the next generation to start the rat life cycle over again". On top of the extremely short time it takes a rat to mature, they have a complete set of organ systems, not just a paper-thin sheet of cells. Rats can also reproduce, and they do so at a very fast pace. "In general, rats produce about seven offspring per litter, which can at times reach up to 14. Typical gestation periods last only a few weeks, allowing each female rat to produce around five litters a year".

== History ==
The first known tests on animals were done as early as 300 BC. "Writings of ancient civilizations all document the use of animal testing. These civilizations, led by men like Aristotle and Erasistratus, used live animals to test various medical procedures". This testing was important because it led to new discoveries such as how blood circulated and the fact that living beings needed air to survive. The idea of taking an animal and comparing it to how human beings survived was a completely new idea. It would not have existed (at least not as quickly as it did) without our ancestors studying animals and how their bodies worked.

"Proving the germ theory of disease was the crowning achievement of the French scientist Louis Pasteur. He was not the first to propose that diseases were caused by microscopic organisms, but the view was controversial in the 19th century and opposed the accepted theory of 'spontaneous generation'". The idea of germs and other microscopic organisms was an entirely new idea and would not have come to be without the use of animals. In 1665, scientists Robert Hooke and Antoni van Leeuwenhoek discovered and studied how germs worked. They published a book about their discovery, which was not accepted by very many people, including the science community, at first. After some time, scientists were able to give animals diseases from microbes and realized that microbes really did exist. From there, they were able to use animals to understand how the disease worked, and the effects it could potentially have on the human body.

All of this has led up to something a bit more recent, the use of animals to test beauty products. This has become a very controversial topic in recent years. There are various people who are extremely against the use of animals for this purpose, and for a good reason. "Typically, animal tests for cosmetics include skin and eye irritation tests where chemicals are rubbed onto the shaved skin or dripped into the eyes of rabbits; repeated oral force-feeding studies lasting weeks or months to look for signs of general illness or specific health hazards, such as cancer or birth defects; and even widely condemned "lethal dose" tests, in which animals are forced to swallow massive amounts of a test chemical to determine the dose that causes death". This kind of testing can be vital in finding important information about products, but can be harmful to the animals it is tested on.

In 1937, a mistake was made that ended up changing the pharmaceutical industry drastically. A company created a medicine (elixir sulfanilamide) "to treat streptococcal infections", and without any scientific research the medicine was out on shelves. This medicine turned out to be extremely poisonous to people, leading to large poisoning outbreaks followed by over 100 deaths. This epidemic led to a law being passed in 1938, called the U.S. Federal Food, Drug, and Cosmetic Act, enforcing more rigorous guidelines on cosmetic products. After this law was passed, companies looked to animals to test their products, in turn, creating the first encounters of cosmetic animal testing.

== Non-profit organizations ==
This "Leaping Bunny" indicates that cosmetic products with this logo have not been tested on animals.

- Cruelty Free International: Cruelty Free International and its partners manage the certification of all the companies across the world looking to be cruelty-free. Companies producing beauty and household products which do not test their products on animals for any market can request membership of The Leaping Bunny Program, which allows that company to feature Cruelty Free International's Leaping Bunny logo on their products. This program sets global standard of operations and sales. Companies headquartered internationally can obtain certification from Cruelty Free International. Companies headquartered in the United States and Canada can obtain certification from The Coalition for Consumer Information on Cosmetics (CCIC). In 2013, over 500 companies were certified. However, some companies' certifications were revoked after it was discovered they continued to test on animals in Asia.
- Humane Society International: This is a global animal protection organization that works to help all animals—including animals in laboratories. This organization promotes human-animal interaction to tackle the existence of all cruelty that innocent animals experience.
- PETA: PETA certifies cosmetics and beauty products as free from animal testing, or as "cruelty-free" (free from animal testing and also vegan).

== Procedures of animal testing ==
There is a strategy used in animal testing laboratories titled the 'Three R's:' Reduction, refinement, and replacement' (Doke, "Alternatives to Animal Testing: A Review").

- Replacement: This provides the opportunity to study the response of cellular models, but in other words, replacement searches for alternatives that could be done rather than testing on animal subjects.
- Reduction: This approach is built upon the ethics to have a minimal number of animal subjects being tested on for current and later tests.
- Refinement: This suggests that the planned distress and pain caused to an animal subject be as little as possible. This approach focuses on making a home for the animals before entering testing grounds to elongate the life of laboratory animals. Discomfort in animals causes an imbalance in hormonal levels which creates fluctuating results during testing.

== Legal requirements and status ==
Due to the strong public backlash against cosmetic testing on animals, most cosmetic manufacturers say their products are not tested on animals. However, they are still required by trading standards and consumer protection laws in most countries to show their products are not toxic and not dangerous to public health. They also need to show that the ingredients are not dangerous in large quantities, such as when in transport or in the manufacturing plant. In some countries, it is possible to meet these requirements without any further tests on animals. Other countries, may require animal testing to meet legal requirements. The United States and Japan are frequently criticized for their insistence on stringent safety measures, which often require animal testing.

Some retailers distinguish themselves in the marketplace by their stance on animal testing.

=== Legal requirements in Japan ===
Although Japanese law does not require non-medicated cosmetics to be tested on animals, it does not prohibit it either, leaving the decision to individual companies. Animal testing is required when the product contains newly-developed tar colours , ultraviolet ray protective ingredients or preservatives, and when the amount of any ingredient regulated in terms of how much can be added is increased.

Japanese brands such as Shiseido and Mandom have ended much, but not all, of their animal testing. However, most other leading cosmetics companies in Japan still test on animals.

=== Jurisdictions with bans ===
==== Brazil, São Paulo ====
São Paulo in Brazil banned cosmetic animal testing in 2014.

==== Canada ====
In June 2023, the Government of Canada banned the testing of cosmetics on animals, and the sale of cosmetics tested on animals. Amendments to the Food and Drugs Act to end cosmetic animal testing through Bill C-47, the Budget Implementation Act, 2023, No. 1, went into effect on 22 December 2023.

==== Colombia ====
In June 2020, the Senate of the Republic of Colombia approved a resolution banning the commercialization and testing of cosmetics on animals. In August 2020, presidential assent was granted to the resolution, thus effectively banning the testing of cosmetics on animals in Colombia.

==== European Union ====
The European Union (EU) followed suit, after it agreed to phase in a near-total ban on the sale of animal-tested cosmetics throughout the EU from 2009, and to ban cosmetics-related animal testing. Animal testing is regulated in EC Regulation 1223/2009 on cosmetics. Imported cosmetics ingredients tested on animals were phased out for EU consumer markets in 2013 by the ban, but can still be sold to outside of the EU. Norway banned cosmetics animal testing at the same time as the EU. In May 2018, the European Parliament voted for the EU and its Member States to work towards a UN convention against the use of animal testing for cosmetics.

==== European Free Trade Association ====
The four EFTA countries that are not in the EU, i.e. Norway, Liechtenstein, Switzerland, and Iceland, also banned cosmetic testing.

==== Guatemala ====
In 2017, Guatemala banned cosmetic animal testing.

==== India ====
In early 2014, India announced a ban on testing cosmetics on animals in the country, thereby becoming the second country in Asia to do so. Later India banned import of cosmetics tested on animals in November 2014.

==== Israel ====
Israel banned "the import and marketing of cosmetics, toiletries, or detergents that were tested on animals" in 2013.

==== New Zealand ====
In 2015, New Zealand also banned animal testing. However, the ban on testing cosmetics on animals was unlikely to lead to products being stripped from shelves in New Zealand, as around 90 percent of cosmetic products sold in New Zealand were made overseas.

==== Taiwan ====
In 2015, Taiwan launched a bill proposing a ban on cosmetic testing on animals. It passed in 2016 and went into effect in 2019. Shortly before the ban went into effect on 9 November 2019, however, it was noted that most Taiwan cosmetic companies already did not experiment with animals.

==== Turkey ====
Turkey "banned any animal testing for cosmetic products that have already been introduced to the market."

==== UK ====
Animal testing on cosmetics or their ingredients was banned in the UK in 1998.

=== Jurisdictions where prohibitions are considered ===
==== Association of Southeast Asian Nations ====
The Association of Southeast Asian Nations (ASEAN) is potentially "making strides toward ending cosmetics testing on animals."

==== Australia ====
In Australia, the End Cruel Cosmetics Bill was introduced to Parliament in March 2014, which would ban local testing, which generally does not happen there, and importation of cosmetics tested on animals. In 2016 a bill was passed to ban the sale of cosmetics tested on animals, which came into effect in July 2017.

==== United States ====
In March 2014, the Humane Cosmetics Act was introduced to the U.S. Congress. It would ban cosmetic testing on animals and eventually would ban the sale of cosmetics tested on animals. The bill did not advance.

Similar bills have been introduced and passed at the state level, and testing cosmetics on animals has been banned in ten US states as of 2023: California, Nevada, Illinois, Hawaii, Maryland, Maine, New Jersey, Virginia, Louisiana, and New York.

==== Mexico ====
On 19 March 2020, the Mexican Senate unanimously passed legislation banning testing cosmetics on animals. The proposed ban now awaits approval from the lower house of the Mexican Congress, the Mexican Chamber of Deputies.

==== South Korea ====
South Korea is also potentially "making strides toward ending cosmetics testing on animals."

=== Other statuses ===
==== China ====
China passed a law on 30 June 2014 to eliminate the requirement for animal testing of cosmetics. Though domestically-produced ordinary cosmetic goods do not require testing, animal testing is still mandated by law for Chinese-made "cosmeceuticals" (cosmetic goods which make a functional claim) which are available for sale in China. Cosmetics intended solely for export are exempt from the animal testing requirement. As of March 2019, post-market testing (i.e. tests on cosmetics after they hit the market) for finished imported and domestically produced cosmetic products will no longer require animal testing. Chinese law was further amended in April 2020, fully dropping all remaining mandatory animal testing requirements for all cosmetics - both locally produced and imported, instead creating a regulatory 'preference' for non-animal based testing methods in the safety certification of cosmetic products.

==== Russia ====
In 2013, the Russian Ministry of Health stated "Toxicological testing is performed by means of testing for skin allergic reaction or test on mucous tissue/eye area (with use of lab animals) or by use of alternative general toxicology methods (IN VITRO). In this manner the technical regulations include measures which provide an alternative to animal testing".

== See also ==
- Animal testing on invertebrates
- Animal testing on non-human primates
- Animal testing on rodents
- Cosmetics
- Veterinary ethics
