= Animal testing on invertebrates =

Overview article

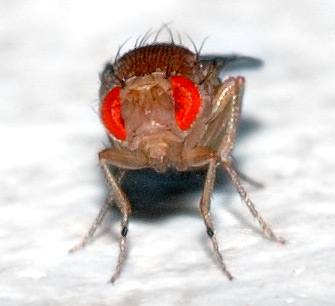
Drosophila melanogaster is commonly used for animal experimentation.

Most animal testing involves invertebrates, especially Drosophila melanogaster, a fruit fly, and Caenorhabditis elegans, a nematode. These animals offer scientists many advantages over vertebrates, including their short life cycle, simple anatomy and the ease with which large numbers of individuals may be studied. Invertebrates are often cost-effective, as thousands of flies or nematodes can be housed in a single room.

With the exception of some cephalopods in the European Union, invertebrate species are not protected under most animal research legislation, and therefore the total number of invertebrates used remains unknown.

== Main uses ==
Research on invertebrates is the foundation for current understanding of the genetics of animal development. C. elegans is especially valuable as the precise lineage of all the organism's 959 somatic cells is known, giving a complete picture of how this organism goes from a single cell in a fertilized egg, to an adult animal. The genome of this nematode has also been fully sequenced and any one of these genes can easily be inactivated through RNA interference, by feeding the worms antisense RNA. A major success in the work on C. elegans was the discovery that particular cells are programmed to die during development, leading to the discovery that programmed cell death is an active process under genetic control. The simple nervous system of this nematode allows the effects of genetics on the development of nerves to be studied in detail. However, the lack of an adaptive immune system and the simplicity of its organs prevent C. elegans from being used in medical research such as vaccine development.

The fly D. melanogaster is the most widely used animal in genetic studies. This comes from the simplicity of breeding and housing the flies, which allows large numbers to be used in experiments. Molecular biology is relatively simple in these organisms and a huge variety of mutant and genetically modified flies have been developed. Fly genetics has been vital in the study of development, the cell cycle, behavior, and neuroscience. The similarities in the basic biochemistry of all animals allows flies to be used as simple systems to investigate the genetics of conditions such as heart disease and neurodegenerative disease. However, like nematodes, D. melanogaster is not widely used in applied medical research, as the fly immune system differs greatly from that found in humans, and diseases in flies can be very different from diseases in humans.

Other uses of invertebrates include studies on social behavior.

== See also ==
- Animal testing on non-human primates
- Animal testing on rodents
- Testing cosmetics on animals
- Pain in invertebrates
