= Animal model of ischemic stroke =

Animal models of ischemic stroke are procedures inducing cerebral ischemia. The aim is the study of basic processes or potential therapeutic interventions in this disease, and the extension of the pathophysiological knowledge on and/or the improvement of medical treatment of human ischemic stroke. Ischemic stroke has a complex pathophysiology involving the interplay of many different cells and tissues such as neurons, glia, endothelium, and the immune system. These events cannot be mimicked satisfactorily in vitro yet. Thus a large portion of stroke research is conducted on animals.

== Overview ==
Several models in different species are currently known to produce cerebral ischemia. Global ischemia models, both complete and incomplete, tend to be easier to perform. However, they are less immediately relevant to human stroke than the focal stroke models, because global ischemia is not a common feature of human stroke. However, in various settings global ischemia is also relevant, e.g. in global anoxic brain damage due to cardiac arrest. Different species also vary in their susceptibility to the various types of ischemic insults. An example is gerbils. They do not have a Circle of Willis and stroke can be induced by common carotid artery occlusion alone.

== Mechanisms of inducing ischemic stroke ==
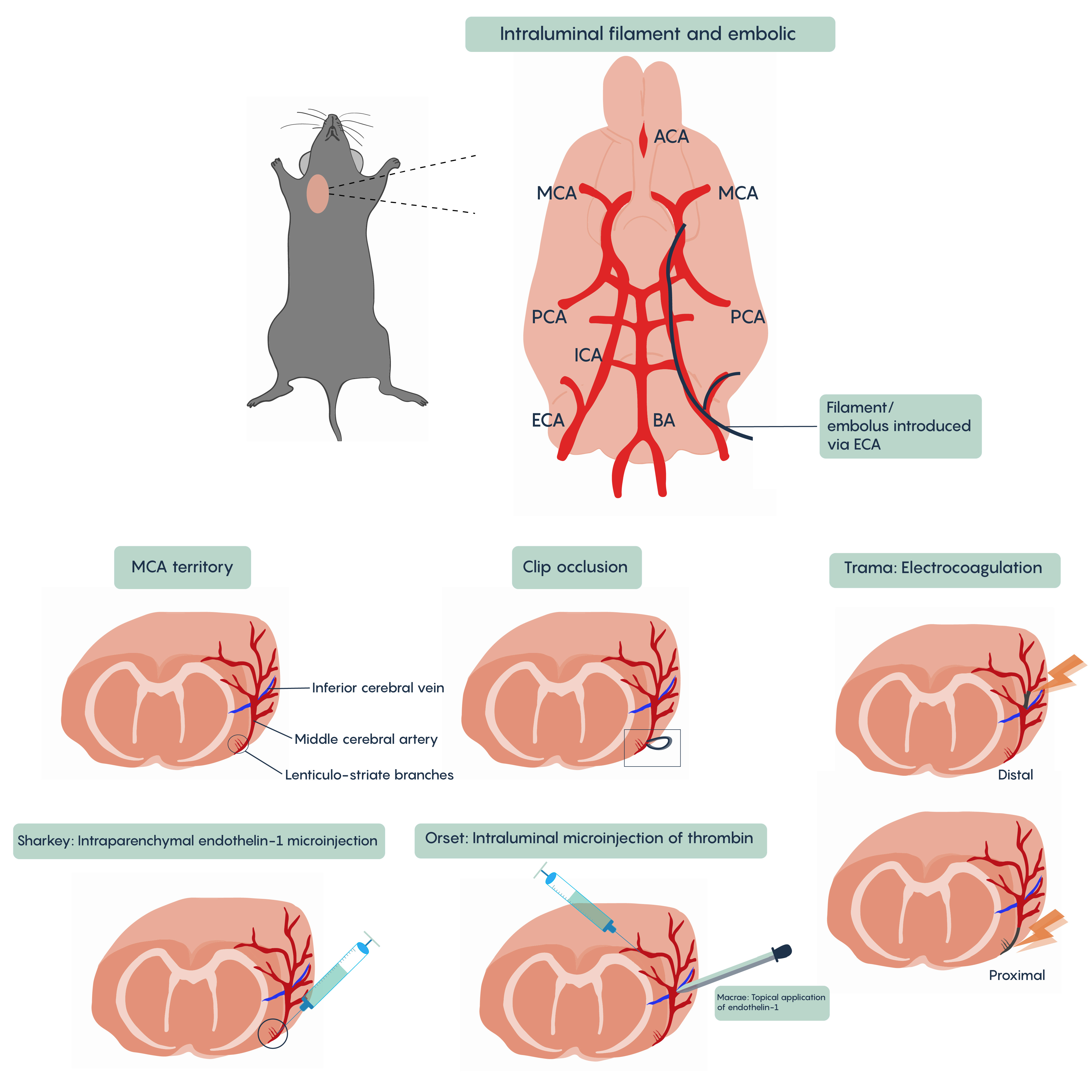
Some animal models of ischemic stroke in mice

Some of the mechanisms which have been used are:

- Complete global ischemia
  - Decapitation
  - Aorta/vena cava occlusion
  - External neck tourniquet or cuff
  - Cardiac arrest
- Incomplete global ischemia
  - Hemorrhage or hypotension
  - Hypoxic ischemia
  - Intracranial hypertension and common carotid artery occlusion
  - Two-vessel occlusion and hypotension
  - Four-vessel occlusion
  - Unilateral common carotid artery occlusion (in some species only)
- Focal cerebral ischemia
  - Endothelin-1-induced constriction of arteries and veins
  - Middle cerebral artery occlusion
  - Spontaneous brain infarction (in spontaneously hypertensive rats)
  - Macrosphere embolization
- Multifocal cerebral ischemia
  - Blood clot embolization
  - Microsphere embolization
  - Photothrombosis

== Hypoxic Ischemia models ==
One of the most commonly used animal models of hypoxic ischemia was originally described by Levine in 1960 and later refined by Rice et al., in 1981. This approach is useful to study hypoxic ischemia in the developing brain, since newborn rat pups are utilized in this model. Briefly, 7 day old rat pups undergo a permanent unilateral carotid artery ligation with a subsequent 3 hour exposure to a hypoxic environment (8% oxygen). This model creates a unilateral infarct in the hemisphere ipsilateral to the ligation, since the hypoxia alone is subthreshold for injury at this age. The area of injury is typically concentrated in periventricular regions of the brain, especially cortical and hippocampal areas.

== Focal ischemia models ==
They are divided into techniques including reperfusion of the ischemic tissue (transient focal cerebral ischemia) and those without reperfusion (permanent focal cerebral ischemia). The following models are established:

- Endothelin-1 -induced constriction of arteries and veins
- Middle cerebral artery occlusion (MCAO)
  - MCAO avoiding craniotomy
    - Embolic middle cerebral artery occlusion
    - Endovascular filament middle cerebral artery occlusion (transient or permanent)
  - MCAO involving craniotomy
    - Permanent transcranial middle cerebral artery occlusion
    - Transient transcranial middle cerebral artery occlusion
- Direct tissue damage
  - Cerebrocortical photothrombosis

=== Endothelin-1 -induced constriction of arteries and veins ===
Endothelin-1 is a potent vasoconstrictor which is produced endogenously during ischemic stroke and which contributes to overall loss of cells and disability. Exogenous endothelin-1 can also be used to induce stroke and cell death after sustained vasoconstriction with reperfusion. It can be microinjected to induce focal stroke in small tissue volumes (e.g., cortical grey matter, white matter or subcortical tissue) or after injection near the Middle cerebral artery. It is often used as a model of focal stroke to evaluate candidate pro-regenerative therapies. One advantage of this model of stroke is that it causes highly reproducible infarcts. Another benefit is that it can be used in elderly rats with only very low resulting mortality.

=== Embolic middle cerebral artery occlusion ===
Middle cerebral artery (MCA) occlusion is achieved in this model by injecting particles like blood clots (thrombembolic MCAO) or artificial spheres into the carotid artery of animals as an animal model of ischemic stroke. Thrombembolic MCAO is achieved either by injecting clots that were formed in vitro, or by endovascular instillation of thrombin for in situ clotting. The thromboembolic model is closest to the pathophysiology of human cardioembolic stroke. When injecting spheres into the cerebral circulation, their size determines the pattern of brain infarction: Macrospheres (300–400 μm) induce infarcts similar to those achieved by occlusion of the proximal MCA, whereas microsphere (~ 50 μm) injection results in distal, diffuse embolism. However, the quality of MCAO – and thus the volume of brain infarcts – is very variable, a fact which is further aggravated by a certain rate of spontaneous lysis of injected blood clots.

=== Endovascular filament middle cerebral artery occlusion ===
The technique of endovascular filament (intraluminal suture) MCAO as an animal model of ischemic stroke was first described by Koizumi in 1986. It is applied to rats and mice. A piece of surgical filament is introduced into the internal carotid artery and forwarded until the tip occludes the origin of the middle cerebral artery, resulting in a cessation of blood flow and subsequent brain infarction in its area of supply. If the suture is removed after a certain interval, reperfusion is achieved (transient MCAO); if the filament is left in place the procedure is suitable as model of permanent MCAO, too. The most common modification of this technique is based on Longa et al. (1989), in which a filament is introduced via the external carotid artery. This approach allows the access point to be closed while preserving blood supply via the common and internal carotid arteries to the brain after the removal of the filament. Known pitfalls of this method are insufficient occlusion, subarachnoid hemorrhage, hyperthermia, and necrosis of the ipsilateral extracranial tissue. Filament MCAO is not applicable to all rat strains.

=== Permanent transcranial middle cerebral artery occlusion ===
In this animal model of ischemic stroke the middle cerebral artery (MCA) is surgically dissected and subsequently permanently occluded, e.g. by electrocautery or ligation. Occlusion can be performed on the proximal or distal part of the MCA. In the latter, ischemic damage is restricted to the cerebral cortex. MCAO can be combined with temporal or permanent common carotid artery occlusion. These models require a small craniotomy.

=== Transient transcranial middle cerebral artery occlusion ===
The technique of modeling ischemic stroke by transient transcranial MCAO is similar to that of permanent transcranial MCAO, with the MCA being reperfused after a defined period of focal cerebral ischemia. Like permanent MCAO, craniotomy is required and common carotid artery (CCA) occlusion can be combined. Occluding one MCA and both CCAs is referred to as the three vessel occlusion model of focal cerebral ischemia.

=== Cerebrocortical photothrombosis ===
Photothrombotic models of ischemic stroke use local intravascular photocoagulation of circumscribed cortical areas. After intravenous injection of photosensitive dyes like rose-bengal, the brain is irradiated through the skull via a small hole or a thinned cranial window, leading to photochemical occlusion of the irradiated vessels with secondary tissue ischemia. Initially proposed by Rosenblum and El-Sabban in 1977, this approach was refined for the rat brain by Watson et al. in 1985 and has since been adapted for use in mice.

== See also ==
- animal models of stroke
