= National Primate Research Exhibition Hall =

Proposed animal rights museum in the U.S.

The National Primate Research Exhibition Hall (NPRX) was a proposed animal rights museum spearheaded by the Primate Freedom Project, an Atlanta, Georgia-based nonprofit organisation, which sought to establish the hall in Madison, Wisconsin, United States. The project aimed to display exhibits, art, and educational displays regarding the controversial issue of non-human primate experimentation. The museum was never opened; the property dispute with the University of Wisconsin–Madison was ultimately resolved in the university's favour, with the university acquiring the property.

== Proposed location ==
The proposed location of NPRX has stirred local controversy in Madison. The address of the Exhibition Hall would be 26 N. Charter St., which is only a few feet from the Harry Harlow Primate Psychology Laboratory and the Wisconsin National Primate Research Center. These are two primate labs affiliated with the University of Wisconsin–Madison. Together these labs hold approximately 1,586 primates for scientific research, comprising rhesus macaques, common marmosets, and cynomolgus macaques.

After the project to create the Exhibition Hall was announced, the University of Wisconsin–Madison responded by making an offer on the property in the amount of $1,000,000. The university intends to use the property to expand their primate laboratory facilities. The current property owner is attempting to sell the property to the university, despite prior promises and written agreements with animal rights activists to use the property for its original purpose.

On Monday November 27, 2006, Wisconsin District Court Judge Sarah O'Brien issued a ruling in favor of the activists, stating the original contract Charly signed was binding. She ordered Charly to convey the property to the activists and awarded them compensation for their legal fees. Attorneys for Charly and UW spokespeople stated the decision would be appealed. Rick Bogle, founder of the Primate Freedom Project, stated they intend to legally defend their rights to the property and to open the planned museum: "The university ... will probably be embarrassed to have the [animal rights] debate take place at the steps where this is going on," Bogle said. "They will probably try to delay this every step of the way."

Joseph Kemnitz, director of the Wisconsin National Primate Research Center, stated disappointment in the judge's decision, and characterized the PFP's efforts as "an unexpected opportunity for them to cause trouble." In an interview with a campus paper, UW Associate Vice Chancellor Alan Fish called the contested property "absolutely critical" to the future of primate research at UW."

The UW intends to still pursue acquiring this property for expansion, and has not ruled out the use of condemnation and eminent domain to forcefully acquire the property.

== Subsequent developments ==
Following the November 2006 ruling, the University of Wisconsin–Madison pursued further legal action to challenge the decision. The university subsequently acquired the property at 26 N. Charter St. after reportedly paying seller Roger Charly $1 million, effectively ending the prospect of the Exhibition Hall opening at that location. The Primate Freedom Project has not announced an alternative site for the proposed museum, and the project appears to have been discontinued.

== See also ==
- International trade in primates
- Non-human primate experiments
