= Animal model of stroke =

A surgical approach to the proximal middle cerebral artery. Placement of a straight mini aneurysm that produces temporary artery occlusion.

Hippocrates historically described stroke with symptoms such as paralysis and convulsions, which were described as apoplexy. Early treatments for stroke involved bloodletting (taking blood out of the vascular system), which targeted the symptoms, but it did not help with the real causes. As medical research on the topic gets us further into the knowledge, scholars like Thomas Willis and Jakob Wepfer gave us a deeper understanding of the pathophysiological changes that stroke could cause, and this research by both scholars was the reason for a more advanced knowledge and modern medical application for the illness.

Stroke is considered a high rate of mortality, where the animal model of stroke is considered a heterogeneous illness due to the similar characteristics of human stroke, where rats are the main rodent used for testing. Their purpose aligns with the modern shift toward understanding disease mechanisms and improving diagnosis, classification, treatment, and prevention of stroke. In essence, historically, the move to study causes for better treatments mimics the same approach used in animal models, aiming to gain a deeper understanding of the observations and interventions employed in these models.

== Classification by cause ==
The term "stroke" subsumes cerebrovascular disorders of diverse etiologies, which in turn feature diverse pathophysiological processes. Thus, for each stroke etiology, one or more animal models have been developed:

- Animal models of ischemic stroke: It causes severe brain damage due to sudden stop of blood flow, this loss then creates an infarct core which surrounded the penumbra of salvageable tissue, then it is targeted by neuroprotective treatments and strategies to be able to enhance a better therapy development; where preclinical models for older animals and with related health problems like hypertension, diabetes, obesity, and hyperlipidemia were needed. Aged and comorbid animal conditions are adequate for developing human treatments for better health.
- Animal models of intracerebral hemorrhage(ICH): It is considered a severe and non-traumatic type of stroke that affects ~2 million people around the world each year. This illness is the most serious type of stroke and still the least studied case. The sickness causes bleeding in the brain tissue, and it can extend to the brain ventricles, where an inflammatory and cell-death response is triggered. These responses activate enzymes that release cytokines, leukocytes begin migrating, where tissue breakdown and repair occur.
- Animal models of subarachnoid hemorrhage and cerebral vasospasm(SAH): Prior research on SAH and cerebral vasospasm used mechanical, histological, and pharmacological approaches in larger animals (dogs, cats, and monkeys). The clinical trial investigates whether rats are suitable for the research, focusing on time resolution, induction, and vasospasm. This investigation experiment showed a mortality rate of around 26%, with respiratory problems during the first 48 hours as the main issue, and survivors recovered without problems over the next three- days. The SAH induction methods mimic natural aneurysmal rupture; SAH is an experimental precision because it can be controlled and analyzed.
- Animal models of sinus vein thrombosis: It is a rare type of venous thromboembolism (VTE) that predominantly affects around 1% of stroke cases and commonly affects young adults. Risk factors for CVST include VTE, infections, tumors, or cranial trauma. This illness can cause thrombosis, edema, ischemia, and hemorrhage in the brain. Given the array of causes, diagnosis can be difficult because of limited understanding of CVST pathophysiology and treatment options; animal models are essential for this type of research due to their similarities to the human condition.

== Overview of Primary Animal Model Types ==
- Induced Animal Models: A method used on healthy animals through a series of procedures, such as physical, chemical, genetic, or surgical. This model is applied to those test subjects by artificially inducing a disease or condition. This model simulates aspects of human diseases under research in a controlled setting. Examples of induced research include diabetes mellitus, which is caused in rodents by using streptozotocin or alloxan; hypertension induced by surgical manipulation in which the renal artery is constricted; and Parkinson's disease, which is induced by using neurotoxins in primates like MPTP.
- Spontaneous Animal Models: In this model, mouse studies were done to investigate the natural occurrence of illnesses, such as obesity, diabetes, hypertension, and autoimmune diseases like lupus.
- Negative Animal Models: These models involve animals that do not develop a specific disease or response under conditions that would typically induce them. Examples of these animals include rabbits, which are resistant to gonococcal infections. This method is less common and more complex to interpret, and it is deemed unsuitable for modeling the progression of illnesses.
- Orphan Animal Models: These are naturally occurring animal diseases that are termed "orphan" until similar conditions are later found in humans.

== Transferability of animal results to human stroke ==
Although multiple therapies have proven to be effective in animals, only very few have done so in human patients. Reasons for this are:

- Side effects: Many highly potent neuroprotective drugs display side effects that inhibit the application of effective doses in patients (e.g., MK-801).
- Delay: Whereas in animal studies the time of incidence onset is known and therapy can be started early, patients often present with delay and unclear time of symptom onset.
- Age and associated illnesses: Some experimental studies conducted on healthy and young animals were elaborated in a control lab setting. For some reasons, a typical patient prone to stroke is elderly patients with a big gap of risk factors and complications due to other illnesses, for example, diabetes, hypertension, and heart diseases.
  - Morphological and functional differentiations between the brains of humans and animals: The basic mechanisms of stroke are identical between humans and other mammals, but the rest are different.
  - Evaluation of efficacy: In animals, treatment effects are mostly measured as a reduction of lesion volume, whereas in human studies functional evaluation (which reflects the severity of disabilities) is commonly used. Thus, therapies might reduce the size of the cerebral lesion (found in animals), but not the functional impairment when tested in patients.

== Ethical considerations ==
Stroke models are carried out on animals, which inevitably suffer during the procedure. These encumbrances include, e.g., social stress during single- or multiple-animal caging (depending on the species), transport, animal handling, food deprivation, pain after surgical procedures, neurological disabilities, etc. Thus, according to the general consensus, these experiments require ethical justification. The following arguments can be produced to give reasons for the conduct of animal experiments in stroke research:

- Stroke is very frequent in humans.
- Stroke is the third leading cause of death in developed countries.
- Stroke in the developed countries is the leading cause of disability.
- No treatments have been found for the majority of stroke patients.
- Currently, there are no in vitro methods that could satisfactorily simulate the complex interplay of vasculature, brain tissue, and blood during stroke and thus could replace the greater part of animal experiments.

During animal experimentation, the following prerequisites have to be fulfilled to maintain the ethical justification ("the three Rs"):

- Reduction: Animal numbers should be kept as few as possible (but as high as necessary—to avoid underpowered studies) to draw scientific conclusions.
- Refinement: Experiments must be best planned and conducted by trained personnel to minimize animal suffering on the one hand and to obtain as much knowledge as possible from the animals used.
- Replacement: Whenever possible, animal experiments should be replaced by other methods (e.g., cell culture, computational simulations, etc.).
