= Primate Freedom Project =

Animal rights organisation in Georgia

Logo of the Primate Freedom Project.

The Primate Freedom Project is a 501(c)(3) not-for-profit grassroots animal rights organization based in Atlanta, Georgia. It is dedicated to ending the use of nonhuman primates in biomedical and harmful behavioral experimentation.

The project is the primary sponsor of the proposed National Primate Research Exhibition Hall (NPRX) at 26 North Charter, directly between the Wisconsin National Primate Research Center and the Harry Harlow Primate Psychology Laboratory, in Madison, Wisconsin.

The project provides information to the public concerning the use of nonhuman primates in biomedical and behavioral research in the United States. It advocates for the monkeys and chimpanzees held in American laboratories, primarily through encouraging supporters to write on behalf of individual animals, and through direct mailings to members of the United States Congress. It also supports affiliated grassroots efforts around the United States.

The organization gathers specific details about specific monkeys and chimpanzees in American laboratories through the use of the Freedom of Information Act and state open records statutes. Some of this information is used to memorialize identifying information about specific animals on tags that supporters can wear.

== See also ==
- Animal testing
- Great ape personhood
- Great Ape Project
- Great Ape research ban
- International primate trade
- List of animal rights groups
- Non-human primate experiments
