= Ulcers in Executive Monkeys =

1958 article by Joseph V. Brady

Ulcers in Executive Monkeys was an influential but debunked study into the effects of stress, published in 1958 in Scientific American by Joseph V. Brady.

== Method of the experiment ==
In an early version of the study, Brady placed monkeys in 'restraining chairs' and conditioned them to press a lever. They were given electric shocks every 20 seconds unless they pressed the lever during the same time period. This study came to an abrupt halt when many of the monkeys died from perforated ulcers.

To test this Brady used a yoked control monkey. He placed an 'Executive Monkey' in the restraining chair, which could press the lever to prevent the electric shock. The yoked monkey had no control over the lever, leaving only the 'Executive' with the psychological stress of pushing the lever.

== Reported results ==
After 23 days of a continuous 6 hours on, 6 hours off schedule of electric shocks, the executive monkey died. Brady then tried various schedules, but no monkeys died from this. He then returned to the original 6 on, 6 off, and tested the stomachs of the Executives and found that their stomach acidity was greatest during the rest period.

== Refutation ==
- The Myth of Executive Stress A later Scientific American article points to a large body of research on both humans and primates showing that subordinates suffer more stress than those with power. The article also points to design errors in the original experiment

The final blow to the theory was the discovery that ulcers were primarily the result of disease rather than stress.

== See also ==
- Animal testing on non-human primates
- Peptic ulcer disease
