= E. Sander Connolly =

American neurosurgeon

Edward Sander Connolly Jr. (born 1965) is an American neurosurgeon.

Connolly is a native of New Orleans, Louisiana, and one of six children born to Edward Sander Connolly Sr. and his wife Elise Lapeyre Connolly. Connolly Sr. chaired the neurosurgery department of the Ochsner Medical Center. Connolly Jr. attended Dartmouth College. After graduating from the Louisiana State University Medical School, Connolly Jr. completed his surgical residency at Columbia University Vagelos College of Physicians and Surgeons, specializing in neurosurgery. Connolly formally joined the faculty in 1997, as an assistant professor. In 2008, he was appointed Bennett M. Stein Professor of Neurological Surgery. Connolly became chair of neurological surgery in 2020, and assumed the Byron Stookey Professorship.
