= Animal testing on rodents =

Overview article

Rodents have been employed in biomedical experimentation from the 1650s. Rodent studies up to the early 19th century were mainly physiological or toxicological. The first rodent behavioral study was carried out in 1822, a purely observational study, while quantitative rodent behavioral testing began in the late 19th century.

Currently, rodents are commonly used in animal testing for physiological, pathological and behavioral scientific studies, particularly mice and rats, but also guinea pigs, hamsters, gerbils and others. Mice are the most commonly used vertebrate species, due to their availability, size, low cost, ease of handling, and fast reproduction rate.

== Statistics ==
In the UK in 2015, there were 3.33 million procedures on rodents (80% of total procedures that year). The most common species used were mice (3.03 million procedures, or 73% of the total) and rats (268,522, or 6.5%). Other rodents species included guinea pigs (21,831 / 0.7%), hamsters (1,500 / 0.04%), and gerbils (278 / 0.01%).

In the U.S., the numbers of rats and mice used are not reported, but estimates range from around 11 million to approximately 100 million. In 2000, the Federal Research Division, Library of Congress, published the results of an analysis of its Rats/Mice/and Birds Database: Researchers, Breeders, Transporters, and Exhibitors.

Over 2,000 research organizations are listed in the database, of which approximately 500 were researched and of these, 100 were contacted directly by FRD staff. These organizations include hospitals, government organizations, private companies (pharmaceutical companies, etc.), universities/colleges, a few secondary schools, and research institutes. Of these 2,000, approximately 960 are regulated by USDA; 349 by NIH; and 560 accredited by AALAC. Approximately 50 percent of the organizations contacted revealed a specific or approximated number of animals in their laboratories. The total number of animals for those organizations is: 250,000–1,000,000 rats; 400,000–2,000,000 mice; and 130,000–900,000 birds.

== Rodent types ==
=== Mice ===
Mice are the most commonly used vertebrate species, popular because of their availability, size, low cost, ease of handling, and fast reproduction rate. Mice are quick to reach sexual maturity, as well as quick to gestate, where labs can have a new generation every three weeks as well as a relatively short lifespan of two years.

They are widely considered to be the prime model of inherited human disease and share 99% of their genes with humans. With the advent of genetic engineering technology, genetically modified mice can be generated to order and can cost hundreds of dollars each.

Transgenic animal production consists of injecting each construct into 300–350 eggs, typically representing three days' work. Twenty to fifty mice will normally be born from this number of injected eggs. These animals are screened for the presence of the transgene by a polymerase chain reaction genotyping assay. The number of transgenic animals typically varies from two to eight.

Chimeric mouse production consists of injecting embryonic stem cells provided by the investigator into 150–175 blastocysts, representing three days of work. Thirty to fifty live mice are normally born from this number of injected blastocysts. Normally, the skin color of the mice from which the host blastocysts are derived is different from that of the strain used to produce the embryonic stem cells. Typically two to six mice will have skin and hair with greater than seventy percent ES cell contribution, indicating a good chance for embryonic stem cell contribution to the germline.

=== Syrian hamsters ===
Golden or Syrian hamsters (Mesocricetus auratus) are used to model the human medical conditions including various cancers, metabolic diseases, non-cancer respiratory diseases, cardiovascular diseases, infectious diseases, and general health concerns. In 2006–07, Syrian hamsters accounted for 19% of the total animal research participants in the United States.

=== Rats ===
Rodents such as rats are the most common model in researching effects of cardiovascular disease, as the effects on rodents mimic those in humans. Rats have also been used as tools in research to try to find if there is a difference in the effects of cocaine on adults versus adolescents.

== Limitations ==
While mice, rats and other rodents are by far the most widely used animals in biomedical research, recent studies have highlighted their limitations. For example, the utility of the use of rodents in testing for sepsis, burns, inflammation, stroke, ALS, Alzheimer's, diabetes, cancer, multiple sclerosis, Parkinson's disease and other illnesses has been called into question by a number of researchers. Regarding experiments on mice in particular, some researchers have complained that "years and billions of dollars have been wasted following false leads" as a result of a preoccupation with the use of these animals in studies.

Mice differ from humans in several immune properties: mice are more resistant to some toxins than humans; have a lower total neutrophil fraction in the blood, a lower neutrophil enzymatic capacity, lower activity of the complement system, and a different set of pentraxins involved in the inflammatory process; and lack genes for important components of the immune system, such as IL-8, IL-37, TLR10, ICAM-3, etc. Laboratory mice reared in specific-pathogen-free (SPF) conditions usually have a rather immature immune system with a deficit of memory T cells. These mice may have limited diversity of the microbiota, which directly affects the immune system and the development of pathological conditions. Moreover, persistent virus infections (for example, herpesviruses) are activated in humans, but not in SPF mice, with septic complications and may change the resistance to bacterial coinfections. "Dirty" mice are possibly better suitable for mimicking human pathologies. In addition, inbred mouse strains are used in the overwhelming majority of studies, while the human population is heterogeneous, pointing to the importance of studies in interstrain hybrid, outbred, and nonlinear mice.

An article in The Scientist notes, "The difficulties associated with using animal models for human disease result from the metabolic, anatomic, and cellular differences between humans and other creatures, but the problems go even deeper than that" including issues with the design and execution of the tests themselves.

For example, researchers have found that many rats and mice in laboratories are obese from excess food and minimal exercise which alters their physiology and drug metabolism. Many laboratory animals, including mice and rats, are chronically stressed which can also negatively affect research outcomes and the ability to accurately extrapolate findings to humans. Researchers have also noted that many studies involving mice, rats and other rodents are poorly designed, leading to questionable findings. One explanation for deficiencies in studies of rodents housed in laboratory cages is that they lack access to environmental agency and thus the ongoing freedom to make decisions and experience their consequences. By housing rodents under extreme impoverished conditions, these captive animals bear diminished resemblance to humans or their wild conspecifics.

Some studies suggests that inadequate published data in animal testing may result in irreproducible research, with missing details about how experiments are done are omitted from published papers or differences in testing that may introduce bias. Examples of hidden bias include a 2014 study from McGill University in Montreal, Canada, which suggests that mice handled by men rather than women showed higher stress levels. Another study in 2016 suggested that gut microbiomes in mice may have an impact upon scientific research.

== See also ==
- Animal model
- BALB/c
- C57BL/6
- Fee, Fi, Fo, Fum, and Phooey, five mice who orbited the Moon in 1972
- Mouse models of breast cancer metastasis
- Mouse models of colorectal and intestinal cancer
- Preclinical imaging
- Rat Park
- Testing cosmetics on animals
