= Animal model of autism =

Approach to study autism using non-human species

An animal model of autism is a research approach that uses non-human species to investigate specific biological and behavioral features associated with human autism spectrum disorder (ASD).

Rodent models involving rats or mice are often used since these animals' brains are similar to humans' in makeup and because they have similar social interactions and structures. Behaviors measured in these models can include approach to olfactory pheromones emitted by other mice, approach to familiar and new conspecifics, reciprocal social interactions, ultrasonic vocalizations, communal nesting, sexual and parenting behaviors, territorial scent marking, and aggressive behaviors, as well as motor behaviors such as gait. Other studies have used the zebra finch as a model for autism spectrum disorders when it was observed that the neurobiology of vocalization is similar in humans and songbirds, and that social learning plays a central role in the development of the ability to vocalize.

Given the complexity of autism and its etiology, researchers often focus only on single features of autism when using animal models. For example, researchers may examine the mechanism by which the disorder develops; environmental factors that can correlate to predispositions for ASD; or chromosomal factors.

== Rodent models ==
Rodent models for autism include those using Norway rats (Rattus norvegicus), mu opioid receptor knockout mice, and Fmr1 knockout mice, which are also used as animal models for Fragile X syndrome. More recent research has used the house mouse (Mus musculus) to model autism because it is a social species.

=== Rat models ===
The Norway rat was used in early studies exploring potential links between thiomersal and autism, but the current scientific consensus finds no compelling evidence supporting a causal relationship between thiomersal and autism. Major scientific and medical bodies such as the Institute of Medicine and World Health Organization as well as governmental agencies such as the U.S. Food and Drug Administration and Centers for Disease Control and Prevention reject any role for thiomersal in autism or other neurodevelopmental disorders. However, much research has been done into the use of a rat model to show how Borna virus infection, exposure to valproic acid in utero, or maternal immune activation may cause autism.

=== Mice models ===
Models using mice measure various behaviors, including approach to olfactory pheromones emitted by other mice; approach to familiar and new conspecifics; reciprocal social interactions; ultrasonic vocalizations; communal nesting; sexual and parenting behaviors; territorial scent marking; aggressive behaviors; and motor behaviors such as gait. Social interaction is measured by how the mouse interacts with a stranger mouse introduced in the opposite side of a test box, and it has been observed that mice lacking the gene for oxytocin exhibit deficits in social interaction, suggesting that it may be possible to develop treatments for autism based on abnormalities in this and other neuropeptides. It seems that a mutation in the CNTNAP2 gene – which has been linked to ASD in humans – results in decreased oxytocin levels in mice, and that supplementing affected mice with extra oxytocin has been found to improve these social deficits. However, recent studies have emphasized that the majority of risk factors identified for autism do not directly connect to the oxytocin signaling pathway. This highlights that while oxytocin's role is significant, ASD is complex with a wide array of genetic influences, many of which may affect different biological pathways not directly related to oxytocin.

Researchers from the University of Florida have used deer mice to study restricted and repetitive behavior such as compulsive grooming, and how these behaviors may be caused by specific gene mutations. Research at the University of Texas Southwestern Medical Center used mice to examine the potential role of neuroligin gene mutations in causing autism. Trying to identify the mechanism by which the disorder develops in humans has led to researchers developing an autism severity score to measure the degree of severity of a mouse's autism, as well as the use of scent marking behavior and vocalization distress as models for communication.

== Songbird model ==
In 2012 a researcher from the University of Nebraska at Kearney published a study reviewing research that had been done using the zebra finch as a model for autism spectrum disorders. It was observed that the neurobiology of vocalization is similar in humans and songbirds, and in both species social learning plays a central role in the development of the ability to vocalize. These parallels between humans and songbirds extend to the FOXP2 gene, expressed significantly from embryonic development through adulthood in areas of the central nervous system crucial for motor functions. Other research using this model studied mutations in the FOXP2 gene and its potential role in learned vocalization in both the zebra finch and humans.

Further research has clarified how FOXP2 and its associated gene FOXP1 are distributed in language-related brain centers, and how they influence vocal learning through mechanisms that affect the formation of vocalization-related memories and the neural substrates of song and speech. In zebra finches, knockdown of FOXP2 in the basal ganglia song nucleus Area X impairs singing, further indicating the gene's role in the regulation of song production. Younger birds with knocked down FOXP1 expression have displayed selective learning deficits that impact their ability to form memories essential for the cultural transmission of behavior, such as learning adult model songs.

== Environmental factors ==
Using rodent models, environmental factors such as maternal infection, toxins, and diet have been shown to affect neurodevelopment and gene expression. For example, recent studies make a case for infection during pregnancy being an environmental risk factor in rodents for neurodevelopmental disorders such as ASD or schizophrenia. These environmental factors related to ASD in rodents can then be taken into account when trying to understand the neuropathology of ASD in humans.

Recent advances in research on ASD via rodent models also illustrate the interaction between genetic predispositions and environmental exposures. These exposures can range from prenatal factors such as maternal infections and diet, to postnatal experiences including exposure to toxicants, insecticides, and certain medications. Medications that disrupt sterol biosynthesis (e.g. sertraline) are becoming increasingly recognized for their critical role in the neuropathology of ASD. Detailed analysis has shown how all these factors may heighten susceptibility to developing ASD via their disruption of the neurodevelopmental process. For example, some rodent model studies have observed an increase in immune cells in the prefrontal cortex and an augmentation of support cells in the hippocampus due to toxins, particularly in animals treated with valproic acid. However, a 2013 study by Swiss researchers concluded that 91% of valproic acid/autism studies using animal models – i.e. 31 out of the 34 studies reviewed – had statistical flaws. Specifically, they had failed to correctly use the litter as a level of statistical analysis rather than just the individual mouse or rat.

Maternal immune activation has also been associated with increased risk for development of neurodevelopmental disorders. Maternal immune activation occurs when inflammatory pathways are activated during pregnancy, usually by an infection, with these inflammatory pathways then releasing immune signaling proteins called cytokines. Studies have shown that changes in the expression of cytokines during early stages of life are linked to the likelihood of experiencing neurodevelopmental disorders such as ASD and significant developmental delay.

Related to this, the injection of pregnant rodents with Poly(I:C), an immunostimulant which mimics viral infection, has been shown to induce an inflammatory response and structural changes in the brain of the offspring, bringing about behavioral changes such as hyperactivity, more aggressive behavior, and less social behavior. In addition to viral infection, lipopolysaccharides (LPS) have been used to mimic bacterial infection in rodents in order to observe the effects on the offspring. LPS had similar effects as Poly(I:C) on the immune system of the offspring, increasing inflammation. This inflammatory state in the offspring lasted until adulthood, indicating the long-lasting effects of maternal immune activation.

However, the link between environmental exposures and distinct neurobiological alterations remains unpredictable due to the variability of timing. Since environmental factors can operate at any time during the developmental process there is much variability in the neural and behavioral phenotype of autism. Variability in environmental exposures across rodent studies may contribute to inconsistencies in observed neurodevelopmental outcomes, perhaps illustrated by changes to the rodents' brains that are different to what might have been expected.
