= Early-bird effect =

Ecological effect

The early-bird effect is the advantage a species gains from rapidly using nutrients to establish a large initial population. This initial population advantage can allow a population to persist when nutrients become scarce, even if competitor species are more efficient at extracting scarce nutrients. The effect can be seen when resources vary seasonally, and in laboratory conditions when serial dilutions are taken of microbe cultures.

== Description ==
The early-bird effect arises in ecosystems where there is a time gap between nutrient addition and species removal. During this gap, species can grow and interact in complex ways. Fast-growing species that deplete their preferred resource early can, despite being less efficient per capita than their competitors, still dominate due to their increased numbers. This dynamic suggests extra benefits to growing fast and early, even at the cost of a penalty later. The early-bird effect may be particularly relevant for understanding changes in gut microbiota.

== Key characteristics ==
- Repeated Nutrient Addition and Removal: The effect is prominent in ecosystems with cycles of nutrient addition and species removal.
- Time Gap Dynamics: The critical period between nutrient addition and species removal allows for significant growth and interaction among species.
- Growth and Competitive Advantage: Fast-growing species that consume their preferred resource quickly gain a population advantage. This advantage persists even if these species become less efficient per capita compared to their competitors.
- Dynamic Nature of the Effect: Unlike a founder effect, which is dependent on initial conditions, the Early-Bird Effect is dynamic and continually influenced by the ongoing conditions in the ecosystem.

== Research findings ==
Studies such as those by Erez et al. (2020), Lopez et al. (2023), and others have explored various aspects of this effect, including its impact on community diversity, species dominance, and the dynamics of microbial communities in response to environmental changes.

== Implications ==
The early-bird effect has significant implications for understanding ecosystem dynamics, species diversity, and survival strategies in various environments. It highlights the importance of growth timing and resource utilization efficiency in competitive ecosystems.

In the context of evolution, beneficial mutations that affect late growth could confer a smaller advantage than those that are beneficial earlier in the cycle due to an "early-bird" effect.

== Variations and extensions ==
- Single-Nutrient Early-Bird Effect: A variation observed in single-nutrient competition.
- Influence of Environmental Factors: Factors like nutrient amount and the balance between different nutrients play a crucial role in the manifestation of the Early-Bird Effect.
