= Biomedical Primate Research Centre =

Dutch primate research center

Coordinates: 52.0288°N 4.3404°E

The Biomedical Primate Research Centre (BPRC) is Europe's largest primate animal testing research centre. It is a scientific research institute that performs research that contributes to the identification and development of new medicines against deadly diseases. It is located in Rijswijk (South Holland) and employs about 110 people.

The BPRC is funded by the Dutch Ministry of Education, Culture and Science. Before it became an independent foundation on December 7, 1994, it was part of the Netherlands Organisation for Applied Scientific Research.

The main research areas are Immunobiology, Parasitology, Virology, Ethology and Alternatives for Animal Research. The BPRC houses rhesus macaques and marmosets to be used in biomedical research involving AIDS, malaria, hepatitis, tuberculosis and auto-immune diseases.

In 2002 the Dutch government forbade any further testing on chimpanzees, though it allowed trials already in progress to end. In 2015, BPRC was reported to use about 200 monkeys a year for experiments. Protestors gather regularly in front of the BPRC gates and there are calls in the Dutch parliament to close the centre.

In September 2018, undercover images showed animal abuse at this center leading to questions in the Dutch Parliament.
