= Mouse model of colorectal and intestinal cancer =

Mouse models of colorectal cancer and intestinal cancer are experimental systems in which mice are genetically manipulated, fed a modified diet, or challenged with chemicals to develop malignancies in the gastrointestinal tract. These models enable researchers to study the onset, progression of the disease, and understand in depth the molecular events that contribute to the development and spread of colorectal cancer. They also provide a valuable biological system, to simulate human physiological conditions, suitable for testing therapeutics.

== Colorectal and intestinal cancer ==
=== Familial Adenomatous Polyposis ===
Familial Adenomatous Polyposis (FAP) is a hereditary disease that is characterized with development of numerous colon polyps. A genetic analysis of some FAP kindreds revealed that a common feature of the disease is a deletion of the APC gene. Further analysis of the APC gene revealed the existence of various mutations in cancer sufferers that also play a role in the onset of the sporadic form of colorectal cancer.

==== APC mutant mice ====
The first mouse mutant in the Apc gene came from a colony of randomly mutagenized mice. This mouse model is called Min (multiple intestinal neoplasia) mouse. It was found to carry a truncation mutation at codon 850 of the Apc gene. The Min mouse can develop up to 100 polyps in the small intestine in addition to colon tumors. Later, new knock-out mutants of the Apc gene were engineered. A truncating mutation at codon 716 (Apc^{Δ716}) results in a mouse that develops more than 300 polyps in the small intestine, while truncation at codon 1638 (Apc^{1638N}) results in the formation of about only 3 polyps in the same region of the gastrointestinal tract. More recently a new mutant Apc mouse model was constructed in which multiple polyps form in the distal colon. In this model mutation in the Cdx2 gene in the Apc^{Δ716} mouse model shifted the formation of the polyps from the intestine to the colon, resembling the human FAP. The Apc mutant mice are characterized by early lethality. There are genes modifying the cancer susceptibility of these mouse models. The most well-established is the modifier of Min locus (Mom1). With combination of Min and Mom1 mutations the lifespan of FAP mouse models of colorectal cancer is increased. APC was found to associate with catenins. Today we know that the beta-catenin protein (part of the Wnt signaling pathway) is implicated in colorectal carcinogenesis and its stability in the cell is regulated by APC. A mouse model with deregulation of beta-catenin levels was created. The conditional stabilizing mutation in the beta-catenin gene caused formation of up to 3000 polyps in the small intestine of this mouse model. A mouse model carrying mutations in Apc^{Δ716} and Smad4 (mothers against decapentaplegic homolog 4) is characterized with development of invasive adenocarcinomas.

=== Hereditary nonpolyposis colorectal cancer ===
The most frequent mutations in Hereditary nonpolyposis colorectal cancer (HNPCC) are mutations in the MSH2 and MLH1 genes. These genes play an important role in repairing incorrectly positioned nucleotides. Another gene involved in DNA mismatch repair is Msh6. Both the Msh6 and Msh2 mutant mice develop gastrointestinal cancer but the tumours differ in their microsatellite instability (MI) status. While MSH2 deficiency promotes MI-high tumours, MSH6 deficiency results in MI-low tumours. Another component of the DNA repair machinery in the cell is the protein MLH1. Ablation of MLH1 in mice causes development of gastrointestinal tumours in the small intestine – adenomas and invasive carcinomas. The combination of MLH1 deficiency with the Apc1638N mutant mouse results in strong reduction of viability and increased tumour burden. The tumours were classified as adenomas, invasive adenocarcinomas and late stage carcinomas. Similarly, mice deficient for Msh2 combined with Apc ^{Min} demonstrate accelerated rate of tumorigenesis. Another similar mouse model of HNPCC is the combination of PMS2 mutant mouse with the Min Apc allele resulting in increased number of tumours in the gastrointestinal tract compared to Min. Yet these adenocarcinomas do not metastasize and their histopathology is similar to that of the right side colon cancer in human with frequent mutation of the type II receptor for TGF-β.

=== Mutations in other genes ===
Mice with mutations in transforming growth factor-β1 gene introduced into 129/Sv Rag2 mutant mouse accelerates adenocarcinomas with strong local invasion suggesting a role for genetic background in tumor development. Colon-specific expression of activated mutant of K-ras (protein) (K-ras^{G12D}) results in development of single or multiple lesions. Oncogenic K-ras^{G12D} allele activated in colon epithelium induces expression of procarcinogenic protein kinase C-βII (PKCβII) and increases cell proliferation of epithelial cells, while in the distal colon the mutant form of K-ras has the opposite effects on PKCβII expression and cell proliferation. Treatment of this mouse model with the procarcinogen azoxymethane (AOM) leads to formation of dysplastic microadenomas in the proximal but not in the distal colon. Thus the K-ras^{G12D} mutant is a valuable mouse model of proximal colon carcinogenesis. Mutation in the Muc2 gene causes adenomas and adenocarcinomas in the intestine of mice.

=== Inflammation related colon cancer ===
Human inflammatory bowel disease is a group of inflammatory conditions in the large and small intestine. It is well known that chronic inflammation in the colon can lead to cancer. There are genetic mouse models for inflammatory bowel disease associated colon cancer. Interleukin 10 knock out mice develop invasive adenocarcinoma in the colon. Mutant mice for interleukin 2 and beta microglobulin genes also produce ulcerative colitis-like phenotype and develop adenocarcinomas in the colon. A mouse mutant for N-cadherin suffers inflammatory bowel disease conditions and adenomas but does not develop carcinomas.

== Diet-related model ==
Humans with high levels of the diet-related bile acid deoxycholate (DOC) in their colons are at a substantially increased risk of developing colon cancer (see Bile acids and colon cancer). A diet-related mouse model of colon cancer was devised. In this model, wild type mice are fed a standard diet plus DOC to give a level of DOC in mouse colon comparable to that in the colons of humans on a high fat diet. After 8–10 months, 45% to 56% of the mice developed colonic adenocarcinomas, and no mice had cancers of the small intestine.

On the basis of histopathology and by expression of specific markers, the colonic tumors in the mice were virtually identical to those in humans. In humans, characteristic aberrant changes in molecular markers are detected both in field defects surrounding cancers (from which the cancers arise) and within cancers. In the colonic tissues of mice fed diet plus DOC similar changes in biomarkers occurred. Thus, 8-OH-dG was increased, DNA repair protein ERCC1 was decreased, autophagy protein beclin-1 was increased and, in the stem cell region at the base of crypts, there was substantial nuclear localization of beta-catenin as well as increased cytoplasmic beta-catenin. However, in mice fed diet plus DOC plus the antioxidant chlorogenic acid, the frequency of colon cancer was reduced. Furthermore, when evaluated for ERCC1, beclin-1, and beta-catenin in the stem cell region of crypts, the colonic tissues of chlorogenic acid-fed mice showed amelioration of the molecular aberrancies, suggesting that chlorogenic acid is protective at the molecular level against colon cancer. This is the first diet-related model of colon cancer that closely parallels human progression to colon cancer, both at the histopathology level as well as in its molecular profile.

== Chemically-induced colorectal cancer ==
Azoxymethane (AOM) is a genotoxic colonic carcinogen and is routinely used to induce colon tumours in mice. The AOM-induced tumours form in the last three centimeters of the distal colon but a p21 knock out mouse treated with AOM shows tumour distribution throughout the colon. AOM-induced tumours are characterized with mutations in the Apc gene.

A novel inflammation-related mouse model of colorectal carcinogenesis combines AOM and dextran sodium sulphate (DSS) to induce colon lesions, positive for beta-catenin, COX-2 and inducible nitric oxide synthase.

== See also ==
- Mouse models of breast cancer metastasis
